= Nakagawa =

Nakagawa (中川 lit. "central river") may refer to:

== Places ==
- Nakagawa District (disambiguation)
  - Nakagawa (Teshio) District in Kamikawa, Hokkaidō
  - Nakagawa (Tokachi) District in Tokachi, Hokkaidō
- Nakagawa, Fukuoka is a city in Fukuoka Prefecture, Japan
- Nakagawa, Hokkaidō is a town in Kamikawa Subprefecture in Hokkaido Prefecture, Japan
- Nakagawa, Nagano is a village in Nagano Prefecture, Japan
- Nakagawa, Tochigi is a town in Tochigi Prefecture, Japan
- Nakagawa, Tokushima is a former town Tokushima Prefecture

== Other uses ==
- Nakagawa (surname)

== See also ==
- Naka River (disambiguation)
