= Teshio =

Teshio (天塩) may refer to:

- Teshio District, Hokkaidō, a district in Hokkaidō
- Teshio, Hokkaidō, a town
- Teshio Province, an old province
- Teshio Mountains, a mountain range
- Teshio River
