= Nakagawa District =

Nakagawa District (Japanese: 中川郡) may refer to:

- Nakagawa (Tokachi) District, Hokkaido
- Nakagawa (Teshio) District, Hokkaido
- Nakagawa, Nanyo in Yamagata Prefecture

== See also ==
- Nakagawa (disambiguation)
