= Kamikawa (Teshio) District, Hokkaido =

District in the country of Japan

Coordinates: 43°43′12″N 142°50′24″E

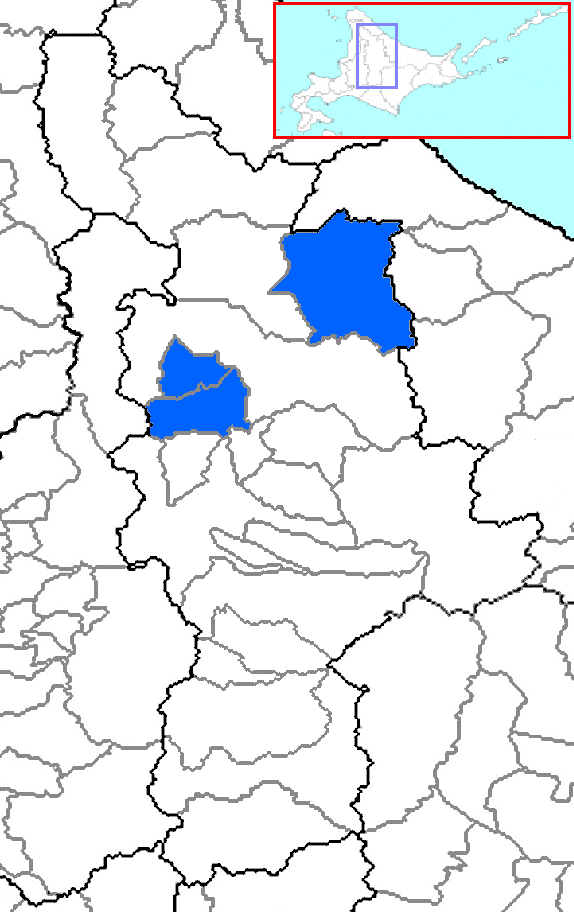
The area of Kamikawa (Teshio) District in Kamikawa Subprefecture.

Kamikawa (上川郡 (天塩国), Kamikawa-gun (Teshio no kuni)) is a district located in Kamikawa Subprefecture, Hokkaido, Japan. Confusingly, there is a district of the same name, Kamikawa (Ishikari) District, in the same subprefecture. In 1869, when Hokkaido was divided into 11 provinces and 86 districts, this Kamikawa District was placed under Teshio Province. The name is derived from its location at the headwaters of the Teshio River, whereas the other Kamikawa District is named after the headwaters of the Ishikari River. There is a third district with this name in Hokkaido, see Kamikawa (Tokachi) District.

As of 2004, the district has an estimated population of 19,531 and a density of 11.21 persons per km^{2}. The total area is 1,742.85 km^{2}.

== Towns and villages ==
- Kenbuchi
- Shimokawa
- Wassamu

== Mergers ==
- On September 1, 2005, the town of Asahi was merged into the city of Shibetsu.
- On March 27, 2006, the town of Fūren was merged into the city of Nayoro.
