= Higashikawa =

Higashikawa 東川町
- Town
- Flag Emblem

- Location of Higashikawa in Hokkaido (Kamikawa Subprefecture)

- Location in Japan
- Coordinates: 43°42′N 142°31′E
- Country: Japan
- Region: Hokkaido
- Prefecture: Hokkaido (Kamikawa Subprefecture)
- District: Kamikawa (Ishikari)

Area
  - Total: 247.06 km^{2} (95.39 sq mi)

Population (September 30, 2016)
  - Total: 8,092
  - Density: 32.75/km^{2} (84.83/sq mi)
- Time zone: UTC+09:00 (JST)
- City hall address: 071-1492
- Climate: Dfb
- Website: www.town.higashikawa.hokkaido.jp

Higashikawa (東川町, Higashikawa-chō) is a town located in Kamikawa Subprefecture, Hokkaido, Japan.

As of September 2016, the town has an estimated population of 8,092, and a density of 33 persons per km^{2}. The total area is 247.06 km^{2}.

Higashikawa declared itself a photo town (写真の町, shashin no machi) in the 1980s and has done much to sponsor photography since, notably the annually awarded Higashikawa Prizes. In recent years, the number of cafes, general stores, wineries, vineyards, sake breweries, etc. has increased due to population growth resulting from increased immigration from all over the country. More young people are visiting as tourists. In terms of population growth in 2021, it ranked first in Hokkaido.

== Climate ==
Climate data for Higashikawa, elevation 215 m (705 ft), (1991−2020 normals, extremes 1977−present)
Month	Jan	Feb	Mar	Apr	May	Jun	Jul	Aug	Sep	Oct	Nov	Dec	Year
Record high °C (°F)	6.9 (44.4)	13.0 (55.4)	16.0 (60.8)	28.1 (82.6)	34.9 (94.8)	36.1 (97.0)	36.6 (97.9)	37.0 (98.6)	33.2 (91.8)	25.4 (77.7)	20.7 (69.3)	12.5 (54.5)	37.0 (98.6)
Mean daily maximum °C (°F)	−4.0 (24.8)	−2.7 (27.1)	2.1 (35.8)	10.3 (50.5)	18.1 (64.6)	22.4 (72.3)	25.9 (78.6)	26.0 (78.8)	21.5 (70.7)	14.2 (57.6)	5.8 (42.4)	−1.5 (29.3)	11.5 (52.7)
Daily mean °C (°F)	−8.1 (17.4)	−7.3 (18.9)	−2.5 (27.5)	4.8 (40.6)	11.8 (53.2)	16.5 (61.7)	20.3 (68.5)	20.5 (68.9)	15.7 (60.3)	8.8 (47.8)	2.0 (35.6)	−4.9 (23.2)	6.5 (43.6)
Mean daily minimum °C (°F)	−13.3 (8.1)	−12.8 (9.0)	−7.6 (18.3)	−0.6 (30.9)	5.9 (42.6)	11.4 (52.5)	15.8 (60.4)	16.1 (61.0)	10.8 (51.4)	4.0 (39.2)	−1.9 (28.6)	−9.2 (15.4)	1.5 (34.8)
Record low °C (°F)	−29.1 (−20.4)	−29.3 (−20.7)	−24.8 (−12.6)	−11.9 (10.6)	−3.6 (25.5)	0.1 (32.2)	6.0 (42.8)	6.3 (43.3)	0.0 (32.0)	−4.6 (23.7)	−18.0 (−0.4)	−25.5 (−13.9)	−29.3 (−20.7)
Average precipitation mm (inches)	37.8 (1.49)	33.2 (1.31)	39.1 (1.54)	44.7 (1.76)	69.5 (2.74)	78.0 (3.07)	139.0 (5.47)	157.9 (6.22)	132.1 (5.20)	95.5 (3.76)	90.3 (3.56)	66.1 (2.60)	983.2 (38.71)
Average precipitation days (≥ 1.0 mm)	16.2	12.4	12.9	11.1	11.1	10.6	12.6	12.3	13.5	15.3	18.1	19.2	165.3
Mean monthly sunshine hours	63.3	83.8	122.9	150.0	187.0	167.7	159.0	152.4	142.4	116.9	59.8	45.0	1,450.1
Source: JMA
