= Otoineppu =

Otoineppu 音威子府村
- Village
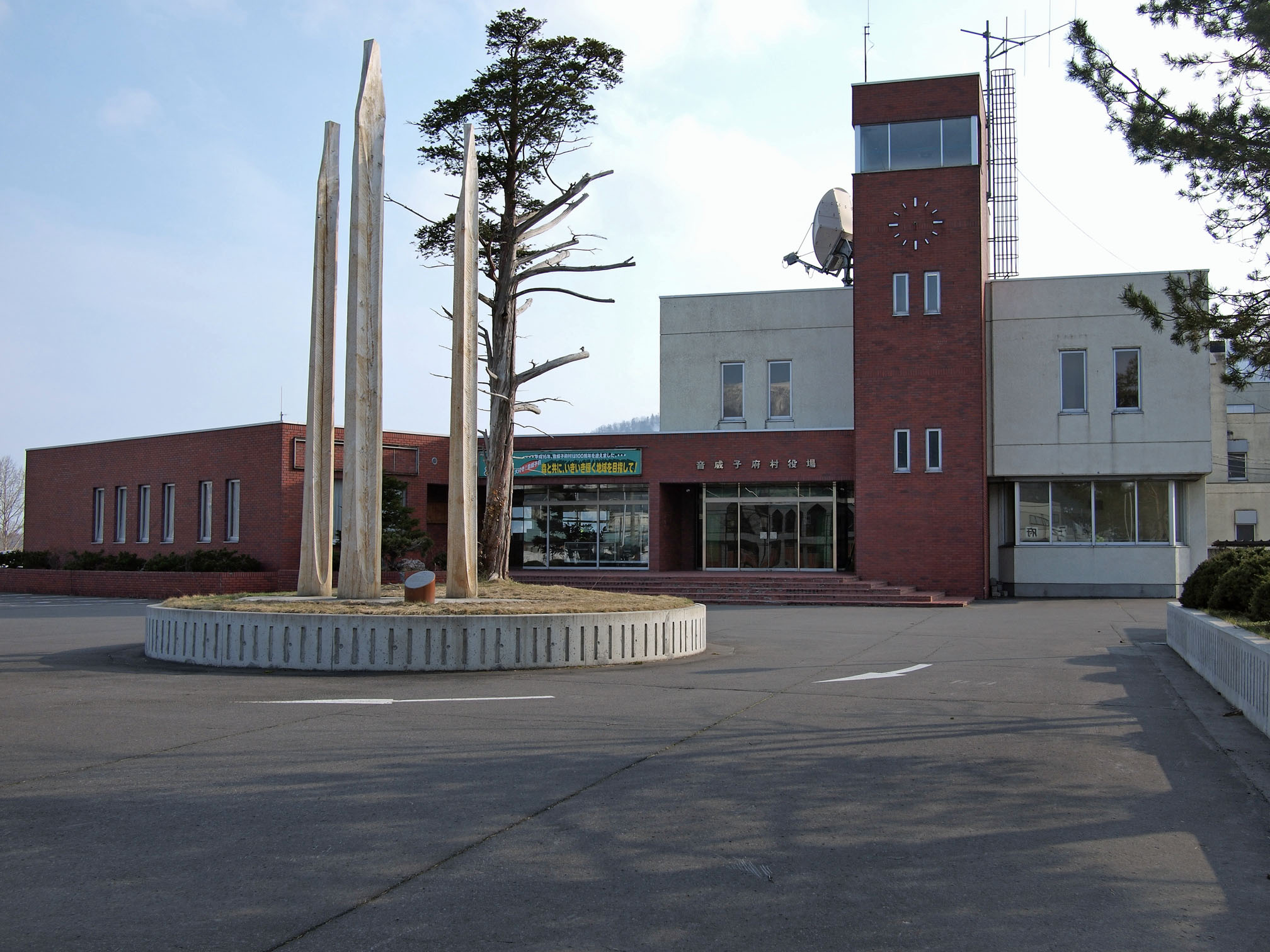
- Otoineppu Village Hall

- Flag Seal

- Location in Japan
- Coordinates: 44°43′32″N 142°15′44″E
- Country: Japan
- Region: Hokkaido
- Prefecture: Hokkaido
- Subprefecture: Kamikawa Subprefecture
- District: Nakagawa (Teshio)
- Incorporated: 1909

Government
  - Mayor: Takayuki Endo

Area
  - Total: 275.63 km^{2} (106.42 sq mi)
- Elevation: 40 m (130 ft)

Population (January 31, 2025)
  - Total: 584
  - Density: 2.12/km^{2} (5.49/sq mi)
- Time zone: UTC+9 (Japan Standard Time)
- Phone number: 01656-5-3311
- Address: 444-1 Otoineppu Otoineppu-mura, Nakagawa-gun, Hokkaido 904-2501
- Climate: Dfb
- Website: Official website (in Japanese)
- Symbols
- Bird: Dollarbird
- Flower: Moss phlox
- Mascot: Otokki (おとっきー)
- Tree: Picea glehnii

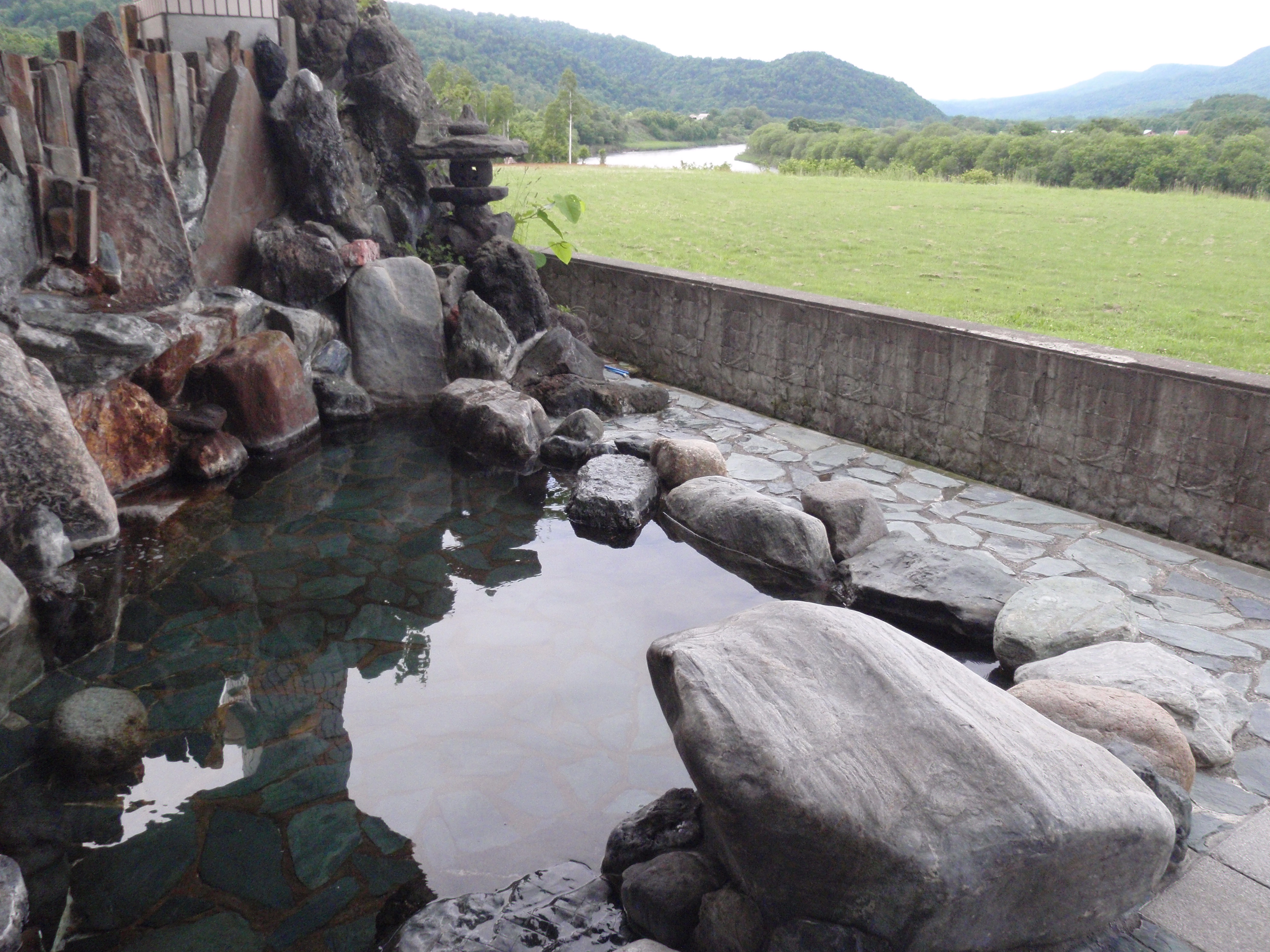
Teshiogawa onsen

Otoineppu (音威子府村, Otoineppu-mura) is a village located in Kamikawa Subprefecture, Hokkaido, Japan. As of 31 January 2025, the village had an estimated population of 584 in 402 households, and a population density of 2.1 people per km^{2}. The total area of the village is 275.63 km^{2} (106.42 sq mi). Otoineppu designates itself as the "smallest village in Hokkaido".

== Etymology ==
In the Ainu language, Otoineppu means "muddy river mouth". The name is probably a reference to muddy appearance of the water at the confluence of the Teshio River and one of its many tributaries, the Otoineppu River.

== Geography ==
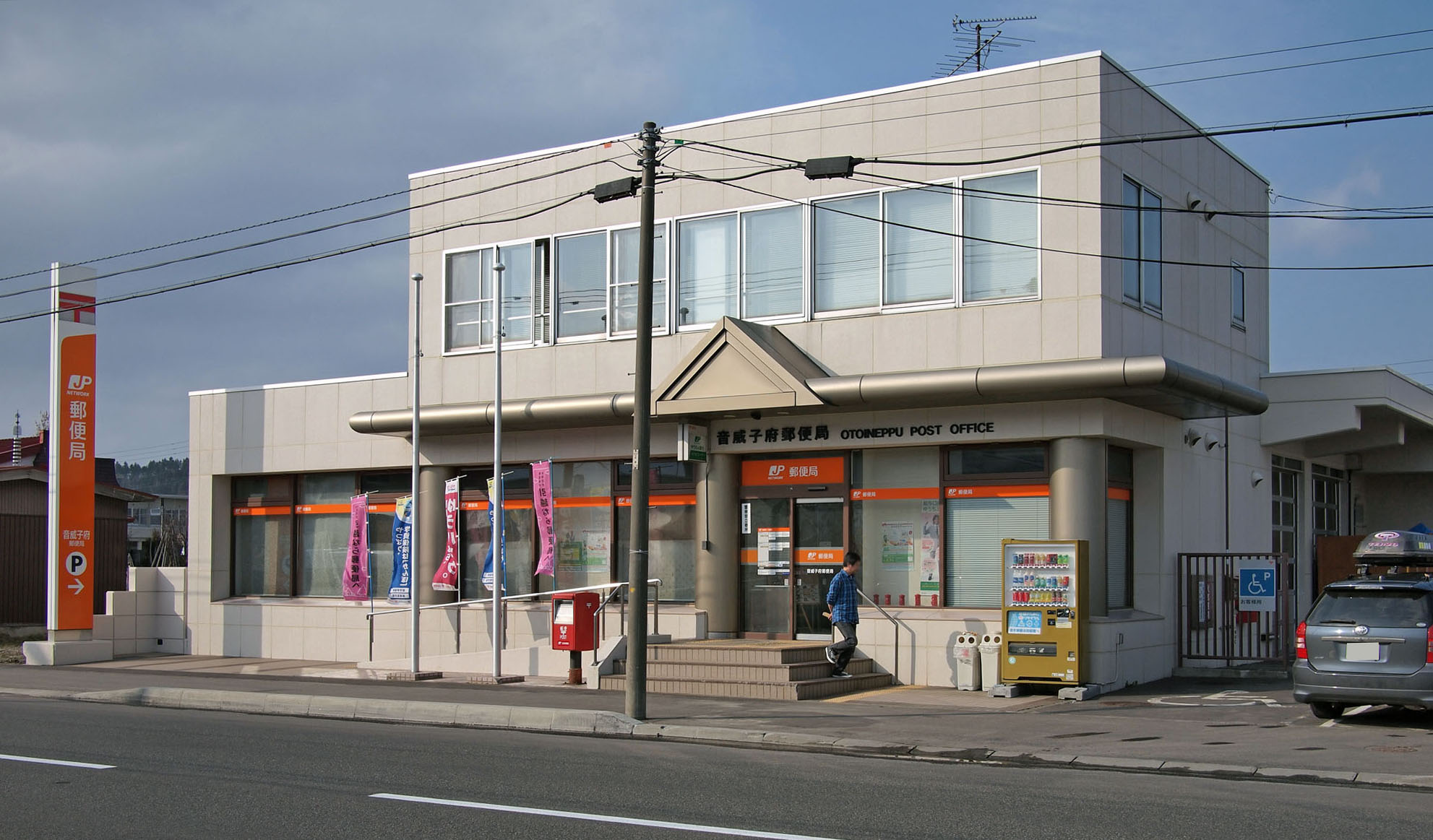
Otoineppu Post Office

Otoineppu is a landlocked village at the north of Hokkaido. The village sits at the northern tip of the Nayoro Basin, and is flanked by the Kitami Mountains to the east and the Teshio Mountains to the west. The village measures 22.2 kilometres (13.8 mi) from east to west and 18.6 kilometres (11.6 mi) from north to south, and sits at an elevation of 40 metres (130 ft). 80% of the village is covered by forest.

The Teshio River (256 kilometres (159 mi)), the fourth longest river in Japan, flows north through Otoineppu before turning sharply west near the village center. The JR Hokkaido Sōya Main Line and Japan National Route 40 run along the Teshio River through Otoineppu.

=== Neighboring municipalities ===
Otoineppu borders four towns in Hokkaido:

- Bifuka
- Esashi (Sōya)
- Nakagawa
- Nakatonbetsu

== Climate ==
Otoineppu has a humid continental climate (Köppen: Dfb). Otoineppu, which sits only 50 kilometres (31 mi) from both the Sea of Okhotsk and Japan Sea, is located within a maritime climate. The village is ringed in by mountains from all four directions, and sees significant temperature extremes. The average temperatures from December to March are below −6 °C (21 °F), with days as low as −30 °C (−22 °F); temperatures from June to September are typically above 17 °C (63 °F), with some days reaching above 30 °C (86 °F).

Otoineppu is noted for its deep snowfalls; some areas of the village have snowfalls as high as 12 metres (39 ft). In 1998 the village had Hokkaido's second-deepest snowfall on record.

Climate data for Otoineppu, elevation 40 m (130 ft), (1991−2020 normals, extremes 1977−present)
Month	Jan	Feb	Mar	Apr	May	Jun	Jul	Aug	Sep	Oct	Nov	Dec	Year
Record high °C (°F)	6.5 (43.7)	8.6 (47.5)	13.9 (57.0)	25.3 (77.5)	31.5 (88.7)	33.6 (92.5)	36.6 (97.9)	35.5 (95.9)	31.4 (88.5)	25.7 (78.3)	19.2 (66.6)	10.0 (50.0)	36.6 (97.9)
Mean daily maximum °C (°F)	−3.9 (25.0)	−2.7 (27.1)	1.8 (35.2)	8.5 (47.3)	16.4 (61.5)	20.7 (69.3)	24.2 (75.6)	24.8 (76.6)	21.1 (70.0)	14.1 (57.4)	5.3 (41.5)	−1.5 (29.3)	10.7 (51.3)
Daily mean °C (°F)	−8.0 (17.6)	−7.7 (18.1)	−2.7 (27.1)	3.6 (38.5)	10.1 (50.2)	14.5 (58.1)	18.5 (65.3)	19.5 (67.1)	15.3 (59.5)	8.7 (47.7)	1.7 (35.1)	−4.8 (23.4)	5.7 (42.3)
Mean daily minimum °C (°F)	−13.9 (7.0)	−14.5 (5.9)	−8.4 (16.9)	−1.3 (29.7)	4.3 (39.7)	9.2 (48.6)	14.0 (57.2)	15.2 (59.4)	10.5 (50.9)	4.1 (39.4)	−1.7 (28.9)	−8.8 (16.2)	0.7 (33.3)
Record low °C (°F)	−34.8 (−30.6)	−34.9 (−30.8)	−30.1 (−22.2)	−15.0 (5.0)	−4.6 (23.7)	−0.8 (30.6)	4.6 (40.3)	4.8 (40.6)	1.0 (33.8)	−6.7 (19.9)	−19.2 (−2.6)	−27.4 (−17.3)	−34.9 (−30.8)
Average precipitation mm (inches)	106.7 (4.20)	70.7 (2.78)	71.4 (2.81)	56.8 (2.24)	65.5 (2.58)	60.6 (2.39)	120.4 (4.74)	163.9 (6.45)	148.0 (5.83)	164.3 (6.47)	180.3 (7.10)	158.0 (6.22)	1,366.6 (53.81)
Average snowfall cm (inches)	291 (115)	218 (86)	179 (70)	72 (28)	3 (1.2)	0 (0)	0 (0)	0 (0)	0 (0)	3 (1.2)	124 (49)	325 (128)	1,215 (478.4)
Average extreme snow depth cm (inches)	166 (65)	186 (73)	186 (73)	130 (51)	11 (4.3)	0 (0)	0 (0)	0 (0)	0 (0)	2 (0.8)	42 (17)	122 (48)	186 (73)
Average precipitation days (≥ 1.0 mm)	21.1	17.3	16.1	12.1	10.7	8.8	10.2	11.4	13.8	17.5	21.6	25.0	185.6
Average snowy days (≥ 3.0 cm)	24.1	20.8	19.1	10.3	0.5	0	0	0	0	0.3	10.5	24.3	109.9
Mean monthly sunshine hours	41.0	61.7	97.1	144.0	175.1	160.0	139.8	130.8	137.2	108.5	40.3	23.4	1,258.9
Source 1: JMA
Source 2: JMA

=== Demographics ===
Per Japanese census data, the population of Otoineppu is as shown below. The village is in a long period of sustained population loss.

Historical population
Year	Pop.	±%
1940	3,642	—
1950	4,185	+14.9%
1960	3,886	−7.1%
1970	2,839	−26.9%
1980	2,100	−26.0%
1990	1,584	−24.6%
2000	1,334	−15.8%
2010	995	−25.4%
2020	706	−29.0%

== History ==
The name "Otoineppu" first appeared in the 1797 "Matsumae Chi Nami Nishi Ezo Chi Meiseiki", where it was written as "Otoekofu".

In 1857, Matsuura Takeshiro visited the Teshio River basin and stayed with an Ainu elder near the current Osashima neighborhood.

The construction of a road north of Asahikawa, which began in 1896, finally reached the current Otoineppu village area in 1904. At this time, post office manager Nagamura Hide (a Hokkaido government official from Ishikawa Prefecture) moved to the area, and this marked the founding of Otoineppu village. The following year, 32 tenant farming families settled in the area. By the start of the Taisho period, about 200 families had settled in various parts of the village. In 1916, the village of Tokiwa (常盤村, Tokiwa-mura) was established. The area developed as a hub for railway construction and water transport. It was renamed Otoineppu in 1963. The name of the village was changed due to the fact that center of the village is in the Otoineppu district, and Otoineppu Station was widely known as a terminus on the JR Sōya Main Line and the Tenpoku Line. However, the population dropped sharply due to the privatization of the Japan National Railways in the 1980s, the abolition of the Tenpoku Line in 1989, and the reduction in station operations.

== Government ==
Otoineppu has a mayor-council form of government with a directly elected mayor and a unicameral village council of eight members. Otoineppu, collectively with the other municipalities of Kawakami sub-prefecture, contributes three members to the Hokkaidō Prefectural Assembly. In terms of national politics, the village is part of the Hokkaidō 6th district of the lower house of the Diet of Japan.

In the 2017 Japanese general election, 55.97% of Otoineppu's proportional ballots were cast for one of the three parties in the pacifist opposition coalition (the Constitutional Democratic Party, the Social Democratic Party, and the Japanese Communist Party), making it the most left-leaning municipality in the country in this election under that definition.

== Economy ==
The economy of Otoineppu is based on agriculture and forestry. Buckwheat is the main crop.

== Education ==
The Otoineppu maintains two schools: Otoineppu Elementary School and Otoineppu Junior High School, operated by the village government. The village also maintains a high school, Hokkaido Otoineppu Arts & Craft High School, operated by the Hokkaido Prefectural Board of Education.

== Transportation ==
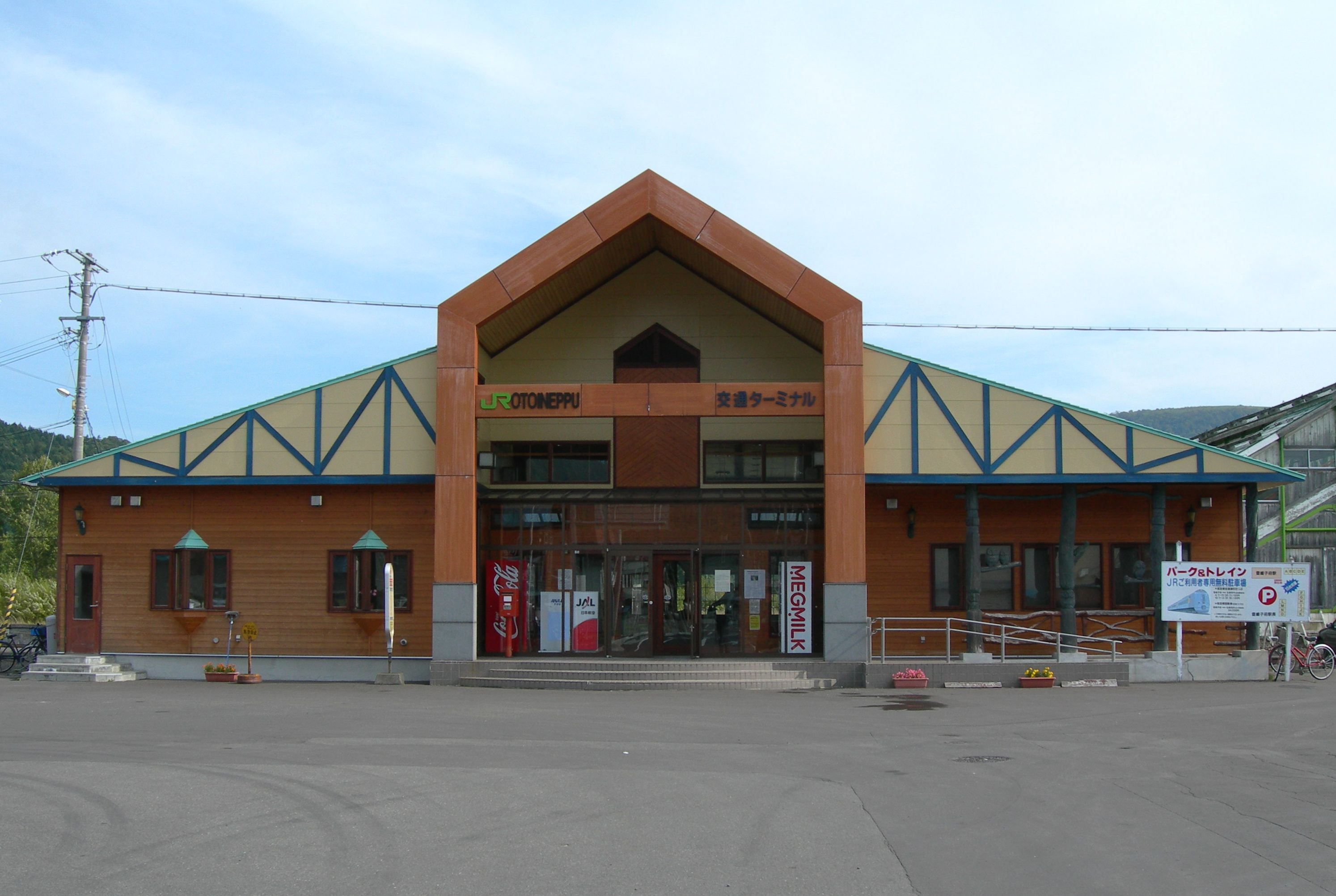
Otoineppu Station

=== Railway ===
JR Hokkaido - Sōya Main Line

■ Teshiogawa-Onsen - Sakkuru - Otoineppu - Osashima

Otoineppu is served by the JR Hokkaido Sōya Main Line. The Sōya Main Line is the northernmost train line in Japan, and runs from Asahikawa Station in Asahikawa in north-central Hokkaido to Wakkanai Station in Wakkanai at the very north of the prefecture.

The defunct JNR Tempoku Line once broke off from the Sōya Main Line at Otoineppu Station and ran north to the coast of the Sea of Okhotsk, and again met the Sōya Main Line at Wakkanai Station. The line was discontinued in 1989 and replaced by bus service.

=== Highways ===
- National Route 40 Japan National Route 40 runs along the Teshio River through Otoineppu, and connects Asahikawa in central Hokkaido to Wakkanai at the northern tip of the prefecture. Japan National Route 275 breaks off from National Route 40 at the village center of Otoineppu and extends on to Hamatonbetsu on the coast of the Sea of Okhotsk.

== Culture ==
=== Mascot ===
Otokki, the village's mascot

Otoineppu's mascot is Otokki (おとっきー). He is a Picea glehnii tree who is a friendly park ranger. He sometimes wears a crown as a park ranger hat. He also attends events, especially school-related functions. His design was unveiled on 4 August 2013.

== Notable people from Otoineppu ==
- Keishin Yoshida, cross-country skier
