= Kenbuchi =

Town in the country of Japan

Kenbuchi 剣淵町
- Town
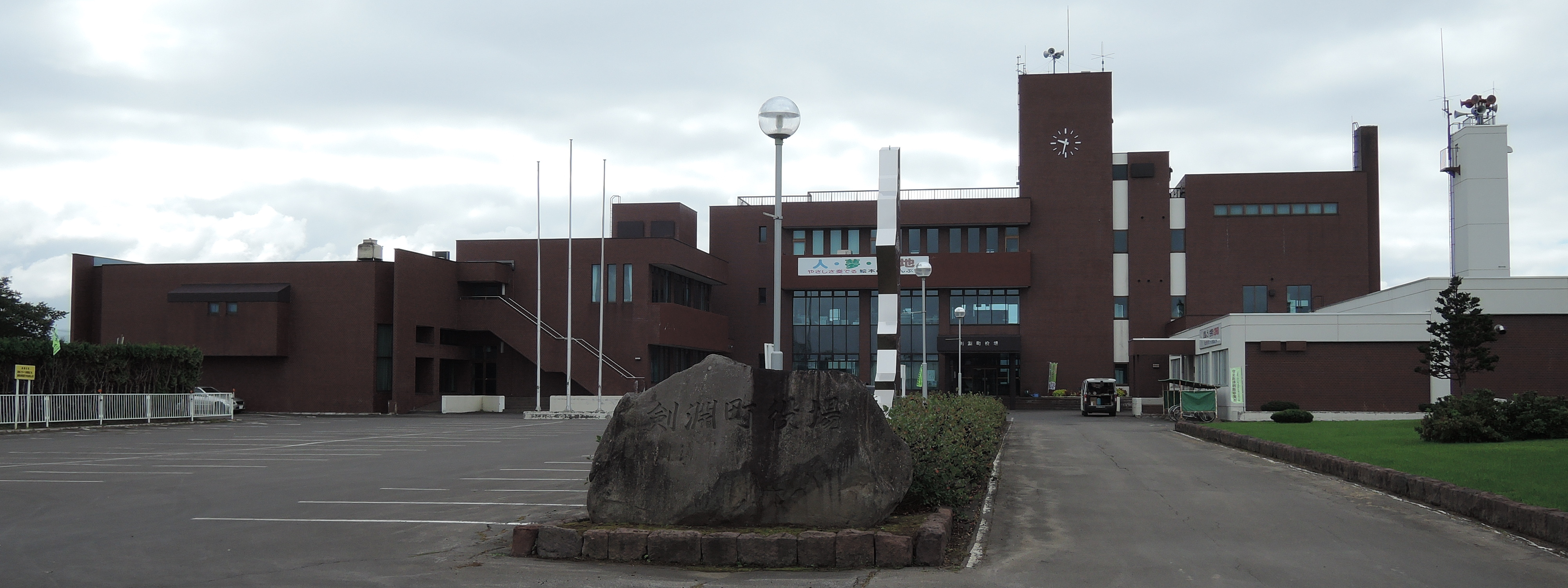
- Kenbuchi town hall

- Flag Emblem

- Location in Japan
- Coordinates: 44°5′45″N 142°21′41″E
- Country: Japan
- Region: Hokkaido
- Prefecture: Hokkaido (Kamikawa Subprefecture)
- District: Kamikawa (Teshio)

Area
  - Total: 130.99 km^{2} (50.58 sq mi)

Population (January 31, 2025)
  - Total: 2,719
  - Density: 20.76/km^{2} (53.76/sq mi)
- Time zone: UTC+09:00 (JST)
- City hall address: 37-1 Nakamachi, Kenbuchi-cho, Kamikawa-gun, Hokkaido 098-0392
- Climate: Dfb
- Website: Official website
- Symbols
- Flower: Gentiana triflora var. japonica (Ezo Gentian)
- Tree: Fraxinus mandschurica

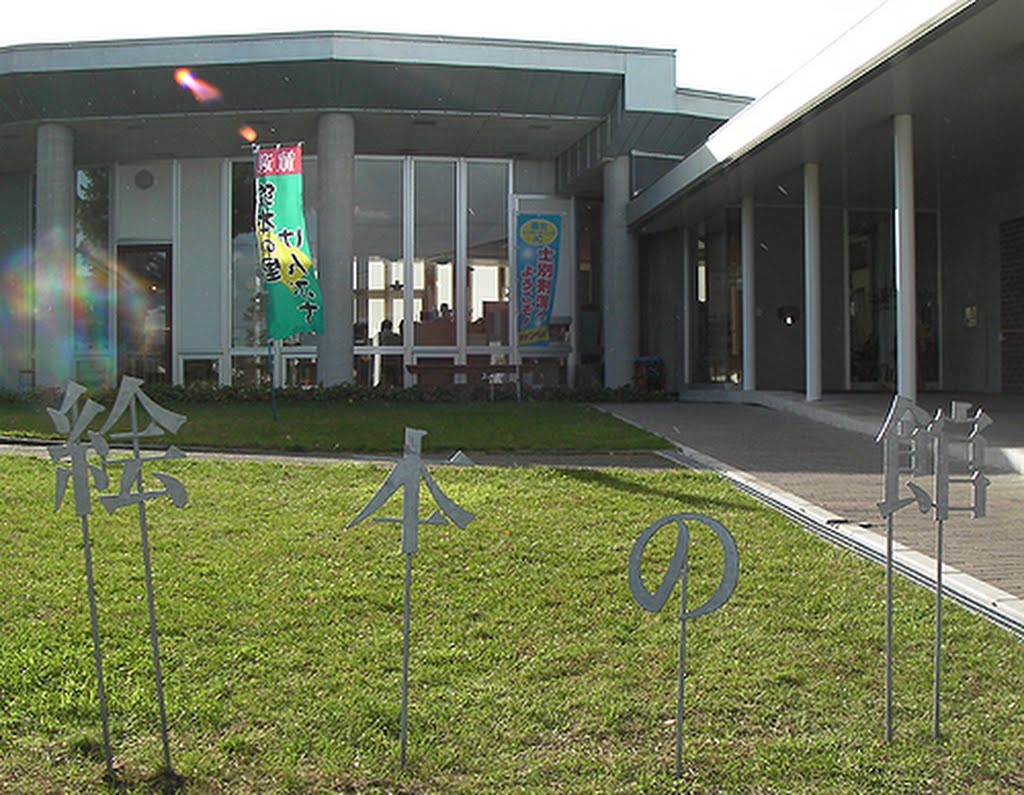
Kenbuchi Picture-Book Museum

Kenbuchi (剣淵町, Kenbuchi-chō) is a town located in Kamikawa Subprefecture, Hokkaido, Japan. As of 31 January 2025, the town had an estimated population of 2,719 in 1391 households, and a population density of 21 people per km^{2}. The total area of the town is 130.99 km^{2} (50.58 sq mi).

== Geography ==
Kenbuchi is located along the Kenbuchi River, a tributary of the Teshio River.

=== Neighbouring municipalities ===
- Hokkaido
  - Shibetsu
  - Wassamu

=== Climate ===
Kenbuchi has a Humid continental climate (Köppen Dfb) characterized by cold summers and cold winters with heavy snowfall. The average annual temperature in Kenbuchi is 5.3 °C. The average annual rainfall is 1451 mm with September as the wettest month. The temperatures are highest on average in August, at around 19.6 °C, and lowest in January, at around -8.9 °C.

=== Demographics ===
Per Japanese census data, the population of Kenbuchi is as shown below. The town is in a long period of sustained population loss.

Historical population
Year	Pop.	±%
1940	9,495	—
1950	9,283	−2.2%
1960	9,047	−2.5%
1970	7,056	−22.0%
1980	5,481	−22.3%
1990	4,703	−14.2%
2000	4,158	−11.6%
2010	3,569	−14.2%
2020	2,926	−18.0%

== History ==
The area of Kenbuchi was inhabited by Ainu people and the name comes from the Ainu word "Kene(petsu)puchi", which means "(alder (river) - mouth) "., which refers to the confluence of the present-day Kenbuchi River and Teshio River. The hamlet of Kenbuchi was established in 1897, and on April 1, 1906, with the implementation of the Hokkaido second-class town and village system, became Kenbuchi Village. It was separated from Wassamu Village on April 1, 1915, and another portion was separated to form Onnebetsu Village on October 1, 1927. Kenbuchi was raised to town status on January 1, 1962.

== Government ==
Kenbuchi has a mayor-council form of government with a directly elected mayor and a unicameral town council of eight members. Kenbuchi, collectively with the other municipalities of Kawakami sub-prefecture, contributes three members to the Hokkaidō Prefectural Assembly. In terms of national politics, the town is part of the Hokkaidō 6th district of the lower house of the Diet of Japan.

== Economy ==
The economy of Kenbuchi is overwhelmingly agricultural, and includes field crops, vegetables, dairy farming, and livestock farming.

== Education ==
Kenbuchi has one public elementary school and one public junior high school operated by the town government, and one public high school operated by the Hokkaido Prefectural Board of Education.

== Transportation ==
=== Railways ===
JR Hokkaido - Sōya Main Line

■ Kenbuchi

=== Highways ===
- Dō-Ō Expressway
- National Route 40
- National Route 239

== Culture ==
=== Mascot ===
Puchi-na, the town's mascot

Kenbuchi's mascot is Puchi-na (ぷっちーな, Putchi-na) or her full name, Ariel Petit Santa Rosa de Lima (アリエル・プチ・サンタ・ロサ・デ・リマ). She is a reticent but friendly and curious llama from Palcamayo, Peru to reside in Viva Alpaca Farm in January 2013 from Kenbuchi's Peruvian community after reading a Christmas card. She became mascot on 17 February 2013. Her hobbies are visiting events and collecting picture books. She is a vegetarian. As a result, she pays homage to the immigrants to Japan. She has a brother named Alpaca Pal (アルパカ・パル, Arupaka Paru). Her birthday is the same day as the Kenbuchi Shrine Festival (12 July). According to Andean legend, her heart contains a mysterious power that causes happiness.
