= Wassamu =

Wassamu 和寒町
- Town
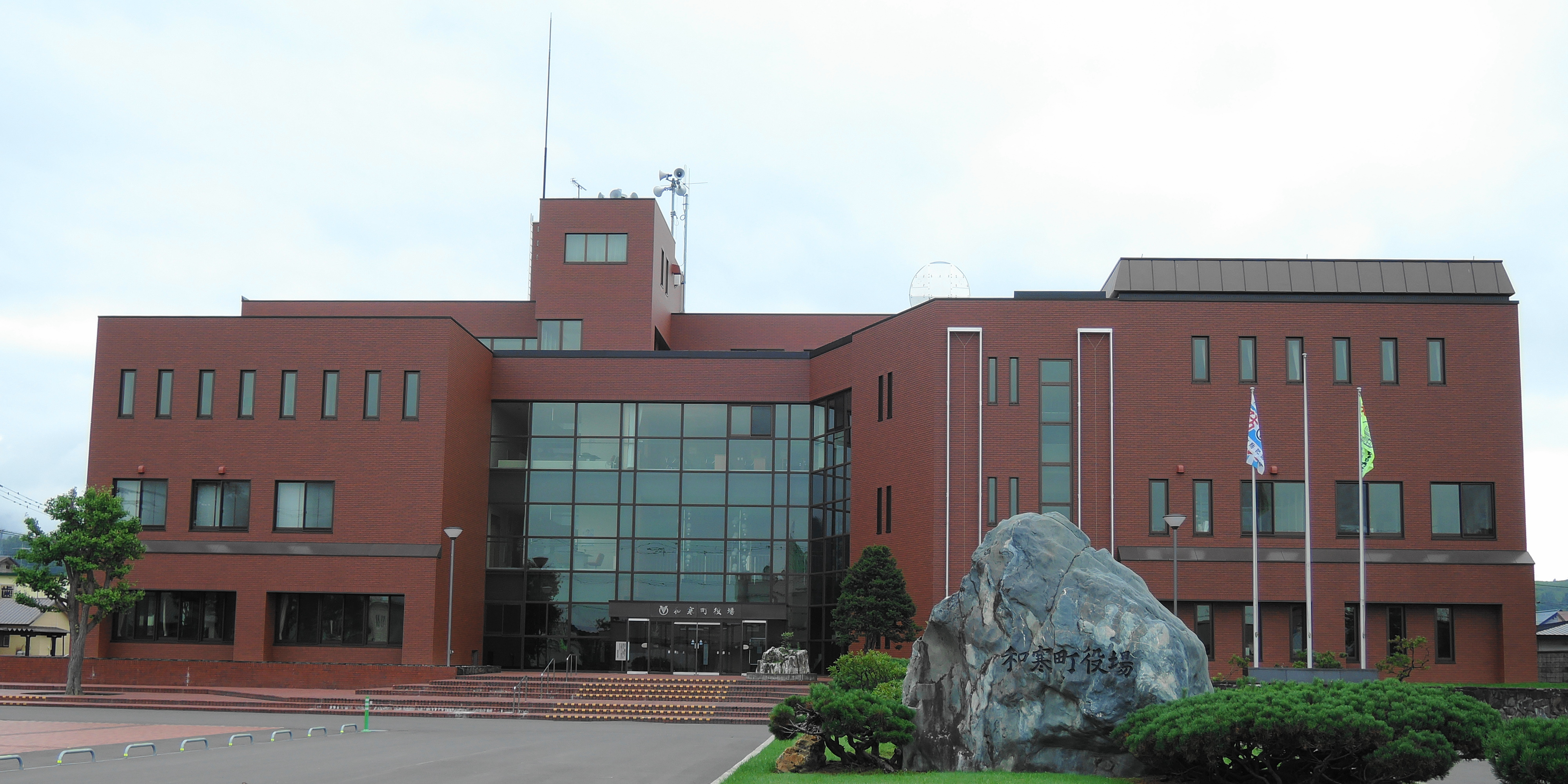
- Wassamu town hall

- Flag Seal
- /0/queryThe property query is required; /0/idsThe property ids is required; /0Failed to match at least one schema; /0/titleThe property title is required; /0/serviceDoes not have a value in the enumeration ["page"]; /0Failed to match exactly one schema; /0/geometriesThe property geometries is required; /0/typeDoes not have a value in the enumeration ["GeometryCollection"]; /0/typeDoes not have a value in the enumeration ["MultiPolygon"]; /0/typeDoes not have a value in the enumeration ["Point"]; /0/typeDoes not have a value in the enumeration ["MultiPoint"]; /0/typeDoes not have a value in the enumeration ["LineString"]; /0/typeDoes not have a value in the enumeration ["MultiLineString"]; /0/typeDoes not have a value in the enumeration ["Polygon"]; /0/coordinatesThe property coordinates is required; /0/geometryThe property geometry is required; /0/typeDoes not have a value in the enumeration ["Feature"]; /0/featuresThe property features is required; /0/typeDoes not have a value in the enumeration ["FeatureCollection"]; Location of Wassamu in Hokkaido (Kamikawa Subprefecture)

- Location in Japan
- Coordinates: 44°1′23″N 142°24′48″E
- Country: Japan
- Region: Hokkaido
- Prefecture: Hokkaido (Kamikawa Subprefecture)
- District: Kamikawa (Teshio)

Area
  - Total: 225.11 km^{2} (86.92 sq mi)

Population (January 31, 2025)
  - Total: 2,804
  - Density: 12.46/km^{2} (32.26/sq mi)
- Time zone: UTC+09:00 (JST)
- City hall address: 120 Nishimachi, Wassamu-cho, Kamikawa-gun, Hokkaido 098-0192
- Climate: Dfb
- Website: Official website
- Symbols
- Flower: Erythronium japonicum
- Tree: Elm

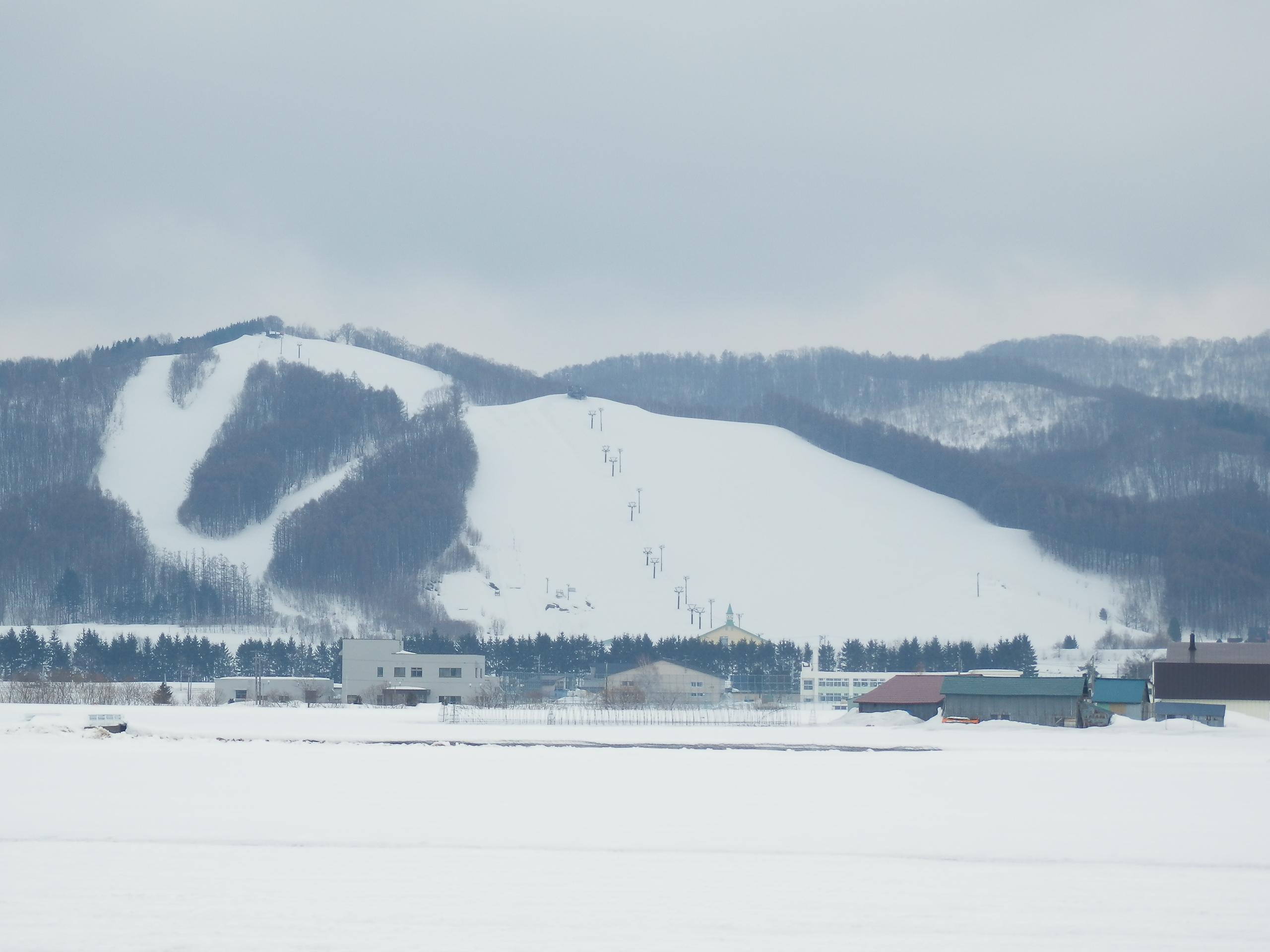
Wassamu Higashiyama Ski Resort

Wassamu (和寒町, Wassamu-chō) is a town located in Kamikawa Subprefecture, Hokkaido, Japan. As of 31 January 2025, the town had an estimated population of 2,804 in 1459 households, and a population density of 12 people per km^{2}. The total area of the town is 225.11 km^{2} (86.92 sq mi). Wassamu is famous for its pumpkin and cabbage crops.

== Geography ==
Wassamu is spreads out at the foot of Shiokari Pass, which is the source of the Matarukushkenebuchi River, a tributary of the Teshio River. It is at the southern end of the Nayoro Basin and has many hilly areas.

=== Neighbouring municipalities ===
- Hokkaido
  - Asahikawa
  - Shibetsu
  - Kenbuchi
  - Takasu
  - Pipppu
  - Horokanai

=== Climate ===
Wassamu has a Humid continental climate (Köppen Dfb) characterized by cold summers and cold winters with heavy snowfall. The average annual temperature in Wassamu is 5.3 °C. The average annual rainfall is 1336 mm with September as the wettest month. The temperatures are highest on average in August, at around 19.6 °C, and lowest in January, at around -9.0 °C.

Climate data for Wassamu, elevation 150 m (490 ft), (1991−2020 normals, extremes 1977−present)
| Month | Jan | Feb | Mar | Apr | May | Jun | Jul | Aug | Sep | Oct | Nov | Dec | Year |
|---|---|---|---|---|---|---|---|---|---|---|---|---|---|
| Record high °C (°F) | 6.3 (43.3) | 10.5 (50.9) | 14.9 (58.8) | 26.2 (79.2) | 33.6 (92.5) | 36.6 (97.9) | 36.3 (97.3) | 36.8 (98.2) | 32.4 (90.3) | 26.1 (79.0) | 20.1 (68.2) | 12.5 (54.5) | 36.8 (98.2) |
| Mean daily maximum °C (°F) | −4.1 (24.6) | −2.7 (27.1) | 2.1 (35.8) | 9.8 (49.6) | 17.9 (64.2) | 22.4 (72.3) | 25.8 (78.4) | 26.0 (78.8) | 21.5 (70.7) | 14.3 (57.7) | 5.5 (41.9) | −1.5 (29.3) | 11.4 (52.5) |
| Daily mean °C (°F) | −8.3 (17.1) | −7.6 (18.3) | −2.6 (27.3) | 4.5 (40.1) | 11.6 (52.9) | 16.3 (61.3) | 20.1 (68.2) | 20.5 (68.9) | 15.8 (60.4) | 9.0 (48.2) | 1.9 (35.4) | −4.9 (23.2) | 6.4 (43.4) |
| Mean daily minimum °C (°F) | −14.2 (6.4) | −14.1 (6.6) | −8.4 (16.9) | −0.8 (30.6) | 5.5 (41.9) | 10.9 (51.6) | 15.3 (59.5) | 15.9 (60.6) | 10.8 (51.4) | 4.2 (39.6) | −1.7 (28.9) | −9.3 (15.3) | 1.2 (34.1) |
| Record low °C (°F) | −36.8 (−34.2) | −35.2 (−31.4) | −28.7 (−19.7) | −13.7 (7.3) | −4.4 (24.1) | 0.2 (32.4) | 4.5 (40.1) | 5.1 (41.2) | −0.2 (31.6) | −5.5 (22.1) | −21.8 (−7.2) | −30.7 (−23.3) | −36.8 (−34.2) |
| Average precipitation mm (inches) | 61.2 (2.41) | 52.7 (2.07) | 58.6 (2.31) | 53.8 (2.12) | 68.3 (2.69) | 65.1 (2.56) | 128.0 (5.04) | 140.9 (5.55) | 143.3 (5.64) | 115.6 (4.55) | 127.3 (5.01) | 100.4 (3.95) | 1,115 (43.90) |
| Average snowfall cm (inches) | 157 (62) | 133 (52) | 123 (48) | 31 (12) | 0 (0) | 0 (0) | 0 (0) | 0 (0) | 0 (0) | 2 (0.8) | 96 (38) | 197 (78) | 745 (293) |
| Average extreme snow depth cm (inches) | 83 (33) | 99 (39) | 96 (38) | 52 (20) | 0 (0) | 0 (0) | 0 (0) | 0 (0) | 0 (0) | 1 (0.4) | 33 (13) | 68 (27) | 105 (41) |
| Average precipitation days (≥ 1.0 mm) | 17.3 | 14.7 | 15.2 | 11.6 | 10.4 | 9.1 | 10.7 | 11.3 | 13.0 | 15.8 | 19.3 | 21.3 | 169.7 |
| Average snowy days (≥ 3 cm) | 18.5 | 16.5 | 15.1 | 4.3 | 0 | 0 | 0 | 0 | 0 | 0.3 | 8.5 | 19.6 | 82.8 |
| Mean monthly sunshine hours | 56.9 | 77.2 | 113.4 | 153.8 | 176.0 | 154.4 | 150.3 | 147.6 | 142.9 | 115.5 | 53.8 | 36.9 | 1,378.6 |
Source: JMA

=== Demographics ===
Per Japanese census data, the population of Wassamu is as shown below. The town is in a long period of sustained population loss.

Historical population
| Year | Pop. | ±% |
|---|---|---|
| 1940 | 9,837 | — |
| 1950 | 11,560 | +17.5% |
| 1960 | 11,104 | −3.9% |
| 1970 | 8,513 | −23.3% |
| 1980 | 6,696 | −21.3% |
| 1990 | 5,623 | −16.0% |
| 2000 | 4,710 | −16.2% |
| 2010 | 3,832 | −18.6% |
| 2020 | 3,192 | −16.7% |

== History ==
The area of Wassamu was inhabited by Ainu people and the name comes from the Ainu word "wat-sam", which means "next to the elm tree". Wassamu was incorporated as a village 1915 after separating from Kunbuchi. It was raised to town status in 1952.

== Government ==
Wassamu has a mayor-council form of government with a directly elected mayor and a unicameral town council of eight members. Wassamu, collectively with the other municipalities of Kawakami sub-prefecture, contributes three members to the Hokkaidō Prefectural Assembly. In terms of national politics, the town is part of the Hokkaidō 6th district of the lower house of the Diet of Japan.

== Economy ==
The economy of Wassamu is overwhelmingly agricultural. Before World War II, Wassamu was located north of the northern limit of rice cultivation, so pyrethrum was the main crop. After the war, when pyrethrum production moved to China, the fields in the mountains fell into disuse, but as the northern limit of rice cultivation moved northward due to improved varieties, rice suitable for cold climates began to be planted, and the chrysanthemum fields in the flatlands were transformed into farmland. Today, in addition to the largest pumpkin cultivation area in Japan, the village is known for producing "winter cabbage," which is preserved under the snow and shipped in winter.

== Education ==
Wassamu has one public elementary school and one public junior high school operated by the town government, and one private high school.

== Transportation ==
=== Railways ===
- JR Hokkaido - Sōya Main Line
  - ■ Shiokari - Wassamu

=== Highways ===
- Dō-Ō Expressway
- National Route 40

== Notable people from Wassamu ==
- Osamu Watanabe, former freestyle wrestler and Olympic gold medalist
