= Bifuka =

Bifuka 美深町
- Town
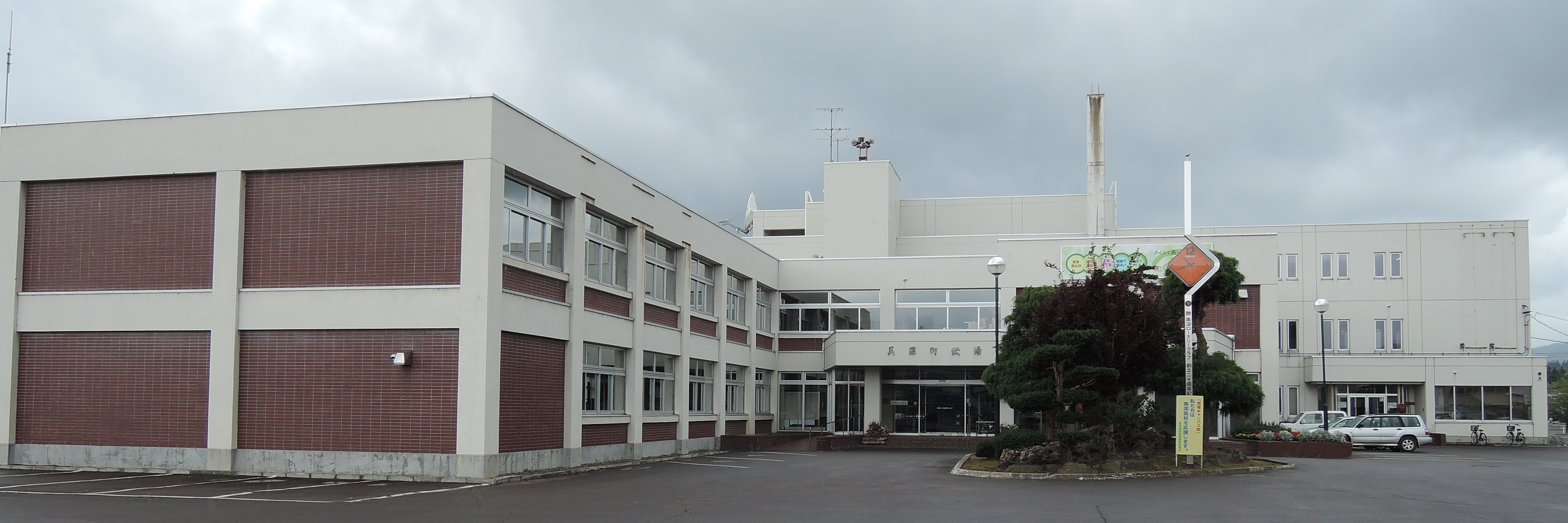
- Bifuka town hall

- Flag Emblem

- Location in Japan
- Coordinates: 44°28′52″N 142°21′35″E
- Country: Japan
- Region: Hokkaido
- Prefecture: Hokkaido (Kamikawa Subprefecture)
- District: Nakagawa (Teshio)

Area
  - Total: 672.09 km^{2} (259.50 sq mi)

Population (January 31, 2025)
  - Total: 3,665
  - Density: 5.453/km^{2} (14.12/sq mi)
- Time zone: UTC+09:00 (JST)
- City hall address: 18 Nishimachi, Bifuka-cho, Nakagawa-gun, Hokkaido 〒098-2252
- Climate: Dfb
- Website: Official website
- Symbols
- Flower: Azalea
- Tree: Ezo spruce

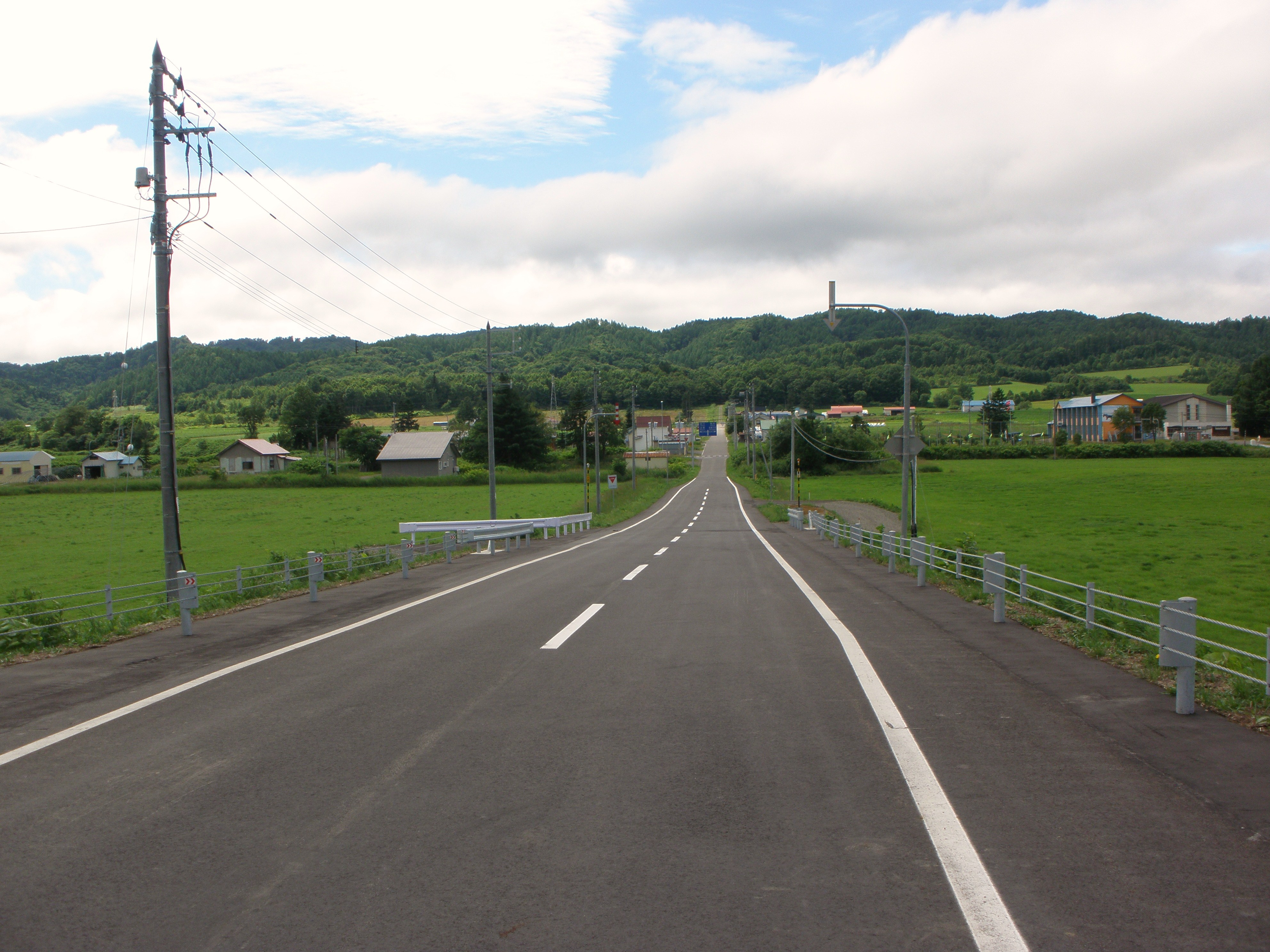
Hokkaido Pref Route 445 in Bifuka

Bifuka (美深町, Bifuka-chō) is a town in Kamikawa Subprefecture, Hokkaido, Japan. As of 31 January 2025, the town had an estimated population of 3,665 in 2016 households, and a population density of 5.5 people per km^{2}. The total area of the town is 672.09 km^{2} (259.50 sq mi).

== Geography ==
Bifuka is located in a valley in the north central region of the island of Hokkaido. The town is surrounded by mountains. The Teshio River flows roughly northwest through Bifuka.

=== Neighboring municipalities ===
Bifuka borders six other municipalities, which span Kamikawa, Okhotsk, and Sōya subprefectures: Kamikawa Subprefecture

- Nayoro
- Otoineppu
- Nakagawa
- Horokanai

Okhotsk Subprefecture

- Ōmu

Sōya Subprefecture

- Esashi

=== Climate ===
Nakagawa has a Humid continental climate (Köppen Dfb) characterized by cold summers and cold winters with heavy snowfall. The average annual temperature in Nakagawa is 4.7 °C. The average annual rainfall is 1337 mm with September as the wettest month. The temperatures are highest on average in August, at around 18.9 °C, and lowest in January, at around −9.3 °C.

Climate data for Bifuka, elevation 77 m (253 ft), (1991–2020 normals, extremes 1977–present)
Month	Jan	Feb	Mar	Apr	May	Jun	Jul	Aug	Sep	Oct	Nov	Dec	Year
Record high °C (°F)	6.4 (43.5)	9.9 (49.8)	13.3 (55.9)	26.7 (80.1)	32.2 (90.0)	34.0 (93.2)	36.6 (97.9)	35.9 (96.6)	31.5 (88.7)	25.7 (78.3)	21.1 (70.0)	9.8 (49.6)	36.6 (97.9)
Mean daily maximum °C (°F)	−4.1 (24.6)	−2.7 (27.1)	2.0 (35.6)	9.2 (48.6)	17.4 (63.3)	22.1 (71.8)	25.5 (77.9)	25.8 (78.4)	21.4 (70.5)	14.2 (57.6)	5.3 (41.5)	−1.8 (28.8)	11.2 (52.1)
Daily mean °C (°F)	−8.6 (16.5)	−8.0 (17.6)	−3.0 (26.6)	3.8 (38.8)	10.7 (51.3)	15.4 (59.7)	19.4 (66.9)	20.1 (68.2)	15.4 (59.7)	8.5 (47.3)	1.5 (34.7)	−5.3 (22.5)	5.8 (42.5)
Mean daily minimum °C (°F)	−14.7 (5.5)	−15.0 (5.0)	−9.0 (15.8)	−1.6 (29.1)	4.3 (39.7)	9.6 (49.3)	14.5 (58.1)	15.5 (59.9)	10.3 (50.5)	3.4 (38.1)	−2.4 (27.7)	−10.0 (14.0)	0.4 (32.7)
Record low °C (°F)	−34.9 (−30.8)	−37.0 (−34.6)	−31.5 (−24.7)	−16.5 (2.3)	−4.3 (24.3)	−0.8 (30.6)	3.3 (37.9)	4.7 (40.5)	0.6 (33.1)	−5.6 (21.9)	−19.6 (−3.3)	−28.3 (−18.9)	−37.0 (−34.6)
Average precipitation mm (inches)	81.0 (3.19)	60.2 (2.37)	60.2 (2.37)	47.5 (1.87)	60.1 (2.37)	64.8 (2.55)	121.1 (4.77)	131.6 (5.18)	136.2 (5.36)	130.7 (5.15)	139.2 (5.48)	126.0 (4.96)	1,158.6 (45.62)
Average snowfall cm (inches)	200 (79)	157 (62)	138 (54)	46 (18)	0 (0)	0 (0)	0 (0)	0 (0)	0 (0)	3 (1.2)	111 (44)	244 (96)	899 (354.2)
Average extreme snow depth cm (inches)	116 (46)	133 (52)	129 (51)	81 (32)	0 (0)	0 (0)	0 (0)	0 (0)	0 (0)	2 (0.8)	35 (14)	91 (36)	137 (54)
Average precipitation days (≥ 1.0 mm)	19.4	15.8	15.6	11.2	10.7	8.8	10.3	11.1	13.3	16.9	20.8	23.7	177.6
Average snowy days (≥ 3.0 cm)	21.2	17.8	17.1	7.2	0	0	0	0	0	0.3	9.7	22.1	95.4
Mean monthly sunshine hours	42.5	66.3	108.4	150.2	181.1	162.3	148.5	140.1	134.7	111.1	48.1	26.5	1,319.8
Source 1: JMA
Source 2: JMA

== Demographics ==
Per Japanese census data, Bifuka has undergone significant population decline over the past half-century.

Historical population
Year	Pop.	±%
1940	11,314	—
1950	13,390	+18.3%
1960	14,046	+4.9%
1970	11,433	−18.6%
1980	8,350	−27.0%
1990	7,103	−14.9%
2000	6,040	−15.0%
2010	5,178	−14.3%
2020	4,145	−19.9%

== History ==
The area of Bifuka has been inhabited since the Jōmon period, and was the site of a kotan was built by the Ainu people. On June 1, 1920, Chiebun Village (now part of Nayoro City) was divided, and Shimonayoro Village is renamed Bifuka Village. In the first census on October 1, 1920, Bifuka Village has 2,045 households and 10,991 inhabitants. It was raised to town status on April 1, 1923.

== Government ==
Bifuka has a mayor-council form of government with a directly elected mayor and a unicameral town council of eight members. Bifuka, collectively with the other municipalities of Kawakami sub-prefecture, contributes three members to the Hokkaidō Prefectural Assembly. In terms of national politics, the town is part of the Hokkaidō 6th district of the lower house of the Diet of Japan.

== Economy ==
The main industries are agriculture, dairy farming, and forestry. Sturgeon, raised in fish farms is a local specialty.

== Education ==
Bifuka has one public elementary schools and one public junior high school operated by the town government, and one public high school (Hokkaido Bifuka High School) operated by the Hokkaidō Board of Education. The prefecture also operates a special education school for the handicapped.

== Transportation ==
=== Railways ===
JR Hokkaido – Sōya Main Line

■ Bifuka

The Soya Main Line previous had Hatsuno – Momponai – Onnenai – Toyoshimizu within Bifuka, but all were closed between 2021 and 2024.

=== Highways ===
- National Route 40
- National Route 275

== Sister city relations ==
- Ashcroft, British Columbia, Canada

== Local attractions ==
- Bifuka Sturgeon Museum, a small facility which maintains eight species of sturgeon. Sturgeon were found in the Teshio River as far as Bifuka until the Meiji Period.
- Bikuka Ski Resort

== Culture ==
=== Mascots ===
Bifuka-kun and Mimi-chan, the town's mascots

Bifuka's mascot are Bifuka-kun (美深くん) and Mimi-chan (美深ちゃん). They are pumpkins who are best friends. Both wear hats made of birch trees. However, Bifuka-kun is a green pumpkin who wears a tie that resembled a sturgeon while Mimi-chan is an orange pumpkin who carries a bag that resembled a sturgeon.
