= Higashikagura =

Higashikagura 東神楽町
- Town
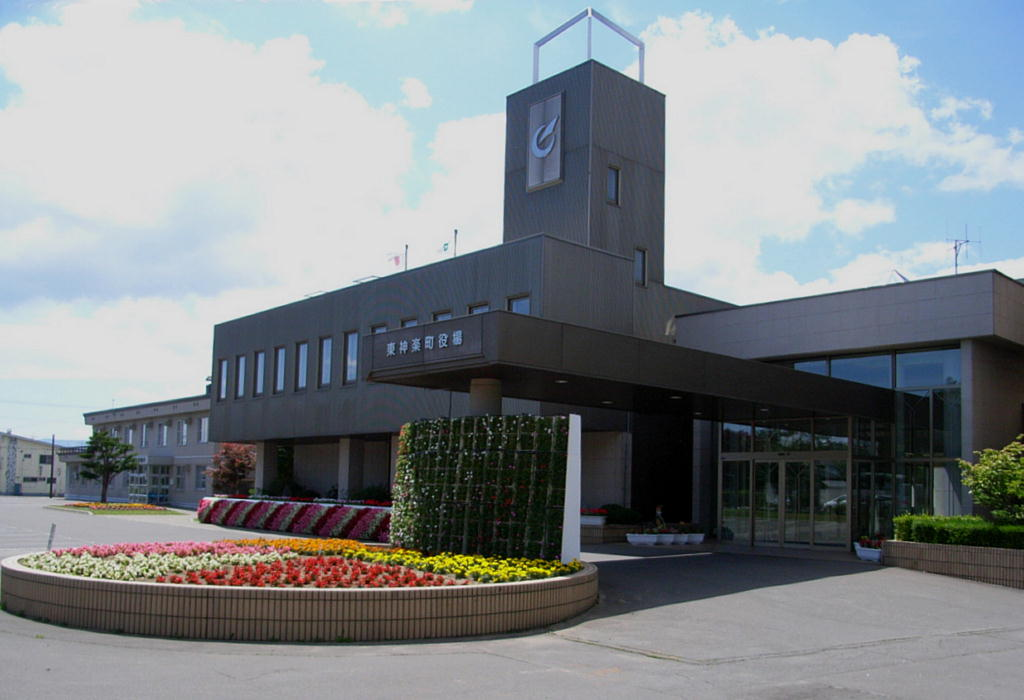
- Higashikagura Town Office

- Flag Emblem

- Location of Higashikagura in Hokkaido (Kamikawa Subprefecture)

- Location in Japan
- Coordinates: 43°42′N 142°27′E
- Country: Japan
- Region: Hokkaido
- Prefecture: Hokkaido (Kamikawa Subprefecture)
- District: Kamikawa (Ishikari)

Area
  - Total: 68.64 km^{2} (26.50 sq mi)

Population (September 30, 2016)
  - Total: 10,385
  - Density: 151.3/km^{2} (391.9/sq mi)
- Time zone: UTC+09:00 (JST)
- Climate: Dfb
- Website: www.town.higashikagura.lg.jp

Higashikagura (東神楽町, Higashikagura-chō) is a town located in Kamikawa Subprefecture, Hokkaido, Japan.

As of September 2016, the town has an estimated population of 10,385, and a density of 150 persons per km^{2}. The total area is 68.64 km^{2}.

Asahikawa Airport is partially in Asahikawa and partially in Higashikagura.

== Climate ==
Climate data for Higashikagura (2003−2020 normals, extremes 2003−present)
Month	Jan	Feb	Mar	Apr	May	Jun	Jul	Aug	Sep	Oct	Nov	Dec	Year
Record high °C (°F)	5.8 (42.4)	11.0 (51.8)	14.3 (57.7)	25.9 (78.6)	34.1 (93.4)	35.4 (95.7)	35.6 (96.1)	36.1 (97.0)	32.0 (89.6)	24.4 (75.9)	20.5 (68.9)	11.7 (53.1)	36.1 (97.0)
Mean daily maximum °C (°F)	−4.1 (24.6)	−2.6 (27.3)	2.3 (36.1)	10.0 (50.0)	17.9 (64.2)	22.4 (72.3)	25.6 (78.1)	26.0 (78.8)	21.6 (70.9)	14.1 (57.4)	5.9 (42.6)	−1.3 (29.7)	11.5 (52.7)
Daily mean °C (°F)	−8.2 (17.2)	−7.3 (18.9)	−2.2 (28.0)	4.5 (40.1)	11.6 (52.9)	16.4 (61.5)	20.0 (68.0)	20.6 (69.1)	15.8 (60.4)	8.6 (47.5)	1.9 (35.4)	−5.0 (23.0)	6.4 (43.5)
Mean daily minimum °C (°F)	−13.7 (7.3)	−13.3 (8.1)	−7.5 (18.5)	−1.0 (30.2)	5.1 (41.2)	10.9 (51.6)	15.2 (59.4)	16.0 (60.8)	10.6 (51.1)	3.4 (38.1)	−2.3 (27.9)	−9.7 (14.5)	1.1 (34.1)
Record low °C (°F)	−27.8 (−18.0)	−28.5 (−19.3)	−21.0 (−5.8)	−11.0 (12.2)	−4.3 (24.3)	−0.1 (31.8)	5.2 (41.4)	5.8 (42.4)	0.2 (32.4)	−5.6 (21.9)	−18.2 (−0.8)	−26.0 (−14.8)	−28.5 (−19.3)
Average precipitation mm (inches)	—	—	—	—	56.7 (2.23)	72.9 (2.87)	114.4 (4.50)	159.8 (6.29)	112.5 (4.43)	83.6 (3.29)	—	—	—
Average snowfall cm (inches)	87 (34)	77 (30)	64 (25)	16 (6.3)	0 (0)	0 (0)	0 (0)	0 (0)	0 (0)	4 (1.6)	60 (24)	117 (46)	424 (167)
Average precipitation days (≥ 1.0 mm)	—	—	—	—	9.6	9.2	9.2	10.9	11.3	13.1	—	—	—
Average snowy days (≥ 3 cm)	12.4	10.2	7.9	1.9	0	0	0	0	0	0.8	6.2	13.7	53.1
Source: JMA

== Culture ==
=== Mascot ===
Kagulucky, the town's mascot

Higashikagura's mascot is Kagulucky (かぐらっき～, Kagurakki~). She is a flower fairy who has a tulip motif. She is also a bringer of luck. If you want her to bring luck, make a "L" hand signal and she will appear.
