= Takasu =

Takasu 鷹栖町
- Town
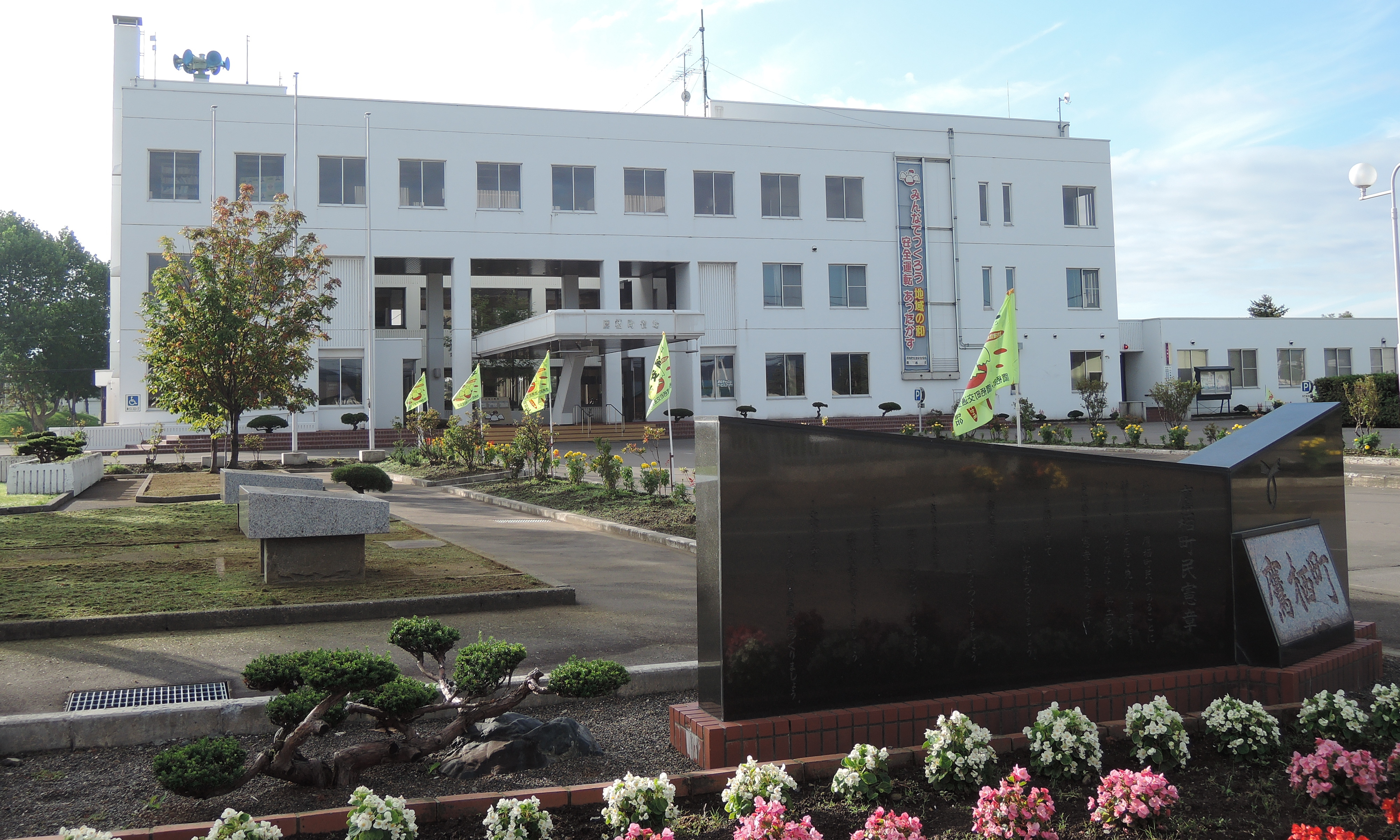
- Takasu town hall

- Flag Emblem
- Location of Takasu in Hokkaido (Kamikawa Subprefecture)

- Location in Japan
- Coordinates: 43°50′36″N 142°21′16″E
- Country: Japan
- Region: Hokkaido
- Prefecture: Hokkaido (Kamikawa Subprefecture)
- District: Kamikawa (Ishikari)

Area
  - Total: 139.42 km^{2} (53.83 sq mi)

Population (February 25, 2025)
  - Total: 6,441
  - Density: 46.20/km^{2} (119.7/sq mi)
- Time zone: UTC+09:00 (JST)
- City hall address: 3 Chome-5-1 Minami 1 Jo, Takasu-chō, Kamikawa-gun, Hokkaido 071-1201
- Website: Official website
- Symbols
- Flower: Marigold
- Tree: Japanese rowan

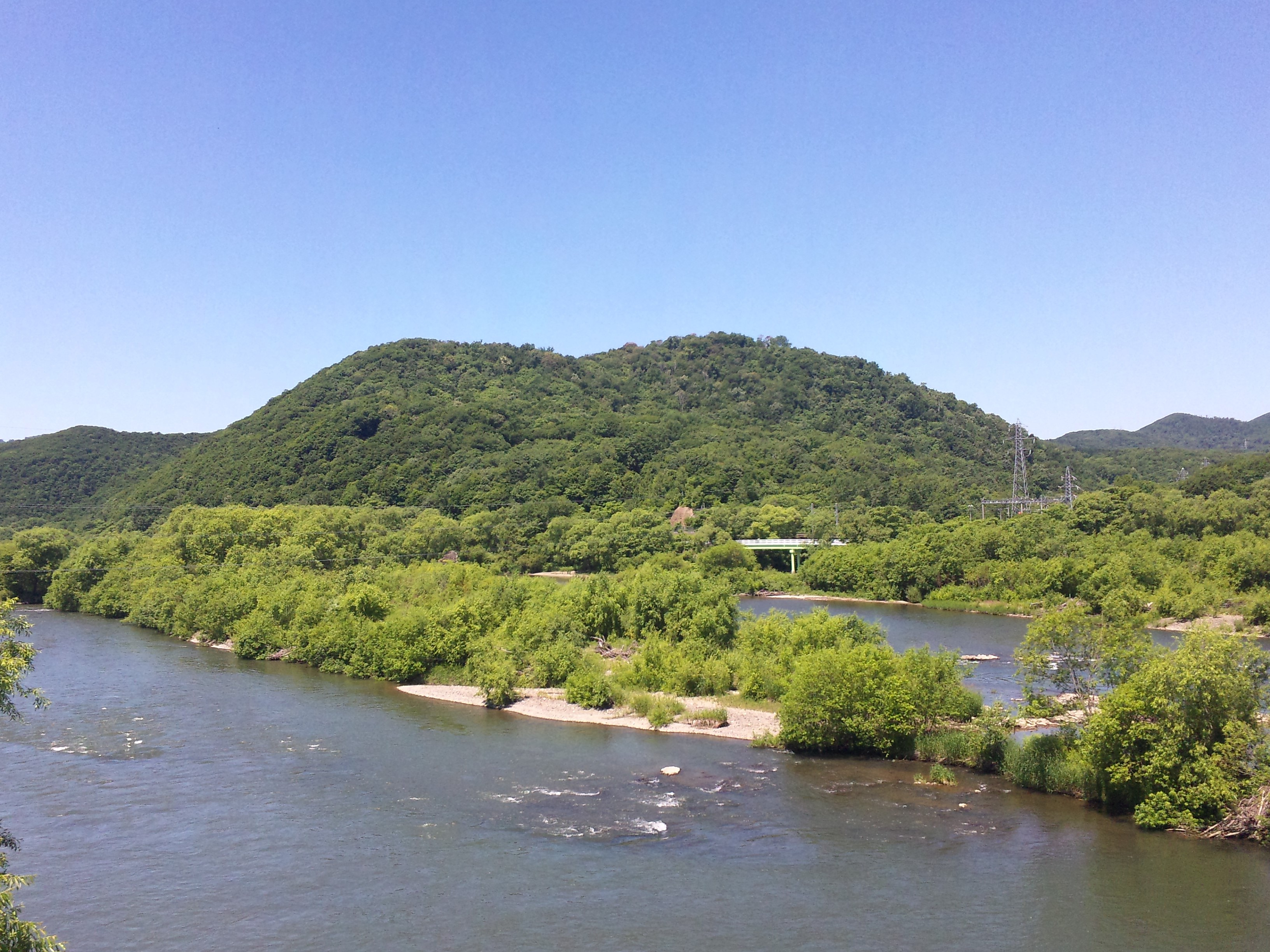
Mt. Arashiyama in Takasu

Takasu (鷹栖町, Takasu-chō) is a town in Kamikawa Subprefecture in Hokkaido, Japan. Translated into English, Takasu means "hawk's nest," the original Ainu name for the town. As of 25 February 2025, the town had an estimated population of 6,441 in 3071 households, and a population density of 21 people per km^{2}. The total area of the town is 139.42 km^{2} (53.83 sq mi).

== Geography ==
Takasu is located in the central area of Hokkaido, the most northern island in Japan. The town is located in central Hokkaido, north of the Kamikawa Basin. It is a small basin surrounded by small hills. Roads are laid out in a grid pattern throughout almost the entire town. The Osarappe River flows from north to south and empties into the Ishikari River at the southern end of the town.

=== Neighbouring municipalities ===
- Hokkaido
  - Asahikawa
  - Wassamu

== Climate ==
From late November to mid-April, Takasu experiences a heavy snowfall, with depths reaching 1.3 metres. Mid-January to late February is the coldest period, with minimum temperatures reaching as low as -30 °C. Summer temperatures occasionally exceed 30 °C; however, low humidity means that Takasu enjoys a mild and comfortable summer.

Overall, Takasu experiences four distinct seasons. Winter brings a heavy blanket of powder snow; in fact, Takasu features the largest snow park in Japan. Spring sees the bloom of cherry blossoms and beach morning glory; summer provides a landscape filled with green, as harvest prospers; and the autumn brings the crisp red leaves of Japanese maple trees.

=== Demographics ===
Per Japanese census data, the population of Takasu is as shown below. The town is in a long period of sustained population loss.

Historical population
Year	Pop.	±%
1940	9,019	—
1950	9,837	+9.1%
1960	10,436	+6.1%
1970	7,943	−23.9%
1980	7,509	−5.5%
1990	6,930	−7.7%
2000	7,165	+3.4%
2010	7,345	+2.5%
2020	6,567	−10.6%

== History ==
The area of Pippu was part of Matsumae Domain in the Edo period. In 1892, the area on the right bank of the Ishikari River in Kamikawa County, Ishikari Province, was made Takasu Village. In 1906, Pippu was separated from Takasu. On June 4, 1924, this Takasu Village was divided into three villages: Higashitakasu Village (currently Higashitakasu District of Asahikawa City), Takasu Village (currently Takasu Town), and Etanbetsu Village (currently Etanbetsu District of Asahikawa City). Takasu was elevated to town status in 1969.

== Government ==
Takasu has a mayor-council form of government with a directly elected mayor and a unicameral town council of 12 members. Takasu, collectively with the other municipalities of Kawakami sub-prefecture, contributes three members to the Hokkaidō Prefectural Assembly. In terms of national politics, the town is part of the Hokkaidō 6th district of the lower house of the Diet of Japan.

== Economy ==
With an abundance of fertile land, Takasu has developed an agricultural sector centred on rice growing. Rice accounts for 80 per cent of Takasu's total agricultural product. In recent years, Takasu has been one of the eminent producers of Hokkaido Hoshi no Yume and Kirara 397 rice in terms of quality and harvest. The next biggest industry in Takasu is the production of vegetables, particularly tomatoes. Takasu is the centre of production for a range of Ookami no momo brand tomato products, such as tomato juice and puree. It also ranks in the top 20 cucumber producers in Japan.

Takasu is also home to one of Honda's "Proving Grounds". Honda tests new products to see how they stand up to the harsh winter conditions found in central Hokkaido. The other Honda development facility is found in Tochigi Prefecture. Honda not only test cars at the Takasu Proving Grounds, but bikes and snowblowers.

== Education ==
Takasu has two public elementary schools and one public junior high school operated by the town government, and one public high school operated by the Hokkaido Prefectural Board of Education.

Takasu has a domestic school exchange program with Takashima Town in Nagasaki Prefecture. Since 1996 a delegation of ten students from each town visits the other, and stays with local families. The purpose of this domestic exchange program is to strengthen friendship and understanding between citizens in the two towns.

== Transportation ==
=== Railways ===
The Hokkaido Railway Company (JR Hokkaido) Hakodate Main Line passes through the southern end of the town near the Arashiyama Tunnel between Osamunai Station and Chikabumi Station, but there is no station within Takasu town limits. Konbun Station and Nagayama Station on the Sōya Main Line (both in Asahikawa City) are close to the town.

=== Highways ===
- Dō-Ō Expressway

== Sister cities ==
- Gold Coast, Australia. This relationship initially commenced in 1991, as a friendly relations agreement with the Albert Shire region of the Gold Coast. Upon the Albert Shire's amalgamation with the Gold Coast City, the relationship between Takasu and the Gold Coast was upgraded to an official Sister City Agreement in 1995.

== Culture ==
=== Mascot ===
Attakasu-kun, the town's mascot

Takasu's mascot is Attakasu-kun (あったかすくん). He is a hawk. He carries a flask of Ōkaminomomo (オオカミの桃) "Wolf's Peach" tomato juice in his blue backpack. He sometimes disguises himself as a snowman. He first appeared on 8 August 1995 as an unofficial mascot, before being promoted to official mascot in 2013.

== Emblem and symbols ==
The Takasu town emblem was established on January 1, 1968, from ideas submitted by the local citizens. The town emblem incorporates four meaningful elements. Firstly, it is a modern representation of a hawk, the town's namesake, with wings spread in full flight. The oval in the centre symbolises a grain of rice, which is a major produce in Takasu. Finally, the single line making a circle symbolises the harmony and unity between the citizens, while the twist of the line represents the bright future of Takasu.
