= Minamifurano =

Minamifurano 南富良野町
- Town
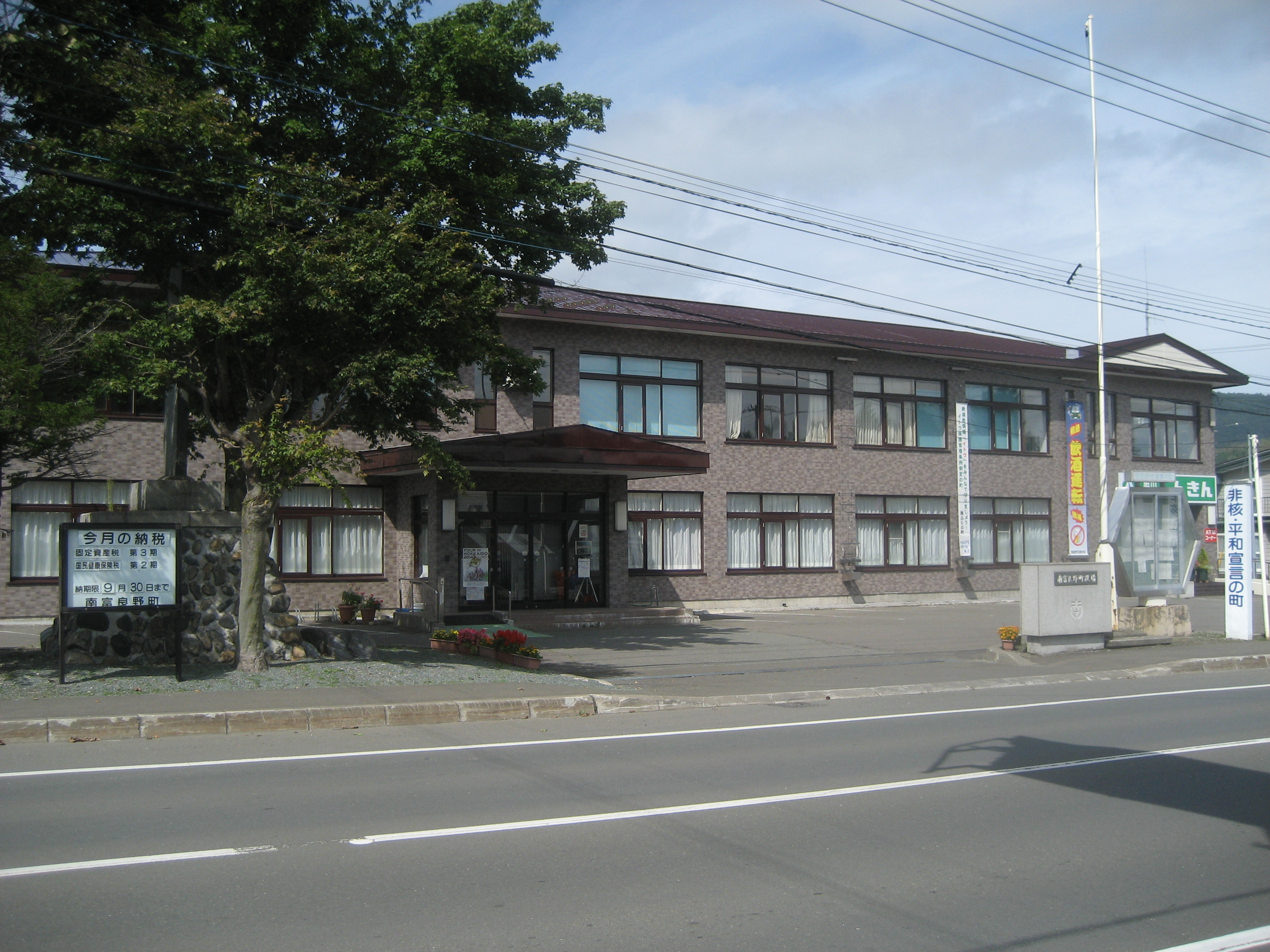
- Minami Furano town hall

- Flag Emblem

- Location of Minamifurano in Hokkaido (Kamikawa Subprefecture)

- Location in Japan
- Coordinates: 43°10′N 142°34′E
- Country: Japan
- Region: Hokkaido
- Prefecture: Hokkaido (Kamikawa Subprefecture)
- District: Sorachi

Area
  - Total: 665.52 km^{2} (256.96 sq mi)

Population (September 30, 2016)
  - Total: 2,611
  - Density: 3.923/km^{2} (10.16/sq mi)
- Time zone: UTC+09:00 (JST)
- Website: town.minamifurano.hokkaido.jp

Minamifurano (南富良野町, Minamifurano-chō) is a town located in Kamikawa Subprefecture, Hokkaido, Japan.

As of September 2016, the town has an estimated population of 2,611 and a density of 3.9 persons per km^{2}. The total area is 665.52 km^{2}.

== Culture ==
=== Mascot ===
Minami-chan, the town's mascot

Minamifurano's mascot is Minami-chan (南ちゃん). She is a girl who wears a helmet resembling a curling rock and her clothes and hairclips resembles carrots and her bag resembles corn. She was unveiled in 2018.

== Transportation ==
=== Highway ===
- National Route 38
- National Route 237

== Sister cities ==
(Okinawa Prefecture) Motobu, Japan, 1996

== Climate ==
Climate data for Minamifurano (Ikutora), elevation 350 m (1,150 ft), (1991–2020 normals, extremes 1977–present)
Month	Jan	Feb	Mar	Apr	May	Jun	Jul	Aug	Sep	Oct	Nov	Dec	Year
Record high °C (°F)	7.2 (45.0)	12.6 (54.7)	15.3 (59.5)	26.2 (79.2)	32.6 (90.7)	33.5 (92.3)	34.0 (93.2)	34.9 (94.8)	32.1 (89.8)	26.3 (79.3)	19.1 (66.4)	12.1 (53.8)	34.9 (94.8)
Mean daily maximum °C (°F)	−3.7 (25.3)	−2.6 (27.3)	1.7 (35.1)	8.9 (48.0)	16.4 (61.5)	20.7 (69.3)	24.1 (75.4)	24.3 (75.7)	20.2 (68.4)	13.6 (56.5)	5.6 (42.1)	−1.3 (29.7)	10.7 (51.2)
Daily mean °C (°F)	−8.4 (16.9)	−7.6 (18.3)	−2.8 (27.0)	3.8 (38.8)	10.4 (50.7)	14.9 (58.8)	18.8 (65.8)	19.2 (66.6)	14.8 (58.6)	8.0 (46.4)	1.5 (34.7)	−5.2 (22.6)	5.6 (42.1)
Mean daily minimum °C (°F)	−14.6 (5.7)	−14.4 (6.1)	−8.6 (16.5)	−1.6 (29.1)	4.2 (39.6)	9.6 (49.3)	14.4 (57.9)	14.9 (58.8)	9.9 (49.8)	2.7 (36.9)	−2.8 (27.0)	−10.3 (13.5)	0.3 (32.5)
Record low °C (°F)	−32.2 (−26.0)	−33.4 (−28.1)	−31.2 (−24.2)	−18.5 (−1.3)	−4.6 (23.7)	−1.1 (30.0)	3.2 (37.8)	3.4 (38.1)	−2.0 (28.4)	−7.5 (18.5)	−20.0 (−4.0)	−28.2 (−18.8)	−33.4 (−28.1)
Average precipitation mm (inches)	38.4 (1.51)	32.8 (1.29)	54.2 (2.13)	72.4 (2.85)	82.8 (3.26)	71.0 (2.80)	119.3 (4.70)	187.0 (7.36)	153.3 (6.04)	112.2 (4.42)	100.8 (3.97)	66.5 (2.62)	1,090.7 (42.95)
Average snowfall cm (inches)	130 (51)	111 (44)	115 (45)	37 (15)	0 (0)	0 (0)	0 (0)	0 (0)	0 (0)	4 (1.6)	58 (23)	147 (58)	601 (237)
Average extreme snow depth cm (inches)	66 (26)	75 (30)	77 (30)	37 (15)	0 (0)	0 (0)	0 (0)	0 (0)	0 (0)	2 (0.8)	17 (6.7)	46 (18)	84 (33)
Average precipitation days (≥ 1.0 mm)	11.4	10.4	12.5	12.7	11.3	9.3	11.2	11.6	12.6	13.4	15.0	14.4	145.8
Average snowy days (≥ 3.0 cm)	16.6	15.3	14.4	5.1	0.1	0	0	0	0	0.3	6.4	17.7	75.9
Mean monthly sunshine hours	88.5	95.2	123.1	153.8	176.1	162.3	153.2	146.9	139.0	131.5	82.4	67.1	1,519.1
Source 1: Japan Meteorological Agency
Source 2: Japan Meteorological Agency
