= Teshio River =

River in Hokkaido, Japan

Teshio River 天塩川
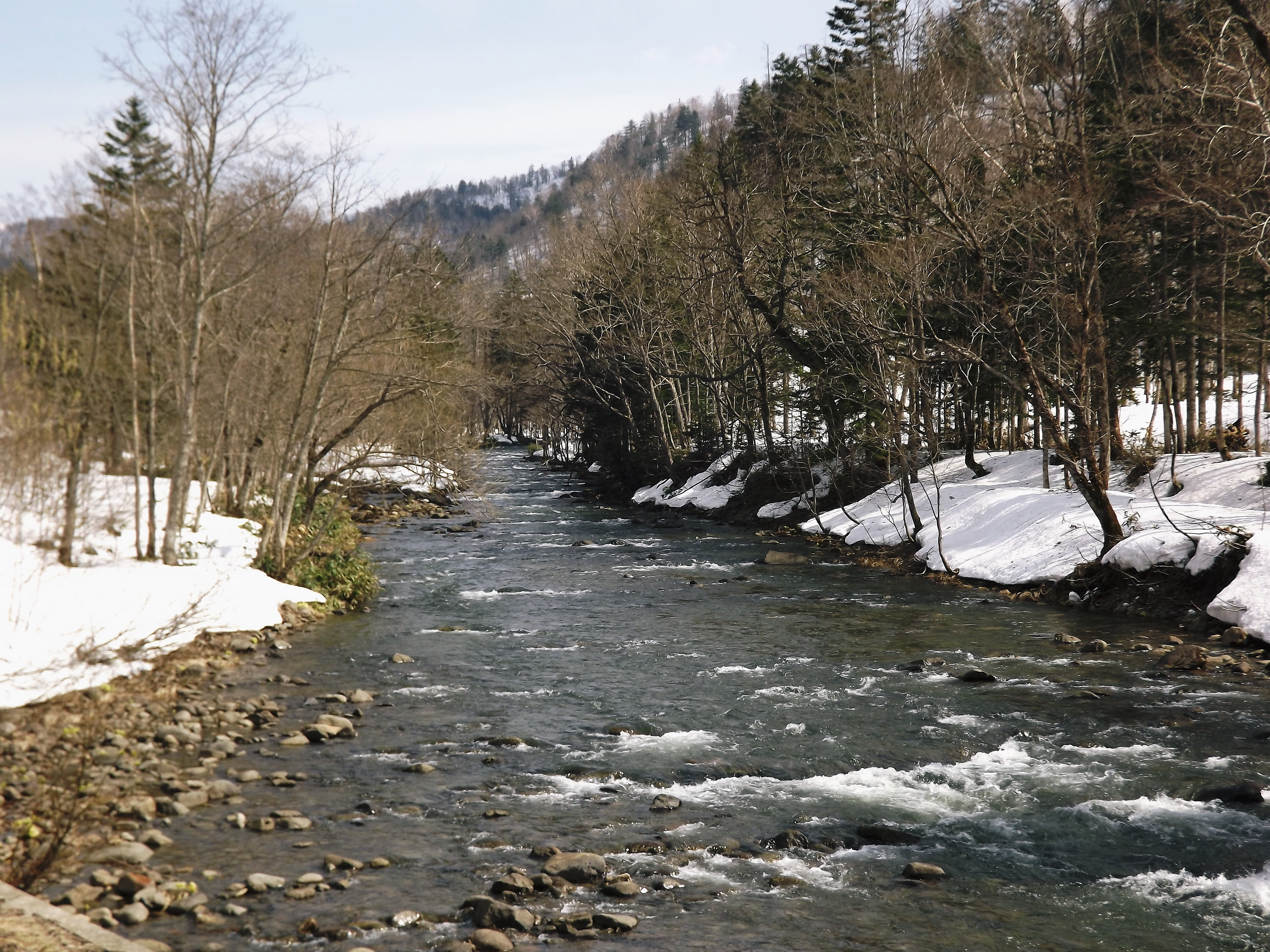
- Teshio River in Shibetsu

- Location within Japan
- Native name: Teshio-gawa (Japanese)

Location
- Country: Japan
- State: Hokkaido
- Region: Rumoi, Kamikawa, Sōya
- Municipalities: Bifuka, Horonobe, Kenbuchi, Nakagawa, Nayoro, Otoineppu, Shibetsu, Shimokawa, Teshio, Toyotomi, Wakkanai, Wassamu

Physical characteristics
- Source: Mount Teshio
  - location: Shibetsu, Hokkaido, Japan
  - coordinates: 43°57′52″N 142°52′51″E
  - elevation: 1,558 m (5,112 ft)
- Mouth: Sea of Japan
  - location: Teshio and Horonobe, Hokkaido, Japan
  - coordinates: 44°52′44″N 141°44′18″E
  - elevation: 0 m (0 ft)
- Length: 256 km (159 mi)
- Basin size: 5,590 km^{2} (2,160 sq mi)
- Discharge
  - average: 110 m^{3}/s (3,900 cu ft/s)

The Teshio River (天塩川, Teshio-gawa) is a river in Hokkaido, Japan. At 256 kilometres (159 mi), it is the second-longest river on the island (after the Ishikari) and the fourth-longest in the country (after the Shinano, Tone, and Ishikari). A Class A river, the Teshio is the northernmost major river in Japan, and has been designated Hokkaidō Heritage. Matsuura Takeshirō is said to have come up with the name "Hokkaidō" during his exploration of the river's interior.

== Name ==
The name of the river derives from the Ainu tesh・o・pet (テシ・オ・ペッ), meaning "river full of fishing weirs", perhaps because of rocks dotted across the river in such a shape. Alternatively, there is a locale in Bifuka that has been designated a municipal Historic Site as the "Place of Derivation of the Teshio River" (天塩川由来の地) on the basis that it was while staying here, during his exploration to the source of the river, on the seventh day of the sixth month of Ansei 4 (1857), there being a fishing weir at the spot, that Matsuura Takeshirō (松浦武四郎) recorded the river's name. Due to works on the river in recent years the rocks in its middle course that perhaps inspired the name themselves largely no longer exist.

== Geography ==
The river's source is at Mount Teshio (1,558 metres (5,112 ft)), highest of the Kitami Mountains. Flowing down through the mountain valleys from its origins in Shibetsu, it is fed by tributaries (of which it has some 160) including the Nayoro River (名寄川), then crosses the mountain plains, passing next through the more-constricted topography of Otoineppu before entering the Teshio Plain, where it meanders until flowing into the Sea of Japan at Teshio. The lower 158 kilometres (98 mi) are, unusually, unbroken by dams and weirs and can be navigated uninterrupted.

In the river basin, which has an area of 5,590 square kilometres (2,160 sq mi), there are twelve municipalities:

- Kamikawa Subprefecture: Bifuka, Kenbuchi, Nakagawa, Nayoro, Otoineppu, Shibetsu, Shimokawa, Wassamu
- Rumoi Subprefecture: Teshio
- Sōya Subprefecture: Horonobe, Toyotomi, Wakkanai

As of the 2010 census, some 122,000 people lived in the basin.

== History ==
It is believed the first humans arrived in the Teshio River system approximately fifteen thousand years ago. At the Kawaguchi Site (川口遺跡) in Teshio, where the river enters the Sea of Japan, remains of some two hundred and thirty pit dwellings have been discovered, with deposits of the Zoku-Jōmon period as well as of the Satsumon and Okhotsk cultures. Opening of the Teshio Trading Station (天塩場所), similarly at the mouth of the river, in Tenmei 6 (1786) marked the advent of the Wajin and their trade with the Ainu of the interior. The first survey of the river was conducted by three men under Takahashi Sōshirō (高橋壮四郎), retainer of the Matsumae Domain, in Kansei 9 (1797), from its lower stretches as far as Otoineppu. In Ansei 4 (1857), Matsuura Takeshirō spent twenty-four days exploring the Teshio River, starting from its mouth; he subsequently wrote up his account of the river and those who lived along it in his Teshio Diaries (天塩日誌). It was from the tales he heard from an Ainu elder living in the area of Otoineppu that Matsuura conceived of the name "Hokkaidō".

Following the establishment of the Hokkaidō Development Commission (開拓使) in Meiji 2 (1869), settler-farmers began to arrive. After major floods in 1898, a need was identified for flood mitigation measures all over the island. After detailed surveying of the river between 1906 and 1908, and further flooding, a flood control plan for the Teshio River was first drafted in Taishō 8 (1919). There ensued a programme of bank reinforcement, embankment construction, and channel switching. After flooding continued to adversely affect the local farmers' potatoes, the Shōwa era saw further channel switching and the excavation of new waterways. A typhoon in 1981 and the heaviest rainfall since the war saw an area of 156 square kilometres (60 sq mi) inundated, with damage to 546 houses, while the typhoons of 2016 left 72 homes flooded.

The river's history is documented at the Teshio River Historical Museum (天塩川歴史資料館) in Teshio.

== Economy ==
In the upstream areas of Shibetsu and Shimokawa, the lumber industry exploits the abundant forests of the interior. The Nayoro basin between Nayoro and Bifuka marks the northern limit of rice cultivation. Downstream, on the Teshio Plain, there is dairy farming, while near the river mouth there is salmon and trout fishing and also the prefecture's most intensive harvesting of shijimi clams. Water sports include canoeing—there is an annual race "Daun za Tesshi o pet" (ダウン・ザ・テッシ・オ・ペッ).

== Ecology ==
The mountainous area upstream extends to the Daisetsuzan National Park, while Teshiodake Prefectural Natural Park has many alpine plants. Nearer the river mouth is Rishiri-Rebun-Sarobetsu National Park, with more than a hundred species of flora including hamanasu, the Siberian lily, Japanese irises, and Hemerocallis esculenta (エゾカンゾウ). Fauna of the river system include the Tōkyō lesser pigmy shrew, migratory White-tailed eagle (a Natural Monument), Steller's sea eagle (Natural Monument), Taiga bean goose (Natural Monument), and Sakhalin taimen. The Penke (ペンケ沼) and Panke (パンケ沼) marshes are an important resting place for migratory waterfowl, and the Sarobetsu wetlands have been designated a Ramsar Site, the Sarobetsu River (サロベツ川) being a tributary of the Teshio.

== See also ==
- List of Natural Monuments of Japan (Hokkaidō)
- List of Ramsar sites in Japan
- Tondenhei
- Wildlife Protection Areas in Japan
