= Nakagawa, Hokkaido =

Nakagawa 中川町
- Town
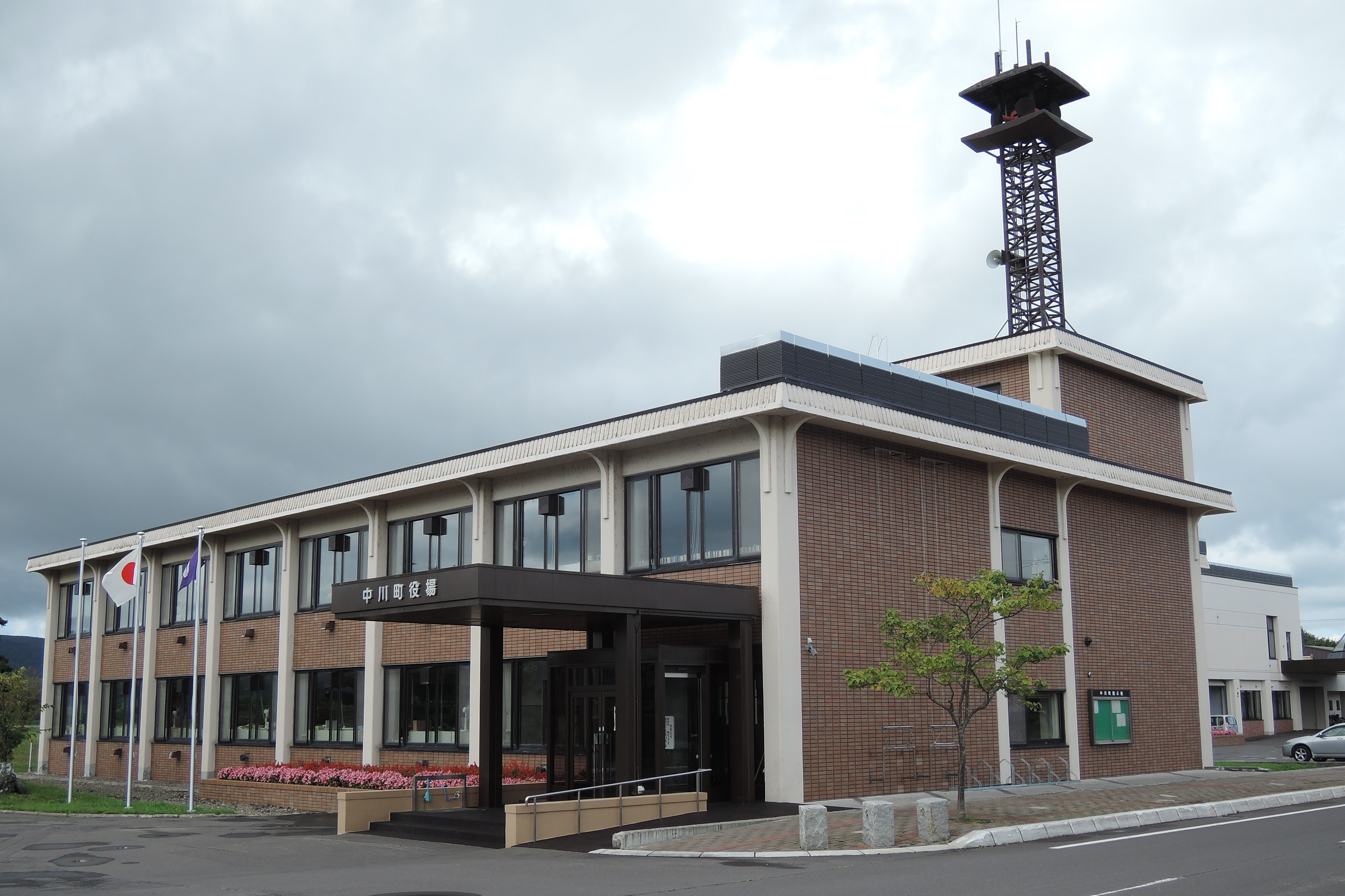
- Nakagawa town hall

- Flag Seal
- Location of Nakagawa in Hokkaido (Kamikawa Subprefecture)

- Location in Japan
- Coordinates: 44°48′40″N 142°4′17″E
- Country: Japan
- Region: Hokkaido
- Prefecture: Hokkaido (Kamikawa Subprefecture)
- District: Nakagawa (Teshio)

Area
  - Total: 594.74 km^{2} (229.63 sq mi)

Population (December 31, 2024)
  - Total: 1,266
  - Density: 2.129/km^{2} (5.513/sq mi)
- Time zone: UTC+09:00 (JST)
- City hall address: 337 Nakagawa, Nakagawa-cho, Nakagawa-gun, Hokkaido 098-2892
- Climate: Dfb
- Website: Official website
- Symbols
- Flower: Azalea
- Tree: Japanese yew

Nakagawa (中川町, Nakagawa-chō) is a town located in Kamikawa Subprefecture, Hokkaido, Japan. As of 31 December 2024, the town had an estimated population of 1,266 in 706 households, and a population density of 2.1 people per km^{2}. The total area of the town is 594.74 km^{2} (229.63 sq mi). Nakagawa is known for ammonites and other fossils. Its local specialties include sausage and hand-made wood products.

== Geography ==
Nakagawa is located an inland area in the northernmost part of the Kamikawa Subprefecture. Surrounded by mountains on both the east and west, the town is located along the Teshio River which runs from east to northwest through the town.

=== Neighbouring municipalities ===
- Hokkaido
  - Bifuka
  - Otoineppu
  - Horokanai
  - Nakatonbetsu
  - Horonobe
  - Teshio
  - Enbetsu

== Climate ==
Nakagawa has a Humid continental climate (Köppen Dfb) characterized by cold summers and cold winters with heavy snowfall. The average annual temperature in Nakagawa is 5.9 °C. The average annual rainfall is 1311 mm with September as the wettest month. The temperatures are highest on average in August, at around 19.6 °C, and lowest in January, at around -7.4 °C.

Climate data for Nakagawa, elevation 22 m (72 ft), (1991−2020 normals, extremes 1977−present)
Month	Jan	Feb	Mar	Apr	May	Jun	Jul	Aug	Sep	Oct	Nov	Dec	Year
Record high °C (°F)	8.8 (47.8)	8.4 (47.1)	15.2 (59.4)	24.5 (76.1)	30.2 (86.4)	32.4 (90.3)	36.2 (97.2)	35.7 (96.3)	33.9 (93.0)	25.4 (77.7)	18.7 (65.7)	12.4 (54.3)	36.2 (97.2)
Mean daily maximum °C (°F)	−3.1 (26.4)	−2.2 (28.0)	2.0 (35.6)	8.7 (47.7)	16.0 (60.8)	20.1 (68.2)	23.8 (74.8)	24.7 (76.5)	21.2 (70.2)	14.4 (57.9)	5.9 (42.6)	−0.8 (30.6)	10.9 (51.6)
Daily mean °C (°F)	−7.5 (18.5)	−7.2 (19.0)	−2.4 (27.7)	3.8 (38.8)	10.0 (50.0)	14.2 (57.6)	18.3 (64.9)	19.4 (66.9)	15.2 (59.4)	8.8 (47.8)	2.1 (35.8)	−4.2 (24.4)	5.9 (42.6)
Mean daily minimum °C (°F)	−13.4 (7.9)	−14.1 (6.6)	−8.3 (17.1)	−1.6 (29.1)	3.8 (38.8)	8.6 (47.5)	13.4 (56.1)	14.7 (58.5)	9.4 (48.9)	3.2 (37.8)	−1.8 (28.8)	−8.7 (16.3)	0.4 (32.8)
Record low °C (°F)	−35.6 (−32.1)	−30.6 (−23.1)	−25.6 (−14.1)	−13.8 (7.2)	−4.8 (23.4)	−1.7 (28.9)	2.7 (36.9)	3.8 (38.8)	−0.1 (31.8)	−6.3 (20.7)	−15.6 (3.9)	−27.5 (−17.5)	−35.6 (−32.1)
Average precipitation mm (inches)	89.2 (3.51)	60.6 (2.39)	63.6 (2.50)	54.0 (2.13)	68.6 (2.70)	60.4 (2.38)	114.4 (4.50)	151.3 (5.96)	136.8 (5.39)	160.3 (6.31)	156.7 (6.17)	132.5 (5.22)	1,248.3 (49.15)
Average precipitation days (≥ 1.0 mm)	21.0	16.4	15.2	11.8	10.5	9.2	9.8	11.3	12.8	16.8	20.8	23.8	179.4
Mean monthly sunshine hours	47.8	69.6	115.1	152.1	185.1	157.8	145.5	141.1	161.3	112.9	46.1	26.7	1,361.1
Source: JMA

=== Demographics ===
Per Japanese census data, the population of Nakagawa is as shown below. The town is in a long period of sustained population loss.

Historical population
Year	Pop.	±%
1940	6,403	—
1950	6,937	+8.3%
1960	6,591	−5.0%
1970	4,736	−28.1%
1980	3,559	−24.9%
1990	2,788	−21.7%
2000	2,464	−11.6%
2010	1,906	−22.6%
2020	1,528	−19.8%

== History ==
The area of Nakagawa has been settled since Japanese Paleolithic times, and numerous Jomon period artifacts have been found. The Ainu people had hamlets along the Teshio River. During the Edo period, the area of Nakagawa was part of the territory of the Matsumae Domain. The area was explored by Matsuura Takeshirō in 1857, but the first Japanese settler did not arrive until 1896. Nakagawa was incorporated as a village on April 1, 1919. It was raised to town status in 1964.

== Government ==
Nakagawa has a mayor-council form of government with a directly elected mayor and a unicameral town council of eight members. Nakagawa, collectively with the other municipalities of Kawakami sub-prefecture, contributes three members to the Hokkaidō Prefectural Assembly. In terms of national politics, the town is part of the Hokkaidō 6th district of the lower house of the Diet of Japan.

== Economy ==
The economy of Nakagawa is overwhelmingly agricultural.

== Education ==
Nakagawa has one public elementary school and one public junior high school operated by the town government. The town does not have a high school.

== Transportation ==
=== Railways ===
JR Hokkaido - Sōya Main Line

■ Saku - Teshio-Nakagawa

=== Highways ===
- National Route 40

== Local attractions ==
- Eco Museum Center, which features fossils found in the area.

== Culture ==
=== Mascot ===
Jueru, the town's mascot

Nakagawa's mascot is Jueru (じゅえる, Ji~yueru). He is a shape-shaping leaf who lives in a green town since the town's ancient times. He was discovered in September 2012.

Nakagawa has another mascot, a dinosaur that is featured on the town's country sign.
