= Teshio, Hokkaido =

Teshio 天塩町
- Town
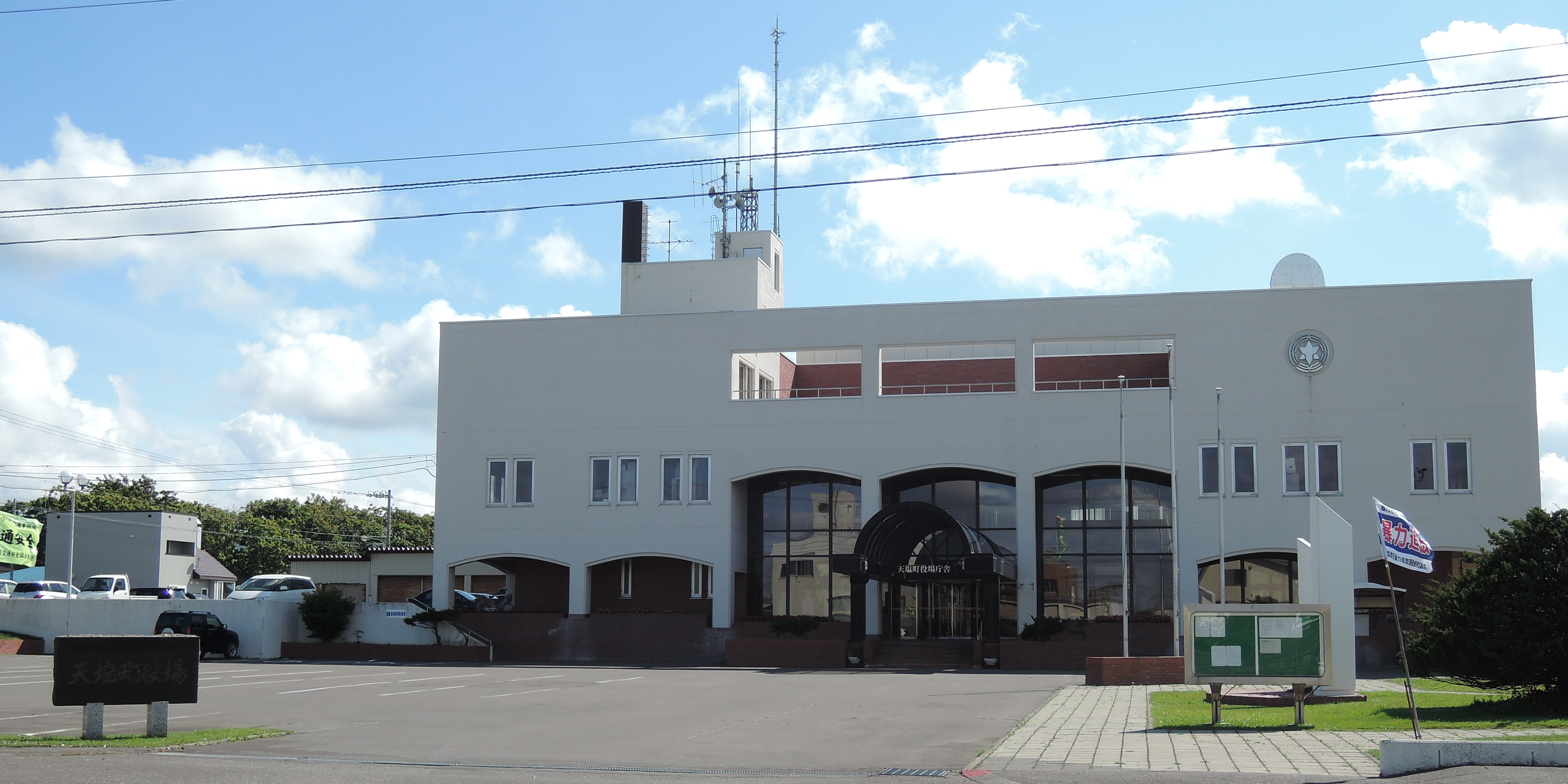
- Teshio town hall

- Flag Seal
- Location of Teshio in Hokkaido (Rumoi Subprefecture)

- Location in Japan
- Coordinates: 44°53′17″N 141°44′43″E
- Country: Japan
- Region: Hokkaido
- Prefecture: Hokkaido (Rumoi Subprefecture)
- District: Teshio

Area
  - Total: 353.56 km^{2} (136.51 sq mi)

Population (December 31, 2024)
  - Total: 2,642
  - Density: 7.473/km^{2} (19.35/sq mi)
- Time zone: UTC+09:00 (JST)
- City hall address: 1466-113, Shin-Eidori 8-chome, Teshio-gun, Teshio-cho, Hokkaido 098-3398
- Climate: Dfb
- Website: Official website
- Symbols
- Bird: Poecile montanus
- Flower: Rosa rugosa
- Tree: Prunus sargentii

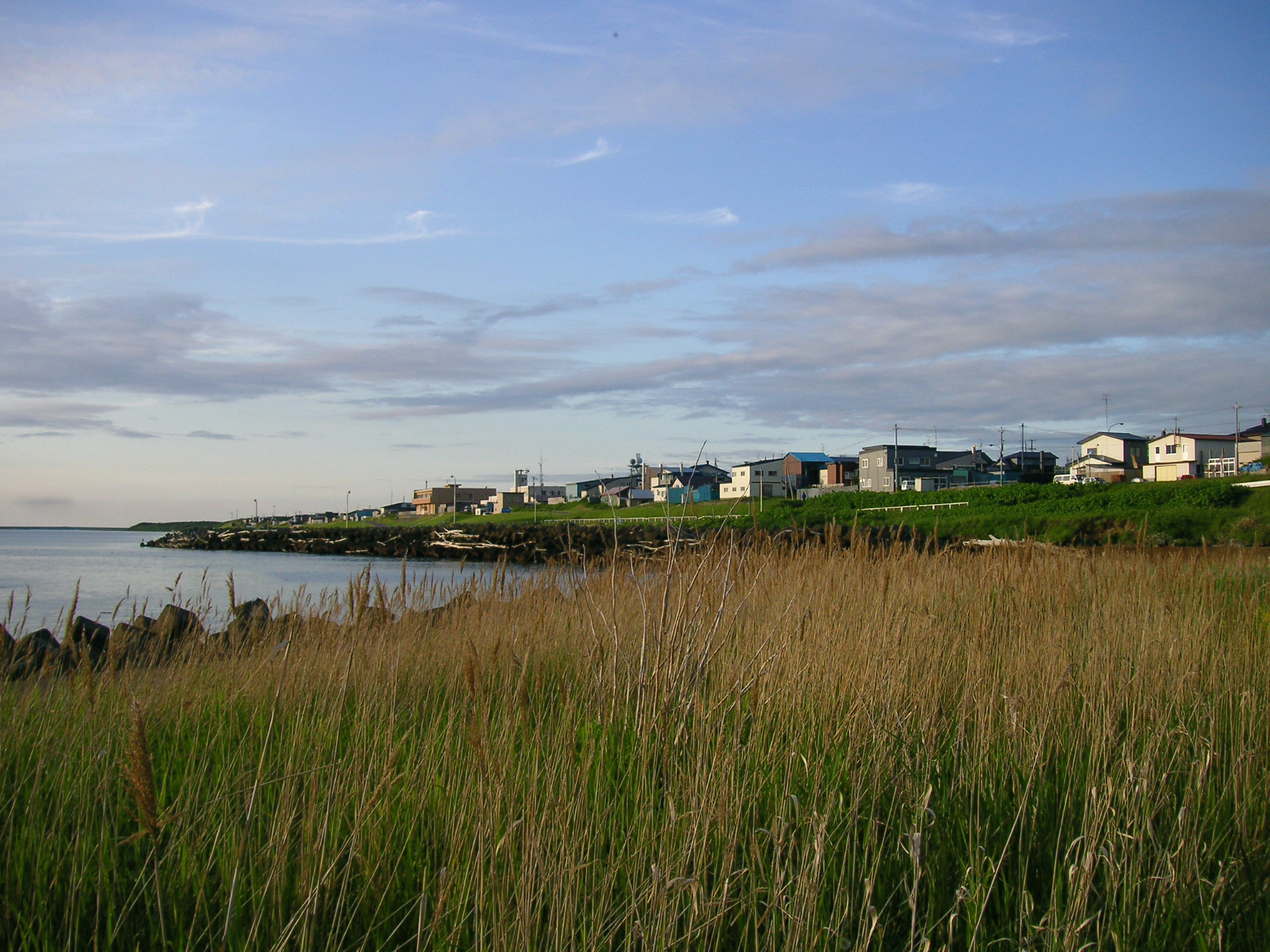
A view of Teshio from the coast

Teshio (天塩町, Teshio-chō) is a town located in Rumoi, Hokkaido, Japan. As of 31 December 2024, the town had an estimated population of 2,642 in 1,444 households, and a population density of 7.5 people per km^{2}. The total area of the town is 353.56 km^{2} (136.51 sq mi).

== Geography ==
Teshio is located in the northernmost part of Rumoi jurisdiction in northern Hokkaido, surrounded by the left bank of the downstream Teshio River. The central town area, where the town hall is located, is at the mouth of the river, and the hamlet of Onobunai is located along Japan National Route 40.

=== Neighbouring municipalities ===
- Hokkaido
  - Enbetsu
  - Horonobe
  - Nakagawa

== Climate ==
Teshio has a Humid continental climate (Köppen Dfb) characterized by warm rainy summers and cold winters with heavy snowfall. The average annual temperature in Teshio is 6.9 °C. The average annual rainfall is 1176 mm with September as the wettest month. The temperatures are highest on average in August, at around 20.1 °C, and lowest in January, at around -5.2 °C.

Climate data for Teshio, elevation 9 m (30 ft), (1991−2020 normals, extremes 1977−present)
Month	Jan	Feb	Mar	Apr	May	Jun	Jul	Aug	Sep	Oct	Nov	Dec	Year
Record high °C (°F)	7.9 (46.2)	7.9 (46.2)	13.6 (56.5)	21.4 (70.5)	25.9 (78.6)	30.0 (86.0)	33.8 (92.8)	32.5 (90.5)	32.3 (90.1)	23.1 (73.6)	17.2 (63.0)	12.3 (54.1)	33.8 (92.8)
Mean daily maximum °C (°F)	−2.3 (27.9)	−1.8 (28.8)	1.9 (35.4)	8.1 (46.6)	14.0 (57.2)	18.3 (64.9)	22.3 (72.1)	23.6 (74.5)	20.8 (69.4)	14.4 (57.9)	6.7 (44.1)	0.3 (32.5)	10.5 (50.9)
Daily mean °C (°F)	−5.4 (22.3)	−5.3 (22.5)	−1.4 (29.5)	4.3 (39.7)	9.6 (49.3)	13.8 (56.8)	18.1 (64.6)	19.5 (67.1)	16.2 (61.2)	10.4 (50.7)	3.5 (38.3)	−2.5 (27.5)	6.7 (44.1)
Mean daily minimum °C (°F)	−9.9 (14.2)	−10.8 (12.6)	−6.1 (21.0)	−0.4 (31.3)	4.6 (40.3)	9.1 (48.4)	14.0 (57.2)	15.2 (59.4)	10.7 (51.3)	5.3 (41.5)	−0.1 (31.8)	−6.1 (21.0)	2.1 (35.8)
Record low °C (°F)	−30.6 (−23.1)	−28.5 (−19.3)	−22.0 (−7.6)	−11.0 (12.2)	−5.7 (21.7)	−2.9 (26.8)	2.0 (35.6)	4.5 (40.1)	−1.2 (29.8)	−5.2 (22.6)	−10.2 (13.6)	−25.5 (−13.9)	−30.6 (−23.1)
Average precipitation mm (inches)	44.6 (1.76)	31.5 (1.24)	34.4 (1.35)	41.4 (1.63)	61.2 (2.41)	56.0 (2.20)	109.2 (4.30)	123.5 (4.86)	124.1 (4.89)	127.0 (5.00)	100.5 (3.96)	60.1 (2.37)	915.4 (36.04)
Average snowfall cm (inches)	219 (86)	167 (66)	118 (46)	14 (5.5)	0 (0)	0 (0)	0 (0)	0 (0)	0 (0)	1 (0.4)	49 (19)	191 (75)	759 (297.9)
Average extreme snow depth cm (inches)	71 (28)	82 (32)	72 (28)	3 (1.2)	0 (0)	0 (0)	0 (0)	0 (0)	0 (0)	1 (0.4)	16 (6.3)	50 (20)	82 (32)
Average precipitation days (≥ 1.0 mm)	16.4	12.0	10.2	9.5	9.5	8.8	9.1	9.4	11.7	15.1	16.5	17.2	145.4
Average snowy days (≥ 3.0 cm)	23.0	20.1	16.7	2.3	0	0	0	0	0	0.1	5.5	20.2	87.9
Mean monthly sunshine hours	52.7	78.7	138.3	166.5	185.3	153.9	150.8	159.8	173.7	127.4	54.7	31.7	1,473.5
Source 1: JMA
Source 2: JMA

=== Demographics ===
Per Japanese census data, the population of Teshio is as shown below. The town is in a long period of sustained population loss.

Historical population
Year	Pop.	±%
1940	6,878	—
1950	9,091	+32.2%
1960	9,365	+3.0%
1970	7,831	−16.4%
1980	6,281	−19.8%
1990	5,340	−15.0%
2000	4,542	−14.9%
2010	3,779	−16.8%
2020	2,950	−21.9%

== History ==
The mouth of the Teshio River was an excellent port due to a natural breakwater formed by a sand spit that developed long into the Sarobetsu Plain, and it was blessed with abundant natural resources from the sea and mountains, so a kotan was built by the Ainu people as long as 3000 years ago and it became a key anchorage and trading point. When Matsumae Domain advanced into the area in the early Edo period, it became a trading place between the Ainu and Japanese, and later a guard post was established. During the Meiji period, an agricultural land development project was carried out to also serve as a defense for the north, and many pioneers from the Tohoku and Hokuriku regions settled here. The area also became a collection point for timber cut from the forests of the Teshio River Basin and the timber industry flourished with the establishment of branches of timber wholesalers. The population increased with the arrival of people engaged in the fishing of herring salmon, and trout, shipping companies, and various commercial and industrial businesses, and various administrative facilities such as the county office, police, and forestry office were also established, and the area flourished as one of the core cities in northern Hokkaido. The area was also the first area in Hokkaido where modern commercial whaling was carried out, and it is said that large whales such as gray whales and humpback whales were once seen in large numbers along the coast. The village of Teshio was established in 1878 and raised to town status in 1880. In the postwar period, like other towns and villages in northern Hokkaidō, depopulation has progressed due to the outflow of population to large cities following the collapse of the herring fisheries and decline of the forestry industries.

== Government ==
Teshio has a mayor-council form of government with a directly elected mayor and a unicameral town council of nine members. Teshio, as part of Rumoi sub-prefecture, contributes one member to the Hokkaidō Prefectural Assembly. In terms of national politics, the town is part of the Hokkaidō 10th district of the lower house of the Diet of Japan.

== Economy ==
The local economy of Teshio is centered on commercial fishing, dairy farming, agriculture and forestry. The town has the largest catch of shijimi clams in Hokkaidō from the Teshio Rive,

== Education ==
Teshio has one public elementary school and one public junior high school operated by the town government, and one public high school operated by the Hokkaidō Board of Education.

== Transportation ==
=== Railways ===
After the closure of the Japan National Railway Haboro Line in 1987, the town has not had any passenger rail service. The closest train station is Horonobe Station on the JR Hokkaido Sōya Main Line.

=== Highways ===
- National Route 40
- National Route 232

== Sister city relations ==
- Homer, Alaska, USA since 1984
- Tomari, Russia since 1992.

== Mascot ==
Teshio Kamen, the town's mascot

Teshio's mascot is Teshio Kamen (てしお仮面) who is a superhero basket clam. He is given a "te" (天)-shaped badge to symbolize his honor by people especially children and the elderly. He uses his index finger to send signals.
