= Kamikawa Subprefecture =

Kamikawa Subprefecture 上川総合振興局
- subprefecture
- Kamikawa-sōgō-shinkō-kyoku
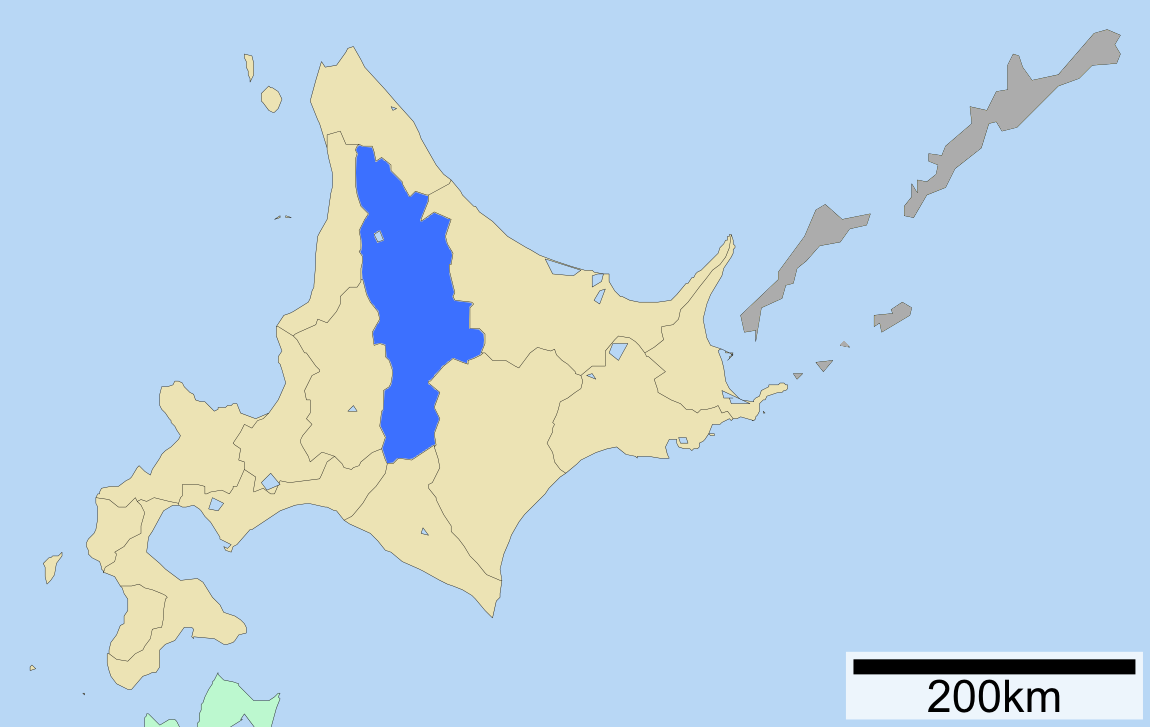
- Coordinates: 43°48′27″N 142°26′22″E
- Country: Japan
- Prefecture: Hokkaido
- Capital: Asahikawa

Area
  - Total: 9,852.17 km^{2} (3,803.94 sq mi)

Population (March 2009)
  - Total: 535,456
  - Density: 54.3490/km^{2} (140.763/sq mi)
- Website: kamikawa.pref.hokkaido.lg.jp

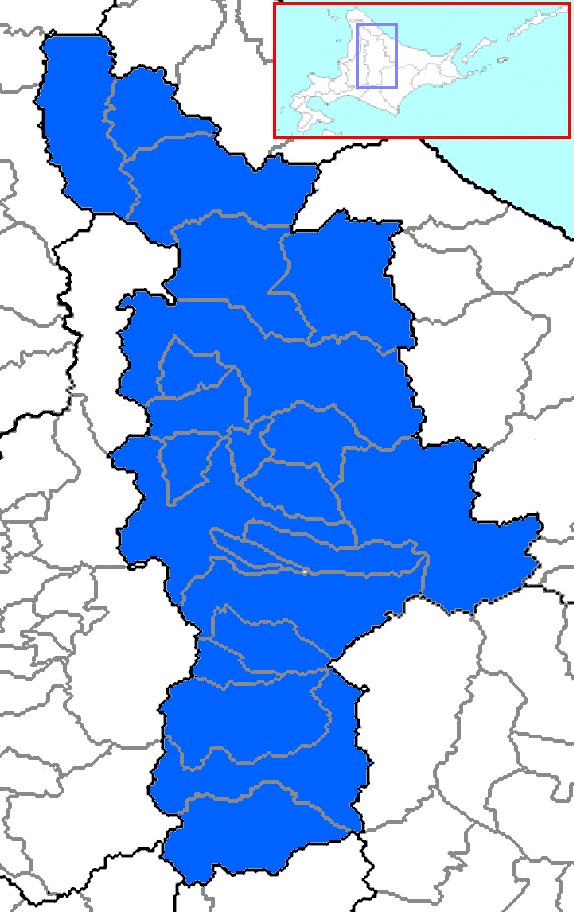
Kamikawa Subprefecture (without Horokanai)

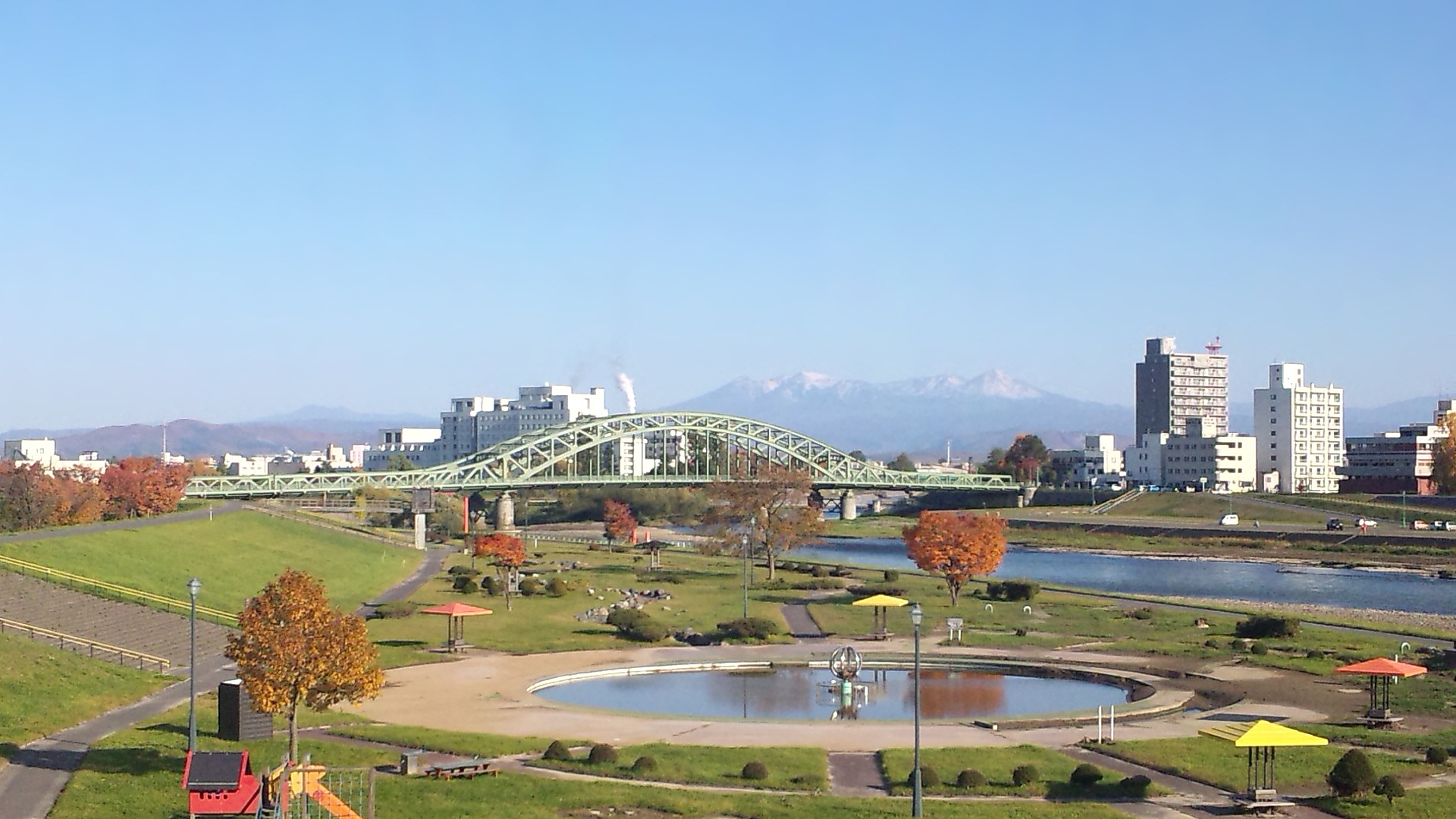
Asahikawa City

Kamikawa (上川総合振興局, Kamikawa-sōgō-shinkō-kyoku) is a subprefecture of Hokkaido Prefecture, Japan. The name is derived from Kamikawa no hitobito no Shūraku (Village of the Upstream People), a translation of the Ainu Peni Unguri Kotan. Settlement began in 1867. The sub-prefecture was established in 1897.

Asahikawa Airport stretches over the outskirts of Asahikawa City and Higashikagura in Kamikawa (Ishikari) District.

== Geography ==
=== Municipalities ===
Name		Area (km^{2})	Population	District	Type	Map
Rōmaji	Kanji	Area (km^{2})	Population	District	Type	Map
Aibetsu	愛別町	250.13	2,992	Kamikawa (Ishikari) District	Town	
Asahikawa (capital)	旭川市	747.6	333,530	no district	City	
Biei	美瑛町	677.16	10,374	Kamikawa (Ishikari) District	Town	
Bifuka	美深町	672.14	4,609	Nakagawa District	Town	
Furano	富良野市	600.97	22,715	no district	City	
Higashikagura	東神楽町	68.64	10,385	Kamikawa (Ishikari) District	Town	
Higashikawa	東川町	247.06	8,092	Kamikawa (Ishikari) District	Town	
Horokanai	幌加内町	767.03	1,571	Uryū District	Town	
Kamifurano	上富良野町	237.18	11,055	Sorachi District	Town	
Kamikawa	上川町	1,049.24	3,706	Kamikawa (Ishikari) District	Town	
Kenbuchi	剣淵町	131.2	3,293	Kamikawa (Teshio) District	Town	
Minamifurano	南富良野町	665.52	2,611	Sorachi District	Town	
Nakafurano	中富良野町	108.7	5,086	Sorachi District	Town	
Nakagawa	中川町	594.87	1,585	Nakagawa District	Town	
Nayoro	名寄市	535.23	28,373	no district	City	
Otoineppu	音威子府村	275.64	831	Nakagawa District	Village	
Pippu	比布町	87.29	3,845	Kamikawa (Ishikari) District	Town	
Shibetsu	士別市	1,119.29	19,794	no district	City	
Shimokawa	下川町	644.2	3,836	Kamikawa (Teshio) District	Town	
Shimukappu	占冠村	571.31	1,251	Yūfutsu District	Village	
Takasu	鷹栖町	139.44	6,780	Kamikawa (Ishikari) District	Town	
Tōma	当麻町	204.95	6,662	Kamikawa (Ishikari) District	Town	
Wassamu	和寒町	224.83	3,553	Kamikawa (Teshio) District	Town	
