= Nakagawa (Teshio) District, Hokkaido =

District in Hokkaido, Japan

Coordinates: 44°29′N 142°21′E

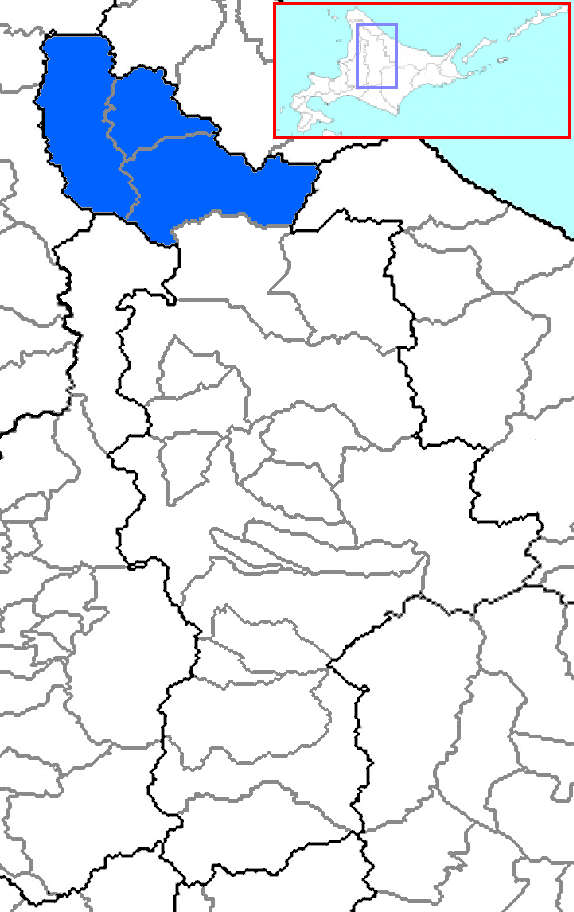
The area of Nakagawa (Teshio) District in Kamikawa Subprefecture.

Nakagawa (中川郡 (天塩国), Nakagawa-gun (Teshio no kuni)) is a district located in Kamikawa Subprefecture, Hokkaido, Japan. The Ainu origin of the district name comes from the fact that it is located in the middle reaches of the Teshio River. There is a district with the same name in Tokachi Subprefecture, see Nakagawa (Tokachi) District, Hokkaido.

As of 2004, the district has an estimated population of 9,038 and a density of 5.86 persons per km^{2}. The total area is 1,542.65 km^{2}.

== Towns and villages ==
- Bifuka
- Nakagawa
- Otoineppu
