= Toyohoro Station =

Railway station in Ebetsu, Hokkaido, Japan

Coordinates: 43.1359°N 141.6243°E

Toyohoro Station 豊幌駅
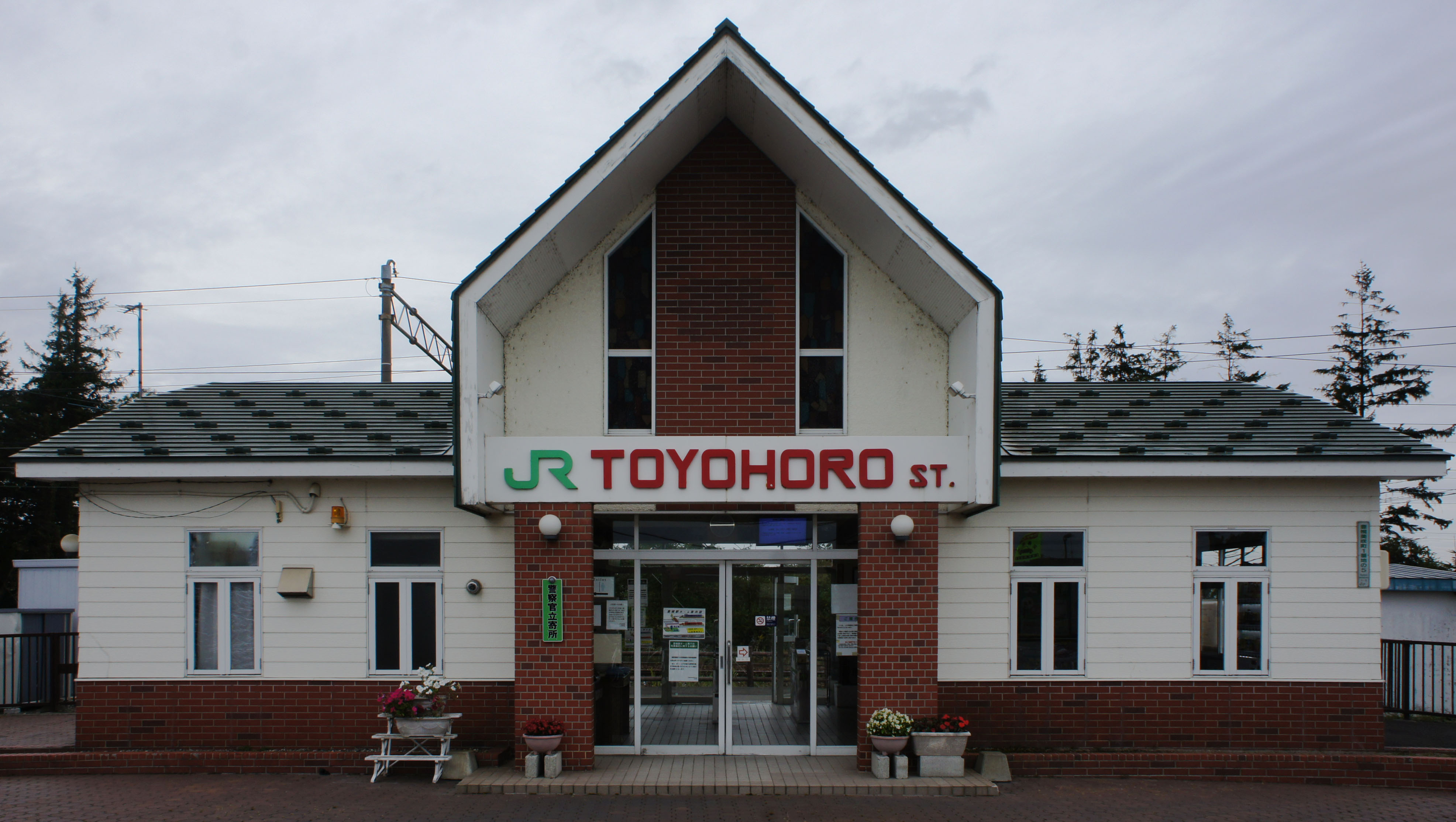
- Station building, September 2018

General information
- Location: Ebetsu, Hokkaido; Japan
- Operator: JR Hokkaido
- Line: Hakodate Main Line
- Distance: 313.5 km from Hakodate
- Platforms: 2 side platforms
- Tracks: 2

Other information
- Status: Unstaffed
- Station code: A10

History
- Opened: November 1, 1956

Passengers
- FY2002: 113 daily
Location

Toyohoro Station (豊幌駅, Toyohoro-eki) is a railway station in Ebetsu, Hokkaidō, Japan. The station is numbered A10.

== Lines ==
Toyohoro Station is served by the Hakodate Main Line.

== Station layout ==
The station consists of two ground-level opposed side platforms serving two tracks. The station has automated ticket machines and Kitaca card readers. The station is unattended.

=== Platforms ===
1	■ Hakodate Main Line	for Sapporo and Otaru
2	■ Hakodate Main Line	for Iwamizawa and Asahikawa

== Adjacent stations ==
«	Service	»
Hakodate Main Line
Limited Express Sōya: Does not stop at this station
Limited Express Okhotsk: Does not stop at this station
Ebetsu	Semi-Rapid	Horomui
Ebetsu	Local	Horomui
