= Bibai Dam =

Coordinates: 43°21′16″N 141°58′46″E

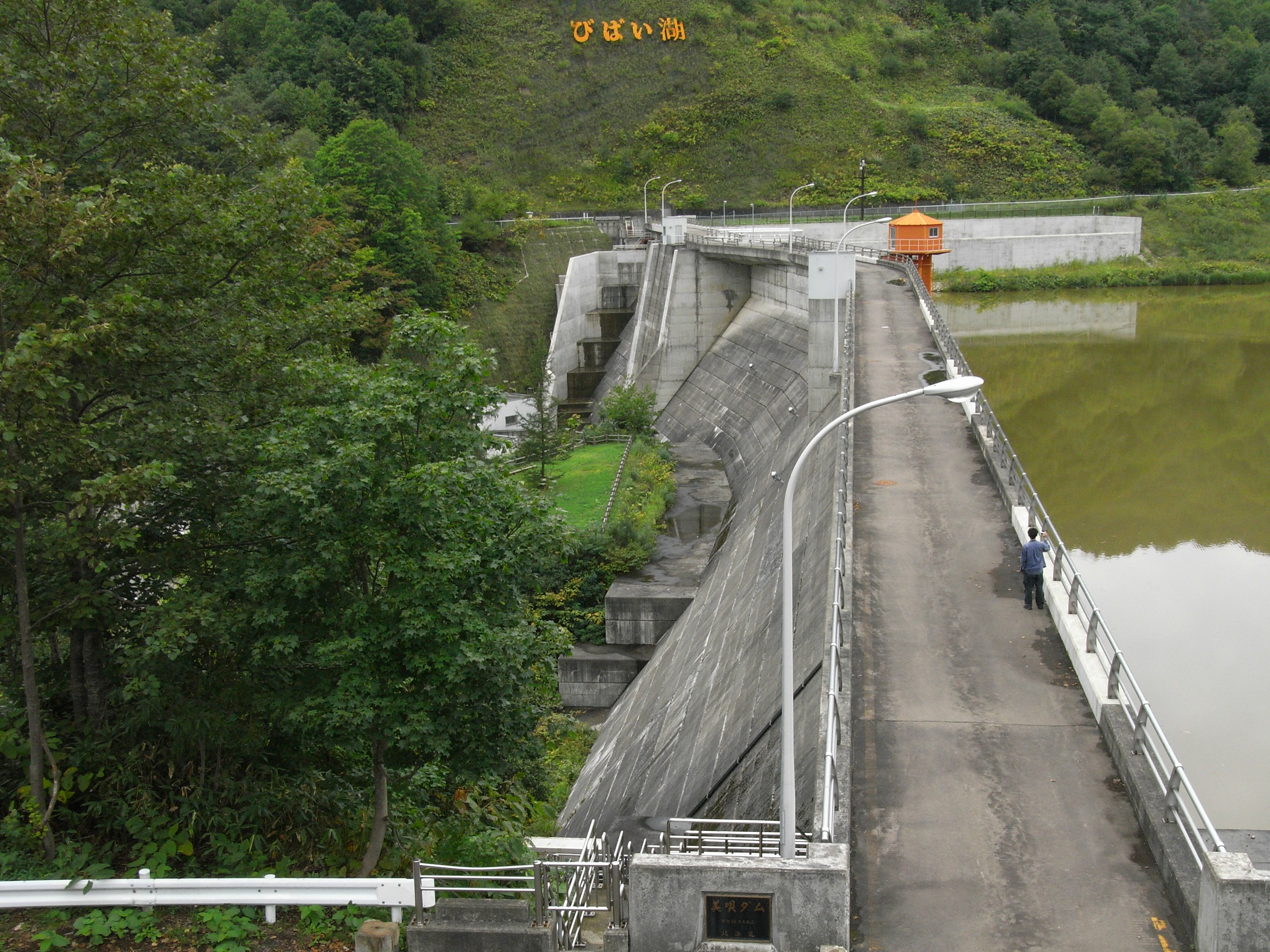
- Interactive map of Bibai Dam
- Location: Bibai, Hokkaidō, Japan
- Construction began: 1969
- Opening date: 1982

Dam and spillways
- Impounds: Bibai River
- Height: 35.5 m
- Length: 228 m

Reservoir
- Total capacity: 1,500,000 m^{3}
- Catchment area: 24.6 km^{2}
- Surface area: 15 hectares

The Bibai Dam (美唄ダム, Bibai damu) is a dam in Bibai, Hokkaidō, Japan. The Bibai Dam is constructed along the Mikawa River and is part of the Ishikari River water system.

Bibai Dam was Hokkaido's first multipurpose auxiliary dam project. It is a 35.5m tall concrete Gravity dam. The dam was named after the Bibai Lake in 1987 by public designation.

== History ==
In August 1966, a flood occurred in the city of Bibai, Hokkaido which led to the deaths of 2 and the tremendous damage to the city. This led to the small and medium rivers and lakes improvement project review. A study of the revision of the high water flow rate and flood control plan conclusion that a flood dam plan should be considered. Due to the sharp decline in coal demand, the main industry in the region, the industrial structure was forced to change and the industrial area was moved from Chashinai Station to Naie, Hokkaido in order to attract more business to the industrial park. Due to urbanization, it became necessary to secure a new water supply on an industrial scale.

Due to the increase in demand for water, the Babai River Comprehensive Development Project and Bibai Dam Construction Plan were created in order to control floods and the utilization of water. The project launched in 1969 and ran until completion in 1982.

From 2000 to 2004 the Biba Dam reconstruction project changed the dam's Crest Gate flood control method to the Overflow weir method. In 2004, the Sapporo Civil Engineering Bibai Comprehensive Dam Office was closed and management of the facility was transferred to the Iwamizawa, Hokkaido branch.

== Tourism ==
Aside from the many coal mining sites that are found along Bibai, Hokkaido to the dam, there is also ArtePiazza, the Coal Mining Memorial Forst Park. In late July, there is the Lake Bibai Festival as well as various hiking locations leading up to Mount Yubari.
