= Ōasa Station =

Railway station in Ebetsu, Hokkaido, Japan

Coordinates: 43.0723°N 141.4967°E

Ōasa Station 大麻駅
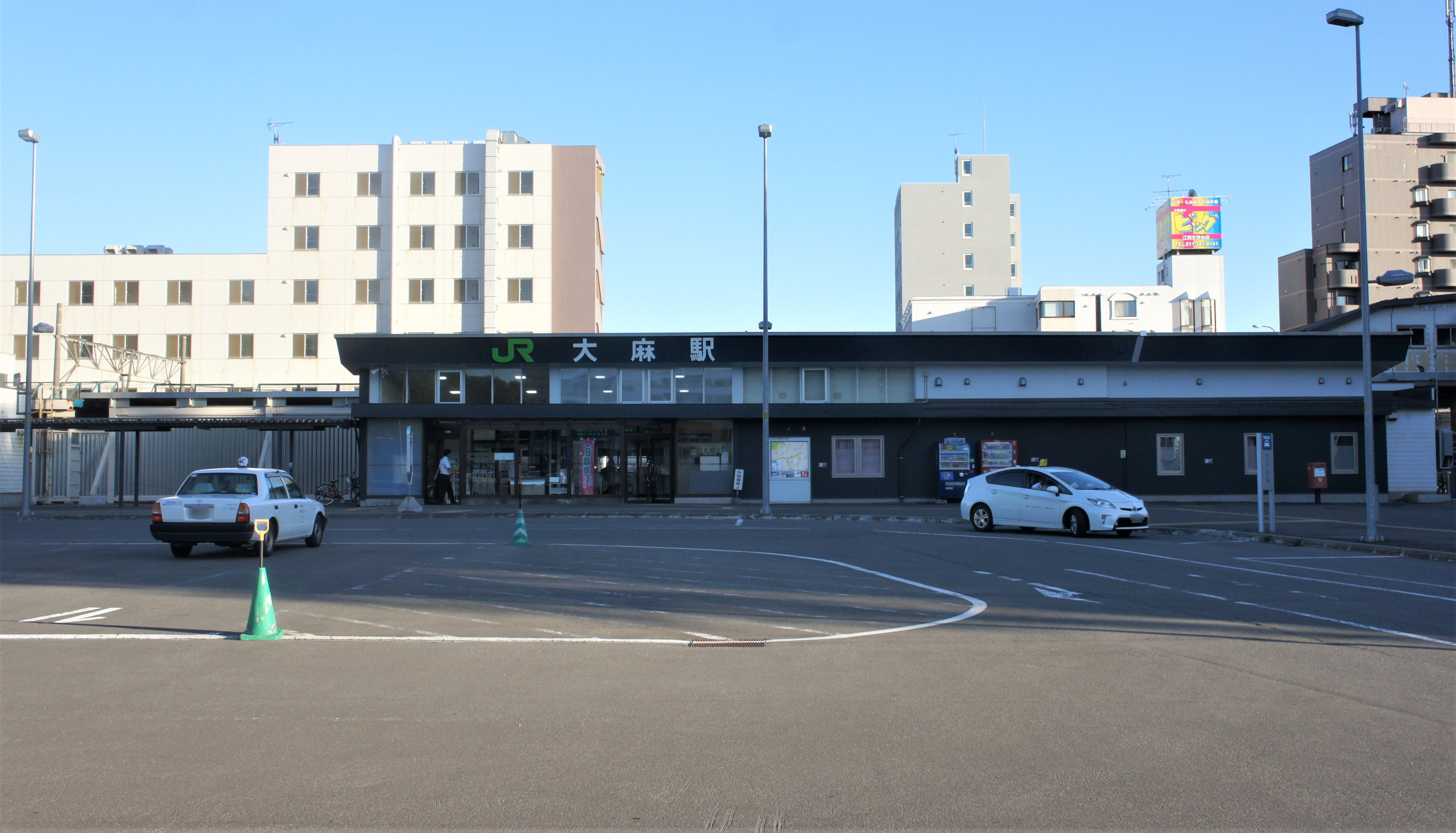
- North side of Oasa Station, September 2018

General information
- Location: Ebetsu, Hokkaido; Japan
- Operator: JR Hokkaido
- Line: Hakodate Main Line
- Distance: 300.8 km from Hakodate
- Platforms: 2 side platforms
- Tracks: 2

Other information
- Status: Staffed
- Station code: A06

History
- Opened: 15 December 1966

Passengers
- FY2014: 7,389 daily

Services
Preceding station	JR Hokkaido	Following station
Shinrin-Kōen towards Hakodate	Hakodate Main Line Local	Nopporo towards Asahikawa
Location

Ōasa Station (大麻駅, Ōasa-eki) is a railway station in Ebetsu, Hokkaidō, Japan. The station is numbered A06.

== Lines ==
Oasa Station is served by Hakodate Main Line.

== Station layout ==
The station consists of two ground-level opposed side platforms connected by a footbridge, serving two tracks. The station has automated ticket machines, automated turnstiles which accept Kitaca, and a "Midori no Madoguchi" staffed ticket office.

=== Platforms ===
1	■ Hakodate Main Line	for Sapporo and Otaru
2	■ Hakodate Main Line	for Ebetsu and Iwamizawa

== Adjacent stations ==
«	Service	»
Hakodate Main Line
Limited Express Sōya: Does not stop at this station
Limited Express Okhotsk: Does not stop at this station
Shiroishi	Semi-Rapid	Nopporo
Shinrin-Kōen	Local	Nopporo
