= Horomui Station =

Railway station in Iwamizawa, Hokkaido, Japan

Coordinates: 43.1516°N 141.6560°E

Horomui Station 幌向駅
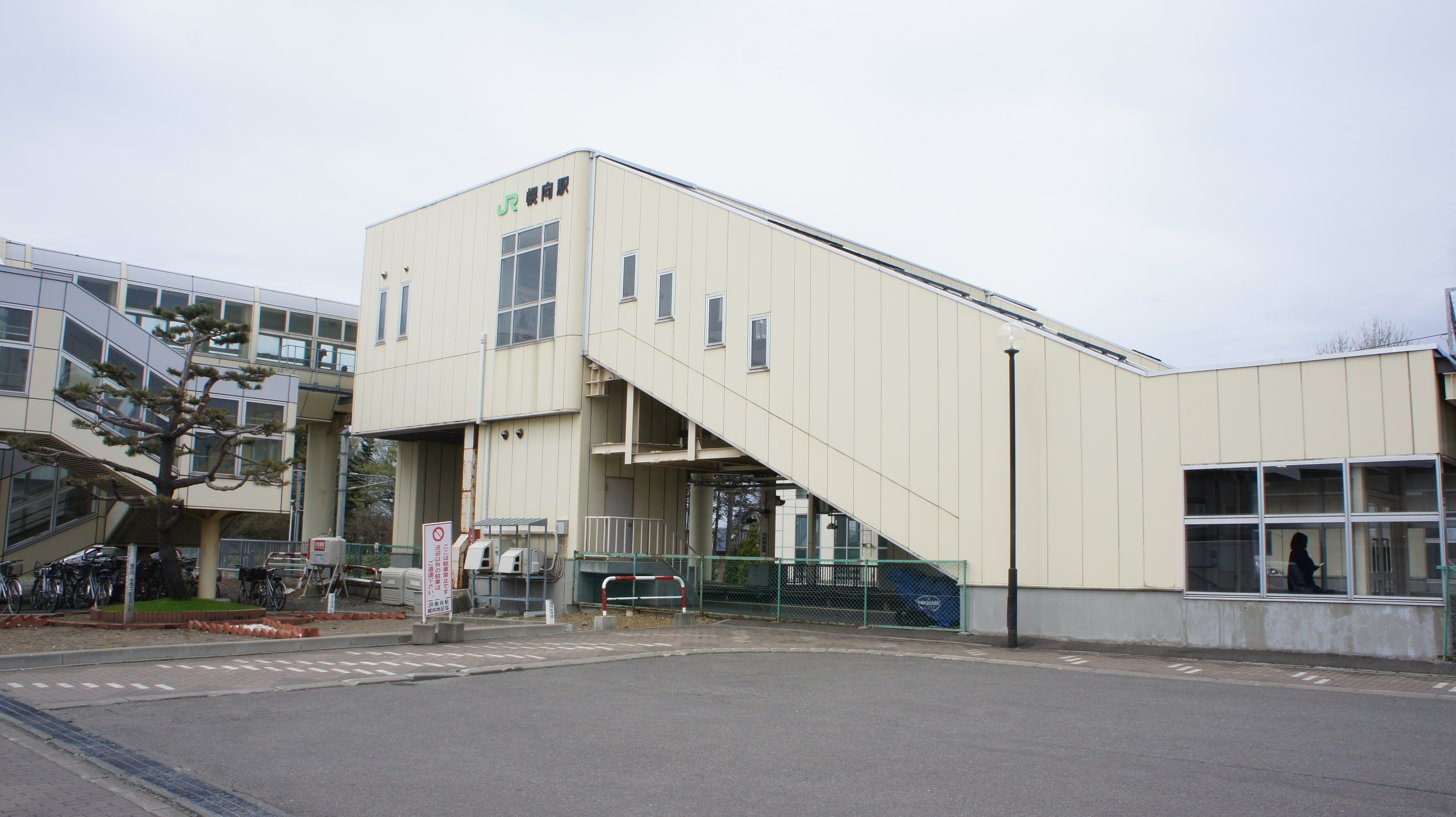
- The station building in May 2017

General information
- Location: Iwamizawa, Hokkaido; Japan
- Operator: JR Hokkaido
- Line: Hakodate Main Line
- Distance: 316.7 km from Hakodate
- Platforms: 1 side + 1 island platform
- Tracks: 3

Other information
- Status: Staffed
- Station code: A11

History
- Opened: November 13, 1882

Passengers
- FY2014: 1,299 daily
Location
- Location within Japan

Horomui Station (幌向駅, Horomui-eki) is a railway station on the Hakodate Main Line in Iwamizawa, Hokkaido, Japan, operated by Hokkaido Railway Company (JR Hokkaido). The station is numbered A11.

== Lines ==
Horomui Station is served by the Hakodate Main Line.

== Station layout ==
The station consists of one side platform and one island platform serving three tracks, with the station situated above the tracks. The station has automated ticket machines, automated turnstiles which accept Kitaca, and a "Midori no Madoguchi" staffed ticket office.

=== Platforms ===
| 1 | ■ Hakodate Main Line | for Sapporo and Otaru |
| 2 | ■ Hakodate Main Line | for Sapporo and Otaru for Iwamizawa and Asahikawa |
| 3 | ■ Hakodate Main Line | for Iwamizawa and Asahikawa |

== Adjacent stations ==
| « | Service | » |
Hakodate Main Line
Limited Express Sōya: Does not stop at this station
Limited Express Okhotsk: Does not stop at this station
| Toyohoro | Semi-rapid | Kami-Horomui |
| Toyohoro | Local | Kami-Horomui |

== See also ==
- List of railway stations in Japan
