= Takasago Station =

Takasago Station (高砂駅) is the name of multiple train stations in Japan:

- Takasago Station (Hokkaidō)
- Takasago Station (Hyōgo)
- Keisei-Takasago Station
