= Nopporo Station =

Railway station in Ebetsu, Hokkaido, Japan

Coordinates: 43°5′33.59″N 141°31′46.48″E

Nopporo Station 野幌駅
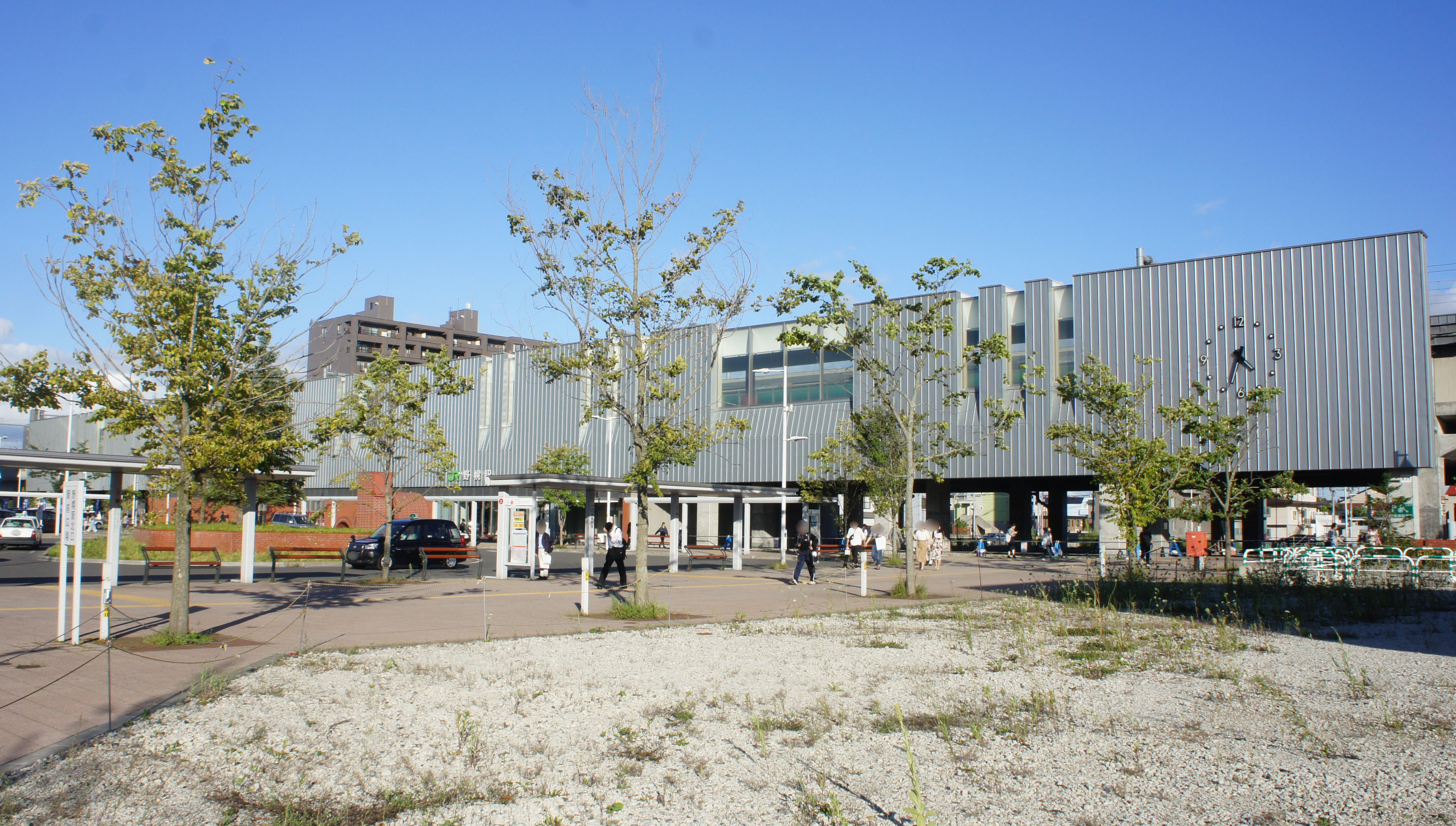
- Nopporo Station

General information
- Location: Ebetsu, Hokkaido; Japan
- Operator: JR Hokkaido
- Line: Hakodate Main Line
- Distance: 304.2 km from Hakodate
- Platforms: 2 side platforms
- Tracks: 2

Other information
- Status: Staffed
- Station code: A07

History
- Opened: November 3, 1889

Passengers
- FY2014: 6,627 daily
Location

Nopporo Station (野幌駅, Nopporo-eki) is a railway station in Ebetsu, Hokkaidō, Japan. The station is numbered A07.

== Lines ==
Nopporo Station is served by Hakodate Main Line.

== Station layout ==
The station consists of elevated two side platforms serving two tracks. The station has automated ticket machines, automated turnstiles which accept Kitaca, and a "Midori no Madoguchi" staffed ticket office.

=== Platforms ===
1	■ Hakodate Main Line	for Sapporo and Otaru
2	■ Hakodate Main Line	for Ebetsu and Iwamizawa

== Adjacent stations ==
«	Service	»
Hakodate Main Line
Limited Express Sōya: Does not stop at this station
Limited Express Okhotsk: Does not stop at this station
Ōasa	Semi-Rapid	Ebetsu
Ōasa	Local	Takasago
