= Hokkaido College, Senshu University =

Coordinates: 43°17′27.4″N 141°51′42.2″E

Hokkaido College, Senshu University (専修大学北海道短期大学, Senshū daigaku hokkaidō tanki daigaku) was a private junior college in Bibai, Hokkaido, Japan, established in 1968. It was closed in 2017.
