= Sorachi =

Sorachi may refer: to one of two places on

- The Sorachi Subprefecture on the island of Hokkaidō, Japan
- Sorachi District, Hokkaido on the island of Hokkaidō, Japan, which is divided between the Sorachi Subprefecture and the Kamikawa Subprefecture
- Hideaki Sorachi, the author of the Gintama manga series
- The 16594 Sorachi main-belt asteroid
- Sorachi Ace hops for flavouring beer
