= Kurisawa, Hokkaido =

Dissolved municipality in Hokkaido, Japan

Kurisawa 生田原町 いくたはらちょう
- Town
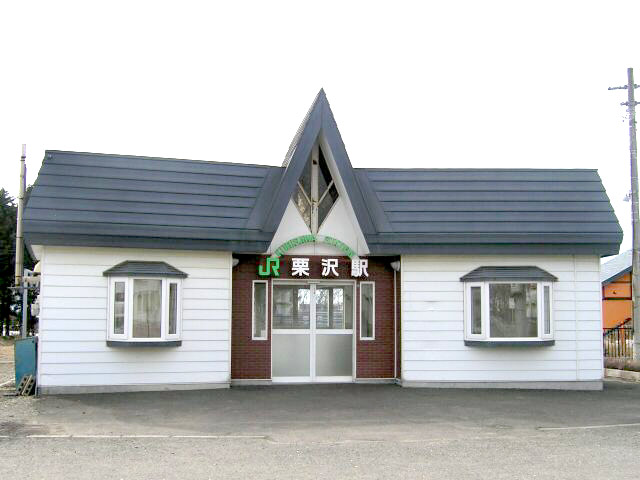
- Kurisawa Station, Muroran Main Line

- Flag Seal
- Interactive map of Kurisawa
- Country: Japan
- Region: Hokkaido
- Prefecture: Hokkaido
- Subprefecture: Sorachi
- District: Sorachi

Area
  - Total: 179.87 km^{2} (69.45 sq mi)

Population (2004)
  - Total: 7,009
  - Density: 38.97/km^{2} (100.9/sq mi)

Kurisawa (栗沢町, Kurisawa-chō) was a town located in Sorachi District, Sorachi Subprefecture, Hokkaido, Japan.

As of 2004, the town had an estimated population of 7,009 and a density of 38.97 persons per km^{2}. The total area was 179.87 km^{2}.

On March 27, 2006, Kurisawa, along with the village of Kita (also from Sorachi District) was merged into the expanded city of Iwamizawa.

== Sister city ==
- (United States) Canby, Oregon (from 1987 to present)
