= Takasago Station (Hokkaido) =

Railway station in Ebetsu, Hokkaido, Japan

Coordinates: 43°06′00″N 141°32′26″E

Takasago Station 高砂駅
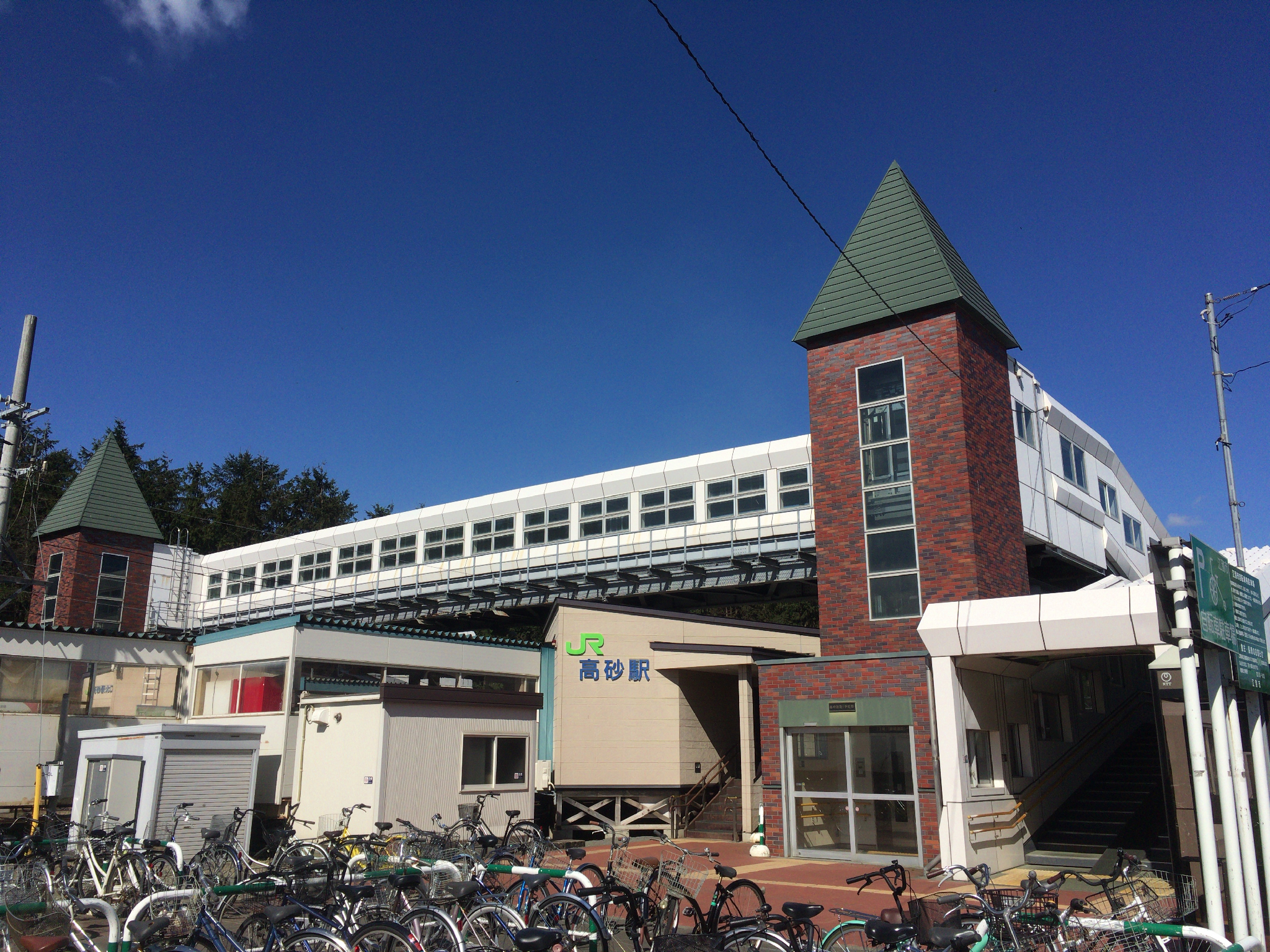
- The station building in September 2018

General information
- Location: Ebetsu, Hokkaido; Japan
- Operator: JR Hokkaido
- Line: ■ Hakodate Main Line
- Distance: 305.5 km from Hakodate
- Platforms: 2 side platforms
- Tracks: 2

Other information
- Status: Staffed
- Station code: A08

History
- Opened: November 1, 1986

Passengers
- FY2014: 2,833 daily
Location
- Location within Japan

Takasago Station (高砂駅, Takasago-eki) is a railway station on the Hakodate Main Line in Ebetsu, Hokkaidō, Japan, operated by Hokkaido Railway Company (JR Hokkaido). The station is numbered A08.

== Lines ==
Takasago Station is served by the Hakodate Main Line.

== Station layout ==
The station consists of two opposed side platforms serving two tracks. The station has automated ticket machines, automated turnstiles which accept Kitaca, and a "Midori no Madoguchi" staffed ticket office.

=== Platforms ===
1	■ Hakodate Main Line	for Sapporo and Otaru
2	■ Hakodate Main Line	for Ebetsu and Iwamizawa

== Adjacent stations ==
«	Service	»
Hakodate Main Line
Limited Express Sōya: Does not stop at this station
Limited Express Okhotsk: Does not stop at this station
Semi-Rapid: Does not stop at this station
Nopporo	Local	Ebetsu

== See also ==
- List of railway stations in Japan
