= Kōshunai Station =

Railway station in Bibai, Hokkaido, Japan

Kōshunai Station 光珠内駅
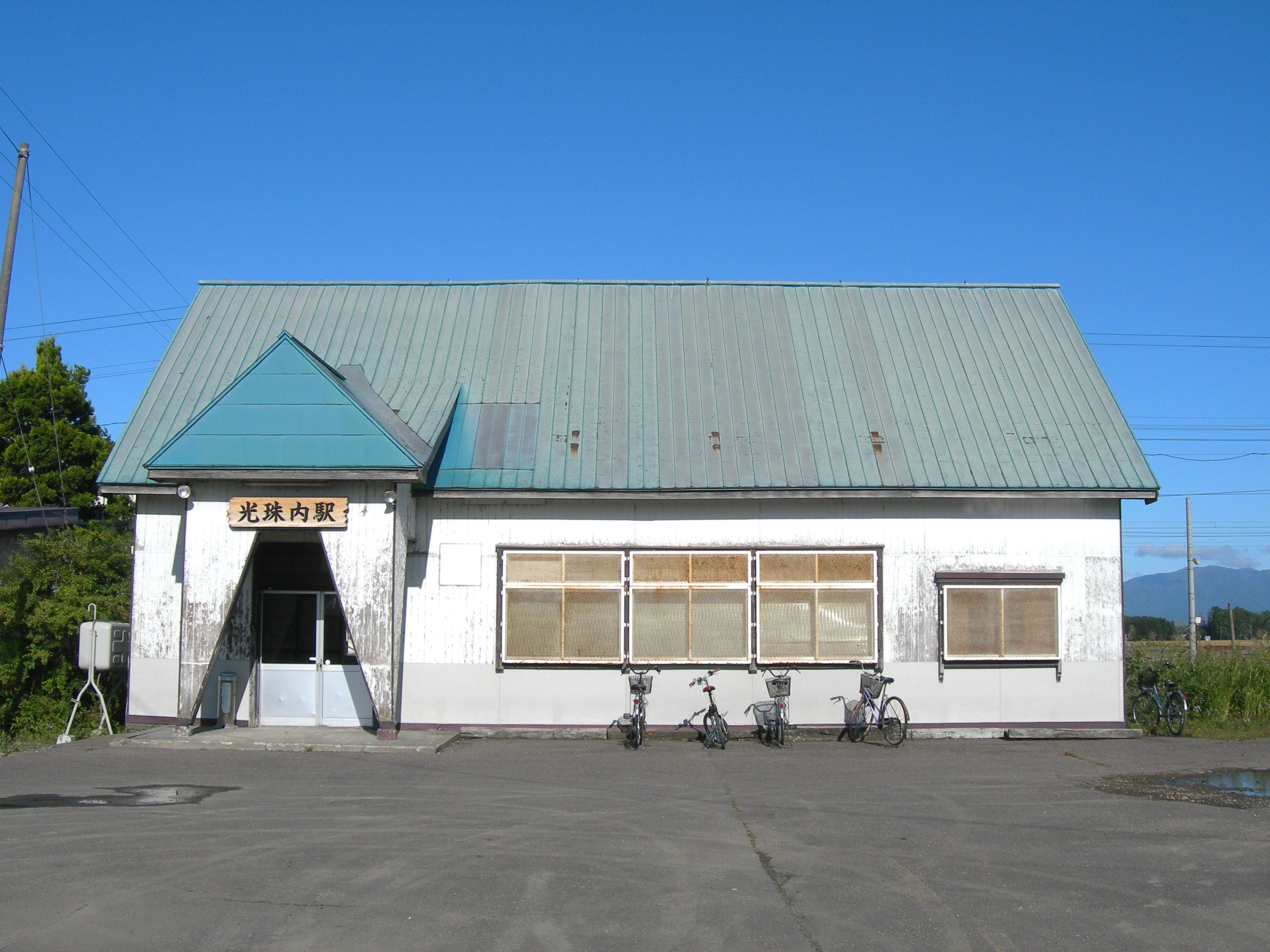

General information
- Location: Bibai, Hokkaidō; Japan
- Coordinates: 43.2925°N 141.8445°E
- Operator: JR Hokkaido
- Line: Hakodate Main Line

Other information
- Station code: A15
Location

Kōshunai Station (光珠内駅, Kōshunai-eki) is a railway station in Bibai, Hokkaidō, Japan.

== Lines ==
- Hokkaido Railway Company
  - Hakodate Main Line Station A15

== Adjacent station ==
«	Service	»
Hakodate Main Line
Limited Express Sōya: Does not stop at this station
Limited Express Okhotsk: Does not stop at this station
Minenobu	Sectional Rapid	Bibai
Minenobu	Local	Bibai
