= Ebetsu =

Ebetsu 江別市
- City
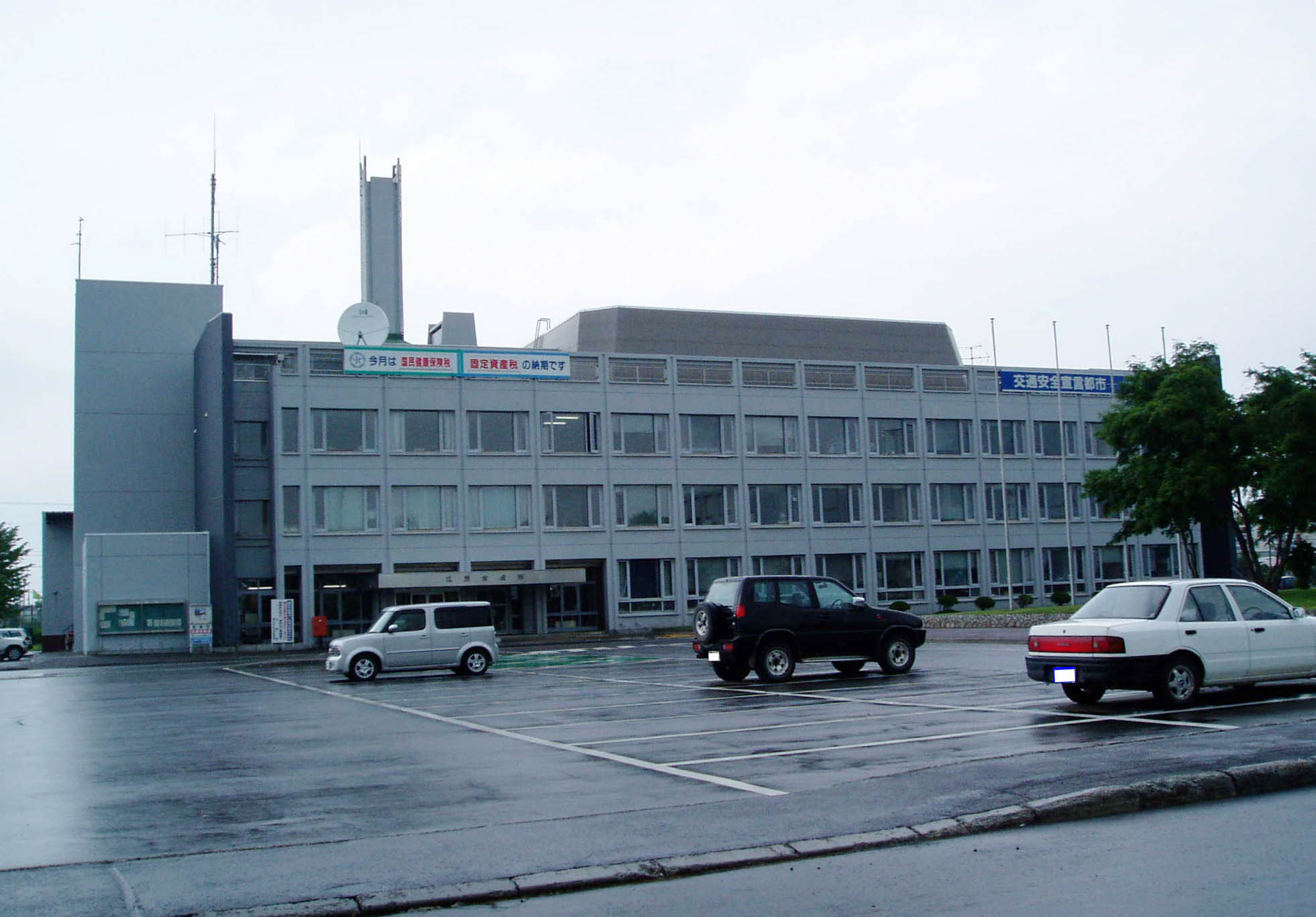
- Ebetsu City Hall

- Flag Seal

- Location of Ebetsu in Hokkaido (Ishikari Subprefecture)

- Coordinates: 43°6′N 141°32′E
- Country: Japan
- Region: Hokkaido
- Prefecture: Hokkaido (Ishikari Subprefecture)

Government
  - Mayor: Yoshihito Gotō

Area
  - Total: 187.38 km^{2} (72.35 sq mi)

Population (July 31, 2023)
  - Total: 118,764
  - Density: 633.81/km^{2} (1,641.6/sq mi)
- Time zone: UTC+9 (Japan Standard Time)
- Phone number: 011-382-4141
- Address: 6 Takasagochō, Ebetsu-shi, Hokkaidō 067-8674
- Climate: Dfb
- Website: www.city.ebetsu.hokkaido.jp
- Symbols
- Flower: Chrysanthemum
- Tree: Japanese Rowan

Ebetsu (江別市, Ebetsu-shi; Japanese pronunciation: [é̞.bè̞.t͡sɨ̀, è̞.bé̞.t͡sɨ̥.ɕì]) is a city in Ishikari Subprefecture, Hokkaido, Japan.

== History ==
Ebetsu was settled originally by Japanese people in 1871, who came from the Miyagi Prefecture on Honshu. In 1878, tondenhei began moving into the area. When the Meiji Government, in 1878, designated Hokkaido as part of Japan, settlers began to flood the area. Ebetsu earned township status in 1916 and city status in 1954. During the 1960s and 1970s, a burgeoning population in Sapporo caused the population in Ebetsu to concurrently boom. In 1991, the city reached 100,000 people.

The name Ebetsu is derived from the Ainu name of the Chitose River which flows into the Ishikari River in the city. According to John Batchelor in his "An Ainu-English Dictionary" (chapter 1, section V: Place Names Considered) the Ainu language name was E-pet or "humour river" based on its murky colour.

== Demographics ==
Per Japanese census data, the population of Ebetsu grew substantially in the late 20th century but has plateaued in the 21st.

Historical population
Year	Pop.	±%
1970	63,762	—
1980	86,349	+35.4%
1990	97,201	+12.6%
2000	123,877	+27.4%
2010	123,722	−0.1%
2020	121,056	−2.2%

As of July 31, 2023, the city had an estimated population of 118,764, with 56,325 households, and a population density of 634 persons per km². The total area is 187.38 km².

== Geography and transportation ==
The majority of commercial Ebetsu is on or immediately surrounding Route 12 (runs north-south through town). The northern limits of town are delineated by the Ishikari River, the southern sub-city of Oasa by Ebetsu's boundary with Sapporo. It bounds the city limits of Kitahiroshima, Iwamizawa, Nanporo, Tōbetsu, and Shinshinotsu.

Ebetsu is about 16 km from downtown Sapporo. It is accessed by the Dō-Ō Expressway, by Chūō or JR Hokkaidō bus lines, or by the Asahikawa-Hakodate train line that approximately follows Route 12 through town (at Ōasa, Nopporo, Takasago, and Ebetsu stations), joining with the northwest-southeast running main line that extends from Chitose Airport to Sapporo Station in Shinsapporo (New Sapporo, a district of larger metropolitan Sapporo).

The extensive Nopporo Forest State Park (the world's largest park of virgin forest on level ground) is behind Ebetsu's Rakunō Gakuen University (the first university in Ebetsu, founded in 1949), encompassing 2015 hectares of preserved forest. Because of Ebetsu's location approximately in the middle of the Ishikari Plain (Sapporo city is the southwestern extent), it is known for having wind year-round.

== Climate ==
The 10-year average temperature for Ebetsu is 7.1 degrees Celsius. The hottest and coldest temperatures, respectively, ever recorded are 34.7 °C (94.5 °F) and −27.7 °C (−17.9 °F).

Climate data for Ebetsu (elevation 8 m, 2000–2020 normals, extremes 2000–present)
Month	Jan	Feb	Mar	Apr	May	Jun	Jul	Aug	Sep	Oct	Nov	Dec	Year
Record high °C (°F)	6.9 (44.4)	10.0 (50.0)	15.1 (59.2)	25.7 (78.3)	31.9 (89.4)	32.0 (89.6)	35.6 (96.1)	34.7 (94.5)	31.9 (89.4)	26.1 (79.0)	19.7 (67.5)	14.9 (58.8)	35.6 (96.1)
Mean daily maximum °C (°F)	−2.2 (28.0)	−1.1 (30.0)	3.0 (37.4)	10.6 (51.1)	16.9 (62.4)	20.9 (69.6)	24.3 (75.7)	25.8 (78.4)	22.5 (72.5)	15.7 (60.3)	7.8 (46.0)	0.3 (32.5)	12.1 (53.8)
Daily mean °C (°F)	−6.4 (20.5)	−5.5 (22.1)	−0.8 (30.6)	5.6 (42.1)	11.4 (52.5)	15.7 (60.3)	19.5 (67.1)	21.0 (69.8)	17.1 (62.8)	10.3 (50.5)	3.5 (38.3)	−3.5 (25.7)	7.3 (45.1)
Mean daily minimum °C (°F)	−12.2 (10.0)	−11.5 (11.3)	−5.6 (21.9)	0.6 (33.1)	6.4 (43.5)	11.7 (53.1)	16.0 (60.8)	17.1 (62.8)	11.9 (53.4)	4.8 (40.6)	−0.8 (30.6)	−8.2 (17.2)	2.6 (36.7)
Record low °C (°F)	−26.6 (−15.9)	−25.8 (−14.4)	−21.2 (−6.2)	−9.8 (14.4)	−3.6 (25.5)	2.6 (36.7)	8.0 (46.4)	7.5 (45.5)	1.5 (34.7)	−4.6 (23.7)	−14.8 (5.4)	−24.2 (−11.6)	−26.6 (−15.9)
Average precipitation mm (inches)	67.1 (2.64)	47.9 (1.89)	39.1 (1.54)	42.4 (1.67)	56.1 (2.21)	83.1 (3.27)	102.8 (4.05)	144.9 (5.70)	123.2 (4.85)	94.1 (3.70)	88.3 (3.48)	73.0 (2.87)	965.0 (37.99)
Average precipitation days (≥ 1.0 mm)	16.2	13.9	10.3	8.6	9.0	8.7	9.3	10.8	10.2	12.8	14.8	15.0	138.1
Mean monthly sunshine hours	82.6	95.1	149.4	176.9	198.0	171.3	161.0	159.5	165.1	144.5	98.4	74.2	1,676.5
Source: Japan Meteorological Agency (2000–2020 normals, extremes 2000–present)

== Sister cities ==
=== Sister city ===
- Gresham, Oregon, United States (since 1977)

=== Friendship city ===
- Tosa, Kōchi, Japan (since 1978)

== Education ==
=== Universities ===
- Hokkaido Information University
- Hokushō University
- Rakunō Gakuen University
- Sapporo Gakuin University

=== High schools ===
==== Public ====
- Hokkaido Ebetsu High School
- Hokkaido Nopporo High School
- Hokkaido Ooasa High School

==== Private ====
- Ritsumeikan keisho High School
- Towanomori San-ai High School

== Mascot ==
Ebechun, the city's mascot

Ebetsu's mascot is Ebechun (えべチュン). He is a yellow flightless bird that resembles a young rooster who loves to be petted. His head is unusually square. Because of this, he is nicknamed Renga tori (レンガ鳥), literally meaning "brick bird". He may look sad because of his tears (which is his charm point), but he is actually happy as they are tears of joy shed whenever something wonderful happens (e.g. farmers working hard, witnessing children, falling leaves, etc.). He is known for carrying a grain ear. He likes locally grown wheat. When he was first revealed back in 2011, he was genderless. He was originally an unofficial mascot until he was chosen by the local tourism association to represent the city.
