= Bibai Station =

Railway station in Bibai, Hokkaido, Japan

Bibai Station 美唄駅
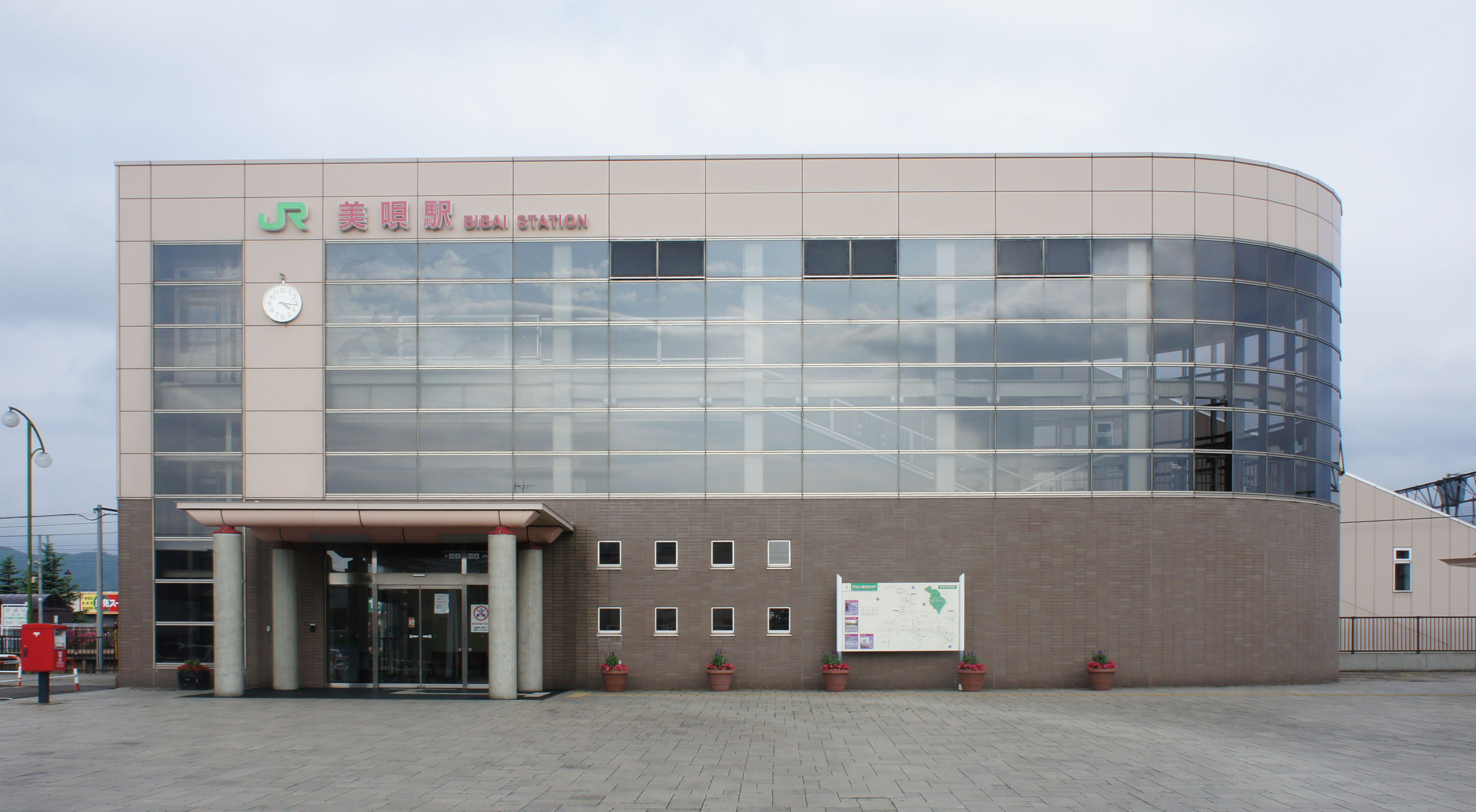
- Bibai Station in 2017

General information
- Location: Bibai; Hokkaidō Prefecture; Japan
- Coordinates: 43.3300°N 141.8620°E
- Operator: JR Hokkaido
- Line: Hakodate Main Line
- Platforms: 2 side platforms
- Tracks: 2

Construction
- Structure type: At grade

Other information
- Station code: A16

History
- Opened: 5 July 1891; 135 years ago

Services
Preceding station	JR Hokkaido	Following station
Kōshunai towards Hakodate	Hakodate Main Line Local	Chashinai towards Asahikawa
Kōshunai towards Hakodate	Hakodate Main Line Rapid	Chashinai towards Asahikawa
Limited Express
Iwamizawa towards Sapporo	Okhotsk	Sunagawa towards Abashiri
Iwamizawa towards Sapporo	Lilac	Sunagawa towards Asahikawa
Iwamizawa towards Sapporo	Kamui	Sunagawa towards Asahikawa
Sōya does not stop here
Location
- Location within Hokkaido Location within Japan

Bibai Station (美唄駅, Bibai-eki) is a railway station in Bibai, Hokkaidō, Japan, operated by Hokkaido Railway Company. The station is served by the Hakodate Main Line and is assigned station number A16.

== History ==
The station opened on 5 July 1891 by Hokkaido Colliery and Railway Company. The station was relocated due to flooding on 1 September 1901.
