= Hokkaido Information University =

University in Ebetsu, Japan

Coordinates: 43°4′40.1″N 141°32′13.8″E

- 北海道情報大学
- Type: Private
- Established: 1968
- Location: Ebetsu, Hokkaidō, Japan
- Website: Official website

Hokkaido Information University (北海道情報大学, Hokkaidō Jōhō Daigaku) is a private university in Ebetsu, Ishikari Subprefecture, Hokkaidō, Japan.

It was initially established in April 1968 with the name Hokkaido Electronics Computer School. Since 1989, Hokkaido Information University became the officially adopted name.

Currently it holds international exchange agreements with Nanjing University, Shenyang Normal University in China; University of California, Santa Cruz in USA; and Rajamangala University of Technology in Thailand.
