= Hokusho University =

Japanese private university

Coordinates: 43°3′52.5″N 141°29′30.5″E

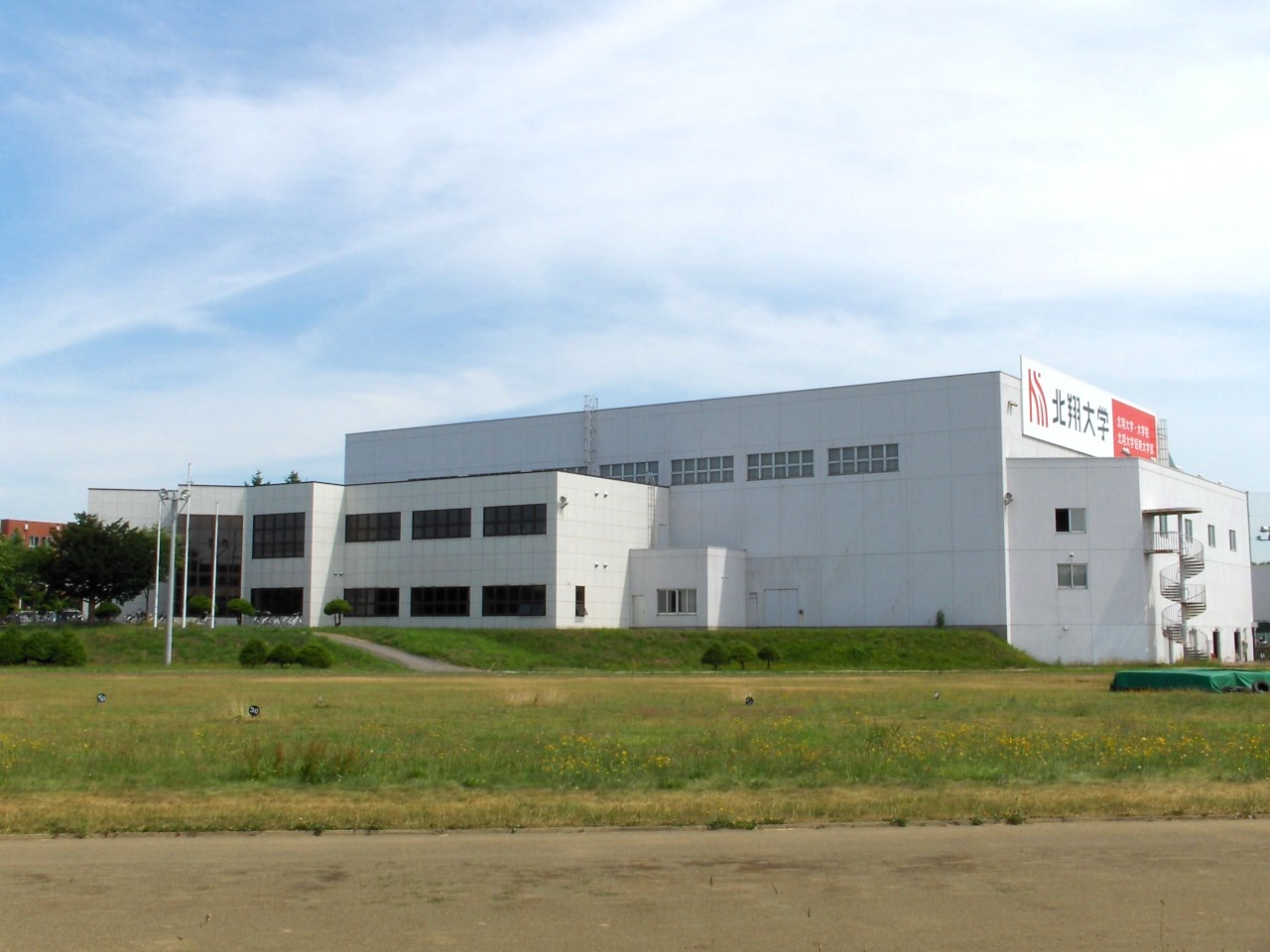
Hokusho University

Hokusho University (北翔大学, Hokushō daigaku) is a Japanese private university in Ebetsu, Hokkaido, Japan. The predecessor of the school was founded in 1939 under the name Hokkaido Women's College. It was chartered as a junior women's college in 1963. It became a four-year college in 1997. The present name was adopted in 2007.

== Overview ==
In 1939 the Hokkai Dressmaker Women's School (北海ドレスメーカー女学園), which formed the foundation of the university, was established. In 1963, the Hokkaido Women's Junior University (北海道女子短期大学) was established, and in 1966, it moved to Ebetsu, Hokkaido. In 1997, it became Hokkaido Women's University (北海道女子大学), and in 2000, it was renamed Hokkaido Asai Gakuen University (北海道浅井学園大学). Finally, in 2006, it was renamed Hokusho University.
