= Kurioka Station =

Railway station in Iwamizawa, Hokkaido, Japan

Coordinates: 43.0852°N 141.7444°E

Kurioka Station 栗丘駅
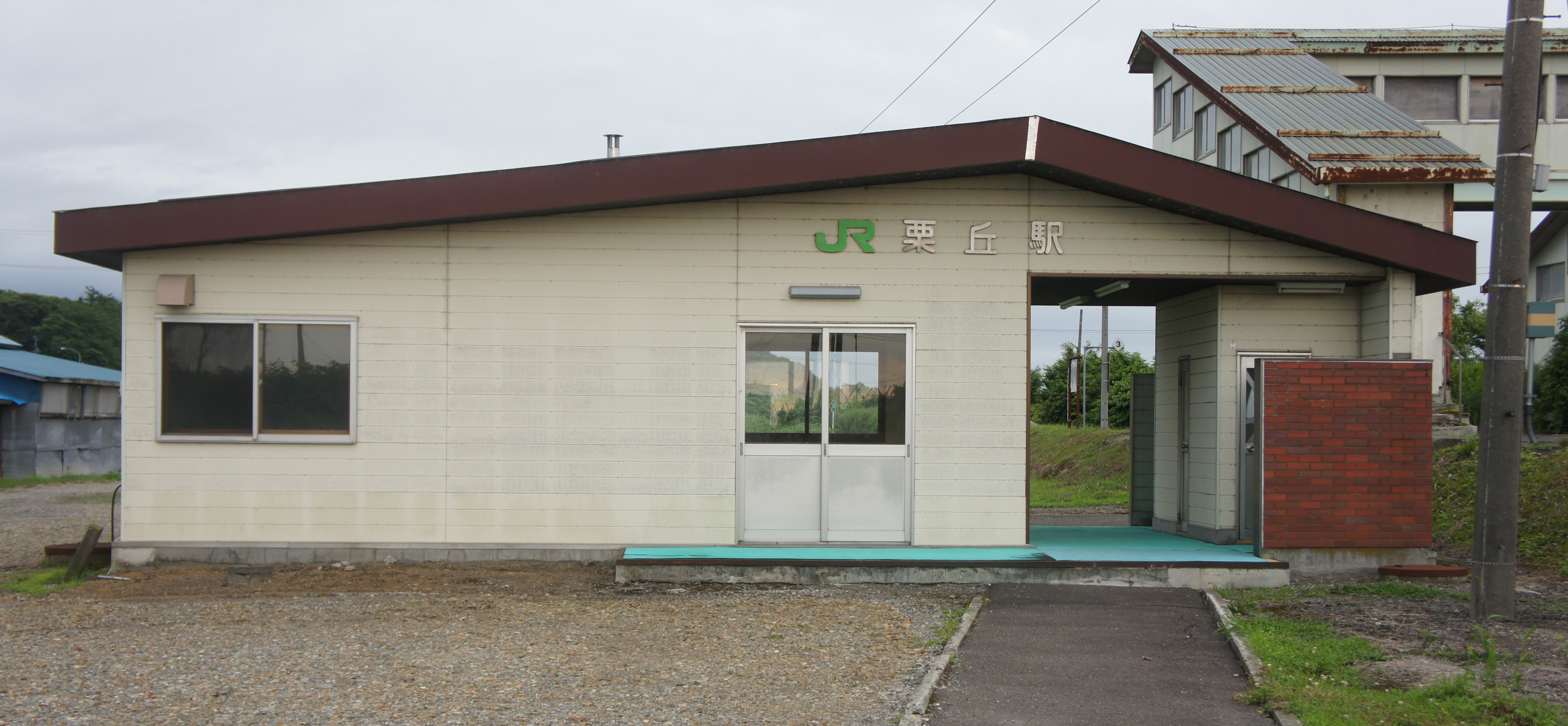
- Station building, July 2017

General information
- Location: Iwamizawa, Hokkaido; Japan
- Operator: JR Hokkaido
- Line: ■ Muroran Main Line
- Distance: 195.7 km from Oshamambe
- Platforms: 1 side platform
- Tracks: 1

Other information
- Status: Unstaffed

History
- Opened: September 25, 1943
Location

Kurioka Station (栗丘駅, Kurioka-eki) is a train station in Iwamizawa, Hokkaidō, Japan.

== Lines ==
Kurioka Station is served by the Muroran Main Line.

== Station layout ==
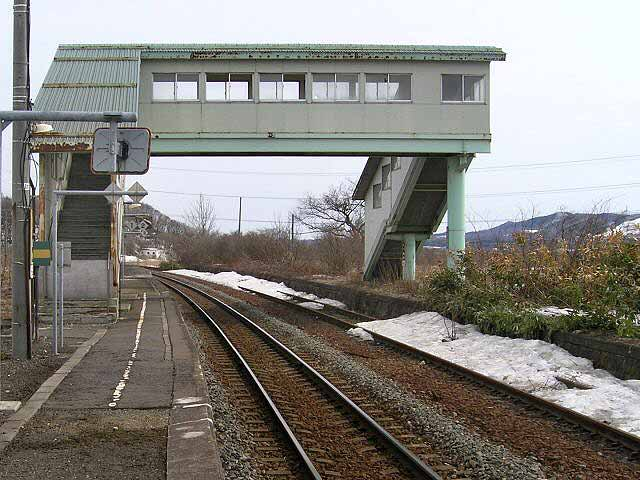
A platform and a footbridge, April 2005

The station has a ground-level side platform serving one track. Kitaca is not available. The station is unattended.

== Adjacent stations ==
«	Service	»
Muroran Main Line
Kuriyama	-	Kurisawa
