= Rakuno Gakuen University =

Private university in Japan

Coordinates: 43°4′24.4″N 141°30′46.7″E

- 酪農学園大学
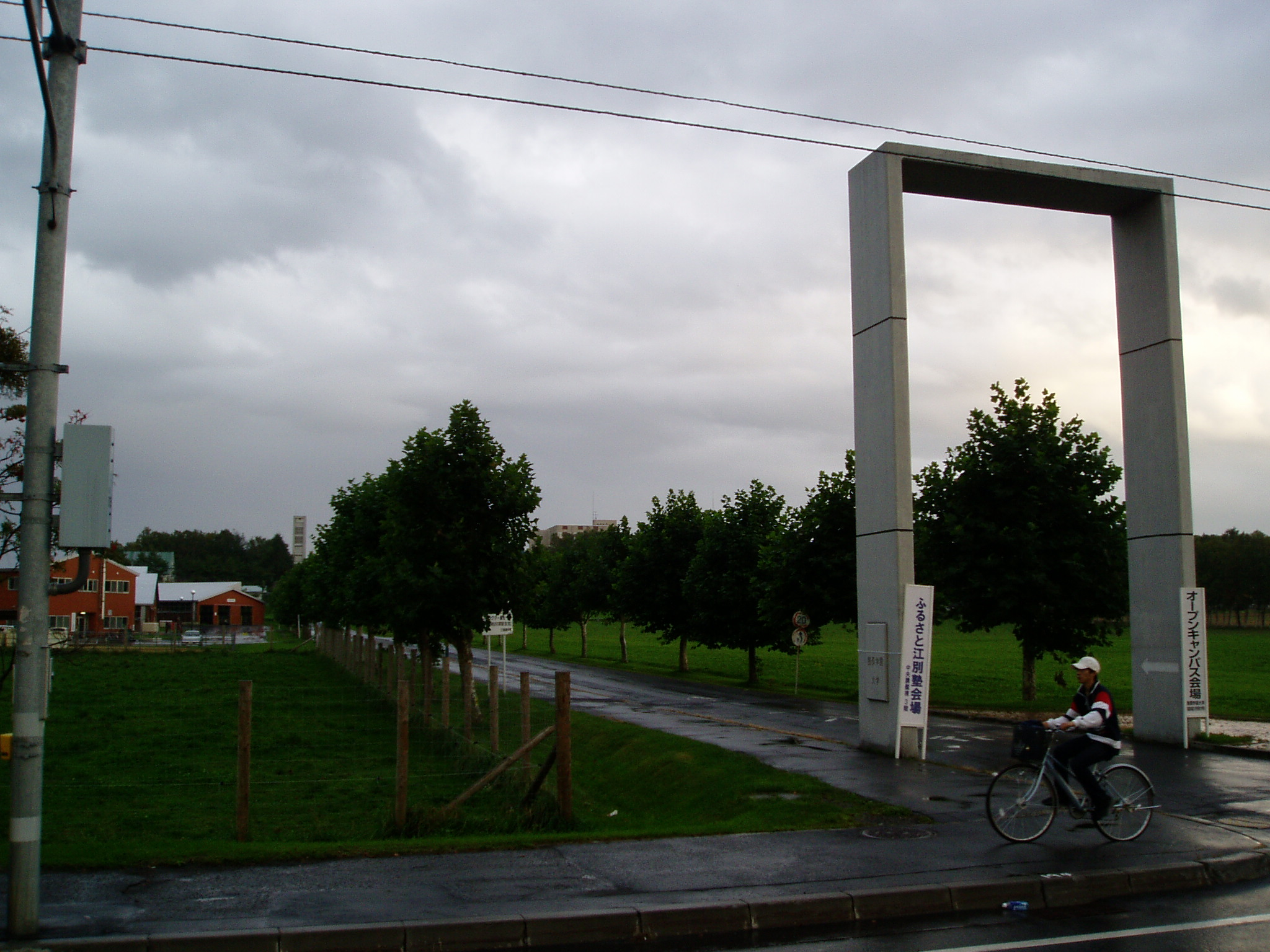
- Type: Private university
- Established: 1960; 66 years ago 1933 (predecessor)
- Religious affiliation: Protestant Christianity
- President: Hidetomo Iwano
- Students: 2,925 (2026)
- Location: 582 Bunkyodai Midorimachi, Ebetsu, Hokkaido, Japan
- Website: www.rakuno.ac.jp

Rakuno Gakuen University (酪農学園大学, Rakunō gakuen daigaku) is a private university in Ebetsu, Hokkaido, Japan, established in 1960. Its name, Rakunō (酪農; lit. ‘dairy agriculture’), refers to the university's predecessor, a public-school teaching dairy farming founded in 1933. Its specializations remain agriculture and veterinary medicine to this day. Gakuen (学園) means simply "school" (of any level), being part of its former names.

== Overview ==
Founded by Torizō Kurosawa, a key figure in the development of Japan's dairy agriculture and Hokkaido, the school boasts one of the largest campuses among private institutions in Japan. It is also one of only 17 universities in the country to offer a six-year program in veterinary medicine, complete with its own veterinary hospital. Other departments offer four-year programs.

The university's founder was baptized at the Japanese Methodist Church in Sapporo in the early 1900's. Because of that, the school is influenced by Christianity, and chapel services are held every Tuesday on campus.
