= Kita, Hokkaido =

Former village in Sorachi Subprefecture, Japan

Kita 北村 きたむら
- Town
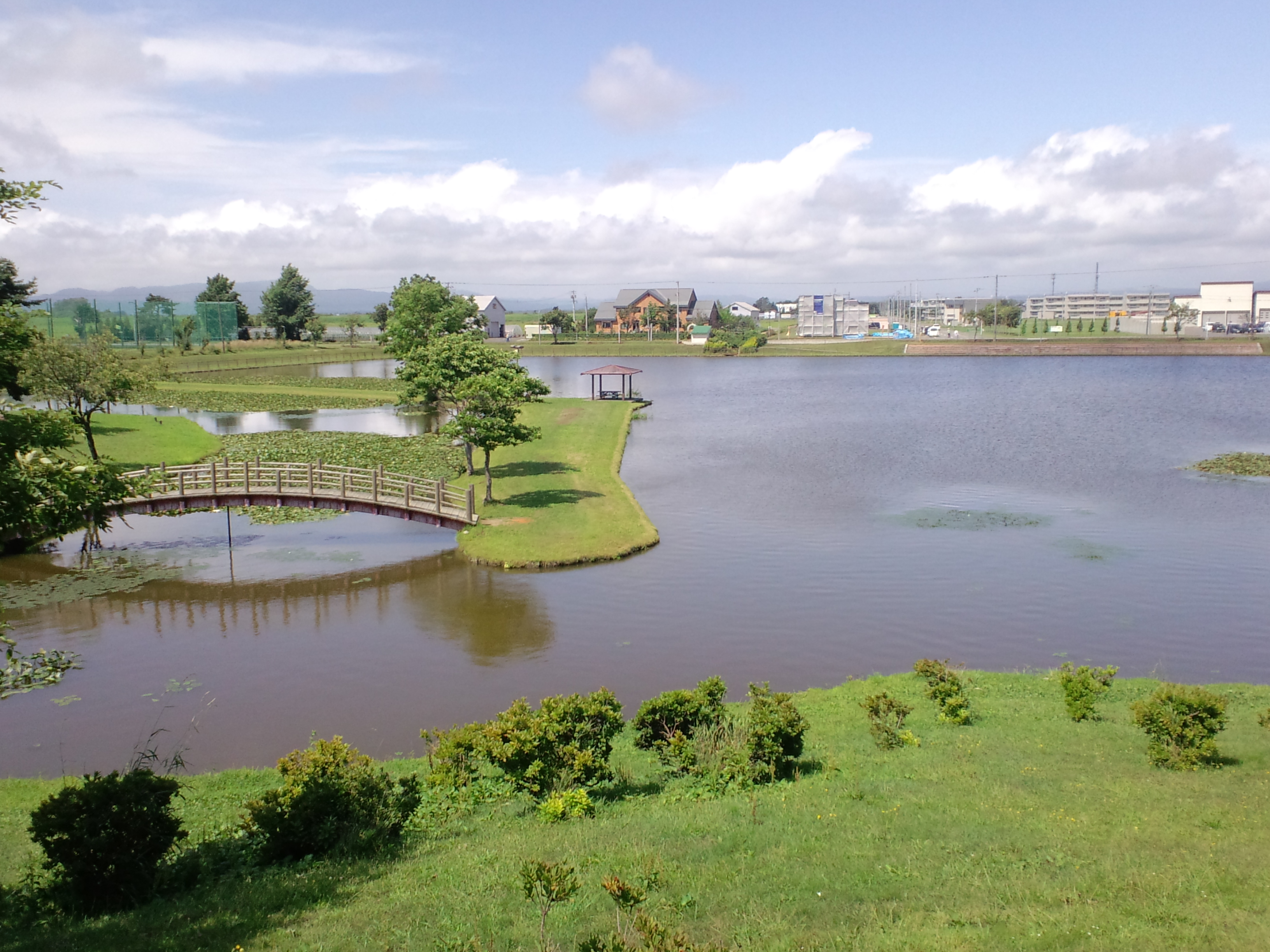
- Kitamura Central Park

- Flag Seal
- Interactive map of Kita
- Country: Japan
- Region: Hokkaido
- Prefecture: Hokkaido
- Subprefecture: Sorachi
- District: Sorachi

Area
  - Total: 96.49 km^{2} (37.25 sq mi)

Population (2003)
  - Total: 3,671
  - Density: 38.05/km^{2} (98.54/sq mi)

Kita (北村, Kita-mura) was a village located in Sorachi District, Sorachi Subprefecture, Hokkaido, Japan.

As of 2004, the village had an estimated population of 3,671 and a density of 38.05 persons per km^{2}. The total area was 96.49 km^{2}.

On March 27, 2006, Kita, along with the town of Kurisawa (also from Sorachi District) was merged into the expanded city of Iwamizawa.
