= Shibun Station =

Railway station in Iwamizawa, Hokkaido, Japan

Coordinates: 43.1584°N 141.7441°E

Shibun Station 志文駅
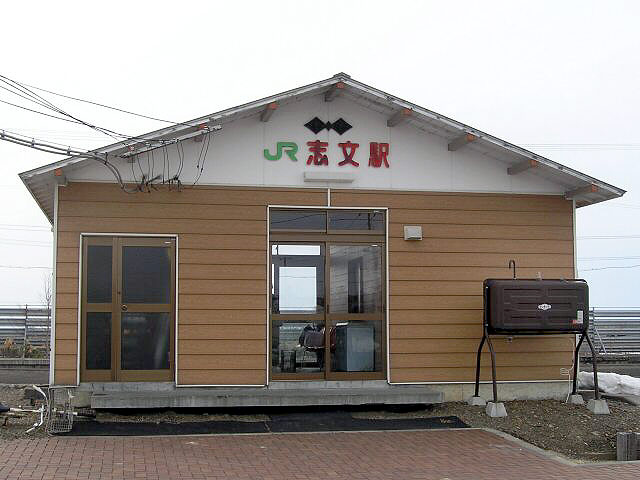
- Station building, April 2005

General information
- Location: Iwamizawa, Hokkaido; Japan
- Operator: JR Hokkaido
- Line: ■ Muroran Main Line
- Distance: 203.9 km from Oshamambe
- Platforms: 2 side platforms
- Tracks: 2

Other information
- Status: Unstaffed

History
- Opened: August 1, 1902
Location

Shibun Station (志文駅, Shibun-eki) is a train station in Iwamizawa, Hokkaidō, Japan.

== Lines ==
Shibun Station is served by the Muroran Main Line.

== Station layout ==
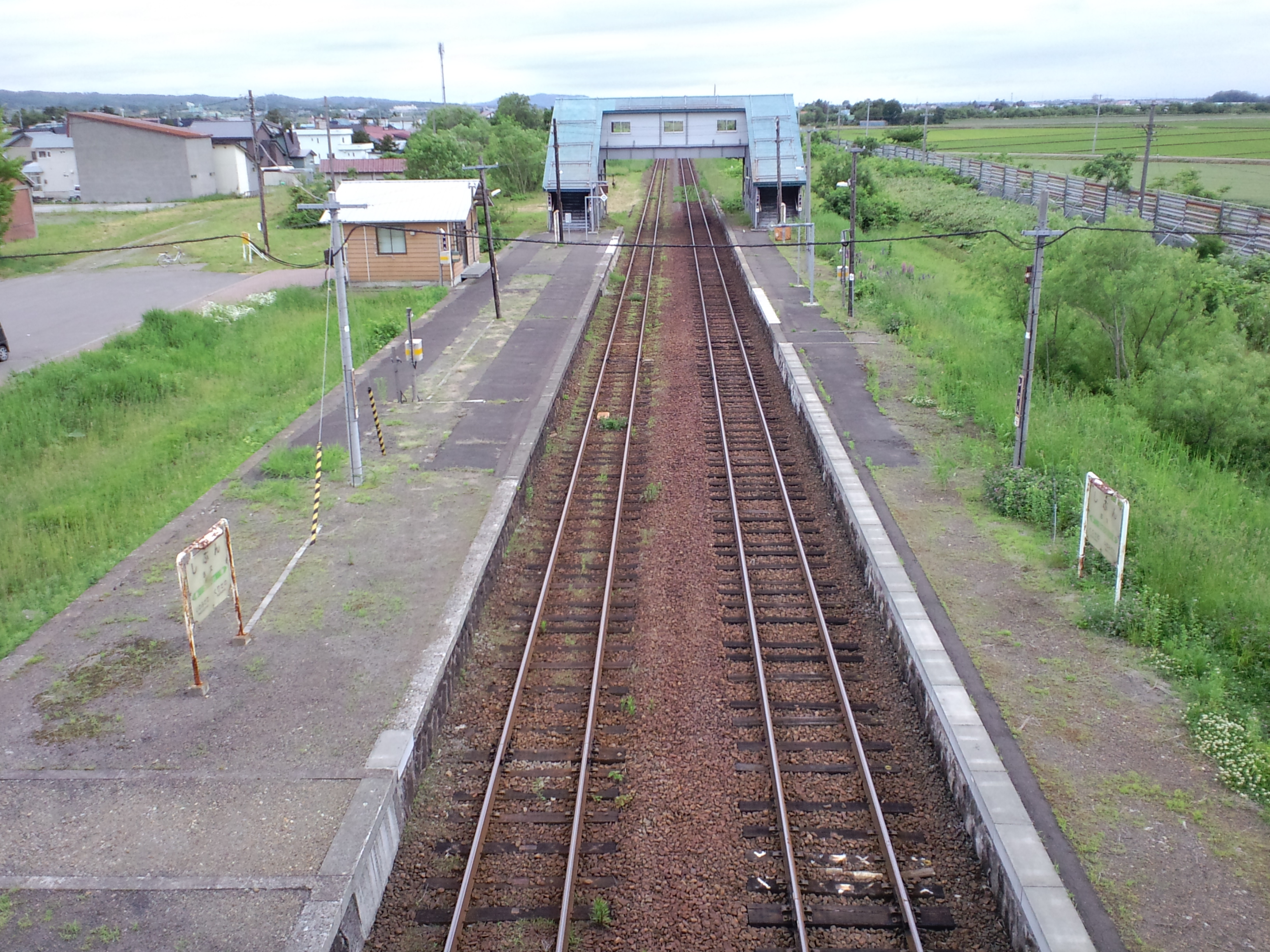
platforms

The station has two ground-level opposed side platforms serving two track. Kitaca is not available. The station is unattended.

=== Platforms ===
1	■ Muroran Main Line	for Oiwake and Tomakomai
2	■ Muroran Main Line	for Iwamizawa

== Adjacent stations ==
«	Service	»
Muroran Main Line
Kurisawa	-	Iwamizawa (A13)
