= Ebetsu Station =

Railway station in Ebetsu, Hokkaido, Japan

Coordinates: 43.1110°N 141.5570°E

Ebetsu Station 江別駅
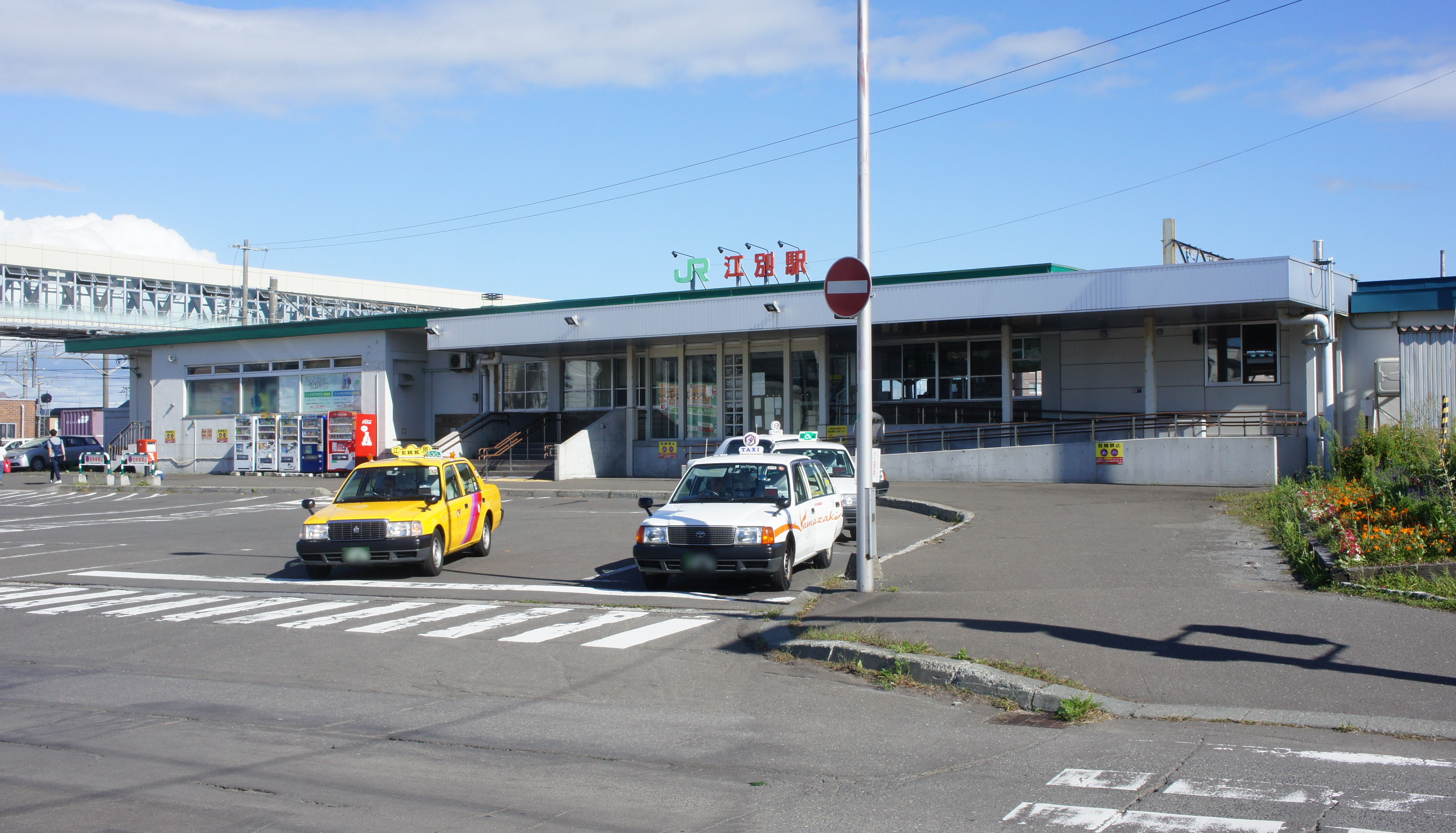
- Station building, September 2018

General information
- Location: Ebetsu, Hokkaido; Japan
- Operator: JR Hokkaido
- Line: Hakodate Main Line
- Distance: 307.3 km from Hakodate
- Platforms: 1 side + 1 island platforms
- Tracks: 4

Other information
- Status: Staffed
- Station code: A09

History
- Opened: November 13, 1882

Passengers
- FY2014: 3,964 daily
Location

Ebetsu Station (江別駅, Ebetsu-eki) is a railway station in Ebetsu, Hokkaidō, Japan. The station is numbered A09.

== Lines ==
Ebetsu Station is served by Hakodate Main Line.

== Station layout ==
The station consists of one side platform and one island platform serving four tracks. The station has automated ticket machines, automated turnstiles which accept Kitaca, and a "Midori no Madoguchi" staffed ticket office.

=== Platforms ===
1	■ Hakodate Main Line	for Sapporo and Otaru
2	■ Hakodate Main Line	for Sapporo and Otaru for Iwamizawa and Asahikawa
3	■ Hakodate Main Line	for Iwamizawa and Asahikawa
4	■ Hakodate Main Line	for Sapporo and Otaru

== Adjacent stations ==
«	Service	»
Hakodate Main Line
Limited Express Sōya: Does not stop at this station
Limited Express Okhotsk: Does not stop at this station
Nopporo	Semi-Rapid	Toyohoro
Takasago	Local	Toyohoro
