= Minenobu Station =

Railway station in Bibai, Hokkaido, Japan

Coordinates: 43.2643°N 141.8145°E

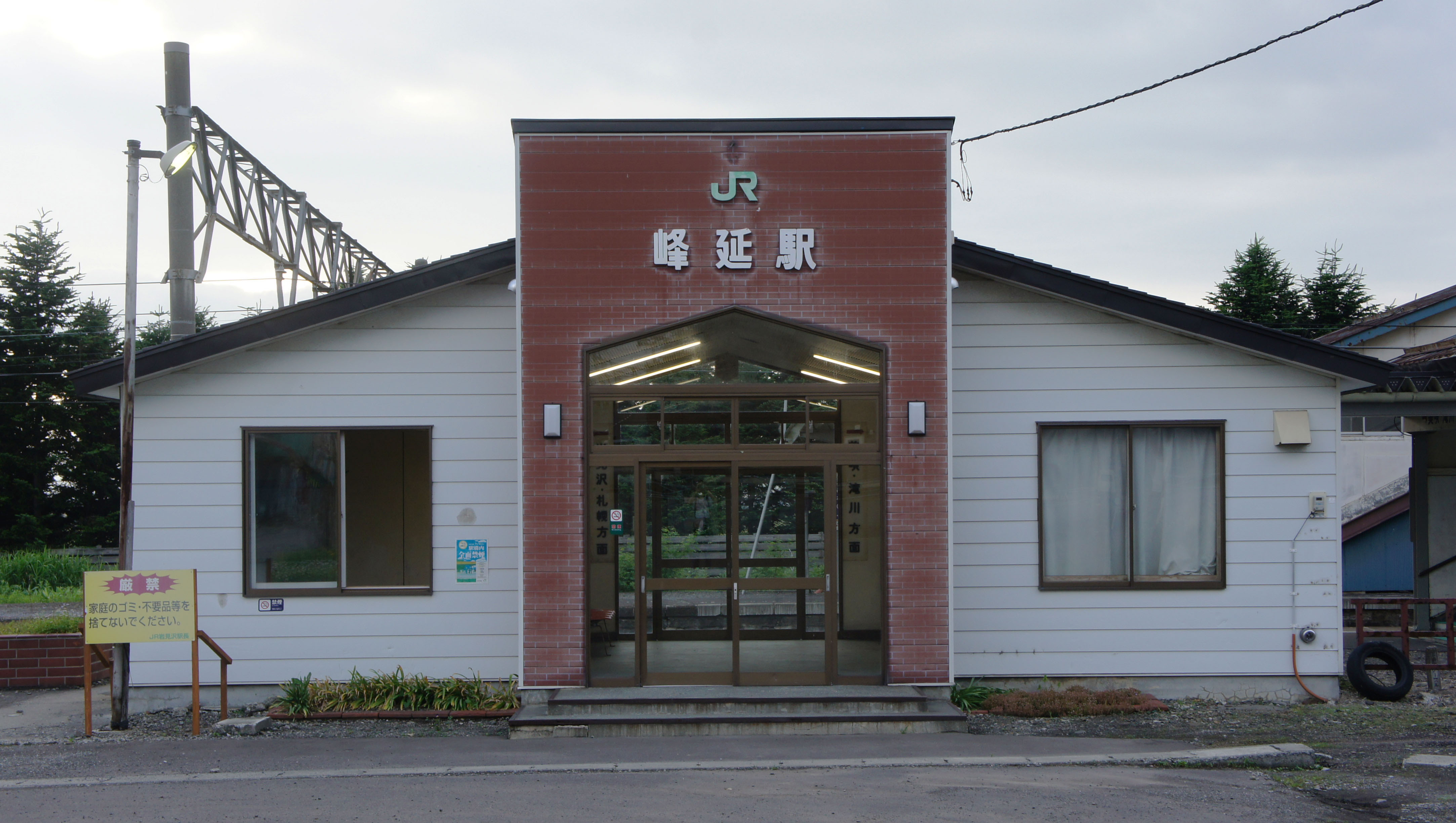
Station building

Minenobu Station (峰延駅, Minenobu-eki) is a railway station in Bibai, Hokkaidō, Japan.

== History ==
The station opened in 1891. It was transferred to the JGR in 1906 and became a station of JR Hokkaidō in 1987.

== Lines ==
- Hokkaido Railway Company
  - Hakodate Main Line Station A14

== Adjacent stations ==
«	Service	»
Hakodate Main Line
Limited Express Sōya: Does not stop at this station
Limited Express Okhotsk: Does not stop at this station
Iwamizawa	Sectional Rapid	Kōshunai
Iwamizawa	Local	Kōshunai
