= Kami-Horomui Station =

Railway station in Iwamizawa, Hokkaido, Japan

Coordinates: 43.1816°N 141.7156°E

Kami-Horomui Station 上幌向駅
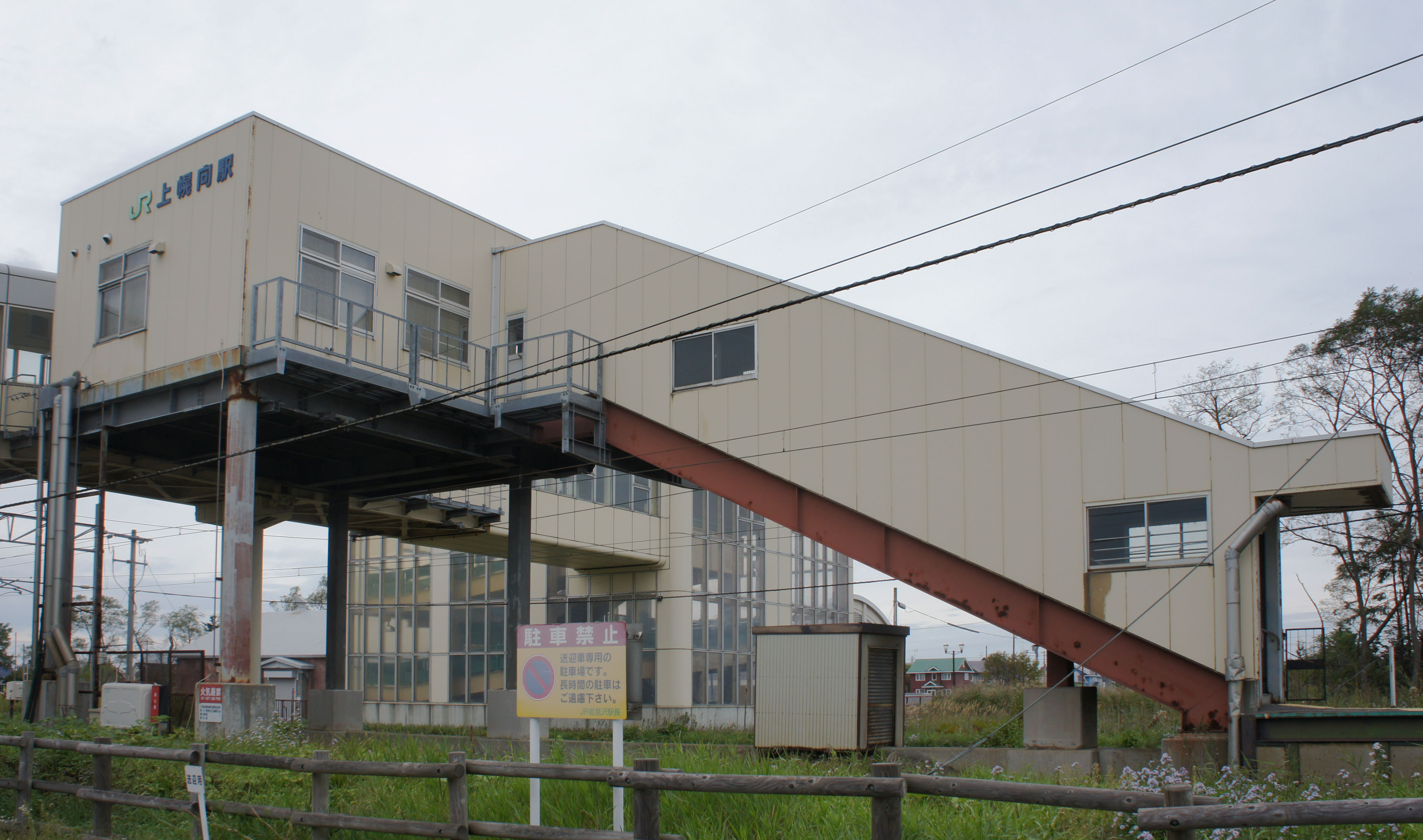
- Kami-Horomui Station in September 2018

General information
- Location: Iwamizawa, Hokkaido; Japan
- Operator: JR Hokkaido
- Line: Hakodate Main Line
- Distance: 322.6 km from Hakodate
- Platforms: 1 island platform
- Tracks: 2

Other information
- Status: Unstaffed
- Station code: A12

History
- Opened: November 25, 1907

Passengers
- FY2014: 480 daily
Location

Kami-Horomui Station (上幌向駅, Kami-Horomui-eki) is a railway station in Iwamizawa, Hokkaidō, Japan. The station is numbered A12.

== Lines ==
Kami-Horomui Station is served by the Hakodate Main Line.

== Station layout ==
The station consists of an island platform serving two tracks, with the station situated above the tracks. The station has automated ticket machines and Kitaca card readers. The station is unattended.

=== Platforms ===
| 1 | ■ Hakodate Main Line | for Sapporo and Otaru |
| 2 | ■ Hakodate Main Line | for Iwamizawa and Asahikawa |

== Adjacent stations ==
| « | Service | » |
Hakodate Main Line
Limited Express Sōya: Does not stop at this station
Limited Express Okhotsk: Does not stop at this station
| Horomui | Semi-Rapid | Iwamizawa |
| Horomui | Local | Iwamizawa |
