= Iwamizawa Shrine =

Shinto shrine in Hokkaido, Japan

Iwamizawa Jinja (岩見沢神社)
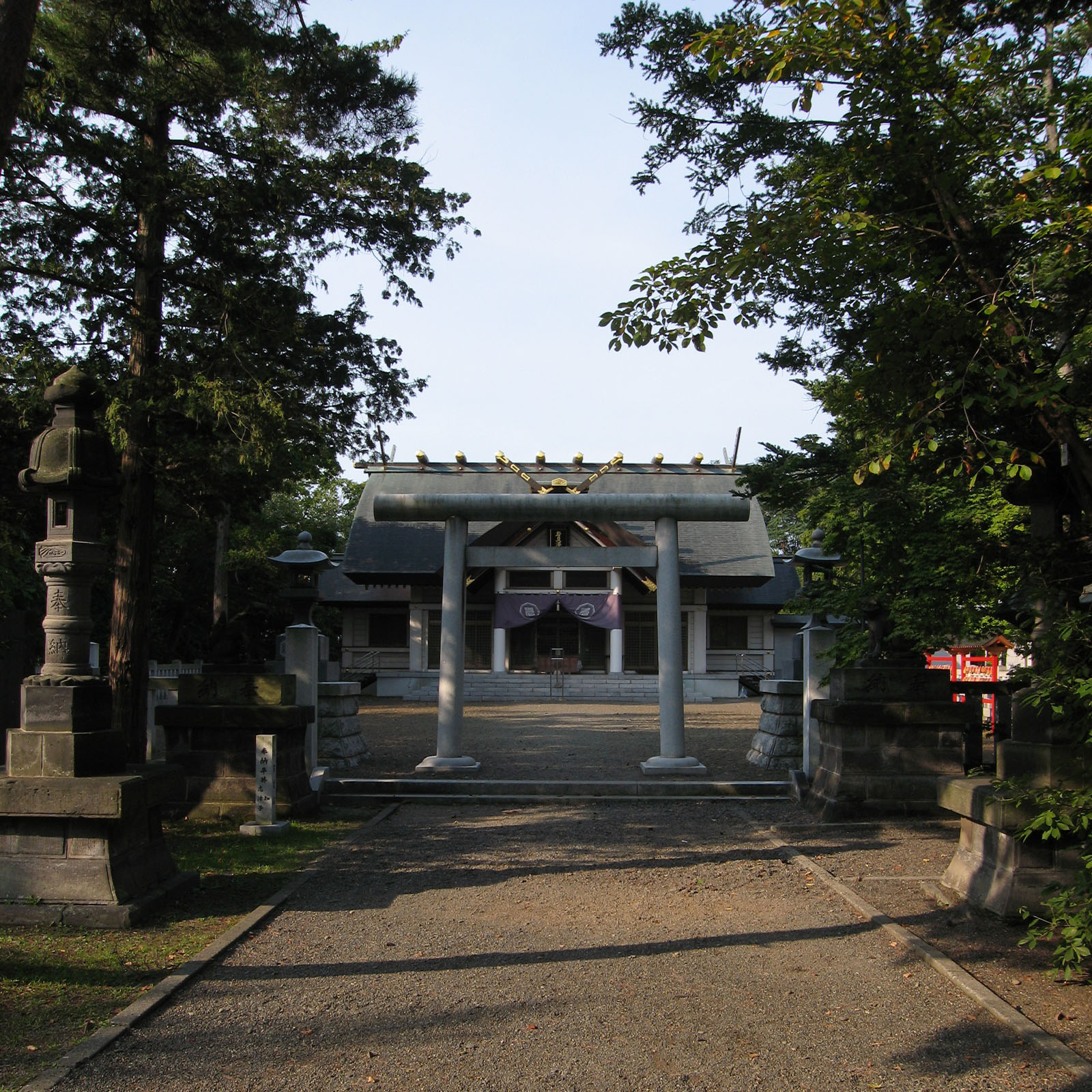
- Iwamizawa Jinja

- Location within Japan

Religion
- Affiliation: Shinto

Location
- Location: Iwamizawa, Hokkaidō, Japan.
- Interactive map of Iwamizawa Jinja (岩見沢神社)
- Coordinates: 43°11′44″N 141°46′23″E

Iwamizawa Jinja (岩見沢神社) is a Shinto shrine in Iwamizawa, Hokkaidō, Japan. Founded in the Meiji period, it is modelled on the shinmei-zukuri style.

== See also ==
- State Shinto
- List of Shinto shrines in Hokkaidō
