= Sorachi District =

District in the country of Japan

Coordinates: 43°26′24″N 142°27′00″E

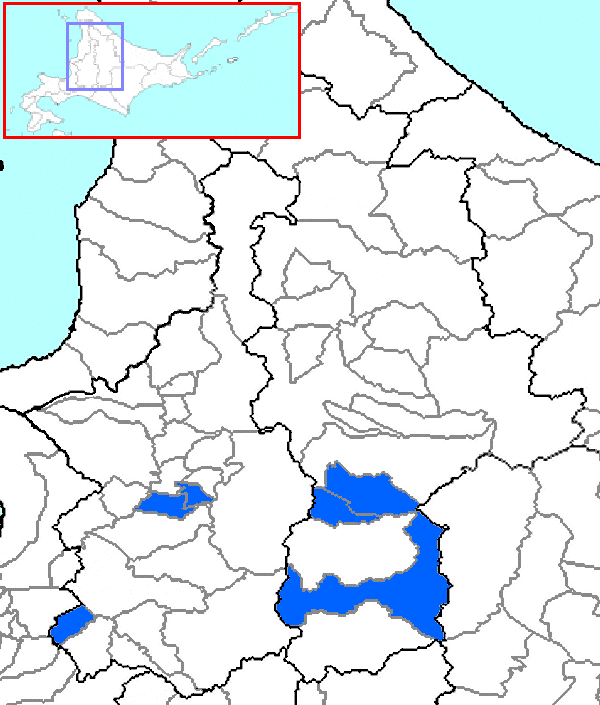
Sorachi District in Sorachi and Kamikawa Subprefecture.

Sorachi (空知郡, Sorachi-gun) is a district divided between Sorachi and Kamikawa Subprefectures, Hokkaido, Japan. As of 2004, the district has an estimated population of 53,011 and an area of 1,497.21 km^{2}, giving a population density of 35.41 persons per square kilometer.

== Towns and Villages ==
=== Sorachi Subprefecture ===
- Kamisunagawa
- Naie
- Nanporo

=== Kamikawa Subprefecture ===
- Kamifurano
- Minamifurano
- Nakafurano

== History ==
- 1869 - With the establishment of provinces and districts in Hokkaido, Sorachi District is created within Ishikari Province.
- 1897 - Subprefectures created, Sorachi District is placed under Sorachi Subprefecture
- 1899 - Furano Village (now Furano City), and the towns of Nakafurano, Minamifurano, and Kamifurano were transferred to Kamikawa Subprefecture
- On March 27, 2006 the town of Kurisawa, and the village of Kita, both in Sorachi Subprefecture, have merged into the city of Iwamizawa.
