= Chashinai Station =

Railway station in Bibai, Hokkaido, Japan

Chashinai Station 茶志内駅
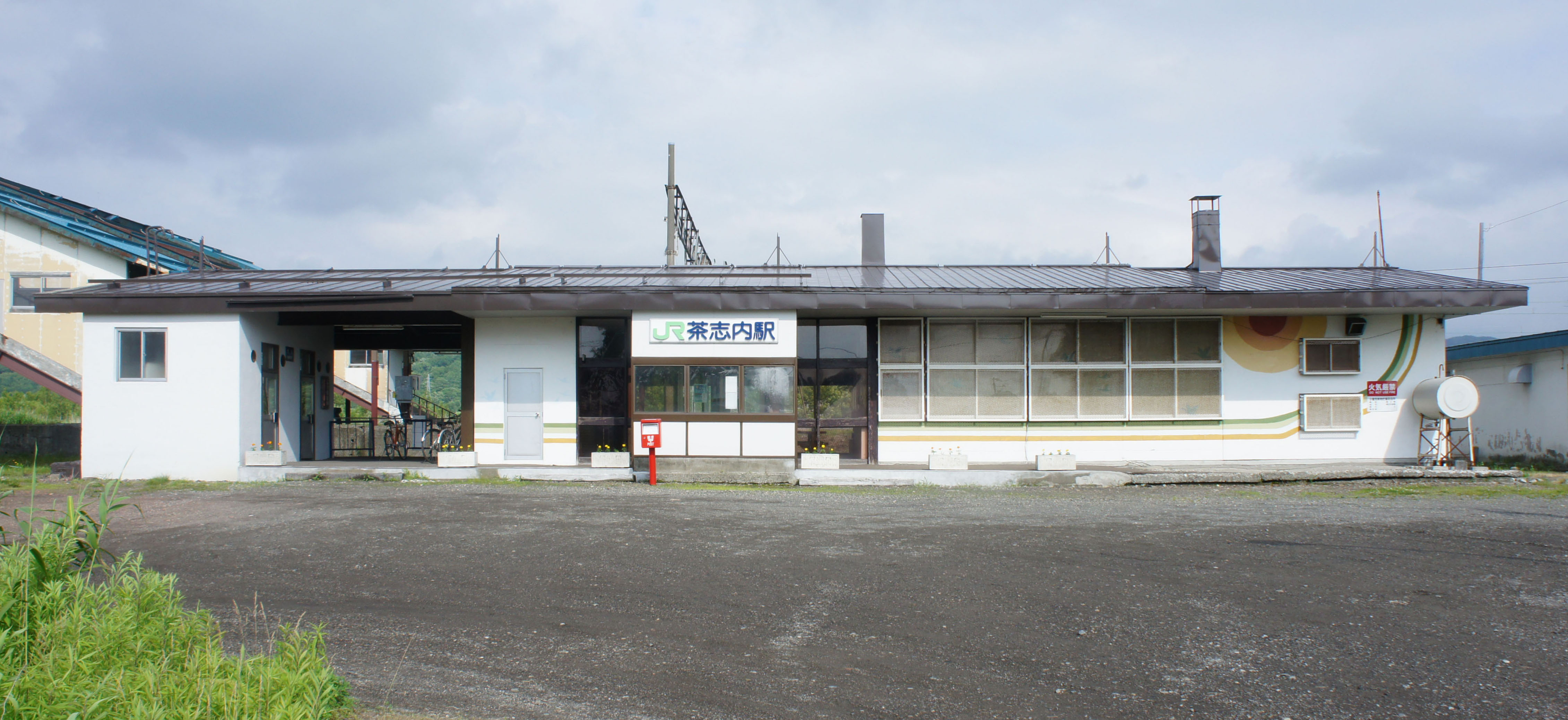

General information
- Location: Bibai, Hokkaidō; Japan
- Coordinates: 43.3696°N 141.8730°E
- Operator: JR Hokkaido
- Line: Hakodate Main Line

Other information
- Station code: A17

History
- Opened: 15 July 1916
Location

Chashinai Station (茶志内駅, Chashinai-eki) is a railway station on the Hakodate Main Line in Bibai, Hokkaidō, Japan, operated by the Hokkaido Railway Company (JR Hokkaido).

== Lines ==
Chashinai Station is served by the Hakodate Main Line. It is numbered A17.

== Adjacent stations ==
«	Service	»
Hakodate Main Line
Limited Express Sōya: Does not stop at this station
Limited express Okhotsk: Does not stop at this station
Bibai	Sectional Rapid	Naie
Bibai	Local	Naie

== History ==
Chashinai Station opened on 15 July 1916.
