= Bibai =

Bibai 美唄市
- City
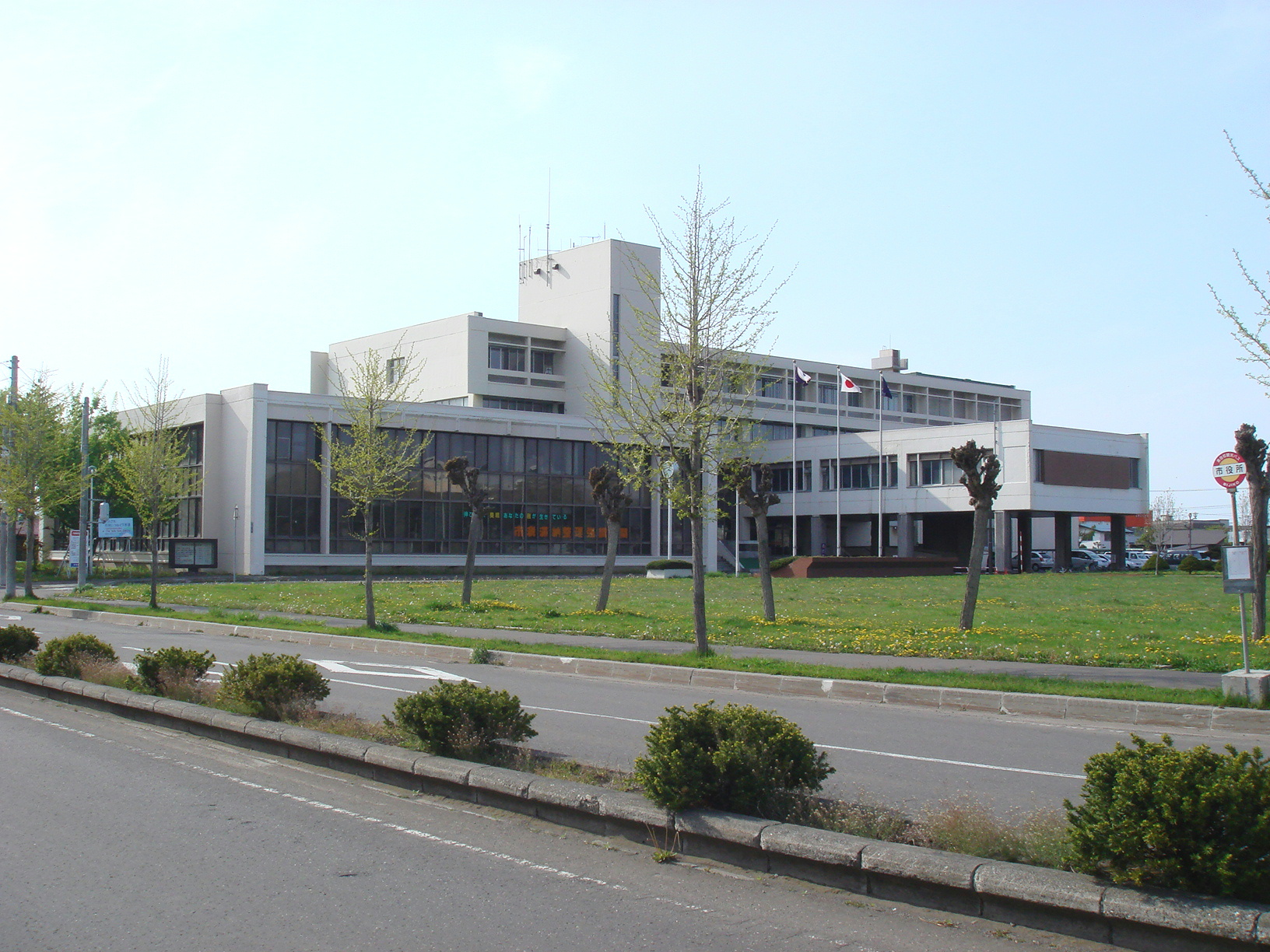
- Bibai city hall

- Flag Emblem

- Location of Bibai in Hokkaido (Sorachi Subprefecture)

- Location in Japan
- Coordinates: 43°20′N 141°51′E
- Country: Japan
- Region: Hokkaido
- Prefecture: Hokkaido (Sorachi Subprefecture)

Government
  - Mayor: Hisashi Sakurai (since 2023)

Area
  - Total: 277.69 km^{2} (107.22 sq mi)

Population (May 31, 2023)
  - Total: 19,242
  - Density: 69.3/km^{2} (179/sq mi)
- Time zone: UTC+09:00 (JST)
- City hall address: 1-1, Minami Itchōme, Nishi San-jō, Bibai-shi, Hokkaidō; 072-8660
- Climate: Dfb
- Website: www.city.bibai.hokkaido.jp
- Symbols
- Bird: Greater white-fronted goose
- Flower: Azalea
- Tree: Poplar

Bibai (美唄市, Bibai-shi) is a city located in Sorachi Subprefecture, Hokkaido, Japan.

As of 2023, the city has an estimated population of 19,242, and the density of 69.3 persons per km^{2}. The total area is 277.69 km^{2} (107.22 sq mi).

== History ==
The name Bibai is derived from Ainu word "pipa o i", meaning "Place (swamp) with many cockscomb pearl mussels".

- 1890 - The village of Numakai was founded.
- 1925 - Numakai village became Numakai town.
- 1926 - Numakai was renamed Bibai.
- 1950 - Bibai town became Bibai city.
- 1982 - Bibai Dam was completed.

At its peak, Bibai was a coal town that produced over a million tons annually. However, ever since the mine was closed in 1972, the city has suffered a slowly declining population.

== Geography ==
The Ishikari River flows to the west of Bibai. The Bibai Dam was built on the Bibai River, a tributary of the Ishikari River.

Lake Miyajima was registered as a wetland under the Ramsar Convention in 2002.

== Climate ==
Climate data for Bibai (elevation 16 m, 1991–2020 normals, extremes 1977–present)
Month	Jan	Feb	Mar	Apr	May	Jun	Jul	Aug	Sep	Oct	Nov	Dec	Year
Record high °C (°F)	8.5 (47.3)	11.7 (53.1)	13.6 (56.5)	25.6 (78.1)	32.6 (90.7)	33.2 (91.8)	35.6 (96.1)	35.6 (96.1)	32.4 (90.3)	27.0 (80.6)	20.0 (68.0)	13.9 (57.0)	35.6 (96.1)
Mean daily maximum °C (°F)	−2.6 (27.3)	−1.4 (29.5)	2.9 (37.2)	10.8 (51.4)	17.9 (64.2)	22.0 (71.6)	25.6 (78.1)	26.3 (79.3)	22.6 (72.7)	15.6 (60.1)	7.2 (45.0)	−0.3 (31.5)	12.2 (54.0)
Daily mean °C (°F)	−6.6 (20.1)	−5.9 (21.4)	−1.5 (29.3)	5.4 (41.7)	12.1 (53.8)	16.5 (61.7)	20.4 (68.7)	21.2 (70.2)	16.9 (62.4)	10.1 (50.2)	3.1 (37.6)	−3.8 (25.2)	7.3 (45.1)
Mean daily minimum °C (°F)	−12.4 (9.7)	−12.1 (10.2)	−6.9 (19.6)	0.1 (32.2)	6.8 (44.2)	12.2 (54.0)	16.6 (61.9)	17.1 (62.8)	11.8 (53.2)	5.0 (41.0)	−1.1 (30.0)	−8.5 (16.7)	2.4 (36.3)
Record low °C (°F)	−29.6 (−21.3)	−26.2 (−15.2)	−22.4 (−8.3)	−12.4 (9.7)	−2.4 (27.7)	3.4 (38.1)	8.0 (46.4)	8.6 (47.5)	2.1 (35.8)	−4.3 (24.3)	−14.5 (5.9)	−26.5 (−15.7)	−29.6 (−21.3)
Average precipitation mm (inches)	77.6 (3.06)	63.5 (2.50)	54.6 (2.15)	53.8 (2.12)	80.8 (3.18)	69.1 (2.72)	122.0 (4.80)	164.9 (6.49)	144.2 (5.68)	120.6 (4.75)	117.6 (4.63)	104.9 (4.13)	1,173.5 (46.20)
Average snowfall cm (inches)	203 (80)	156 (61)	107 (42)	13 (5.1)	0 (0)	0 (0)	0 (0)	0 (0)	0 (0)	1 (0.4)	77 (30)	216 (85)	766 (302)
Average precipitation days (≥ 1.0 mm)	19.5	16.3	13.7	10.7	10.3	8.6	10.0	10.5	11.9	15.1	19.2	21.9	167.7
Mean monthly sunshine hours	63.3	78.4	131.0	167.5	193.6	171.8	156.2	157.8	158.2	130.6	68.5	42.6	1,519.5
Source: Japan Meteorological Agency (1991–2020 normals, extremes 1977–present)

== Demographics ==
Per Japanese census data, the population of Bibai has declined by more than half over the past half-century.

Historical population
Year	Pop.	±%
1970	47,369	—
1980	38,552	−18.6%
1990	35,176	−8.8%
2000	31,183	−11.4%
2010	26,034	−16.5%
2020	20,413	−21.6%

== Education ==
=== High schools ===
- Hokkaido Bibai Shoei High School
- Hokkaido Bibai Seika High School

=== School for special needs ===
- Hokkaido Bibai School for Special Needs

== Transportation ==
=== Rail ===
Hakodate Main Line Minami-Bibai Branch Line used to run from Bibai to Minami-Bibai.

- Hakodate Main Line : Minenobu - Kōshunai - Bibai - Chashinai

=== Road ===
Straight line section of Route 12 is the longest in Japan.

- Hokkaidō Expressway
- Route 12

== Culture ==
=== Mascots ===
Mami-chan and Yakitoriman, the city's mascots

Bibai's mascots are Mami-chan (マミィーちゃん). He is a greater white-fronted goose. He was unveiled in 1986. Yakitoriman (ヤキトリ男, Yakitoriotoko) is Mami-chan's assistant who is a yakitori.
