= Iwamizawa =

Iwamizawa 岩見沢市
- City
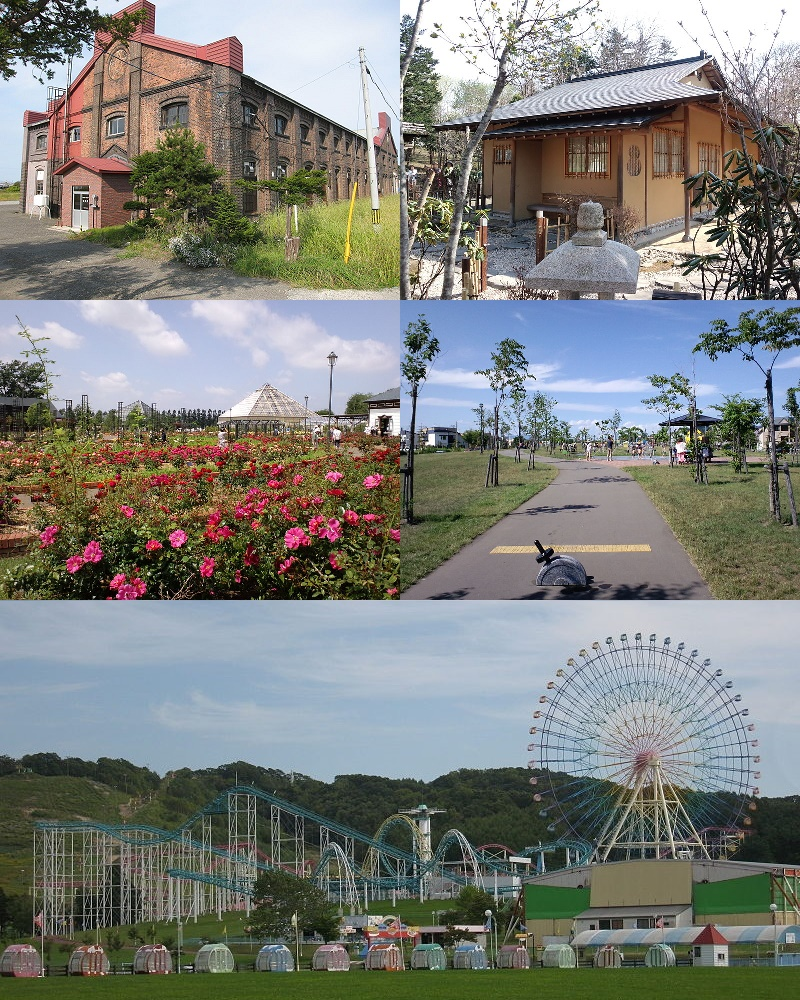

- Flag Emblem

- Location of Iwamizawa in Hokkaido (Sorachi Subprefecture)

- Location in Japan
- Coordinates: 43°12′N 141°47′E
- Country: Japan
- Region: Hokkaido
- Prefecture: Hokkaido (Sorachi Subprefecture)

Government
  - Mayor: Satoru Matsuno

Area
  - Total: 481.02 km^{2} (185.72 sq mi)

Population (July 31, 2023)
  - Total: 75,949
  - Density: 157.89/km^{2} (408.94/sq mi)
- Time zone: UTC+09:00 (JST)
- City hall address: 1-1-1, Hatogaoka, Iwamizawa-shi, Hokkaido; 068-8686
- Climate: Dfb
- Website: www.city.iwamizawa.hokkaido.jp
- Symbols
- Bird: Pigeon
- Flower: Rose
- Tree: Kobushi Magnolia

Iwamizawa (岩見沢市, Iwamizawa-shi; Japanese pronunciation: [ì.β̞ä́.mʲí.(d͡)zä̀.β̞ä̀, -(d͡)zä́.β̞ä́.ɕì]) is a city in Sorachi Subprefecture, Hokkaido, Japan. It is the capital of Sorachi Subprefecture.

As of July 31, 2023, the city had an estimated population of 75,949 and the density of 158 persons per km^{2}. The total area is 481.02 km^{2} (186 sq mi).

On March 27, 2006, the town of Kurisawa, and the village of Kita (both from Sorachi District, Sorachi Subprefecture) merged into Iwamizawa.

== History ==
The name of "Iwamizawa" is derived from Japanese word "Yuamisawa" (浴澤).Yuami (浴) and sawa (澤) means "Bathing" and "A swamp".

Iwamizawa was developed as a hub of land transportation around Iwamizawa Station.

- 1906 - Iwamizawa village became Iwamizawa town.
- 1943 - Iwamizawa town became Iwamizawa city.
- 2006 - Kurisawa town and Kita village were merged into Iwamizawa city.

== Climate ==
Iwamizawa has a humid continental climate (Köppen climate classification Dfb) with warm summers and cold winters. Precipitation is significant throughout the year, but is heaviest from August to October.

Climate data for Iwamizawa (elevation 42.3 m, 1991–2020 normals, extremes 1946–present)
Month	Jan	Feb	Mar	Apr	May	Jun	Jul	Aug	Sep	Oct	Nov	Dec	Year
Record high °C (°F)	8.7 (47.7)	12.7 (54.9)	16.6 (61.9)	26.8 (80.2)	33.1 (91.6)	33.6 (92.5)	36.1 (97.0)	35.7 (96.3)	32.7 (90.9)	26.3 (79.3)	20.5 (68.9)	14.3 (57.7)	36.1 (97.0)
Mean maximum °C (°F)	4.3 (39.7)	5.6 (42.1)	10.9 (51.6)	20.3 (68.5)	26.3 (79.3)	28.4 (83.1)	30.7 (87.3)	31.3 (88.3)	28.2 (82.8)	21.6 (70.9)	16.3 (61.3)	8.6 (47.5)	32.1 (89.8)
Mean daily maximum °C (°F)	−1.9 (28.6)	−0.9 (30.4)	3.5 (38.3)	11.2 (52.2)	17.7 (63.9)	21.7 (71.1)	25.1 (77.2)	26.1 (79.0)	22.4 (72.3)	15.7 (60.3)	7.6 (45.7)	0.5 (32.9)	12.4 (54.3)
Daily mean °C (°F)	−5.3 (22.5)	−4.6 (23.7)	−0.4 (31.3)	6.1 (43.0)	12.1 (53.8)	16.3 (61.3)	20.2 (68.4)	21.3 (70.3)	17.4 (63.3)	10.8 (51.4)	3.9 (39.0)	−2.6 (27.3)	7.9 (46.2)
Mean daily minimum °C (°F)	−9.2 (15.4)	−8.9 (16.0)	−4.5 (23.9)	1.3 (34.3)	7.1 (44.8)	12.0 (53.6)	16.6 (61.9)	17.6 (63.7)	12.9 (55.2)	6.2 (43.2)	0.2 (32.4)	−6.0 (21.2)	3.8 (38.8)
Mean minimum °C (°F)	−16.7 (1.9)	−16.6 (2.1)	−11.5 (11.3)	−3.8 (25.2)	1.0 (33.8)	6.8 (44.2)	11.8 (53.2)	12.4 (54.3)	6.6 (43.9)	0.4 (32.7)	−6.0 (21.2)	−13.8 (7.2)	−18.0 (−0.4)
Record low °C (°F)	−24.3 (−11.7)	−23.0 (−9.4)	−22.0 (−7.6)	−10.9 (12.4)	−3.6 (25.5)	2.5 (36.5)	5.2 (41.4)	6.9 (44.4)	−1.0 (30.2)	−4.0 (24.8)	−14.6 (5.7)	−22.6 (−8.7)	−24.3 (−11.7)
Average precipitation mm (inches)	119.4 (4.70)	85.5 (3.37)	59.4 (2.34)	52.7 (2.07)	83.9 (3.30)	69.5 (2.74)	111.5 (4.39)	161.1 (6.34)	142.2 (5.60)	110.4 (4.35)	118.8 (4.68)	144.5 (5.69)	1,248.5 (49.15)
Average snowfall cm (inches)	187 (74)	137 (54)	72 (28)	8 (3.1)	0 (0)	0 (0)	0 (0)	0 (0)	0 (0)	1 (0.4)	70 (28)	200 (79)	664 (261)
Average precipitation days (≥ 0.5 mm)	22.4	19.3	16.1	12.3	11.9	9.9	11.1	11.4	12.0	15.8	19.9	24.1	185.6
Average snowy days	21.7	19.5	15.9	3.1	0.0	0.0	0.0	0.0	0.0	0.3	8.6	21.6	90.3
Average relative humidity (%)	81	78	74	68	71	78	81	81	79	77	78	81	77
Mean monthly sunshine hours	90.2	111.3	161.9	176.6	196.5	173.6	156.2	158.8	161.9	138.5	84.7	69.0	1,679.1
Source: Japan Meteorological Agency (1991–2020 normals, extremes 1946–present)

== Transportation ==
=== Rail ===
In the past, Horonai Line and Manji Line ran from Iwamizawa.

- Hakodate Main Line : Horomui - Kami-Horomui - Iwamizawa
- Muroran Main Line : Kurioka - Kurisawa - Shibun - Iwamizawa

=== Road ===
- Hokkaidō Expressway : Iwamizawa IC
- Route 12

== Education ==
=== Universities ===
- Hokkaido University of Education, Iwamizawa Campus

=== High schools ===
- Iwamizawa City Board of Education
  - Hokkaido Iwamizawa Higashi High School
  - Hokkaido Iwamizawa Nishi High School
  - Hokkaido Iwamizawa Agricultural High School
  - Hokkaido Iwamizawa Ryokuryo High School

== Culture ==
=== Mascot ===
Iwamizawa's mascot is Iwami-chan (いわみちゃん). He is a playful onion who likes food. He was unveiled on 3 October 2010. He is assisted by Kuri-chan (クリちゃん) who is a female squirrel from Kurisawa.

Iwami-chan and Kuri-chan, the city's mascots

== Religion ==
- Iwamizawa Jinja, a Shinto shrine

== Sister cities ==
- (United States) Pocatello, Idaho - The city was founded on April 1, 1943. Youth delegates are often sent from one to the other.
- (United States) Canby, Oregon
