= Iwamizawa Station =

Railway station in Iwamizawa, Hokkaido, Japan

Coordinates: 43.204073°N 141.759886°E

A13 Iwamizawa Station 岩見沢駅
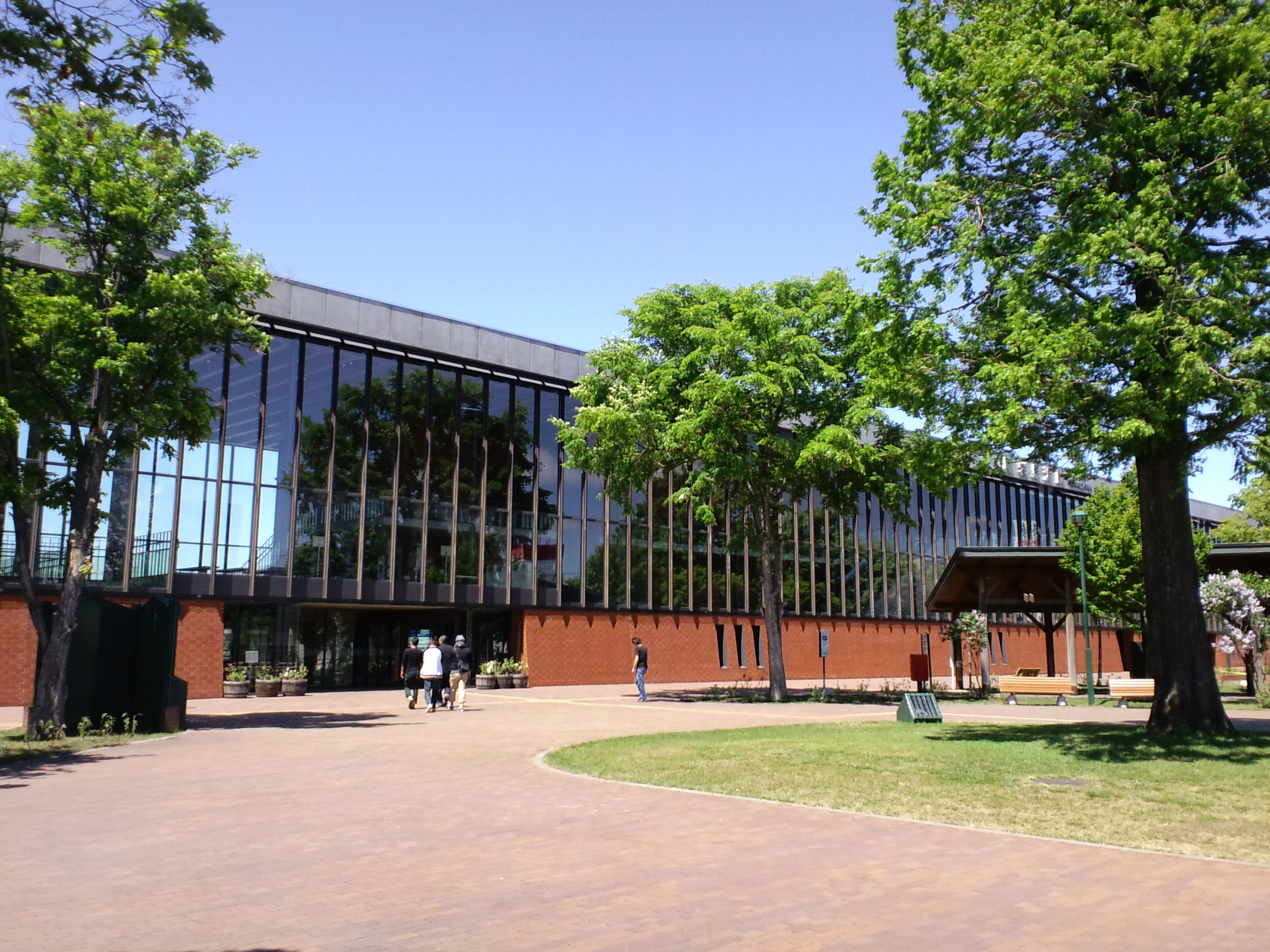
- Station building

General information
- Location: 1-1 South Ariakecho, Iwamizawa City, Hokkaido Prefecture; Japan
- Operator: JR Hokkaido
- Lines: Hakodate Main Line; Muroran Main Line
- Distance: 326.9 km (203.1 mi) from Hakodate
- Platforms: 1 side + 2 island platforms
- Tracks: 5

Other information
- Status: Staffed
- Station code: A13

History
- Opened: 15 August 1884; 142 years ago

Passengers
- FY2014: 4,542 daily

Services
Preceding station	JR Hokkaido	Following station
Local
Shibun towards Oshamambe	Muroran Main Line Local	Terminus
Kami-Horomui towards Hakodate	Hakodate Main Line Local	Minenobu towards Asahikawa
Limited Express
Sapporo Terminus	Sōya	Takikawa towards Wakkanai
Sapporo Terminus	Okhotsk	Bibai towards Abashiri
Sapporo Terminus	Lilac	Bibai towards Asahikawa
Sapporo Terminus	Kamui	Bibai towards Asahikawa
Location
- Location within Hokkaido Location within Japan

Iwamizawa Station (岩見沢駅, Iwamizawa-eki) is a railway station in Iwamizawa, Hokkaido, Japan, operated by the Hokkaido Railway Company (JR Hokkaido). The station is numbered A13.

== Lines ==
Iwamizawa Station is served by the Hakodate Main Line and Muroran Main Line.

== Station layout ==
The station consists of one side platform and two island platforms serving five tracks. The station has automated ticket machines, automated turnstiles which accept Kitaca, and a "Midori no Madoguchi" staffed ticket office.

=== Platforms ===
1	■ Hakodate Main Line	for Sapporo and Otaru
1	■ Muroran Main Line	for Oiwake and Tomakomai
3	■ Hakodate Main Line	for Sapporo and Otaru for Takikawa and Asahikawa
3	■ Muroran Main Line	for Oiwake and Tomakomai
4	■ Hakodate Main Line	for Sapporo (mainly Limited express)
6	■ Hakodate Main Line	for Asahikawa, Wakkanai, and Abashiri (mainly Limited express)
7	■ Hakodate Main Line	for Sapporo and Otaru for Takikawa and Asahikawa

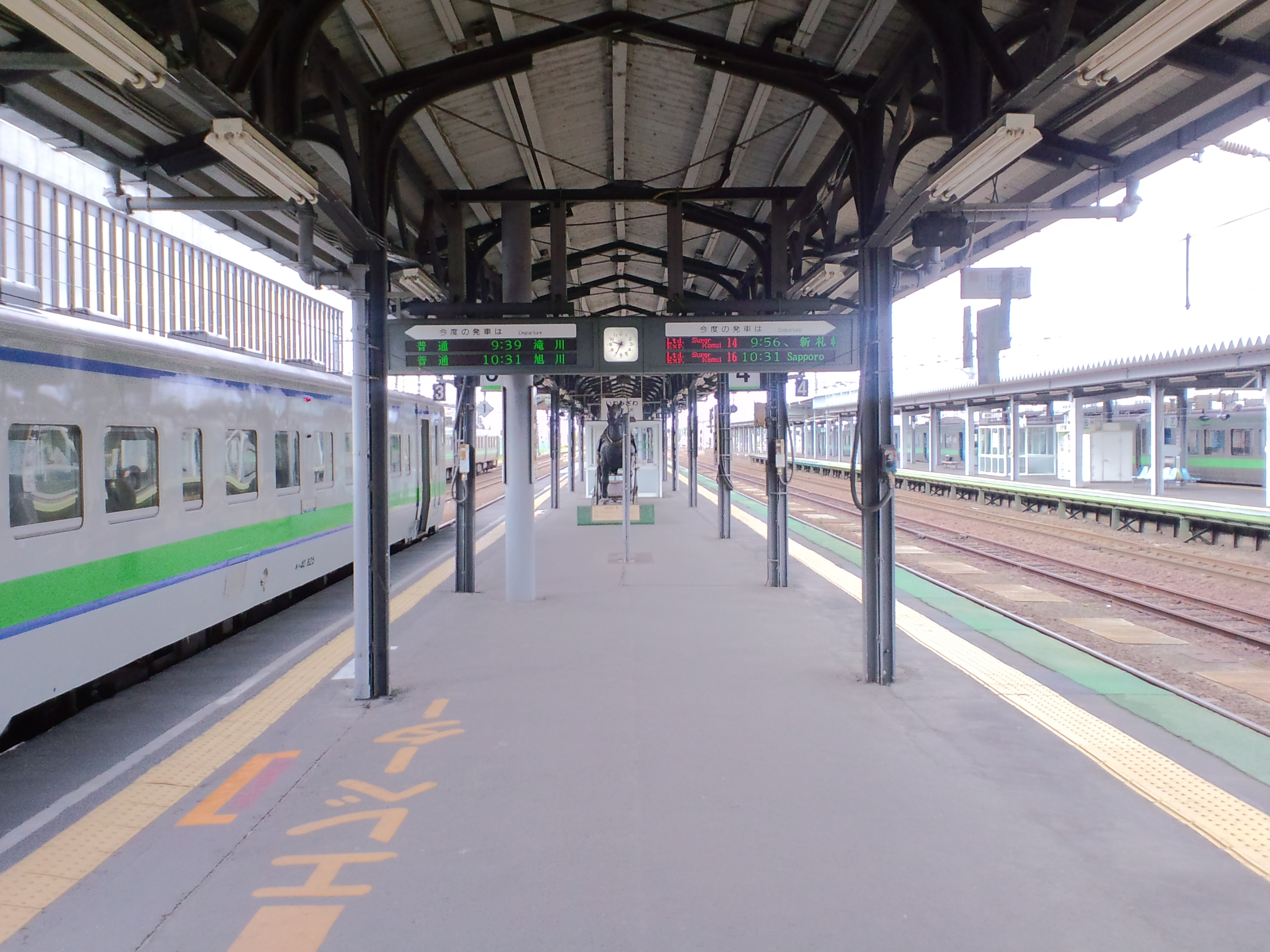
Platform 3-4

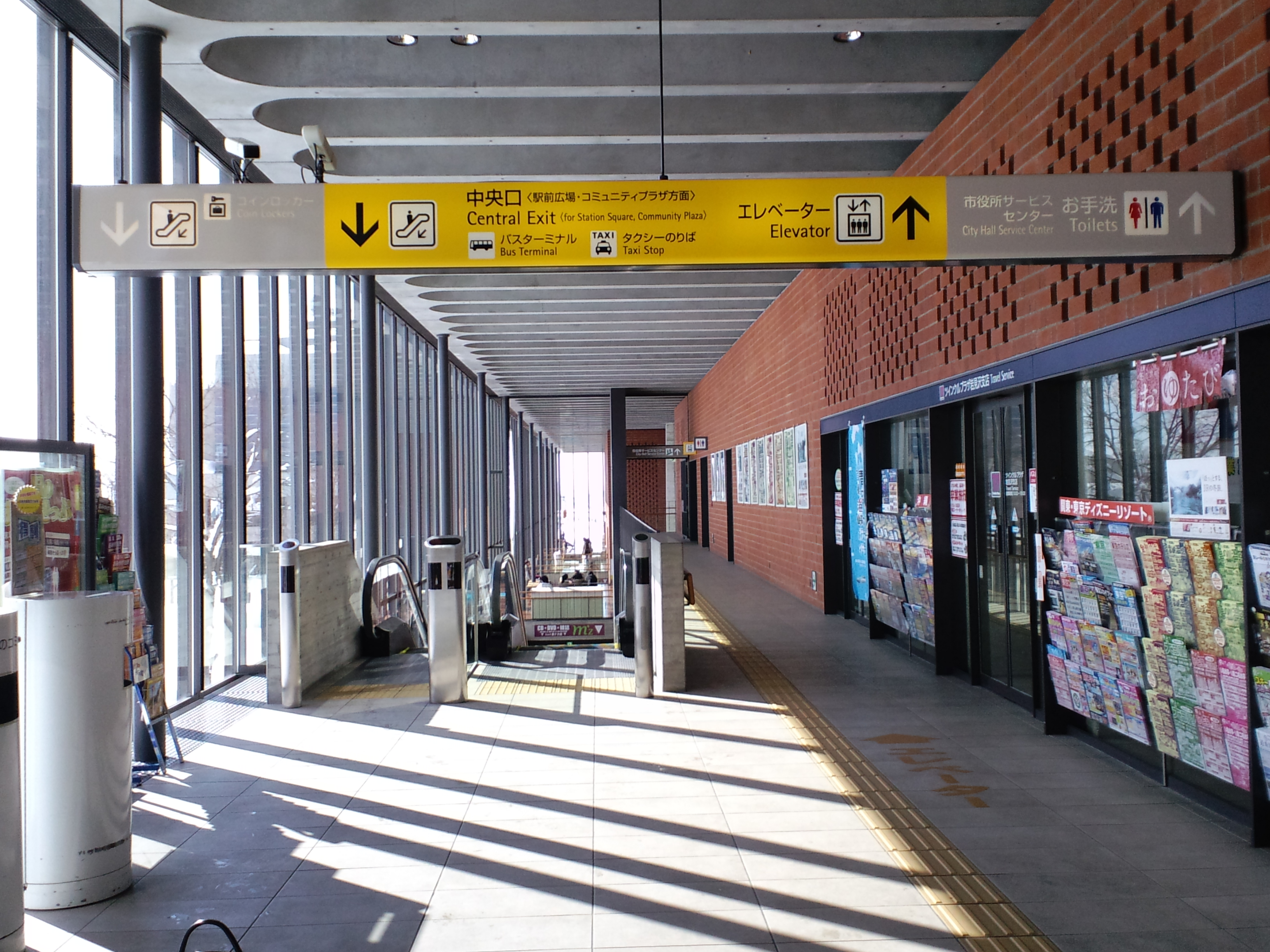
The third-floor concourse

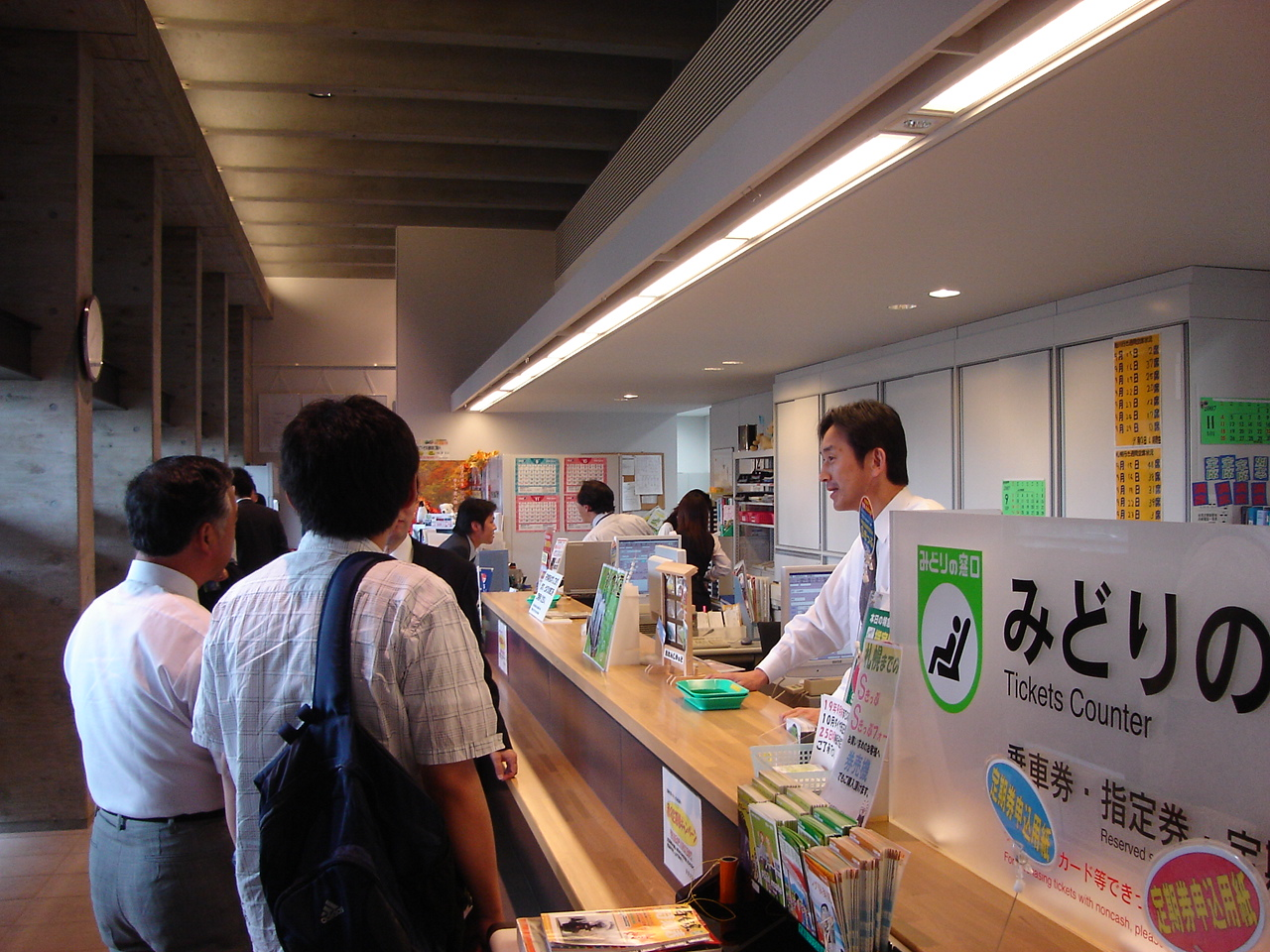
The ticket office

== See also ==
- List of railway stations in Japan
