= Japan National Route 12 =

National highway in Hokkaido, Japan

National Route 12
- 国道12号
- Japan National Route 12 highlighted in red

Route information
- Length: 135.7 km (84.3 mi)
- Existed: 4 December 1952–present

Major junctions
- South end: National Route 36 / National Route 230 in Chūō-ku, Sapporo
- National Route 5; National Route 275; National Route 234; National Route 451; National Route 38; National Route 233; National Route 237
- North end: National Route 39 / National Route 40 in Asahikawa

Location
- Country: Japan

Highway system
- National highways of Japan; Expressways of Japan
← National Route 11	→ National Route 13

National Route 12 (国道12号, Kokudō Jūni-gō) is a Japanese national highway connecting the two largest cities of Hokkaido, Sapporo and Asahikawa. The 135.7-kilometer-long (84.3 mi) highway begins at an intersection with National Routes 36 and 230 in Sapporo. It travels northeast across the western side of Hokkaido to Asahikawa where it ends at an intersection with National Routes 39 and 40.

== Route description ==
National Route 12 is a 135.7-kilometer-long (84.3 mi) highway in western Hokkaido that runs north from Sapporo to Asahikawa. Its southern terminus lies at an intersection in Chūō-ku, Sapporo where it meets National Routes 36 and 230. Along the way from Sapporo to Asahikawa, it passes through the cities of Ebetsu, Iwamizawa, Takikawa, and Fukagawa. The highway is closely paralleled by the tolled Dō-Ō Expressway and it functions as free alternative route to the expressway between Sapporo and Asahikawa. A notable section of the highway between the cities of Bibai and Takikawa is known for being the longest straight section of roadway in Japan. Marked as being 29.2 kilometers (18.1 mi) long, there is actually a slight curve in Takikawa, bringing the actual length of the straight section of the road down to 27.7 kilometers (17.2 mi). Its northern terminus in Asahikawa is the intersection where it meets National Routes 39 and 40.

== History ==
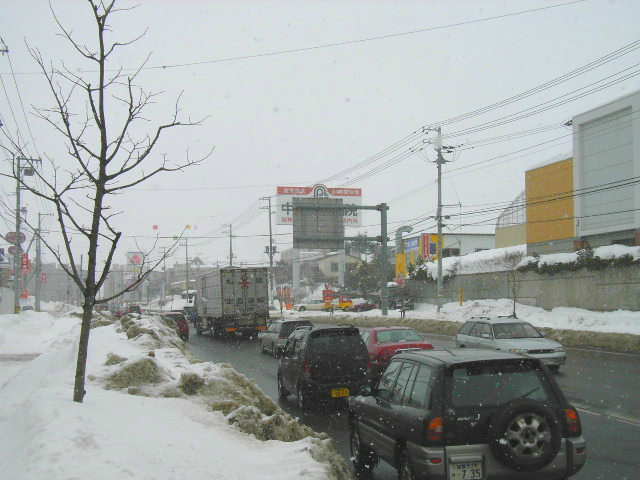
National Route 12 in eastern Sapporo during the winter

National Route 12 was preceded by the Kamikawa Road, an 88-kilometer-long (55 mi), Meiji period road built to link the current cities of Mikasa and Asahikawa. Ordered by Genrōin secretary Kaneko Kentarō, construction on the road began in April 1886. It was completed in 90 days by making use of prison labor from the prisoners that were to be incarcerated at Abashiri Prison in northeastern Hokkaido. The prison laborers were mainly political dissidents that Kaneko viewed as morally deficient. Construction of the Kamikawa Road and the others leading from the more-developed southern part of Hokkaido to the prison were of strategic importance to Japan, which viewed Hokkaido as being vulnerable to an invasion from their neighbor, the Russian Empire. On 4 December 1952 the highway was designated by the Cabinet of Japan as Primary National Highway 12 between Sapporo and Asahikawa. On 1 April 1965 it was reclassified as General National Highway 12 without any changes being made to its routing.

== Major junctions ==
The route lies entirely within Hokkaido.

Location	km	mi	Destinations	Notes
Sapporo	0.0	0.0	National Route 36 south – Chitose; National Route 230 west – Otaru, Teine; Hokkaido Route 18 – Sapporo Station	Southern terminus; highway continues west as National Route 230
Sapporo	0.4	0.25	National Route 5 south (Sōseikawa-dōri) – Ishikari	
Sapporo	1.2	0.75	Hokkaido Route 3 east – Ichijo-ohashi Bridge	
Sapporo	2.3	1.4	National Route 275 north – Tsukigata, Tōbetsu	
Sapporo	4.8	3.0	Hokkaido Route 89 (Kanjō-dōri) – to Dō-Ō Expressway, Sasson Expressway, National Route 36, Misono, Kitago	
Sapporo	5.2	3.2	Hokkaido Route 368 north – Shiroishi Station	
Sapporo	7.1	4.4	Hokkaido Route 453 west – to National Route 36, Tsukisamu	
Sapporo	9.3	5.8	National Route 274 south	Exit ramp from National Route 274 south to National Route 12 only
Sapporo	10.2	6.3	Hokkaido Route 3 – to Dō-Ō Expressway, National Route 274, Ryutsu Center, Kitahiroshima	
Sapporo	11.4	7.1	Hokkaido Route 1138 south (Atsubetsu-chūō-dōri) – to National Route 36, Satozuka	
Ebetsu	19.0	11.8	Hokkaido Route 1005 south – Kitahiroshima	
Ebetsu	19.3	12.0	Hokkaido Route 46 north – Kakuyama; Hokkaido Route 370 east – Nopporo Station	Southern end of Hokkaido Route 46 concurrency
Ebetsu	21.2	13.2	Hokkaido Route 46 south – Nanporo, Kitahiroshima; Hokkaido Route 128 west – to Dō-Ō Expressway, National Route 275, Tōbetsu	Northern end of Hokkaido Route 46 concurrency
Ebetsu	22.7	14.1	Hokkaido Route 1056 west – to National Route 275, Tōbetsu	Southern end of Hokkaido Route 1056 concurrency
Ebetsu	25.7	16.0	Hokkaido Route 1056 west – Naganuma, Nanporo, Akebono	Northern end of Hokkaido Route 1056 concurrency
Ebetsu	27.0	16.8	National Route 337 (Dō-ōken Renraku Road) – to Dō-Ō Expressway, Otaru, Tōbetsu, Shinshinotsu, Naganuma, Nanporo	Interchange
Iwamizawa	34.9	21.7	Hokkaido Route 340 south – Kuriyama, Nanporo; Hokkaido Route 1121 north – Shinshinotsu, Kitamura	
Iwamizawa	38.3	23.8	Hokkaido Route 728 south – Kurisawa	
Iwamizawa	39.6	24.6	Hokkaido Route 81 north – Tōbetsu, Shinshinotsu, Kitamura	
Iwamizawa	40.5	25.2	Hokkaido Route 6 north – Iwamizawa Station	
Iwamizawa	41.0	25.5	Hokkaido Route 1139 south	
Iwamizawa	43.0	26.7	National Route 234 south – Tomakomai, Kuriyama; Hokkaido Route 687 north – Kitamura, Tsukigawa, Shinshinotsu	
Iwamizawa	45.6	28.3	Hokkaido Route 960 east	
Iwamizawa	45.8	28.5	Hokkaido Route 917 east – Iwamizawa Road Office	
Mikasa	50.2	31.2	Hokkaido Route 30 south – Kuriyama, Mikasa	
Bibai	52.1	32.4	Hokkaido Route 275 west – Tsukigata, Miyajima Swamp, Kitamura	
Bibai	52.4	32.6	Hokkaido Route 1140 east – Mikasa	
Bibai	60.8	37.8	Hokkaido Route 33 west – to National Route 275, Kamibibai, Tsukigata, Miyajima Swamp	
Bibai	61.7	38.3	Hokkaido Route 135 east – Tomei Park	
Bibai	65.6	40.8	Hokkaido Route 979 west – to National Route 275, Urausu	
Naie	71.2	44.2	Hokkaido Route 139 west – Urausu	
Naie	71.5	44.4	Hokkaido Route 529 east – Naie Station	Southern end of Hokkaido Route 529 concurrency
Naie	71.8	44.6	Hokkaido Route 529 east	Northern end of Hokkaido Route 529 concurrency
Naie	74.6	46.4	Hokkaido Route 114 north – to Dō-Ō Expressway, Kamisunagawa	
Sunagawa	78.6	48.8	Hokkaido Route 115 east – Utashinai, Kamisunagawa	
Sunagawa	80.3	49.9	Hokkaido Route 283 west – to National Route 275, Shintotsukawa; Hokkaido Route 627 east – Utashinai	
Sunagawa	82.5	51.3	Hokkaido Route 1027 east – to Dō-Ō Expressway, Utashinai	
Sunagawa	84.7	52.6	National Route 12 north (Takikawa Bypass) – Asahikawa, Fukagawa	
Takikawa	86.0	53.4	National Route 451 north (Takishin Bypass) – Shintotsukawa	
Takikawa	86.6	53.8	Hokkaido Route 203 west – Takikawa Station	
Takikawa	87.0	54.1	National Route 38 east (Higashi-Ōdōri) – to Dō-Ō Expressway, Furano; National Route 451 north – Hamamasu, Shintotsukawa	
Takikawa	90.6	56.3	National Route 12 south (Takikawa Bypass) – to Dō-Ō Expressway, Sapporo, Sunagawa	
Takikawa	94.9	59.0	Hokkaido Route 564 east – to National Route 38, Akabira	
Takikawa	95.1	59.1	Hokkaido Route 323 west – Ebeotsu Station	
Takikawa	96.3	59.8	Hokkaido Route 279 west – to National Route 275, Uryū	
Fukagawa	101.4	63.0	Hokkaido Route 94 north – to Fukagawa-Rumoi Expressway, Moseushi	
Fukagawa	108.9	67.7	National Route 233 west – to Fukagawa-Rumoi Expressway, Fukagawa Station, Rumoi; Hokkaido Route 79 east – to Dō-Ō Expressway	Southern end of National Route 233 concurrency
Fukagawa	114.5	71.1	Hokkaido Route 916 north – Osamunai Station	
Asahikawa	118.2	73.4	Hokkaido Route 4 south – Ashibetsu	
Asahikawa	119.4	74.2	Hokkaido Route 57 west – Rumoi, Fukagawa	
Asahikawa	130.9	81.3	National Route 12 north (Asahikawa Shindō) – to Dō-Ō Expressway, Kitami, Shibetsu	Northbound exit, southbound entrance
Asahikawa	131.2	81.5	Hokkaido Route 937 south – Kamiubun, Daibahigashi	
Asahikawa	133.5	83.0	Hokkaido Route 90 – Numata, Tadoshi, Furano, Asahikawa Airport	
Asahikawa	135.2	84.0	National Route 237 south (Takishin Bypass) – Furano, Biei, Asahikawa Airport	
Asahikawa	135.7	84.3	National Route 39 east (Yonjō-dōri) – Kitami, Kamikawa; National Route 40 north (Shōwa-dōri) – Nayoro, Shibetsu	Northern terminus; end of National Route 233 concurrency; highway continues east as National Route 39
1.000 mi = 1.609 km; 1.000 km = 0.621 mi: Concurrency terminus; Incomplete access; Route transition

== Auxiliary routes ==
=== Takikawa Bypass ===
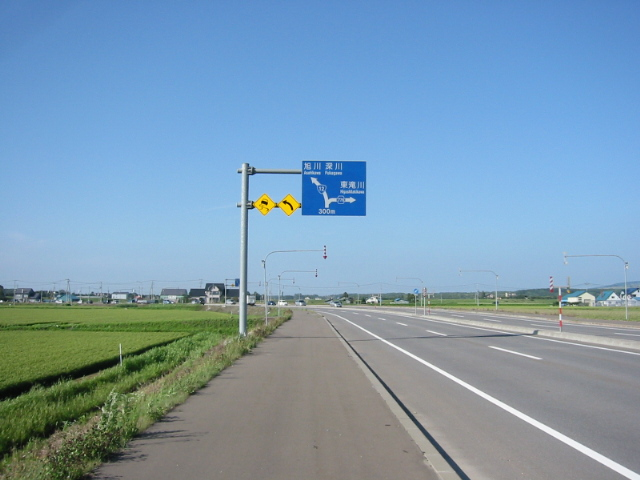
Takikawa Bypass northeast of central Takikawa

The Takikawa Bypass is a 6.3-kilometer-long (3.9 mi) auxiliary route of National Route 12 that travels to the east and north of the central district of Takikawa. From its southern terminus with its parent route, it heads north and crosses over the Sorachi River. It has a junction with National Route 38. After this junction the Takikawa Bypass travels northeast, paralleling the main line of National Route 12 until it reaches Hokkaido Route 776. From there it heads northwest towards its northern terminus at a junction with National Route 12.

=== Asahikawa Shindō ===
The Asahikawa Shindō is a 14.1-kilometer-long (8.8 mi) auxiliary route of National Route 12 that travels to the west and north of the central district of Asahikawa. From its southern terminus with its parent route, it heads north and crosses over the Ishikari River. After that it curves to the northeast and has a junction with the Dō-Ō Expressway. North of central Asahikawa the highway curves to the southeast. It meets National Route 40 just before crossing over the Ishikari River once more. The highway then meets its northern terminus at an intersection with National Route 39.
