= Dōtō Expressway =

Expressway in Hokkaido, Japan

Dōtō Expressway
- 道東自動車道

Route information
- Length: 258.0 km (160.3 mi)
- Existed: 1995–present

Major junctions
- From: Chitose-Eniwa Junction in Chitose, Hokkaido; Dō-Ō Expressway
- To: Kushiro, Hokkaido (town); Kitami, Hokkaido

Location
- Country: Japan
- Major cities: Yūbari, Obihiro, Kushiro

Highway system
- National highways of Japan; Expressways of Japan

The Dōtō Expressway (道東自動車道, Dōtō Jidōsha-dō, lit. "East Hokkaidō Expressway) is a 2-laned national expressway in Hokkaidō, Japan. It is owned and operated by East Nippon Expressway Company.

It forms the middle section of the Trans-Hokkaidō Expressway.

== Overview ==
The expressway is connects the east of Hokkaidō with central regions including the greater Sapporo urban area.

At Honbetsu Junction near the eastern end the expressway splits into two routes: one route heading east towards the city of Kushiro and another route heading north towards the city of Kitami. All future extensions of these two routes will be constructed according to the New Direct Control System and are expected to operate toll-free upon completion.

The expressway is among the least used in Japan. At the time of its opening it was used by an average of only 650 vehicles a day, the lowest among all national expressways in Japan. As of 2006 the average daily ridership of the expressway has increased to 4,751 vehicles (for comparison the figure for the Tōhoku Expressway is 270,546 vehicles).

The speed limit is 70 km/h for the entire route.

== List of interchanges and features ==
- IC - interchange, JCT - junction, SA - service area, PA - parking area, TN - tunnel, TB - toll gate

=== Kushiro Route ===
No.	Name	Connections	Dist. from Origin	Notes	Location (all in Hokkaidō)
(25)	Chitose-Eniwa JCT	Dō-Ō Expressway	0.0		Chitose
1	Chitose-higashi IC	National Route 337	12.6		Chitose
PA	Kiusu PA		14.5		Chitose
2	Oiwakechō IC	National Route 234	21.9		Abira
PA	Yuni PA		29.3		Yuni
3	Yūbari IC	National Route 274	42.1		Yūbari
4	Mukawa Hobetsu IC	Pref. Route 1165 (Mukawa Hobetsu Inter Route)	56.5		Mukawa
TN	Hobetsu Tunnel			Length - 4,332 m	Mukawa
5	Shimukappu IC	Pref. Route 1172 (Shimukappu Inter Route)	76.6		Shimukappu
PA	Shimukappu PA		80.0		Shimukappu
6	Tomamu IC	Pref. Route 1170 (Tomamu Inter Route)	102.8		Shimukappu
TN	Daiichi Karikachi Tunnel			Point of highest elevation among all expressways in Hokkaidō (626 m); Length - 2,351 m	Minamifurano
-	Shintoku IC			Planned	Shintoku
7	Tokachi Shimizu IC	National Route 274	123.7		Shimizu
SA	Tokachiheigen SA		138.6		Memuro
8	Memuro IC	Pref. Route 54 (Higashiurimaku Memuro Route)	140.9		Memuro
9	Obihiro JCT	Obihiro-Hiroo Expressway	145.3		Memuro
10	Otofuke Obihiro IC	National Route 241 (Obihiro Kita Bypass)	152.4		Otofuke
PA	Osarushi PA		165.5		Otofuke
11	Ikeda IC	National Route 242	174.0		Ikeda
TB	Ikeda Toll Gate				Ikeda
12	Honbetsu JCT	Kitami Route	191.2	No access: Ashoro IC ←→ Honbetsu IC	Honbetsu
13	Honbetsu IC	Pref. Route 1154 (Honbetsu Inter Route)	193.0		Honbetsu
14	Urahoro IC	National Route 274	201.0		Urahoro
<TN>	Sensho Tunnel			Length - 4,460 m	Urahoro
15	Shiranuka IC	National Route 392	227.0		Shiranuka
16	Shoro IC	Pref. Route 242 (Kami-Shoro Shoro Teishajō Route)	235.0		Shiranuka
17	Akan IC	National Route 240	240.9		Kushiro
17-1	Kushiro Airport IC	Pref. Route 952 (Yamahana Tsuruoka Route)	250.2		Kushiro
18	Kushiro-nishi IC	National Route 38 (Kushiro Shindō)	259.1		Kushiro
19	Kushiro-chuō IC	Kushiro City Route (Yanagibashi-dōri Avenue)	265.0	Nemuro-bound exit, Obihiro-bound entrance only	Kushiro
19	Kushiro-chuō IC	Kushiro City Route (Kyōeibashi-dōri Avenue)	266.1	Obihiro-bound exit, Nemuro-bound entrance only	Kushiro
20	Kushiro-higashi IC	National Route 391	268.8		Kushiro (town)
21	Kushiro-Beppo IC	National Route 272; Kushiro Nakashibetsu Road	275.9		Kushiro (town)
Through to Trans-Hokkaidō Expressway (Planned)

=== Kitami Route ===
No.	Name	Connections	Dist. from Origin	Notes	Location (all in Hokkaidō)
12	Honbetsu JCT	Kushiro Route	191.2	No access: Ashoro IC ←→ Honbetsu IC	Honbetsu
1	Ashoro IC	National Route 242	204.4		Ashoro
Through to Tokachi-Okhotsk Expressway (Planned)

== History ==
- October 30, 1995 - Tokachi Shimizu Interchange - Ikeda Interchange section opened.
- October 7, 1999 - Chitose-Eniwa Junction - Yūbari Interchange section opened.
- March 15, 2003 - Obihiro Junction is opened, connecting with the Obihiro-Hiroo Expressway.
- June 8, 2003 - Ikeda Interchange - Honbetsu Interchange section and Honbetsu Junction - Ashoro Interchange section opened.
- October 21, 2007 - Tomamu Interchange - Tokachi Shimizu Interchange section opened.
- October 24, 2009 - Shimukappu Interchange - Tomamu Interchange section opened.
- November 21, 2009 - Honbetsu Interchange - Urahoro Interchange section opened.
- October 29, 2011 - Yubari Interchange - Shimukappu Interchange section opened.
- March 29, 2015 - Urahoro Interchange - Shiranuka Interchange section opened.
- March 12, 2016 - Shiranuka Interchange - Akan Interchange and Kushiro-nishi Interchange - Kushiro-higashi Interchange section opened (as part of Kushiro Sotokan Road).
- March 9, 2019 - Kushiro-higashi Interchange - Kushiro-Beppo Interchange section opened (as part of Kushiro Sotokan Road).
- September 12, 2024 - Kushiro Sotokan Road renamed to Dōtō Expressway.
- December 22, 2024 - Akan Interchange - Kushiro-nishi Interchange section opened.

== See also ==
- Dō-Ō Expressway, another road on the island
