= Fukagawa-Rumoi Expressway =

Expressway in Sorachi and Rumoi, Hokkaido, Japan

Fukagawa-Rumoi Expressway
- 深川留萌自動車道
- The Fukagawa-Rumoi Expressway highlighted in red

Route information
- Maintained by East Nippon Expressway Company/Ministry of Land, Infrastructure, Transport and Tourism
- Length: 49.0 km (30.4 mi)
- Existed: 1998–present
- Component highways: National Route 233

Major junctions
- East end: Dō-Ō Expressway in Fukagawa, Hokkaido
- National Route 233; National Route 275
- West end: National Route 232 in Rumoi, Hokkaido

Location
- Country: Japan

Highway system
- National highways of Japan; Expressways of Japan

The Fukagawa-Rumoi Expressway (Japanese: 深川留萌自動車道, Hepburn: Fukagawa Rumoi Jidōsha-dō) is a partially tolled expressway in Sorachi Subprefecture and Rumoi Subprefecture, Hokkaido, Japan. The expressway connects Rumoi on the Sea of Japan coast of Hokkaido to the Dō-Ō Expressway in the central part of the island. It is owned and operated by partially by the East Nippon Expressway Company and the Ministry of Land, Infrastructure, Transport and Tourism (MLIT). It is signed as an auxiliary route of National Route 233 as well as E62 under their "2016 Proposal for Realization of Expressway Numbering.

== History ==
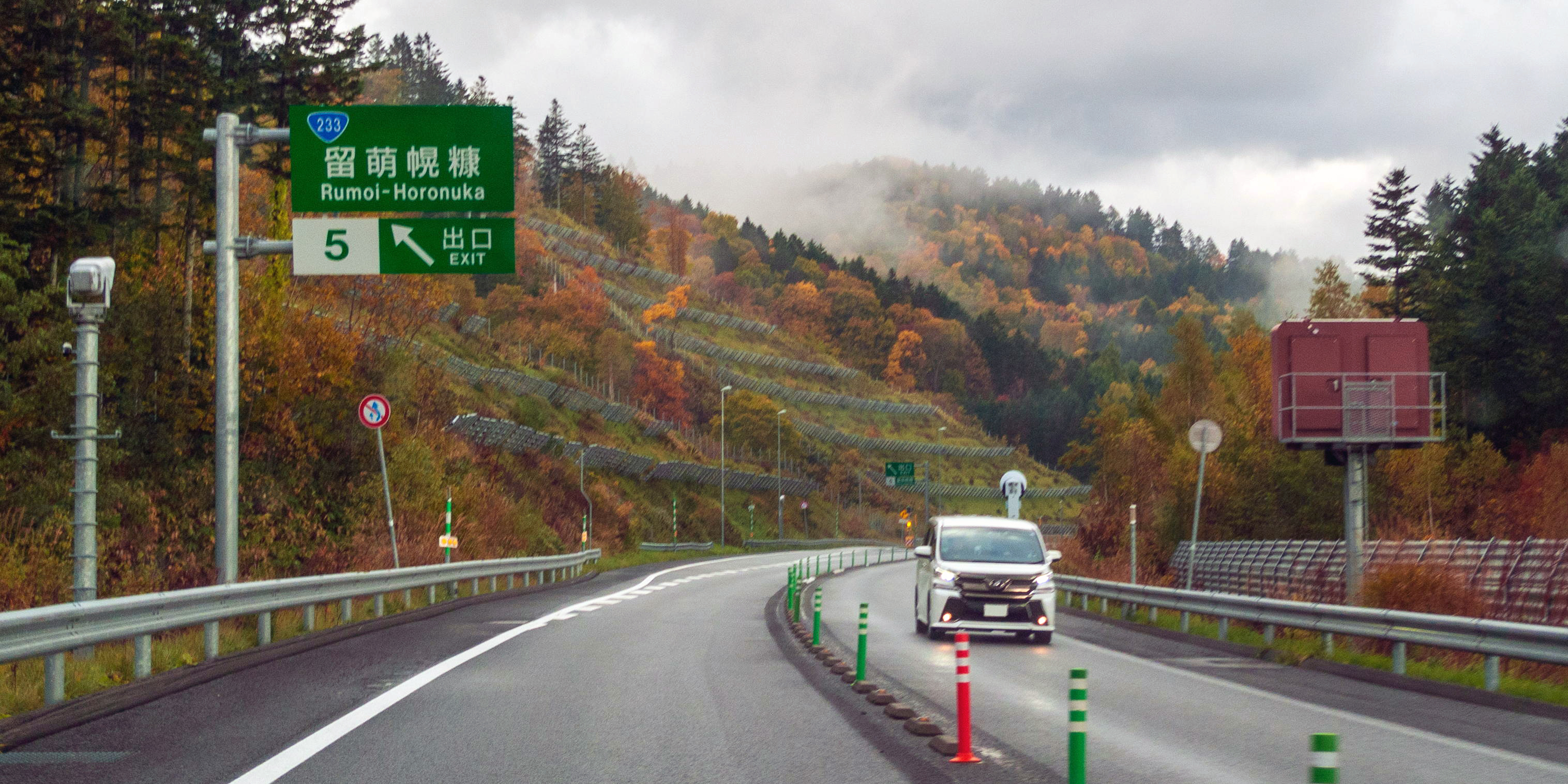
The Fukagawa-Rumoi Expressway at Rumoi-Horonuka Interchange

The first section of the Fukagawa-Rumoi Expressway to open was a 4.4-kilometer-long (2.7 mi) section between its eastern terminus at Fukagawa Junction on the Dō-Ō Expressway to Fukagawa-nishi Interchange on 11 April 1998. The expressway was completed with the extension of its route west from Rumoi-Owada Interchange to Rumoi Interchange on 28 March 2020.

== Junction list ==
The entire expressway is in Hokkaido.

Location	km	mi	Exit	Name	Destinations	Notes
Fukagawa	0	0.0	42/TB	Fukagawa	Dō-Ō Expressway – Asahikawa, Sapporo	Eastern terminus
Fukagawa	4.4	2.7	1	Fukagawa-nishi	Hokkaido Route 47 – Central Fukagawa, Moseushi	
Chippubetsu	11.6	7.2	2	Chippubetsu	National Route 233 – Fukagawa, Chippubetsu	
Chippubetsu	13.0	8.1	PA	Chippubetsu Parking Area		
Numata	20.0	12.4	3	Numata	National Route 275 – Central Numata, Hokuryū	
Hokuryū	27.0	16.8	4	Hokuryū-Himawari	National Route 233 – Hokuryū, Rumoi	
Rumoi	36.0	22.4	5	Rumoi-Horonuka	National Route 233 – Haboro, Central Rumoi, Fukagawa, Hekisui	
Rumoi	44.9	27.9	6	Rumoi-Owada	National Route 233 – Haboro, Central Rumoi, Fukagawa, Hekisui	Westbound exit, eastbound entrance
Rumoi	49.0	30.4	7	Rumoi	National Route 232 – to National Route 231, Mashike, Haboro, Central Rumoi, Obira	Western terminus
1.000 mi = 1.609 km; 1.000 km = 0.621 mi: Electronic toll collection; Incomplete access
