= Japan National Route 38 =

National highway in Japan

National Route 38
- 国道38号

Route information
- Length: 298.4 km (185.4 mi)
- Existed: 4 December 1952–present

Major junctions
- East end: National Route 12 / National Route 451 in Takikawa
- West end: National Route 44 in Kushiro

Location
- Country: Japan

Highway system
- National highways of Japan; Expressways of Japan
← National Route 37	→ National Route 39

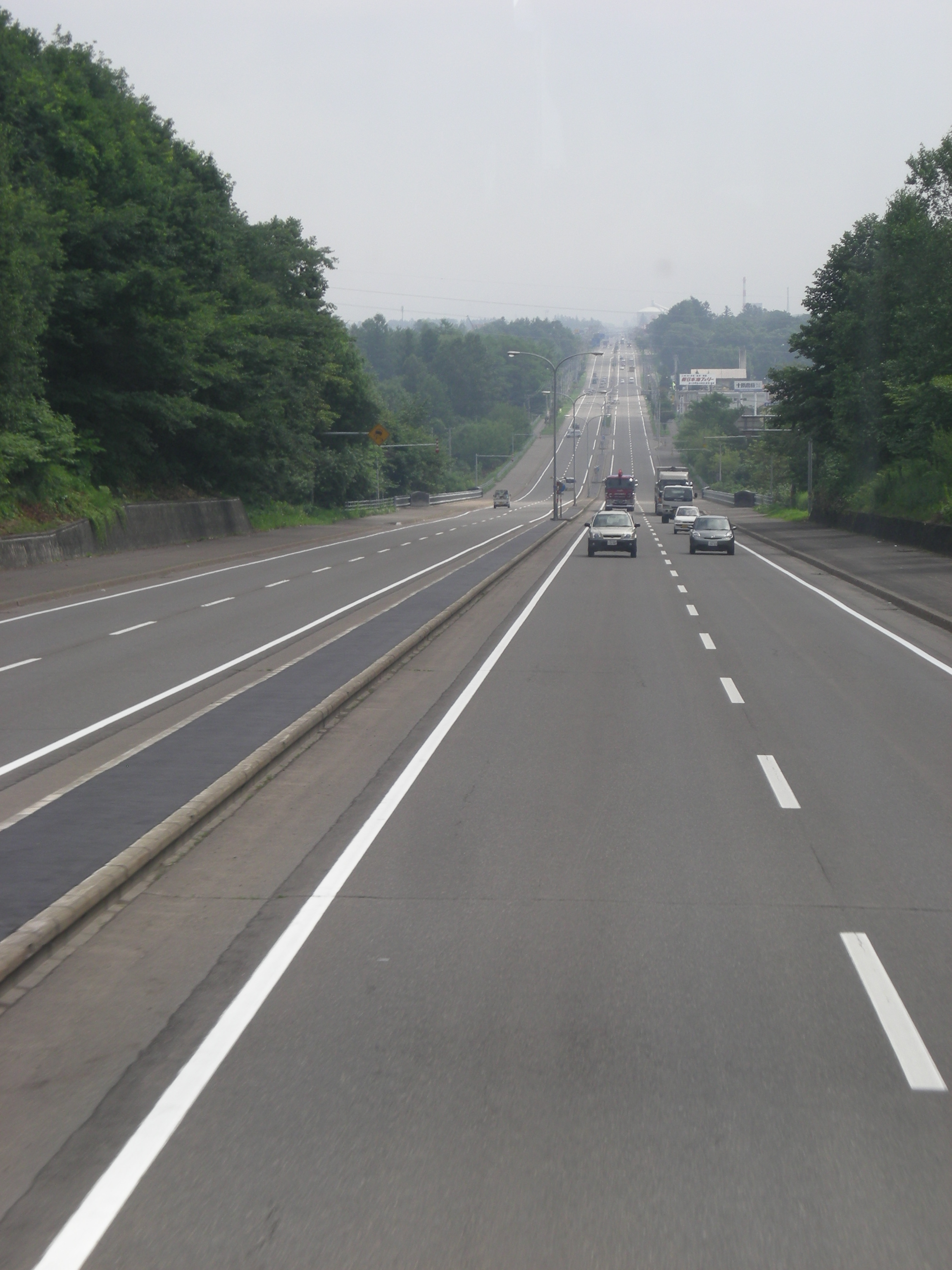

National Route 38 (国道38号, Kokudō sanjūhachi-gō) is a national highway connecting Takikawa and Kushiro in Hokkaidō, Japan.

== Route data ==
- Length: 298.4 km (185.5 mi)
- Origin: Takikawa (originates at junction with Routes 12 and 451)
- Terminus: Kushiro (ends at the origin of Route 44)
- Major cities: Ashibetsu, Furano, Obihiro

== History ==
- 1952-12-04 - First Class National Highway 38 (from Takikawa to Kushiro)
- 1965-04-01 - General National Highway 38 (from Takikawa to Kushiro)

== Overlapping sections ==
- In Ashibetsu, from North-2 West-1 South intersection to Ashibetsu-bashi intersection: Route 452
- In Frano, from Wakamatsu-cho 15 intersection to Higashiyama-yanagi intersection: Route 237
- In Shimizu, South-1-11 to South-4-11: Route 274
- From Obihiro (Odori North-1 intersection) to Makubetsu (Akeno intersection): Route 242
- From Urahoro (Yoshino-Kyoei intersection) to the terminus: Route 336
- From Shiranuka (West-1 South-2 intersection) to Kushiro (Otanoshike intersection): Route 392
- From Kushiro (Kitaodori-5 intersection) to the terminus: Routes 44, 272 and 391
