= Kushiro Sotokan Road =

Road in Japan

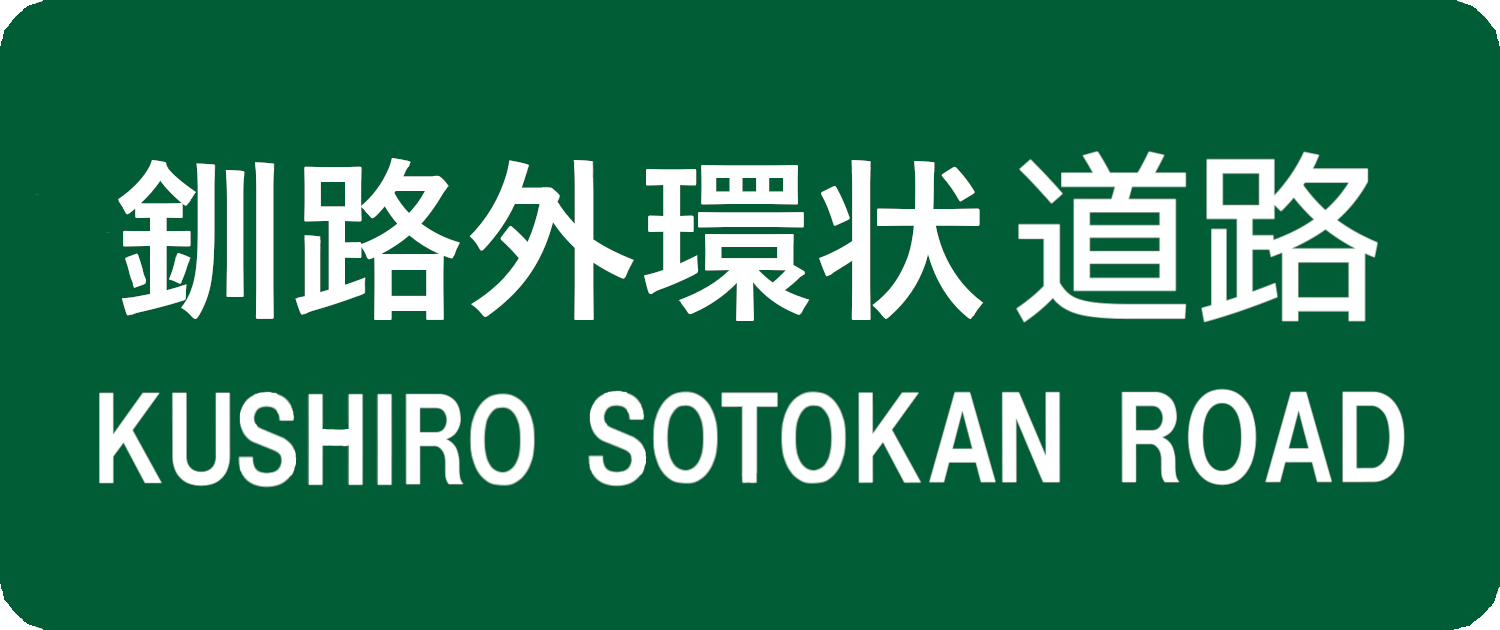
Kushiro Sotokan Road
- 国道%route%号
- 釧路外環状道路 (Kushiro-Sotokan Jōdōro)

Route information
- Maintained by Ministry of Land, Infrastructure, Transport and Tourism
- Length: 17.3 km (10.7 mi)
- Existed: 2016–present
- Component highways: National Route 38 / National Route 44

Major junctions
- West end: Kushiro-nishi Interchange; Hokkaido Route 148 in Kushiro
- East end: Kushirobeppo Interchange; National Route 272 in Kushiro

Location
- Country: Japan

Highway system
- National highways of Japan; Expressways of Japan

The Kushiro Sotokan Road (釧路外環状道路, Kushiro-Sotokan Jōdōro) is a two-lane national expressway in Kushiro Subprefecture, Hokkaido, Japan. As of July 2019, it connects the city Kushiro to the adjacent town that bears the same name. It is owned and operated by Ministry of Land, Infrastructure, Transport and Tourism and is signed as E38 and E44 under their "2016 Proposal for Realization of Expressway Numbering."

== Route description ==
The Kushiro Sotokan Road was built to reduce congestion along National Routes 38 and 44 through Kushiro and to build part of the larger Trans-Hokkaidō Expressway with plans to link it to the Dōtō Expressway.

The route has a total length of 16.8 kilometres (10.4 mi). Variable-message signs indicate the speed limit along the road, but the standard limit is 100 km/h.

== History ==
Kushiro Sotokan Road was opened in two stages. The first and largest stage was the construction of the road between Kushiro-nishi Interchange and Kushiro-higashi interchange. It was completed on 12 March 2016. The second stage extended the road east to its current eastern terminus at Kushirobeppo Interchange. This stage was completed on 9 March 2019.

== Junction list ==
The entire expressway is in Kushiro Subprefecture, Hokkaido. Distance markers reflect the distance traveled along the Dōtō Expressway from its terminus at Chitose-Eniwa Junction with the Hokkaido Expressway.

Location	km	mi	Exit	Name	Destinations	Notes
Through to Dōtō Expressway (under construction)
Kushiro	258.6	160.7	18	Kushiro-nishi	Hokkaido Route 148	At-grade junction; western terminus
Kushiro	265.0 266.1	164.7 165.3	19	Kushiro-chūō	Yanagibashi Avenue – Central Kushiro	
Kushiro (town)	268.8	167.0	20	Kushiro-higashi	National Route 391 to National Route 44 – Teshikaga, Shibecha	East end of E38, west end of E44
Kushiro (town)	275.9	171.4	21	Kushirobeppo	National Route 272 to National Route 44 – Shibetsu, Nemuro	At-grade junction; eastern terminus
Through to Trans-Hokkaidō Expressway (planned)
1.000 mi = 1.609 km; 1.000 km = 0.621 mi: Route transition
