= E38 =

E38 or E-38 may refer to:

- BMW E38, a BMW 7 Series automobile
- HMS E38, a 1916 British E class submarine
- Hikarigaoka Station or E-38, a Tokyo Toei Ōedo Line railway station
- Nimzo-Indian Defence or E38, a chess opening
- Alpine–Casparis Municipal Airport, an airport in Texas having the FAA LID code of E38.
- European route E38 in Ukraine, Russia and Kazakhstan
- Dōtō Expressway (main route) and Kushiro Sotokan Road (between Kushiro-nishi IC and Kushiro-higashi IC), route E38 in Japan
- SMART Tunnel, route E38 in Malaysia
