= Takikawa Station =

Railway station in Takikawa, Hokkaido, Japan

Coordinates: 43.5551614°N 141.9013077°E

Takikawa Station 滝川駅
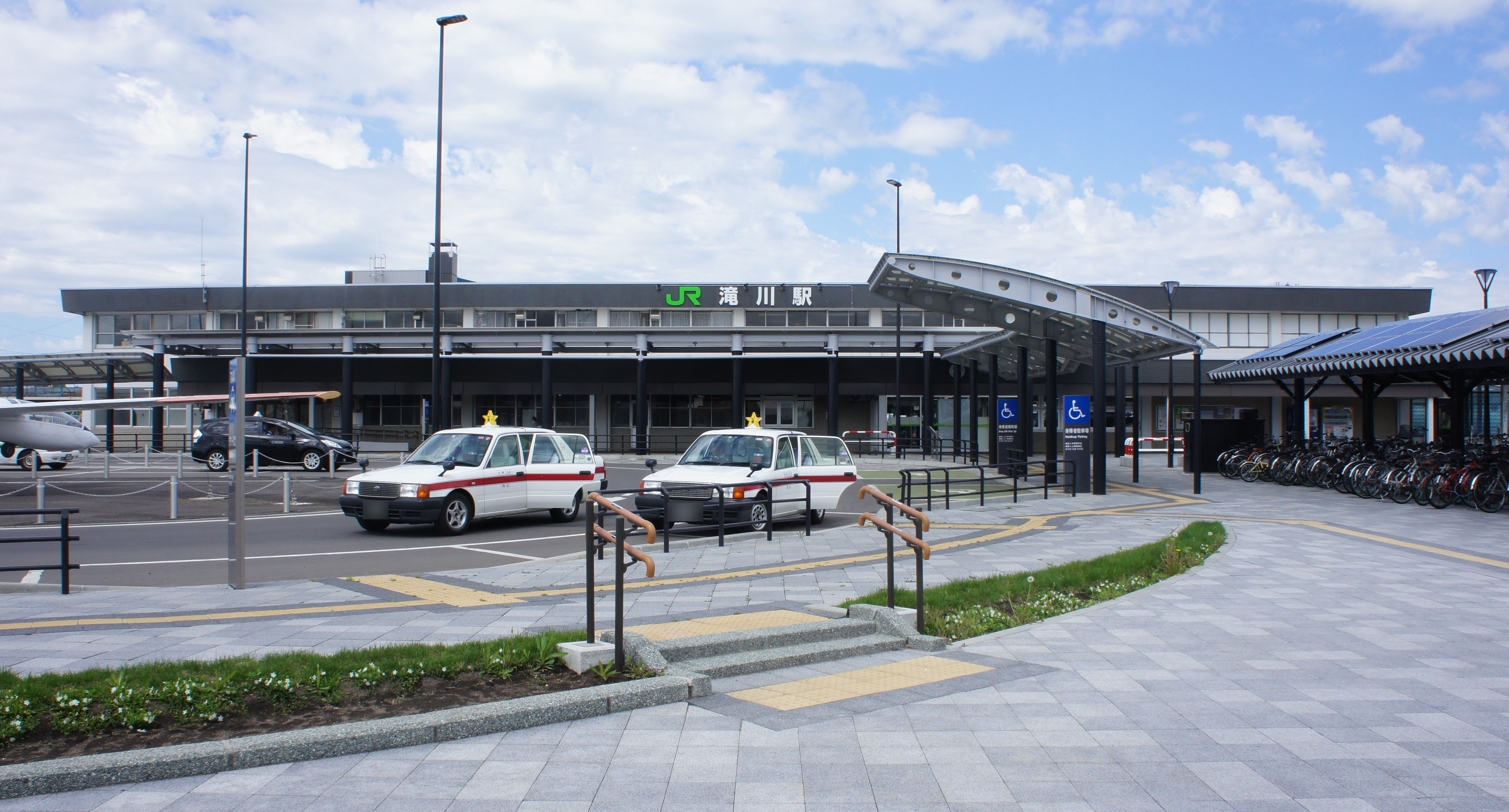
- Takikawa Station in May 2018

General information
- Location: Takikawa, Hokkaido; Japan
- Operator: JR Hokkaido
- Lines: Hakodate Main Line; Nemuro Main Line
- Distance: 369.8 km (229.8 mi) from Hakodate
- Platforms: 1 side platform and 2 island platforms
- Tracks: 5
- Connections: Bus stop

Construction
- Structure type: At grade

Other information
- Status: Staffed
- Station code: A21
- Website: Official website

History
- Opened: 16 July 1898; 128 years ago

Passengers
- FY2014: 1,669 daily

Services
Preceding station	JR Hokkaido	Following station
Local
Sunagawa towards Hakodate	Hakodate Main Line Local	Ebeotsu towards Asahikawa
Terminus	Nemuro Main Line Local	Akabira towards Nemuro
Limited Express
Iwamizawa towards Sapporo	Sōya	Fukagawa towards Wakkanai
Sunagawa towards Sapporo	Kamui	Fukagawa towards Asahikawa
Sunagawa towards Sapporo	Lilac	Fukagawa towards Asahikawa
Sunagawa towards Sapporo	Okhotsk	Fukagawa towards Abashiri
Location
- Location within Hokkaido Location within Japan

Takikawa Station (滝川駅, Takikawa-eki) is a railway station in Takikawa, Hokkaido, Japan, operated by the Hokkaido Railway Company (JR Hokkaido).

== Lines ==
Takikawa Station is served by the Hakodate Main Line and Nemuro Main Line. The station is numbered "A21".

== Station layout ==
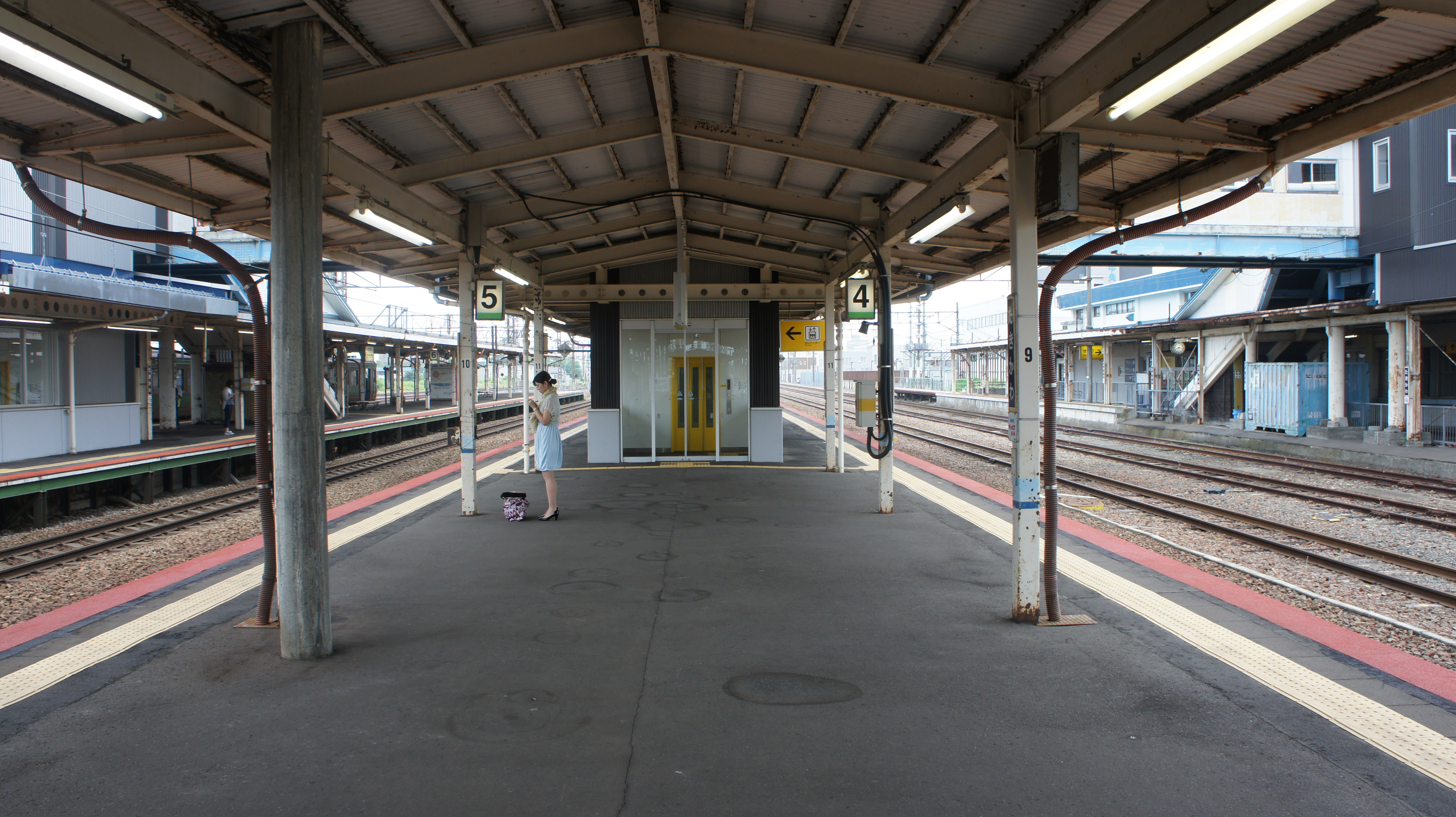
Overview of the station in July 2017

The station consists of three ground level platforms serving five tracks. The station has automated ticket machines, automated turnstiles and a "Midori no Madoguchi" staffed ticket office. The Kitaca farecard cannot be used at this station.

=== Platforms ===
1	■ Nemuro Main Line	for Furano, Shintoku, and Obihiro
4	■ Hakodate Main Line	for Iwamizawa and Sapporo (Local services)
5	■ Hakodate Main Line	for Iwamizawa and Sapporo (Limited express services)
6	■ Hakodate Main Line	for Asahikawa, Abashiri, and Wakkanai (Limited express services)
7	■ Hakodate Main Line	for Fukagawa and Asahikawa (Local services)

== History ==
The station opened on 16 July 1898. With the privatization of Japanese National Railways (JNR) on 1 April 1987, the station came under the control of JR Hokkaido.

== Surrounding area ==
- Takikawa Bus Terminal
- National Route 12
- National Route 38
- National Route 451
- Takikawa City Hall
- Takikawa Police Station
- Takikawa Post Office
- Hokkaido Takikawa Nishi High School
- Hokkaido Takikawa High School
- Hokkaido Takikawa Kogyo High School
- Ishikari River
