= Yurigahara Station =

Railway station in Sapporo, Japan

Coordinates: 43.1314°N 141.3605°E

Yurigahara Station 百合が原駅
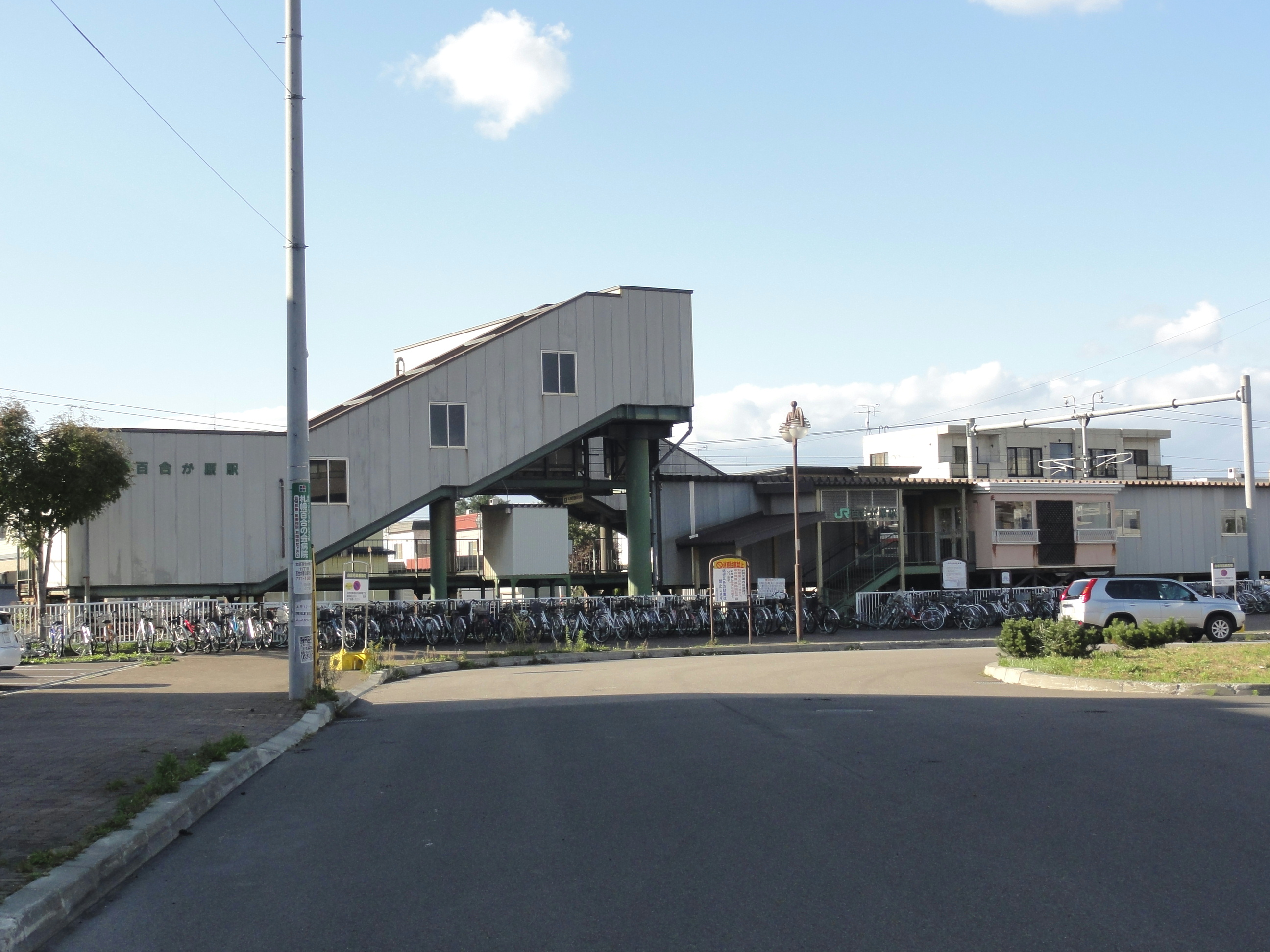

General information
- Location: Kita-ku, Sapporo, Hokkaido; Japan
- Operator: JR Hokkaido
- Line: Sasshō Line
- Distance: 8.6 km (5.3 mi) from Sōen
- Platforms: 2 side platforms
- Tracks: 2

Construction
- Structure type: At grade

Other information
- Status: Unstaffed
- Station code: G07

History
- Opened: 28 June 1986; 40 years ago

Passengers
- FY2014: 760 daily

Services
Preceding station	JR Hokkaido	Following station
Taihei towards Sapporo	Sasshō Line	Shinoro towards Hokkaidō-Iryōdaigaku
Location
- Location within Hokkaido Location within Japan

Yurigahara Station (百合が原駅, Yurigahara-eki) is a railway station on the Sasshō Line in Kita-ku, Sapporo, Hokkaido, Japan, operated by the Hokkaido Railway Company (JR Hokkaido). The station is numbered G07.

== Lines ==
Yurigahara Station is served by the Sasshō Line (Gakuen Toshi Line) from Sapporo to Hokkaidō-Iryōdaigaku.

== Station layout ==
The station has two side platforms serving two tracks, connected by a passenger footbridge. The station has automated ticket machines and Kitaca card readers. The station is unattended.

== History ==
Electric services commenced from 1 June 2012, following electrification of the line between Sapporo and Hokkaidō-Iryōdaigaku.

== Surrounding area ==
- National Route 231 (to Rumoi)
- Yurigahara Park
- Taihei Yurigahara Community Center
- Kita Police Station, Taihei
- Sapporo Taihei Post Office
- Akatsuki Transportation Office

== See also ==
- List of railway stations in Japan
