= E62 =

E62 may refer to:

- European route E62
- King's Indian Defence, Encyclopaedia of Chess Openings code
- Fukagawa-Rumoi Expressway, route E62 in Japan

== See also ==
- Nokia E61
