= Otofuke, Hokkaido =

Town in Japan

Otofuke 音更町 Otofuke-chō
- Town
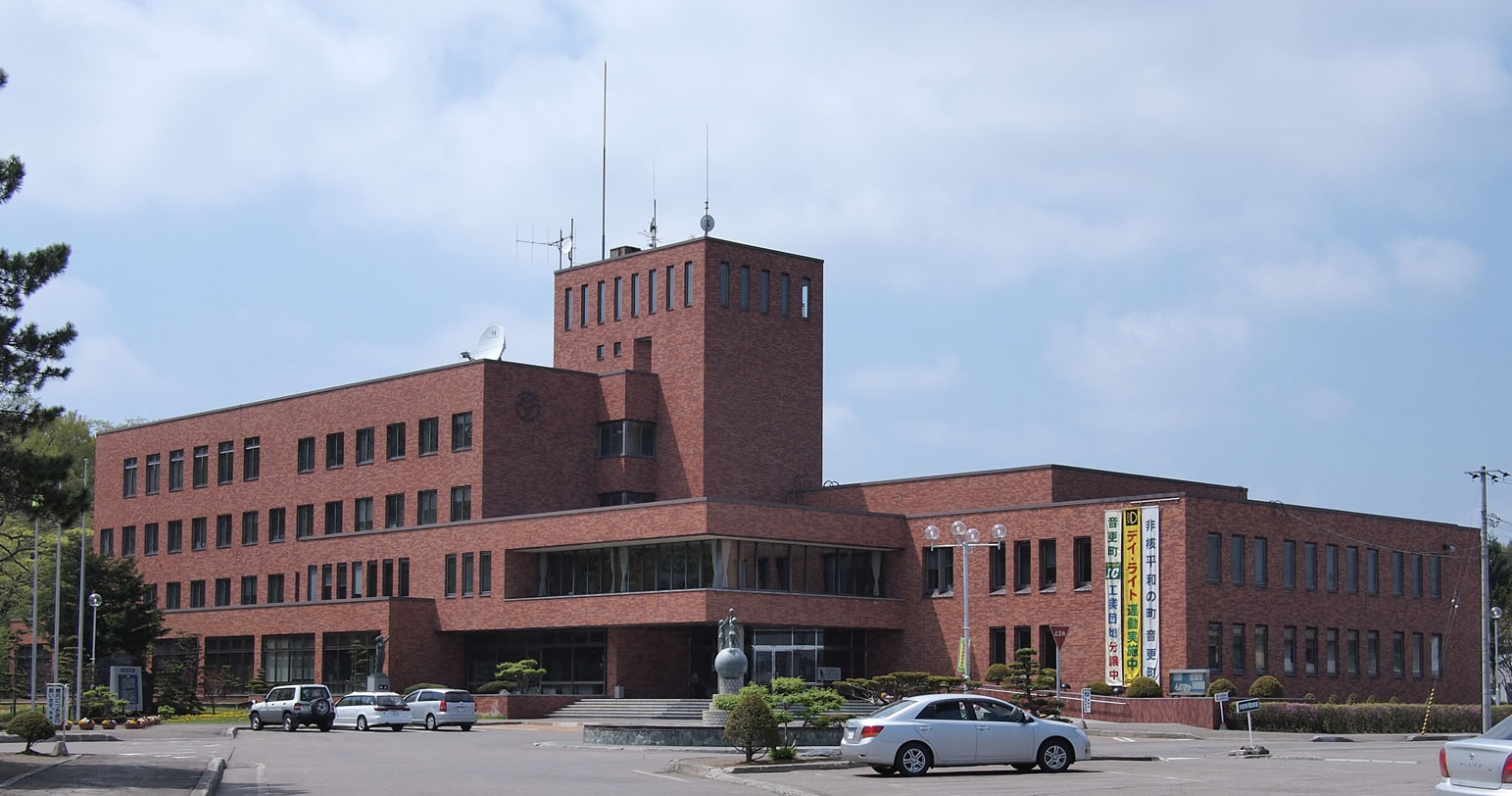
- Otofuke Town Hall

- Flag Emblem

- Location of Otofuke in Hokkaido (Tokachi Subprefecture)
- Interactive map of Otofuke
- Coordinates: 42°59′39″N 143°11′53″E
- Country: Japan
- Region: Hokkaido
- Prefecture: Hokkaido (Tokachi Subprefecture)
- District: Katō

Area
  - Total: 466.02 km^{2} (179.93 sq mi)

Population (December 31, 2025)
  - Total: 42,240
  - Density: 90.64/km^{2} (234.8/sq mi)
- Time zone: UTC+09:00 (JST)
- City hall address: 2 Motomachi, Otofuke-cho, Kato-gun, Hokkaido 080-0198
- Climate: Dfb
- Website: www.town.otofuke.hokkaido.jp
- Symbols
- Flower: Lily of the valley
- Tree: Japanese white birch

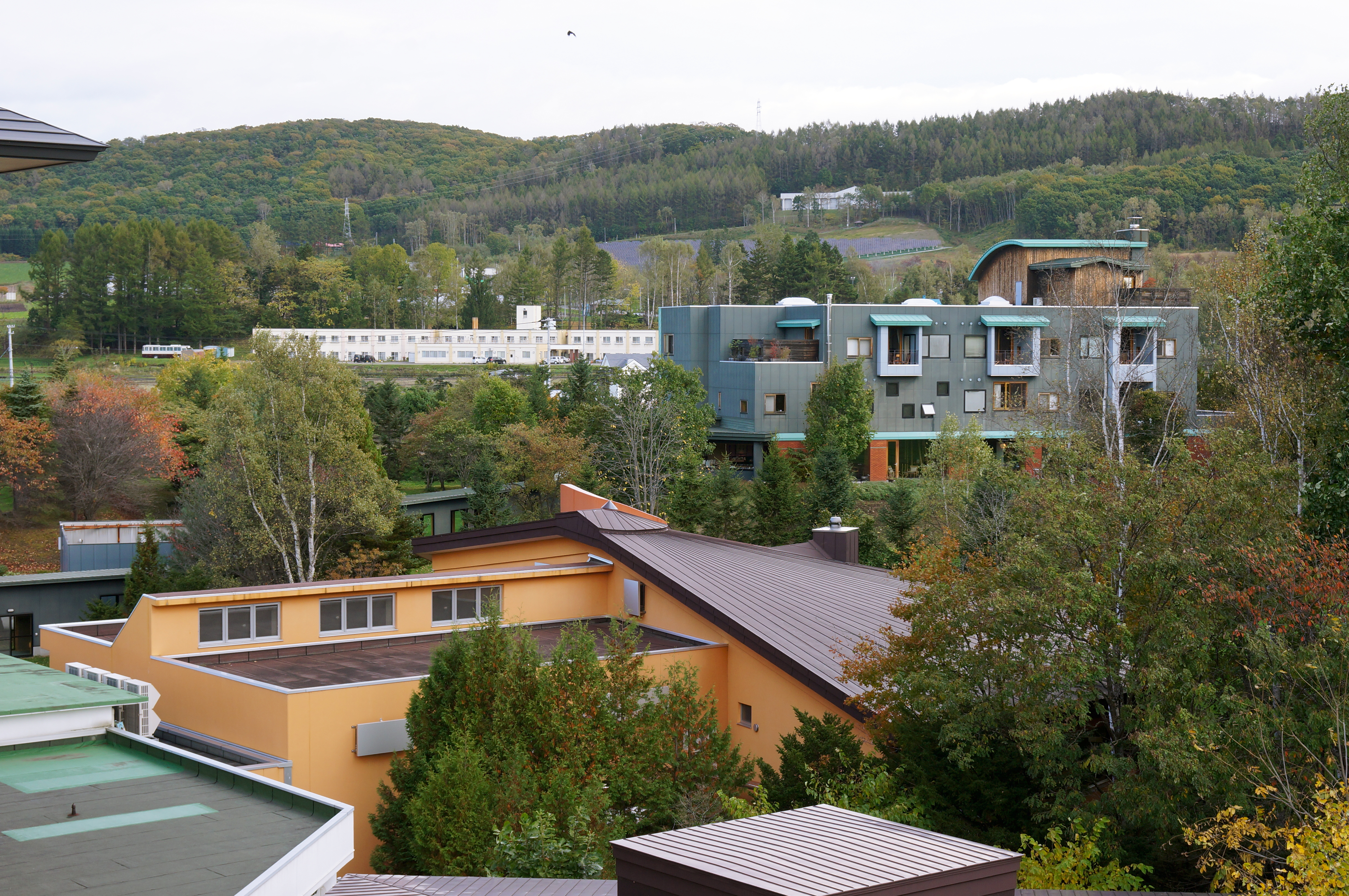
Tokachigawa Onsen

Otofuke (音更町, Otofuke-chō) is a town located in Tokachi Subprefecture, Hokkaidō, Japan. As of 31 December 2025, the town had an estimated population of 42,240 in 20,993 households, and a population density of 91 people per km^{2}. The total area of the town is 466.02 km^{2} (179.93 sq mi).

== Geography ==
Otofuke is located in southeastern Hokkaido almost in the center of the Tokachi Plain, it borders Obihiro and Makubetsu across the Tokachi River to the south. The town is mostly flat except for the Nagareshimanai Hills running north and south in the eastern part of the town, with the Otofuke River at its center and the Shihoro River and Shikaribetsu River flowing from north to south, both of which empty into the Tokachi River.

=== Neighboring municipalities ===
- Obihiro
- Urahoro
- Shikaori
- Memuro
- Makubetsu
- Ikeda

=== Climate ===
According to the Köppen climate classification, Otofuke has a humid continental climate. It has large temperature differences, including large annual and daily temperature ranges. It receives a lot of snow, and is designated as a heavy snow area. In winter, temperatures below -25 °C are not uncommon, making it extremely cold.

Climate data for 音更町駒場（駒場地域気象観測所）
Month	Jan	Feb	Mar	Apr	May	Jun	Jul	Aug	Sep	Oct	Nov	Dec	Year
Record high °C (°F)	6.6 (43.9)	11.0 (51.8)	16.7 (62.1)	29.8 (85.6)	37.7 (99.9)	37.8 (100.0)	38.2 (100.8)	36.2 (97.2)	33.1 (91.6)	28.9 (84.0)	20.8 (69.4)	13.1 (55.6)	38.2 (100.8)
Mean daily maximum °C (°F)	−2.3 (27.9)	−1.2 (29.8)	3.6 (38.5)	11.2 (52.2)	17.4 (63.3)	20.7 (69.3)	23.8 (74.8)	24.9 (76.8)	21.4 (70.5)	15.2 (59.4)	7.5 (45.5)	0.2 (32.4)	11.9 (53.4)
Daily mean °C (°F)	−8.1 (17.4)	−7.2 (19.0)	−1.6 (29.1)	5.0 (41.0)	10.9 (51.6)	14.7 (58.5)	18.4 (65.1)	19.6 (67.3)	16.0 (60.8)	9.4 (48.9)	2.6 (36.7)	−4.6 (23.7)	6.3 (43.3)
Mean daily minimum °C (°F)	−15.6 (3.9)	−15.2 (4.6)	−7.8 (18.0)	−1.0 (30.2)	4.5 (40.1)	9.5 (49.1)	14.1 (57.4)	15.3 (59.5)	10.9 (51.6)	3.5 (38.3)	−2.5 (27.5)	−10.7 (12.7)	0.4 (32.7)
Record low °C (°F)	−32.1 (−25.8)	−30.9 (−23.6)	−26.9 (−16.4)	−14.7 (5.5)	−5.5 (22.1)	−1.0 (30.2)	1.9 (35.4)	3.7 (38.7)	−0.8 (30.6)	−5.7 (21.7)	−18.1 (−0.6)	−25.9 (−14.6)	−32.1 (−25.8)
Average precipitation mm (inches)	27.2 (1.07)	19.9 (0.78)	32.3 (1.27)	51.1 (2.01)	79.0 (3.11)	78.6 (3.09)	116.9 (4.60)	148.9 (5.86)	131.2 (5.17)	77.0 (3.03)	45.1 (1.78)	38.7 (1.52)	845.9 (33.30)
Average precipitation days (≥ 1.0 mm)	4.9	4.3	6.1	7.7	9.5	9.8	10.8	11.9	10.9	8.7	7.3	6.2	98.1
Mean monthly sunshine hours	175.7	176.5	212.0	188.4	183.3	143.1	119.2	123.9	145.8	172.4	159.5	160.9	1,956.7

=== Demographics ===
Per Japanese census data, Otofuke's population has been growing since the late 1960s. It is now a commuter town for Obihiro.

Historical population
Year	Pop.	±%
1970	24,118	—
1980	31,134	+29.1%
1990	33,977	+9.1%
2000	39,201	+15.4%
2010	45,104	+15.1%
2020	43,576	−3.4%

== History ==
The village of Otafuke was established in 1905. It was raised to town status in 1953

== Government ==
Otofuke has a mayor-council form of government with a directly elected mayor and a unicameral town council of 10 members. Otofuke, as part of Tokachi Subprefecture, contributes four members to the Hokkaidō Prefectural Assembly. In terms of national politics, the town is part of the Hokkaidō 11th district of the lower house of the Diet of Japan.

== Economy ==
Although increasing a commuter town for Obihiro, the local economy of Otofuke is still agricultural. Otofuke Town's main industry is agriculture. The main crops are wheat, sugar beets, potatoes, beans, and vegetables, and dairy farming.

== Education ==
Otofuke has 11 public elementary schools and five public middle schools operated by the town. The town has one public high school operated by the Hokkaido Board of Education. A private junior college, the Obihiro Otani Junior College is located in Otofuke.

== Transportation ==
=== Railways ===
Since the abolition of the JR Hokkaido Shihoro Line in 1987, Ofofuke has not had any passenger railway services. The nearest train station is Obihiro Station on the Nemuro Main Line.

=== Highways ===
- Dōtō Expressway
- National Route 241

== Local attractions ==
- Tokachigawa Onsen
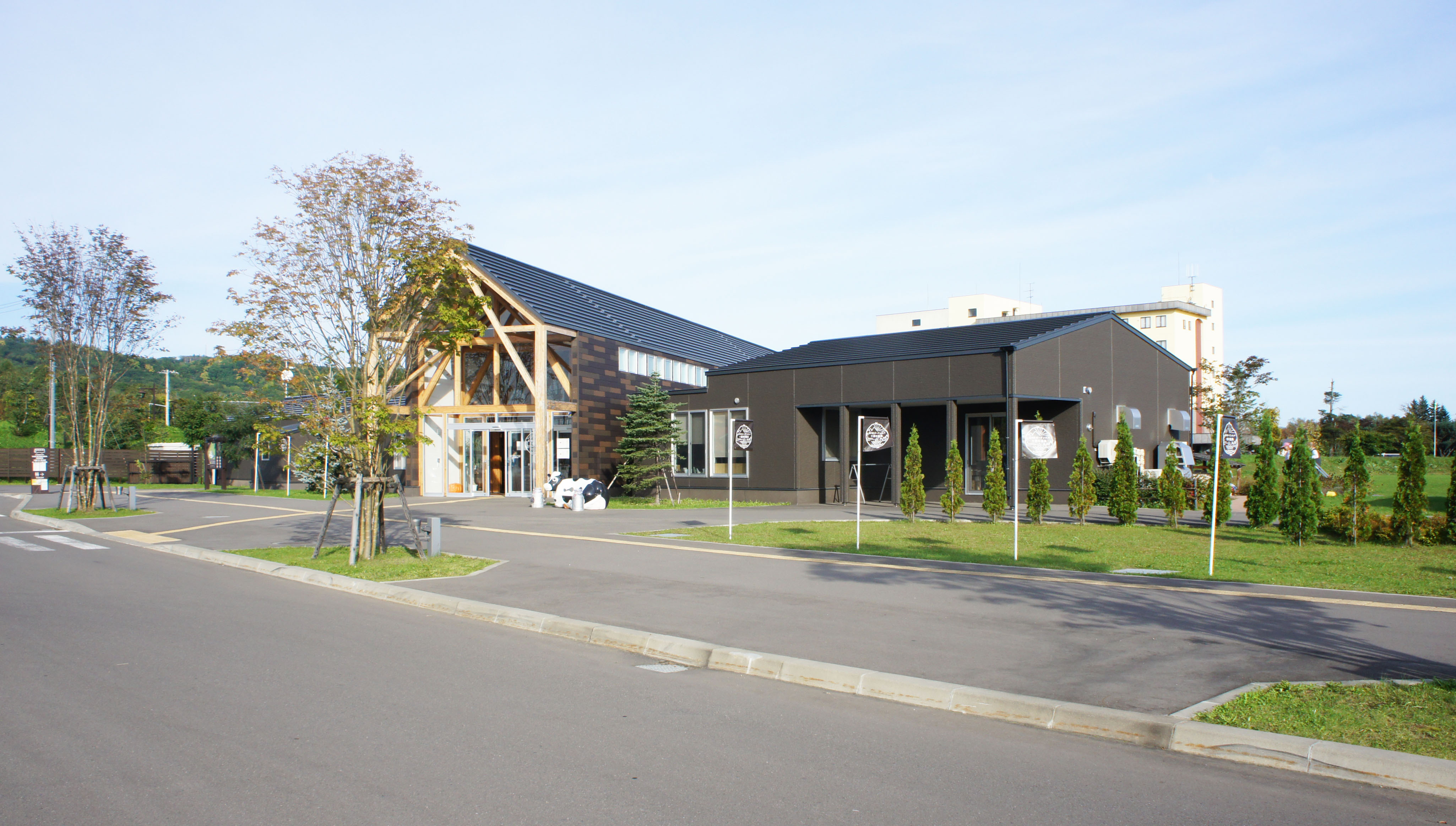
Michinoeki Garden Spa Tokachigawa Onsen

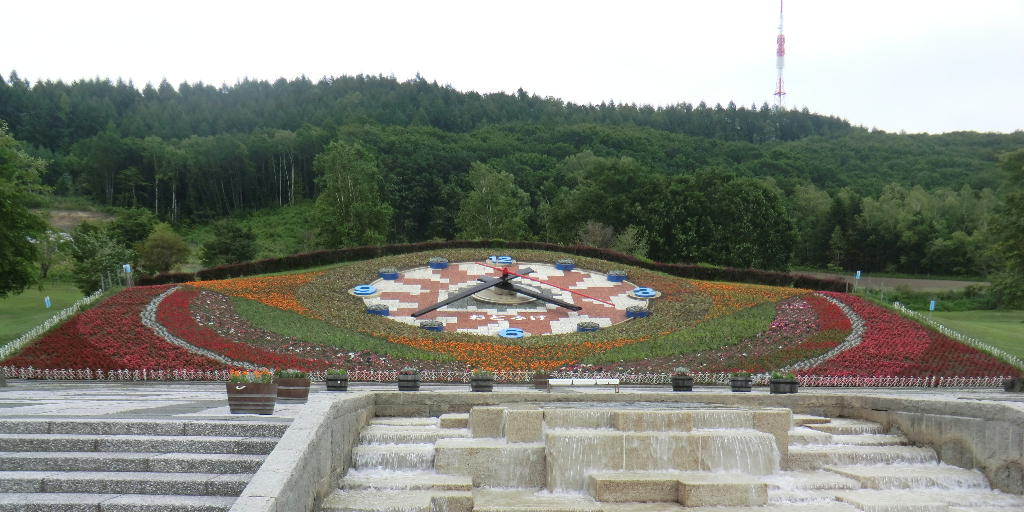
Tokachigaoka park

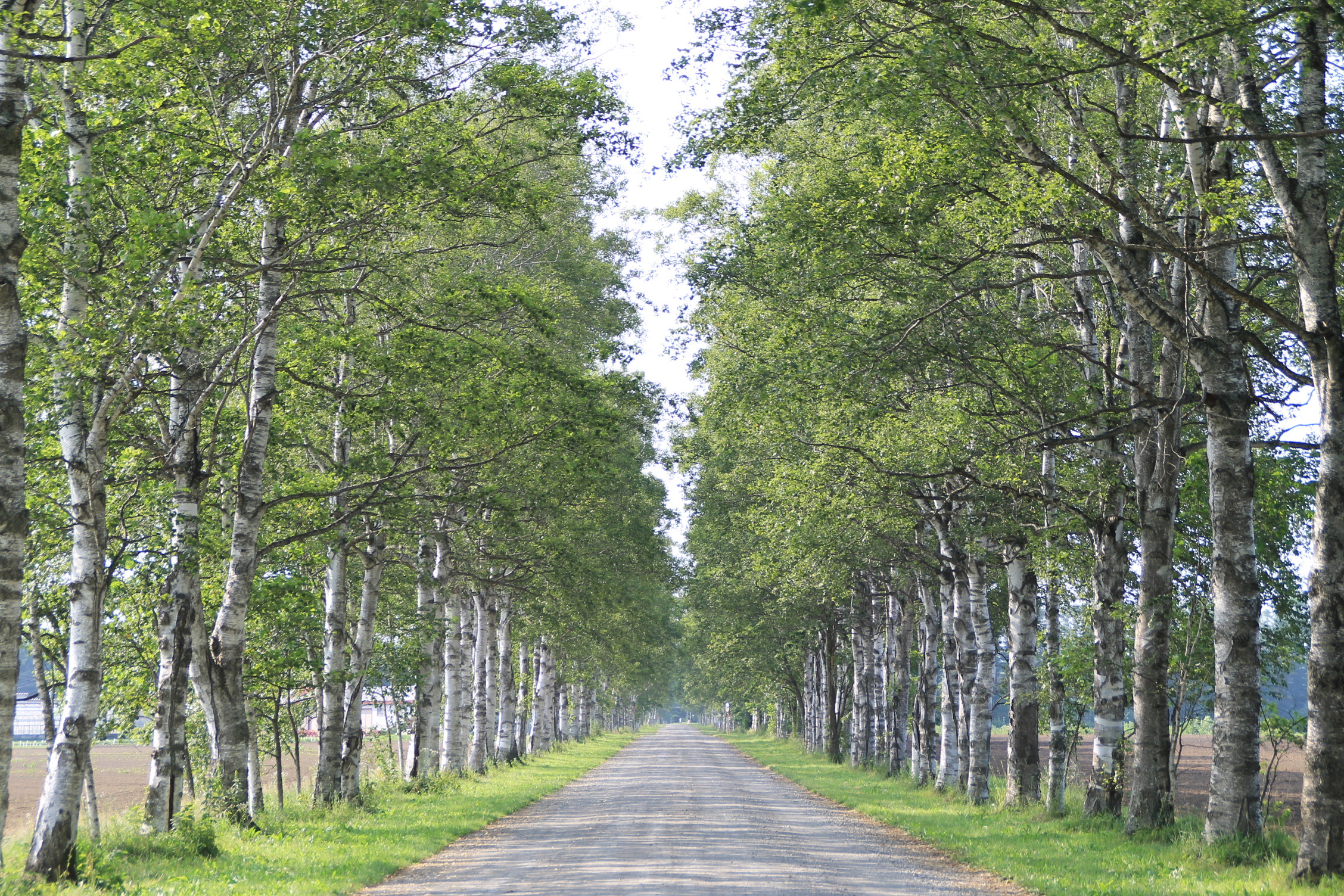
Road in Otofuke

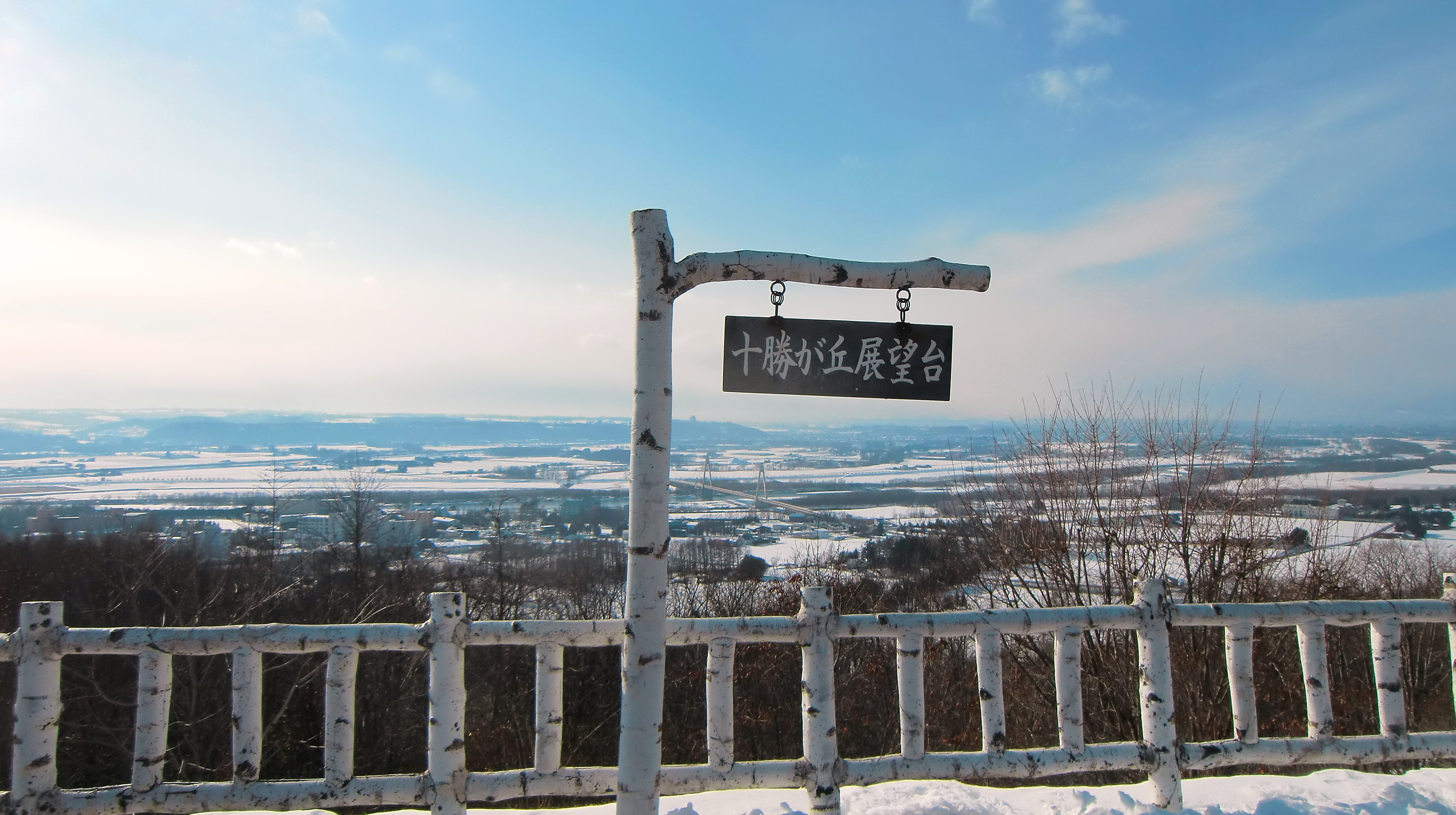
View from Tokachi-gaoka

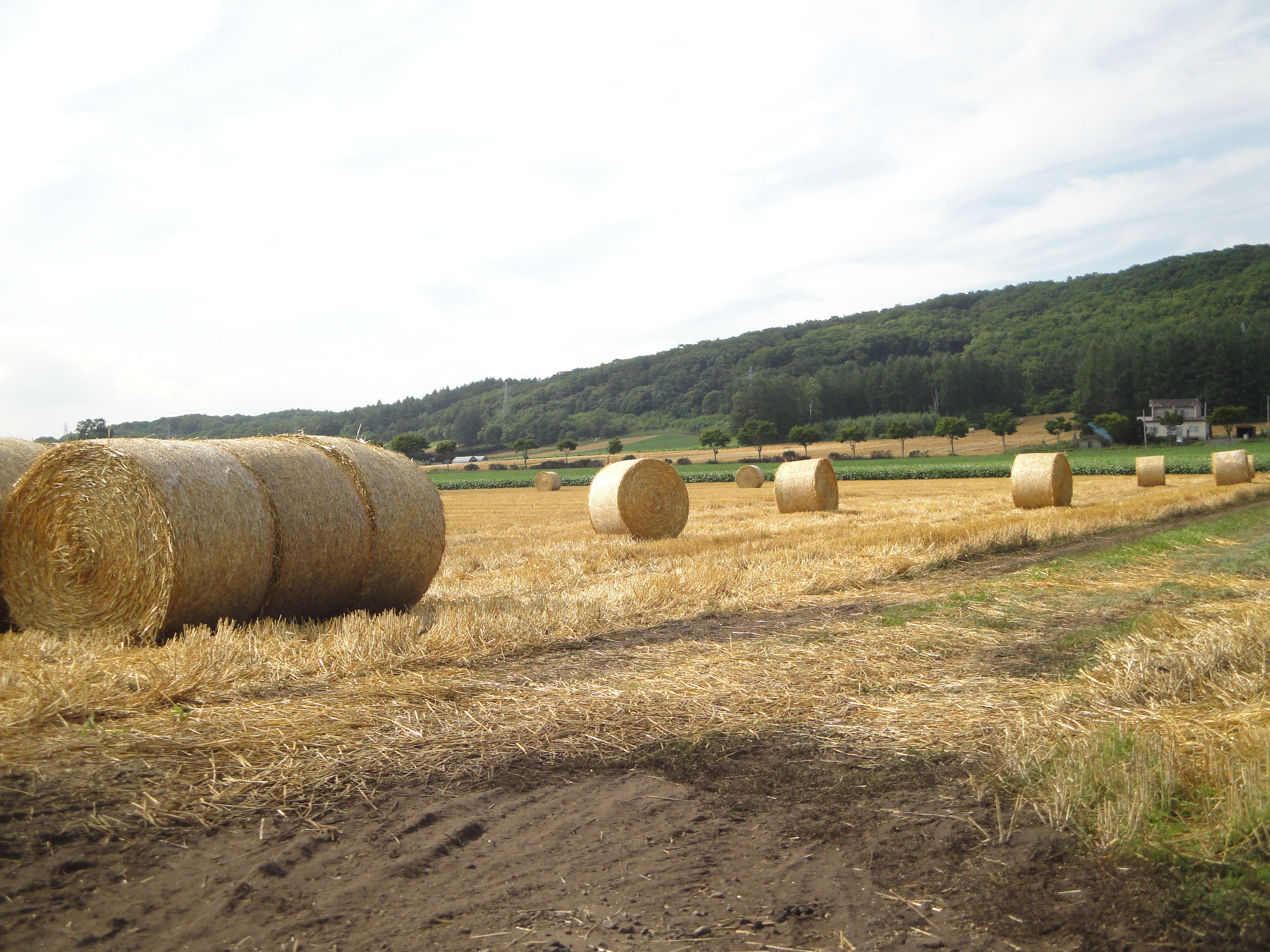
Rural panorama in Otofuke

== Notable people from Otofuke ==
- Akira Ifukube, composer
- Takahiro Nishikawa, musician
- Fujinokawa Takeo, sumo wrestler
