= Japan National Route 44 =

National highway in Japan

National Route 44
- 国道44号
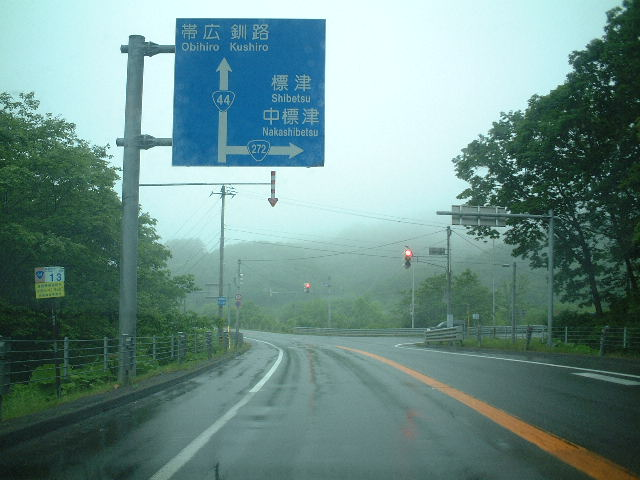

Route information
- Length: 124.8 km (77.5 mi)
- Existed: 1 April 1963–present

Major junctions
- West end: National Route 38 in Kushiro
- East end: Prefectural Route 35/310/313 in Nemuro

Location
- Country: Japan

Highway system
- National highways of Japan; Expressways of Japan
← National Route 43	→ National Route 45

National Route 44 (国道44号, Kokudō yonjūyon-gō) is the easternmost of the national highways of Japan. It connects the cities of Kushiro and Nemuro in eastern part of the island and prefecture of Hokkaido in northern Japan.

== Route description ==
- Length: 124.8 kilometers (77.5 mi)
- Origin: Kushiro (originates at the terminus of Route 38)
- Terminus: Nemuro
- Major cities: Akkeshi

== History ==
Route 44 was originally designated on 18 May 1953 as National Route 242, and this was redesignated as Route 44 when the route was promoted to a Class 1 highway.

=== Overlapping sections ===
- From the origin to Kitaodori 5-chome intersection, Kushiro City: Route 38
- From the origin to Kiba 3-chome intersection, Kushiro City: Route 391
- From the origin to Beppo intersection, Kushiro Town: Route 272

== History ==
- 18 May 1953 - Second Class National Highway 242 (from Kushiro to Nemuro)
- 1 April 1963 - First Class National Highway 44 (from Kushiro to Nemuro)
- 1 April 1965 - General National Highway 44 (from Kushiro to Nemuro)

== Sources ==
- Kenji Asai (2001). 道と路がわかる辞典 [Dictionary of Roads and Paths] (in Japanese). Nippon Jitsugyo Publishing. ISBN 4-534-03315-X.
