= Obihiro Otani Junior College =

Coordinates: 42.9893°N 143.196°E

Obihiro Otani Junior College (帯広大谷短期大学, Obihiro ōtani tanki daigaku) is a private junior college in Otofuke, Hokkaido, Japan, established in 1960.
