= Kita-Ichiyan Station =

Railway station in Fukagawa, Hokkaido, Japan

Coordinates: 43.7419°N 142.0145°E

Kita-Ichiyan Station 北一已駅
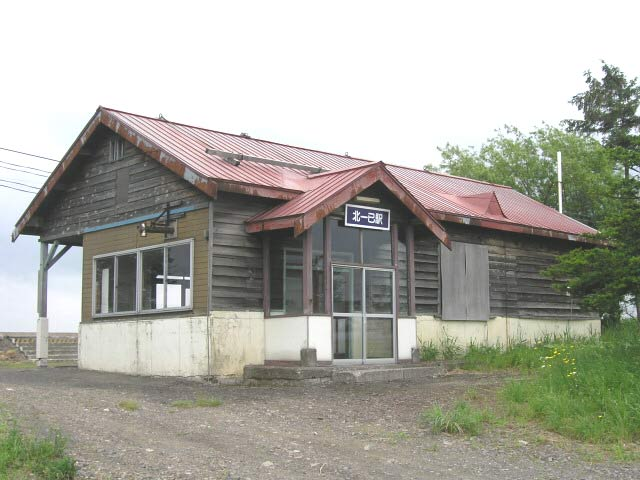
- The station building in 2004

General information
- Location: Fukagawa, Hokkaidō, Japan; Japan
- Operator: Hokkaido Railway Company
- Line: Rumoi Main Line
- Platforms: 1 Side platform
- Tracks: 1

Construction
- Structure type: At-grade
- Accessible: No
Location
- Location within Japan

Kita-Ichiyan Station (北一已駅, Kita-Ichiyan-eki) is a train station in Fukagawa, Hokkaidō, Japan.

The station was closed on 1 April 2026 along with the abolishment of the entire Rumoi Main Line.

== Lines ==
- Hokkaido Railway Company
  - Rumoi Main Line

== Adjacent stations ==
«	Service	»
Rumoi Main Line
Fukagawa	Local	Chippubetsu
