= Japan National Route 393 =

National highway in Japan

National Route 393
- 国道393号
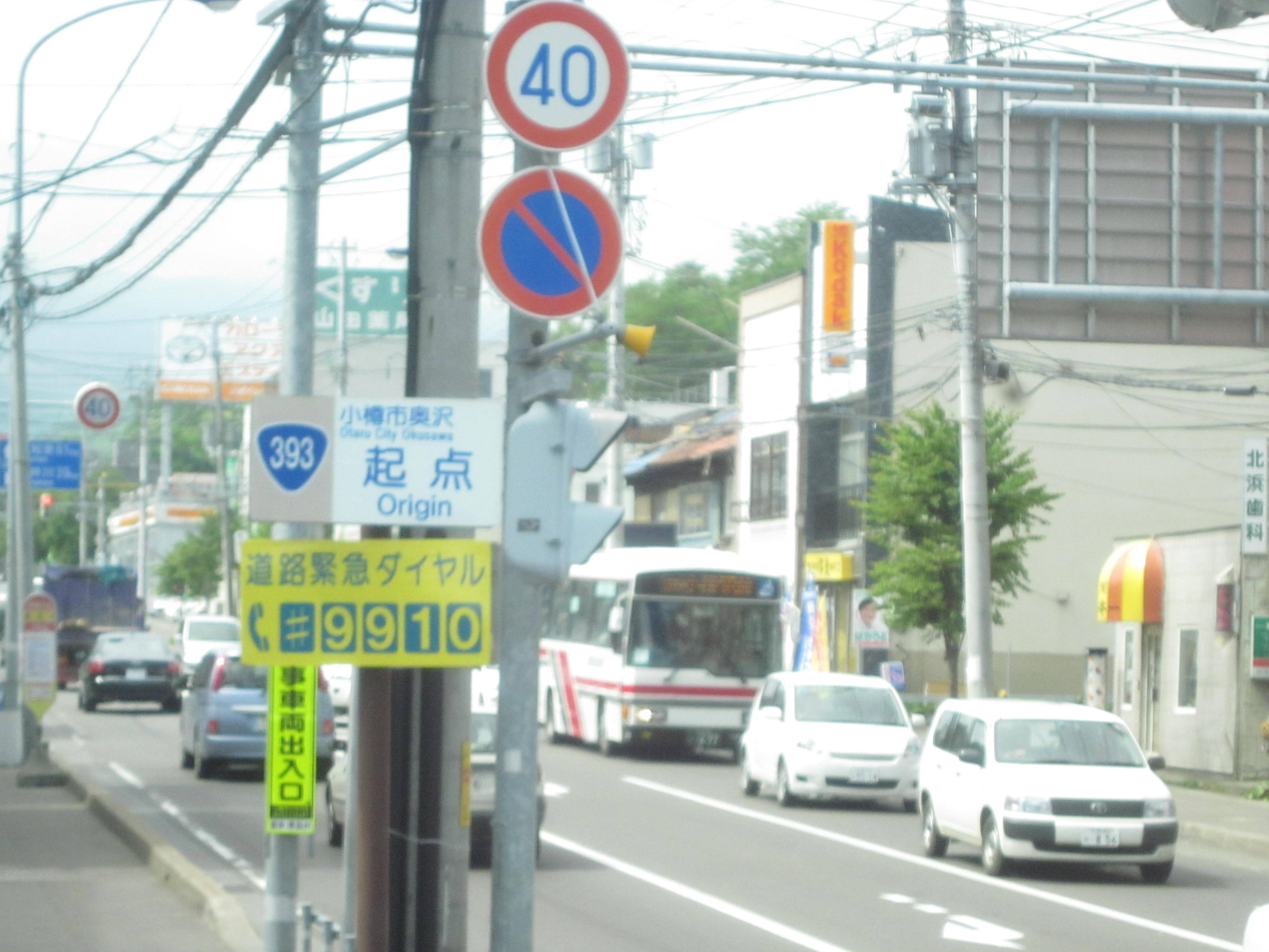

Route information
- Length: 51.7 km (32.1 mi)

Location
- Country: Japan

Highway system
- National highways of Japan; Expressways of Japan
← National Route 392	→ National Route 394

National Route 393 is a national highway of Japan connecting Otaru, Hokkaidō and Kutchan, Hokkaidō in Japan, with a total length of 51.7 km (32.12 mi).
