= Takushoku University Hokkaido Junior College =

Coordinates: 43°42′59.3″N 142°1′18″E

- 拓殖大学北海道短期大学
- Type: private
- Established: 1966
- Location: Fukagawa, Hokkaidō, Japan
- Website: http://www.takushoku-hc.ac.jp/

Takushoku University Hokkaido Junior College (拓殖大学北海道短期大学, Takushoku Daigaku Hokkaido Tanki Daigakubu) is a private junior college in Fukagawa, Hokkaidō, Japan. It was established in 1966.

== History ==
- 1966: Junior College was set up.
- 1980: The Childcare department was set up.
- 2000: Academic department of agricultural economics separated to academic department of management and economics and Environment farming.

== Academic departments ==
- Childcare
- Management and economics
- Environment farming

== See also ==
- List of junior colleges in Japan
