= Moseushi Station =

Railway station in Moseushi, Hokkaido, Japan

Moseushi Station 妹背牛駅
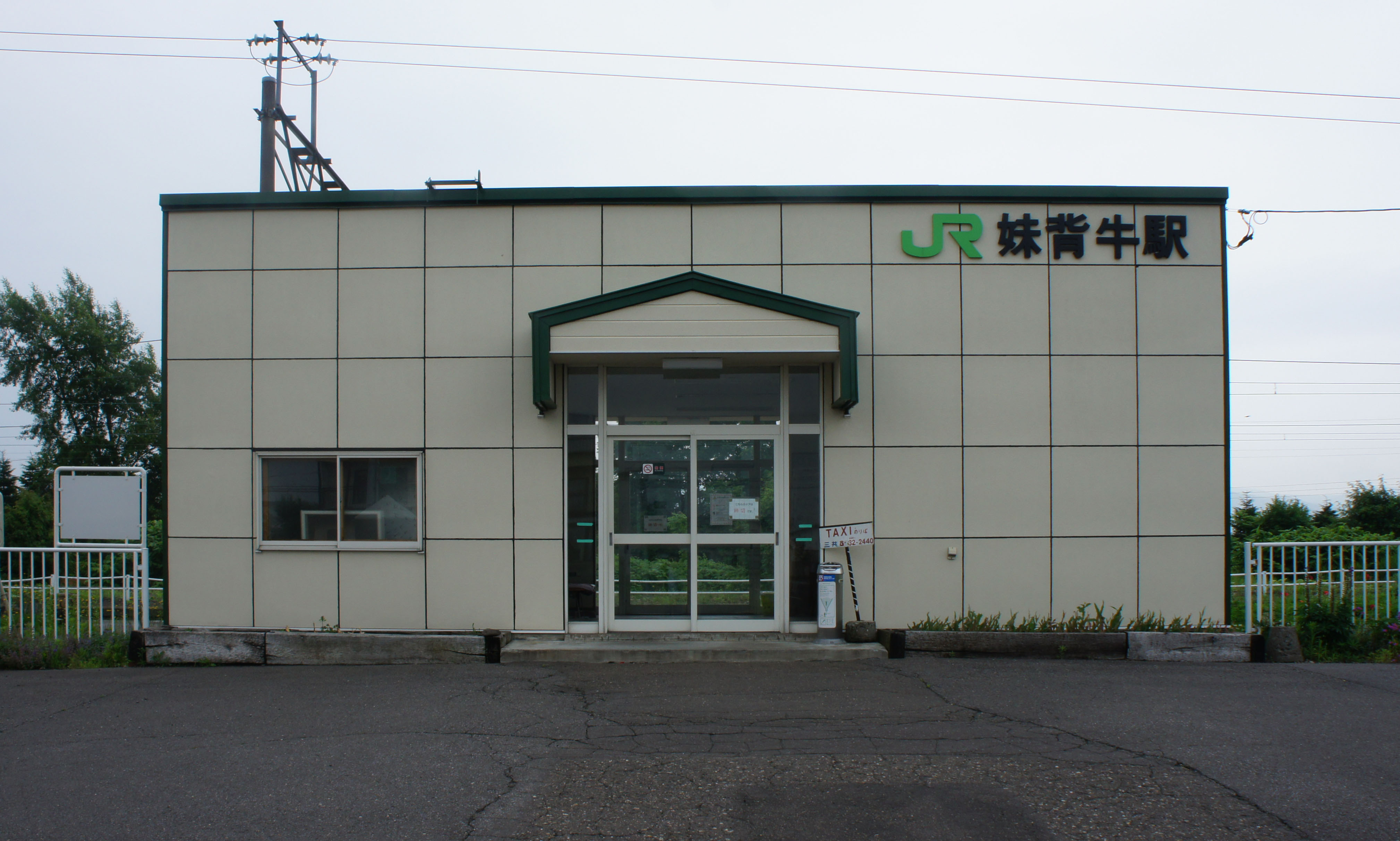

General information
- Location: Moseushi, Uryū District, Hokkaidō; Japan
- Coordinates: 43.6912°N 141.9664°E
- Operator: JR Hokkaido
- Line: Hakodate Main Line
Location

Moseushi Station (妹背牛駅, Moseushi-eki) is a railway station in Moseushi, Uryū District, Hokkaidō, Japan.

== Lines ==
- Hokkaido Railway Company
  - Hakodate Main Line Station A23

== Adjacent stations ==
«	Service	»
Hakodate Main Line
Limited Express Sōya: Does not stop at this station
Limited Express Okhotsk: Does not stop at this station
Ebeotsu	Local	Fukagawa
