= Fukagawa, Hokkaido =

Fukagawa 深川市
- City
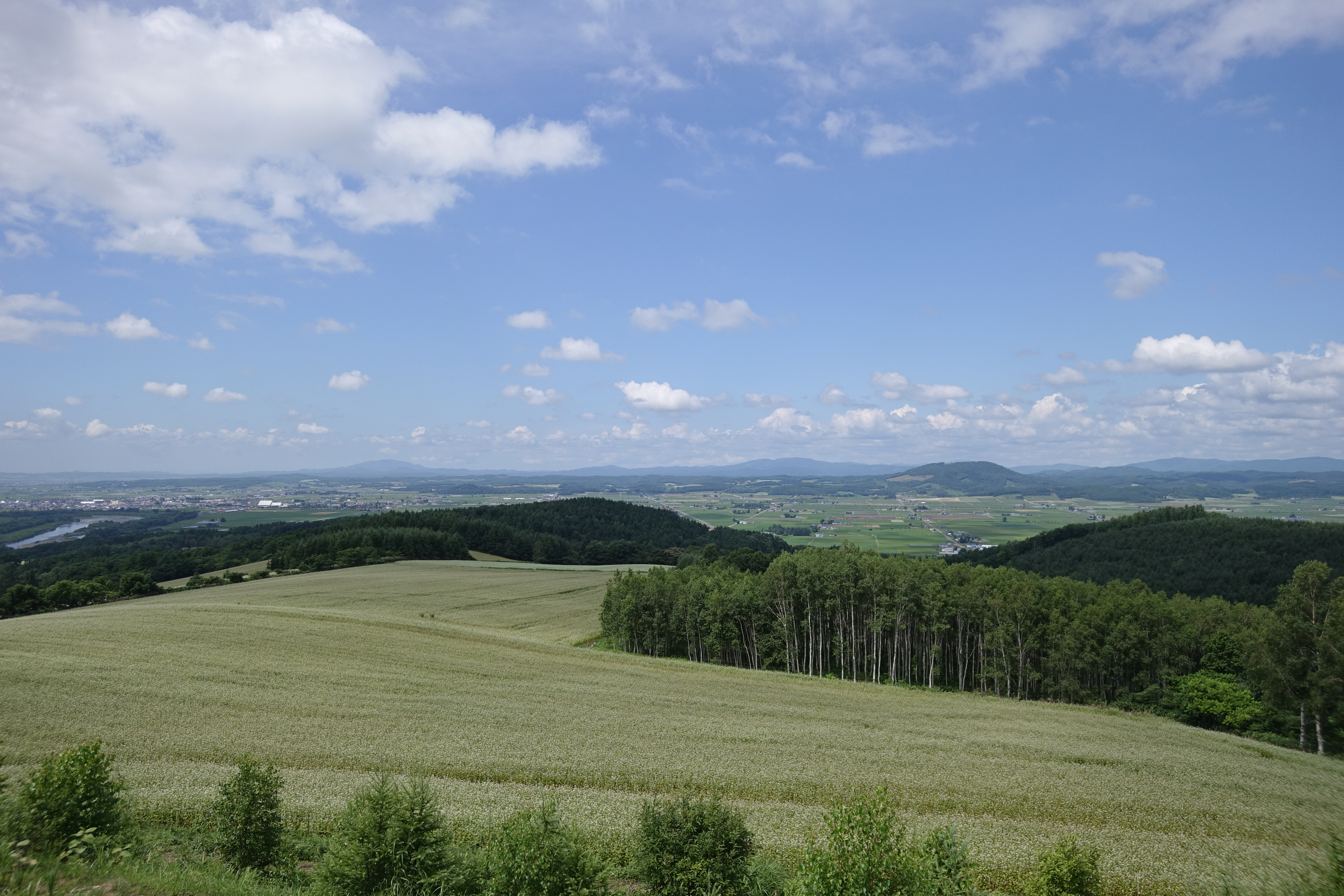

- Flag Emblem

- Location of Fukagawa in Hokkaido (Sorachi Subprefecture)

- Location in Japan
- Coordinates: 43°43′4″N 142°2′25″E
- Country: Japan
- Region: Hokkaido
- Prefecture: Hokkaido (Sorachi Subprefecture)

Government
  - Mayor: Takefumi Yamashita

Area
  - Total: 529.12 km^{2} (204.29 sq mi)

Population (October 1 2020)
  - Total: 20,039
  - Density: 37.872/km^{2} (98.089/sq mi)
- Time zone: UTC+09:00 (JST)
- City hall address: 17-17 Ni-jō, Fukagawa-shi, Hokkaidō; 074-8650
- Climate: Dfb
- Website: www.city.fukagawa.lg.jp
- Symbols
- Bird: Common cuckoo
- Flower: Chrysanthemum
- Tree: Japanese White Birch

Fukagawa (深川市, Fukagawa-shi) is a city located in Sorachi Subprefecture, Hokkaido, Japan.

As of 1 October 2020, the city has an estimated population of 20,039, and the density of 38 persons per km^{2}. The total area is 529.12 km^{2}.

Fukagawa is a small but vibrant city, best known for its plentiful rice fields and its apple and cherry orchards in Otoe, a township south of the downtown area. Fukagawa's growth is concentrated largely in Otoe, anchored by its Roadside Station, which is the third-busiest in Hokkaido, according to an article in the Hokkaido Shimbun.

== Geography ==
Fukagawa is located on the Ishikari Plain, and is roughly an equal distance in between Asahikawa to the northeast, and Takikawa to the southwest.

=== Neighboring municipalities ===
Fukagawa borders on nine municipalities in Hokkaido Prefecture, spanning Sorachi, Kamikawa, and Rumoi subprefectures:

- Kamikawa Subprefecture
  - Asahikawa
  - Horokanai
- Rumoi Subprefecture
  - Obira
- Sorachi Subprefecture
  - Akabira
  - Ashibetsu
  - Chippubetsu
  - Moseushi
  - Numata
  - Takikawa

== Climate ==
Climate data for Fukagawa (elevation 55 m, 1991–2020 normals, extremes 1977–present)
Month	Jan	Feb	Mar	Apr	May	Jun	Jul	Aug	Sep	Oct	Nov	Dec	Year
Record high °C (°F)	6.1 (43.0)	11.4 (52.5)	13.5 (56.3)	25.9 (78.6)	31.9 (89.4)	33.6 (92.5)	35.8 (96.4)	36.1 (97.0)	33.1 (91.6)	26.7 (80.1)	20.9 (69.6)	13.2 (55.8)	36.1 (97.0)
Mean daily maximum °C (°F)	−3.2 (26.2)	−2.0 (28.4)	2.3 (36.1)	10.1 (50.2)	17.6 (63.7)	21.8 (71.2)	25.2 (77.4)	25.8 (78.4)	21.8 (71.2)	15.0 (59.0)	6.5 (43.7)	−0.9 (30.4)	11.7 (53.1)
Daily mean °C (°F)	−7.3 (18.9)	−6.6 (20.1)	−2.0 (28.4)	4.8 (40.6)	11.7 (53.1)	16.4 (61.5)	20.1 (68.2)	20.6 (69.1)	16.1 (61.0)	9.5 (49.1)	2.5 (36.5)	−4.3 (24.3)	6.8 (44.2)
Mean daily minimum °C (°F)	−13.0 (8.6)	−13.0 (8.6)	−7.5 (18.5)	−0.5 (31.1)	6.3 (43.3)	11.9 (53.4)	16.2 (61.2)	16.4 (61.5)	10.9 (51.6)	4.3 (39.7)	−1.5 (29.3)	−9.0 (15.8)	1.8 (35.2)
Record low °C (°F)	−28.9 (−20.0)	−29.7 (−21.5)	−26.7 (−16.1)	−14.8 (5.4)	−3.2 (26.2)	2.6 (36.7)	6.8 (44.2)	7.5 (45.5)	0.7 (33.3)	−6.0 (21.2)	−18.9 (−2.0)	−28.7 (−19.7)	−29.7 (−21.5)
Average precipitation mm (inches)	50.0 (1.97)	39.9 (1.57)	42.7 (1.68)	47.9 (1.89)	67.9 (2.67)	62.1 (2.44)	130.1 (5.12)	147.3 (5.80)	147.0 (5.79)	122.6 (4.83)	111.1 (4.37)	74.4 (2.93)	1,044.2 (41.11)
Average snowfall cm (inches)	243 (96)	188 (74)	146 (57)	23 (9.1)	0 (0)	0 (0)	0 (0)	0 (0)	0 (0)	1 (0.4)	83 (33)	242 (95)	929 (366)
Average precipitation days (≥ 1.0 mm)	16.3	13.6	11.9	11.1	10.7	8.7	10.2	11.1	13.4	15.4	19.2	19.1	160.7
Mean monthly sunshine hours	73.9	91.1	133.1	162.1	195.7	171.6	166.9	163.3	153.4	127.4	65.3	54.2	1,560
Source: Japan Meteorological Agency (1991–2020 normals, extremes 1977–present)

== History ==
Fukagawa was settled by the tondenhei, or the colonist militia, between 1895 and 1896.

- 1892 Fukagawa village was founded.
- 1915 Tadoshi village split off from Ichiyan village.
- 1918 Fukagawa village became Fukagawa town.
- 1962 Tadoshi village became Tadoshi town.
- 1963 Fukagawa town, Ichiyan village, Osamunai village, and Otoe village were merged to form Fukagawa city.
- 1970 Tadoshi town was merged into Fukagawa city.

== Economy ==
The main economic activity of Fukagawa is rice production. Rice paddies in the city are irrigated by the Taishō Canal, which is channeled off the Ishikari River. Potatoes and apples are also agricultural products of the city.

== Education ==
=== Junior college ===
- Takushoku University Hokkaido Junior College

=== High schools ===
- Fukagawa City Board Of Education
  - Public
    - Hokkaido Fukagawa Nishi High School
    - Hokkaido Fukagawa Higashi High School
  - Private
    - Clark Memorial International High School

== Transportation ==
Both trains and buses provide a direct link to the prefectural capital, Sapporo.

=== Rail ===
- JR Hokkaido Hakodate Main Line : Fukagawa - Osamunai
- JR Hokkaido Rumoi Main Line : Fukagawa - Kita-Ichiyan

=== Road ===
- Hokkaido Expressway : Fukagawa IC
- Fukagaw-Rumoi Expressway : Fukagawa-Nishi IC
- Route 12

== Sister cities ==
- Abbotsford, British Columbia, Canada

== Tourism ==
One of the main tourist attractions is Mount Kamui, a popular ski resort technically in Asahikawa, but only minutes away from Fukagawa by car or bus.
