= Japan National Route 232 =

Road in Hokkaido, Japan

National Route 232
- 国道232号
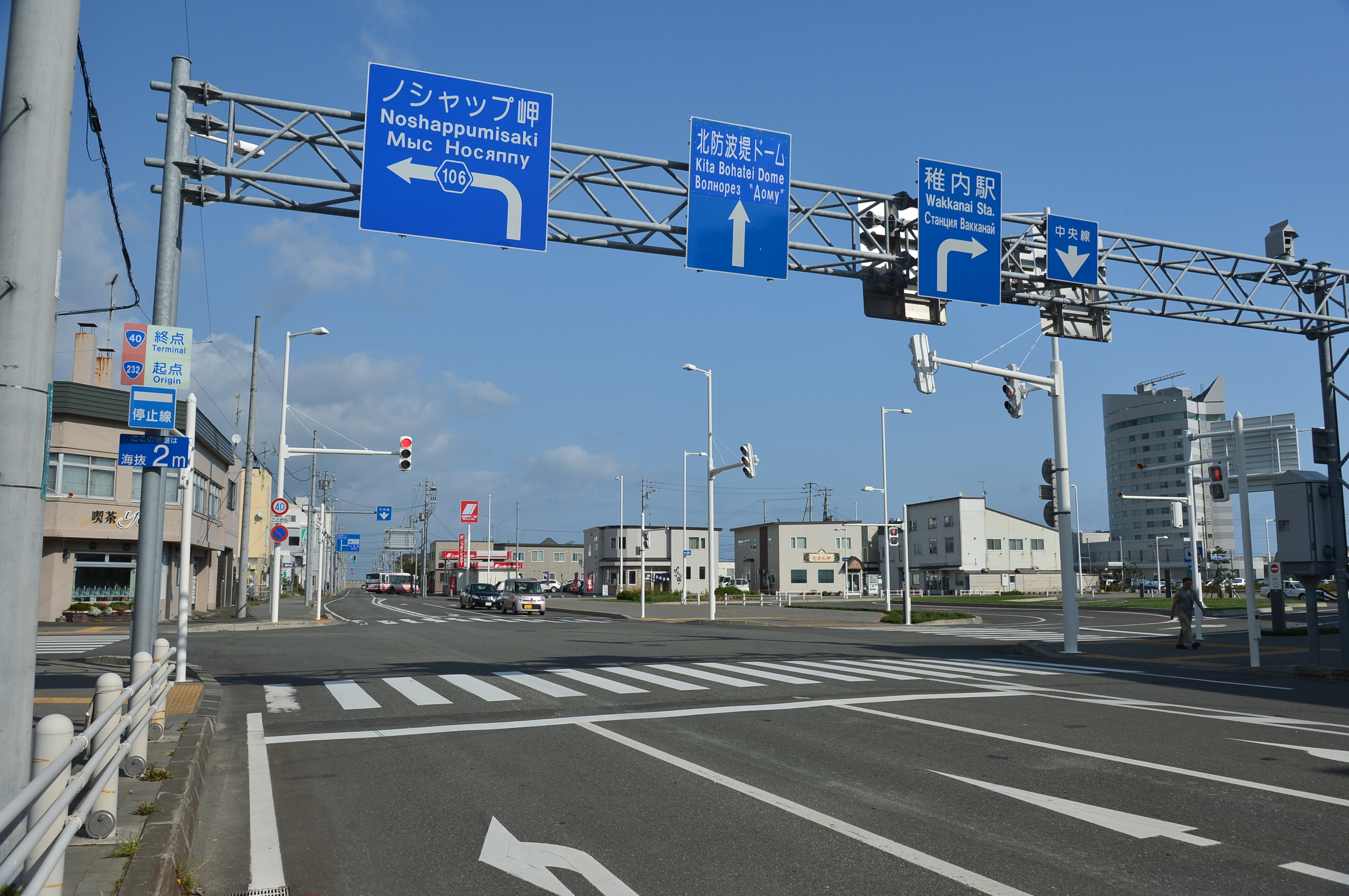

Route information
- Length: 184.8 km (114.8 mi)

Location
- Country: Japan

Highway system
- National highways of Japan; Expressways of Japan
← National Route 231	→ National Route 233

National Route 232 is a national highway of Japan connecting Wakkanai and Rumoi in Hokkaido, with a total length of 184.8 km (114.83 mi).
