= Japan National Route 452 =

National highway in Japan

National Route 452
- 国道452号

Route information
- Length: 124.4 km (77.3 mi)

Location
- Country: Japan

Highway system
- National highways of Japan; Expressways of Japan
← National Route 451	→ National Route 453

National Route 452 is a national highway of Japan connecting Yūbari, Hokkaidō and Asahikawa, Hokkaidō in Japan, with a total length of 124.4 km (77.3 mi).
