= Japan National Route 272 =

Road in Hokkaido, Japan

National Route 272
- 国道272号
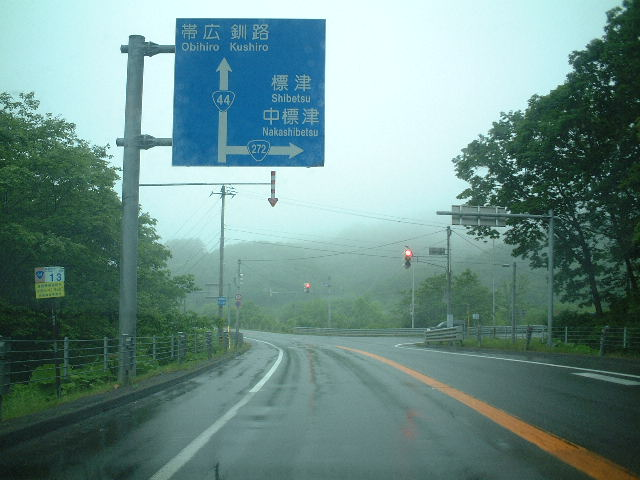
- Terminus of National Route 272 in Kushiro town.

Route information
- Length: 113.1 km (70.3 mi)
- Existed: 1 April 1970–present

Major junctions
- North end: National Route 244 in Shibetsu
- South end: National Route 38 / National Route 44 / National Route 336 / National Route 391 in Kushiro

Location
- Country: Japan

Highway system
- National highways of Japan; Expressways of Japan
← National Route 271	→ National Route 273

National Route 272 is a national highway of Japan connecting Kushiro and Shibetsu in Japan, with a total length of 113.1 km (70.28 mi).
