= Japan National Route 392 =

Road in Hokkaido, Japan

National Route 392
- 国道392号

Route information
- Length: 83.6 km (51.9 mi)

Location
- Country: Japan

Highway system
- National highways of Japan; Expressways of Japan
| ← National Route 391 | → National Route 393 |

National Route 392 is a national highway of Japan connecting Kushiro, Hokkaidō and Honbetsu, Hokkaidō in Japan, with a total length of 83.6 km (51.95 mi).
