= Japan National Route 275 =

National highway in Japan

National Route 275
- 国道275号
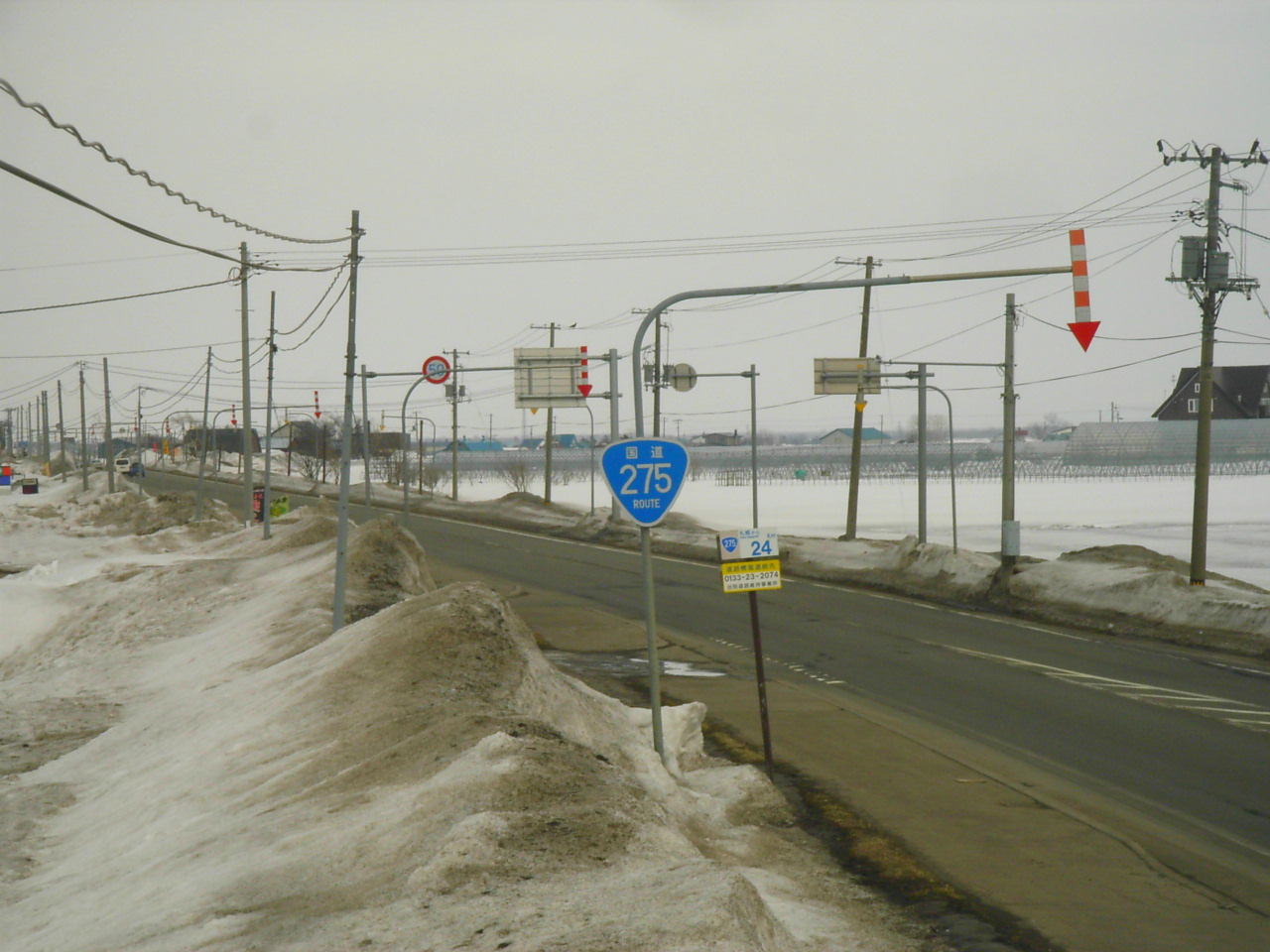

Route information
- Length: 315.2 km (195.9 mi)

Location
- Country: Japan

Highway system
- National highways of Japan; Expressways of Japan
← National Route 274	→ National Route 276

National Route 275 is a national highway of Japan connecting Chūō-ku, Sapporo and Hamatonbetsu, Hokkaidō in Japan, with a total length of 315.2 km (195.86 mi).
