= Japan National Route 231 =

National highway in Japan

National Route 231
- 国道231号
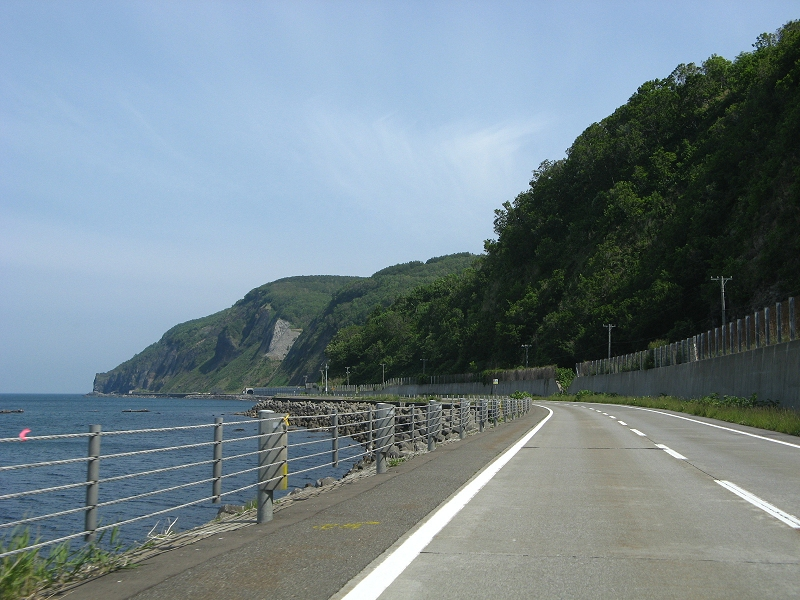

Route information
- Length: 129.2 km (80.3 mi)

Location
- Country: Japan

Highway system
- National highways of Japan; Expressways of Japan
← National Route 230	→ National Route 232

National Route 231 is a national highway of Japan connecting Kita-ku, Sapporo and Rumoi, Hokkaido in Japan, with a total length of 129.2 km (80.28 mi).
