= Japan National Route 233 =

National highway in Japan

National Route 233
- 国道233号
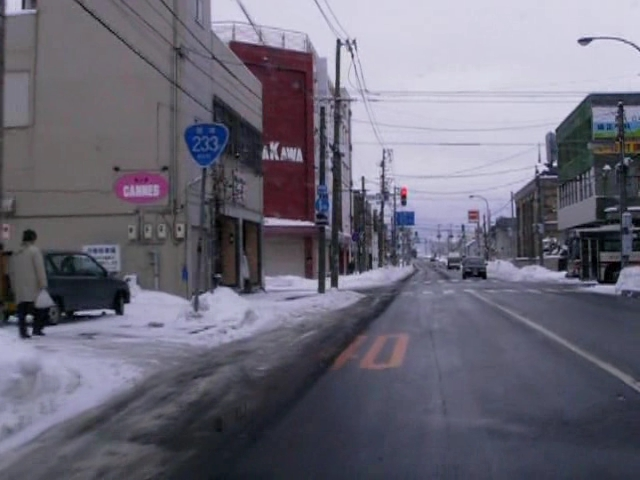

Route information
- Length: 78.3 km (48.7 mi)

Location
- Country: Japan

Highway system
- National highways of Japan; Expressways of Japan
← National Route 232	→ National Route 234

National Route 233 is a national highway of Japan connecting Asahikawa and Rumoi in Hokkaido, with a total length of 78.3 km (48.65 mi).
