= Ebeotsu Station =

Railway station in Takikawa, Hokkaido, Japan

Ebeotsu Station 江部乙駅
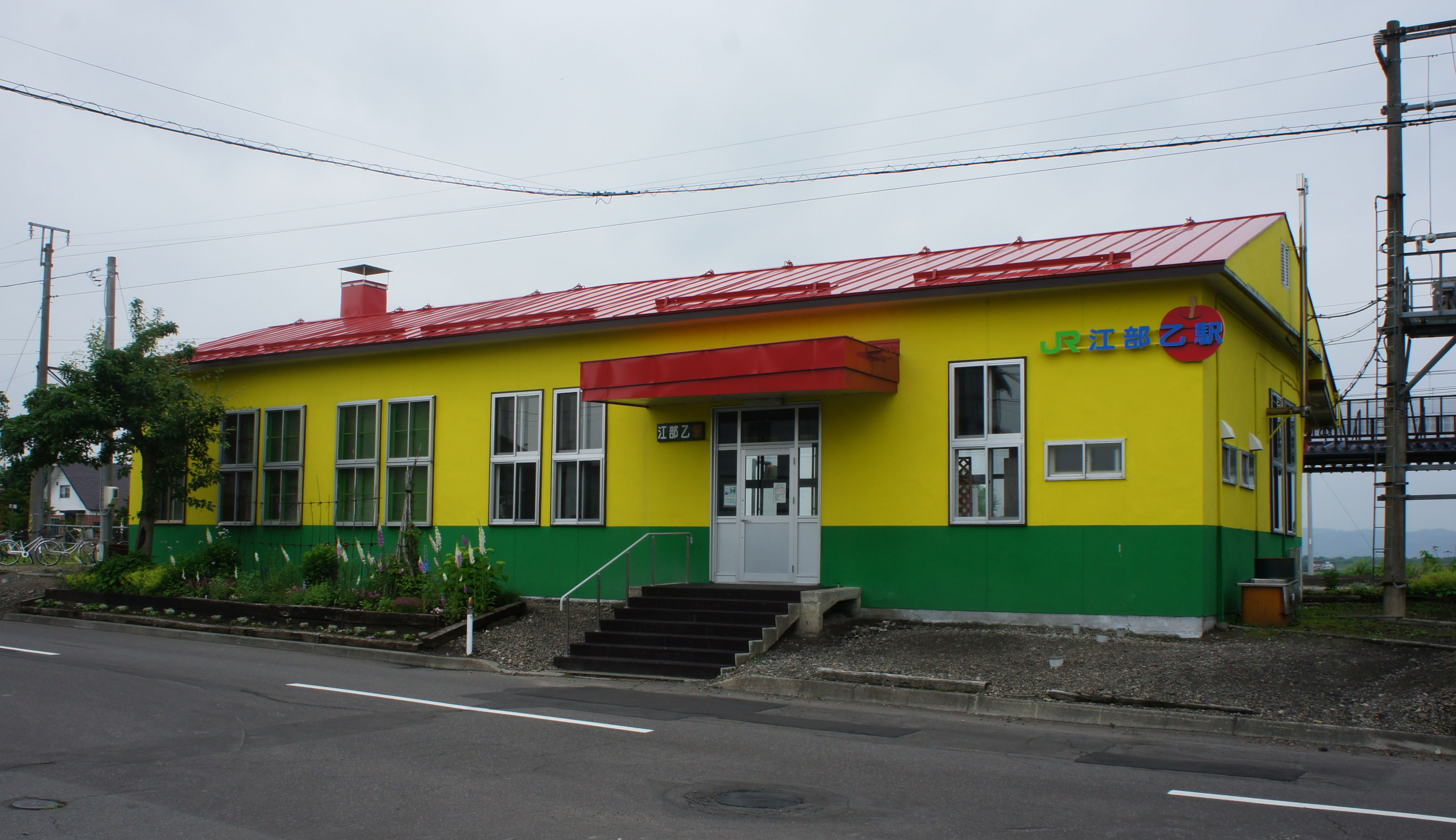

General information
- Location: Takikawa, Hokkaidō; Japan
- Coordinates: 43.6282°N 141.9356°E
- Operator: JR Hokkaido
- Line: Hakodate Main Line
Location

Ebeotsu Station (江部乙駅, Ebeotsu-eki) is a railway station in Takikawa, Hokkaidō, Japan.

== Lines ==
- Hokkaido Railway Company
  - Hakodate Main Line Station A22

== Adjacent stations ==
«	Service	»
Hakodate Main Line
Limited Express Sōya: Does not stop at this station
Limited Express Okhotsk: Does not stop at this station
Takikawa	Local	Moseushi
