= Japan National Route 234 =

National highway in Japan

National Route 234
- 国道234号

Route information
- Length: 69.6 km (43.2 mi)

Location
- Country: Japan

Highway system
- National highways of Japan; Expressways of Japan
← National Route 233	→ National Route 235

National Route 234 is a Japanese national highway connecting the cities of Iwamizama and Tomakomai in Hokkaido, Japan. It has a total route length of 69.6 km (43.2 mi).
