= Japan National Route 451 =

National highway in Japan

National Route 451
- 国道451号
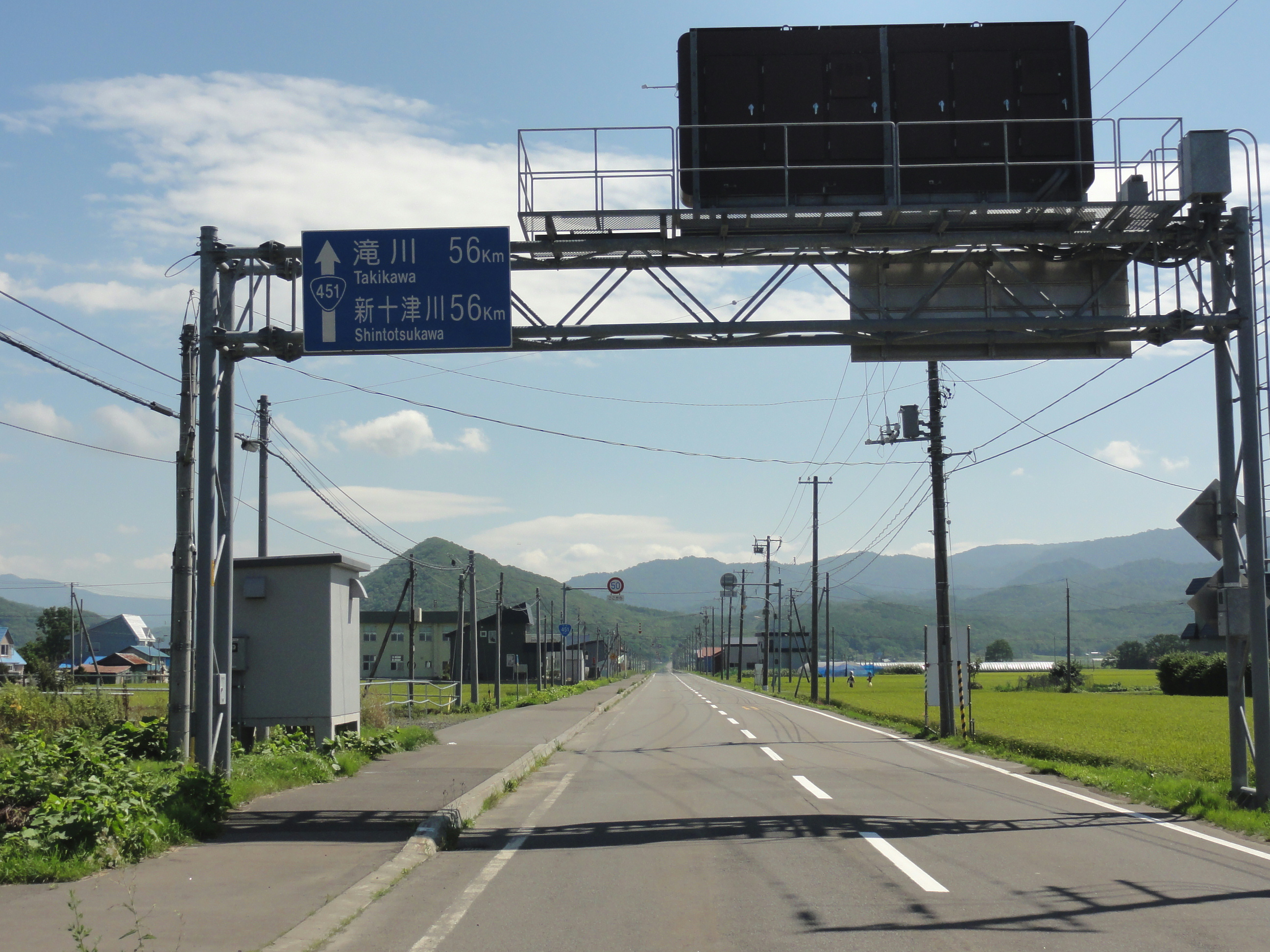

Route information
- Length: 116.5 km (72.4 mi)

Location
- Country: Japan

Highway system
- National highways of Japan; Expressways of Japan
← National Route 450	→ National Route 452

National Route 451 is a national highway of Japan connecting Rumoi, Hokkaido and Takikawa, Hokkaido in Japan, with a total length of 116.5 km (72.39 mi).
