= Japan National Route 274 =

Highway in Hokkaido, Japan

National Route 274
- 国道274号
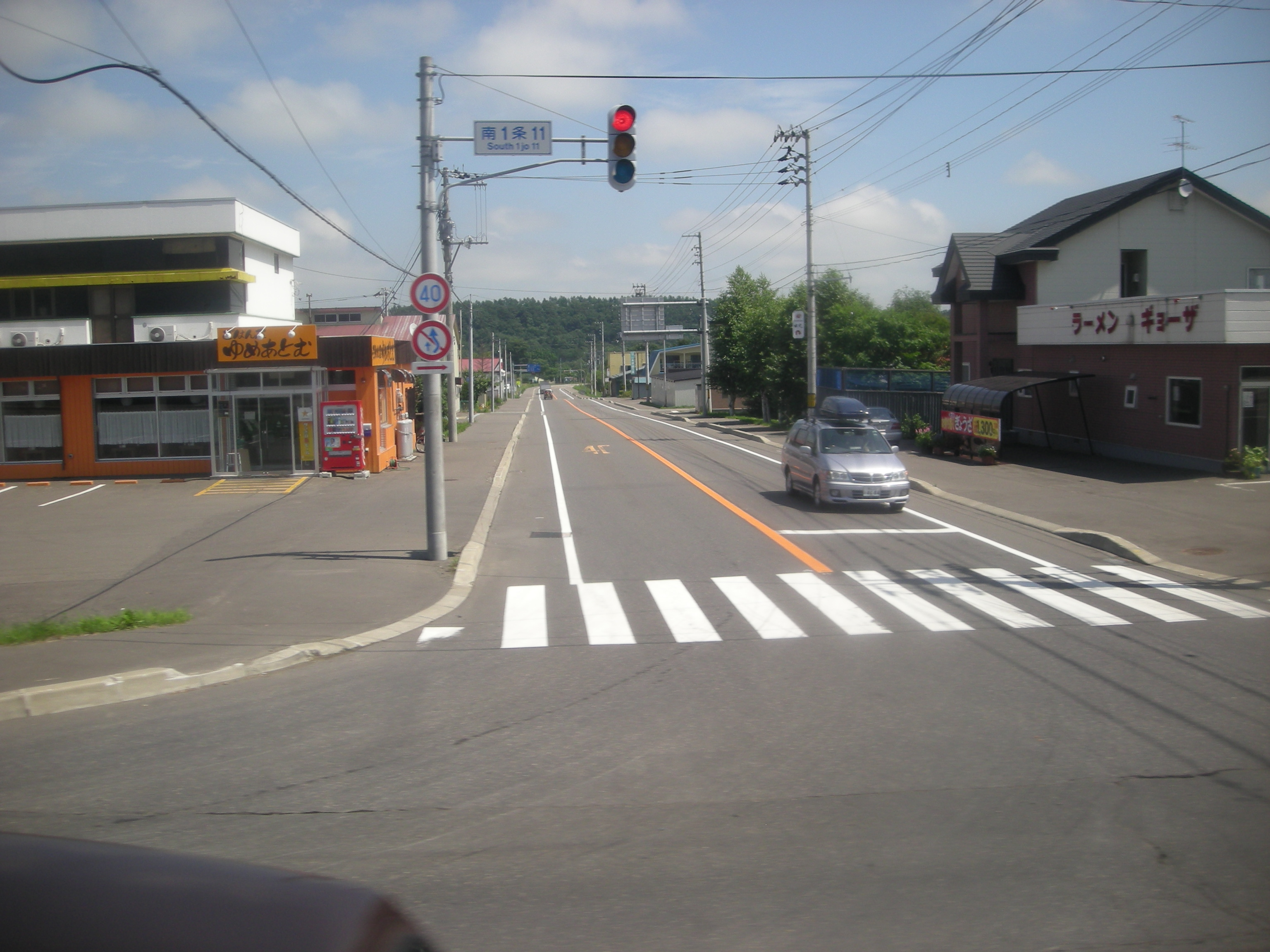

Route information
- Length: 371.8 km (231.0 mi)

Location
- Country: Japan

Highway system
- National highways of Japan; Expressways of Japan
← National Route 273	→ National Route 275

National Route 274 is a national highway of Japan connecting Kita-ku, Sapporo and Shibecha, Hokkaidō in Japan, with a total length of 371.8 km (231.03 mi).
