= Takikawa =

Takikawa 滝川市
- City
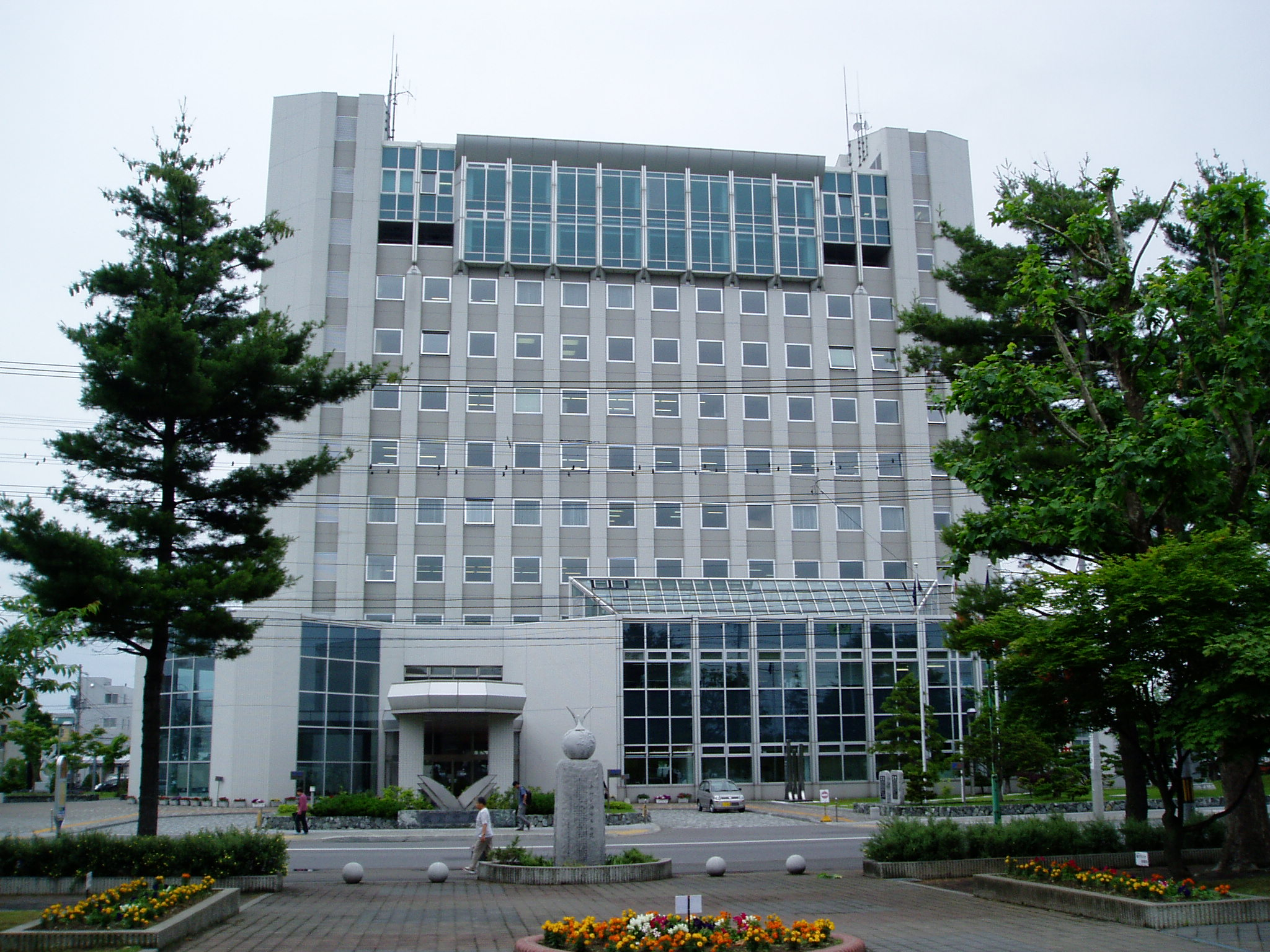
- Takikawa City Hall

- Flag Emblem

- Location of Takikawa in Hokkaido (Sorachi Subprefecture)

- Location in Japan
- Coordinates: 43°33′N 141°55′E
- Country: Japan
- Region: Hokkaido
- Prefecture: Hokkaido (Sorachi Subprefecture)

Government
  - Mayor: Kōkichi Maeda (since April 2011)

Area
  - Total: 115.90 km^{2} (44.75 sq mi)

Population (December 2016)
  - Total: 41,306
  - Density: 356.39/km^{2} (923.05/sq mi)
- Time zone: UTC+09:00 (JST)
- City hall address: 1-2-15, Ōmachi, Takikawa-shi, Hokkaidō; 073-8686
- Climate: Dfb
- Website: www.city.takikawa.hokkaido.jp
- Symbols
- Flower: Azalea and Cosmos
- Tree: Platanus

Takikawa (滝川市, Takikawa-shi) is a city located in the Sorachi Subprefecture, Hokkaido, Japan.

Takikawa City is located in the central area of Hokkaido, it is conveniently located between the cities of Sapporo (biggest city) and Asahikawa (the second biggest city). Takikawa has an inland climate which causes great temperature difference between summer and winter. The average temperature in Takikawa is about 19 degrees Celsius in summer, and –5.9 degrees Celsius (21.4 Fahrenheit) in winter. Takikawa is one of the snowiest locations in Hokkaido, the average amount of snowfall in the past 10 years is 7.77 meters (25 feet, 6 inches).

Takikawa is also the biggest city in northern Sorachi, making it a hub for neighboring towns. Takikawa is situated between the Ishikari River and Sorachi River, about 60 percent of Takikawa is covered in greenery by either forest or agriculture farmland. Takikawa is surrounded by rich nature.

As of December, 2016, the city has an estimated population of 41,306, with 21,561 households. The total area is 115.82 km^{2}.

== Origin of the name ==
The name of Takikawa City originates from the Ainu Language Sorapuchi which means "area under the waterfall". Also, along the mid-streams of Sorachi River, there is a difference in level which creates a mini waterfall, so the Ainu people have called it Sorapuchipetsu (Taki no kawa) which translates to Waterfall River, since then, the area has been called Takikawa.

== History ==
In 1890, under the ordinance of Hokkaido Prefectural Government, Takikawa Village was established to be a transportation hub to support the coal production of the neighbouring towns.

- 1890 - Takikawa Village opened.
- 1906 - Takikawa becomes a Second Class Municipality.
- 1909 - Takikawa becomes a First Class Municipality. Ebeotsu Village splits off.
- 1910 - Takikawa Village becomes Takikawa Town.
- 1952 - Ebeotsu Village becomes Ebeotsu Town.
- July 1, 1958 - Takikawa Town becomes Takikawa City.
- 1971 - Ebeotsu Town merged.

== Climate ==
Climate data for Takikawa (elevation 50 m, 1991–2020 normals, extremes 1976–present)
Month	Jan	Feb	Mar	Apr	May	Jun	Jul	Aug	Sep	Oct	Nov	Dec	Year
Record high °C (°F)	6.4 (43.5)	11.0 (51.8)	14.8 (58.6)	25.3 (77.5)	32.7 (90.9)	34.1 (93.4)	36.0 (96.8)	35.7 (96.3)	32.1 (89.8)	26.3 (79.3)	20.0 (68.0)	13.9 (57.0)	36.0 (96.8)
Mean daily maximum °C (°F)	−3.1 (26.4)	−1.9 (28.6)	2.4 (36.3)	10.2 (50.4)	17.7 (63.9)	21.9 (71.4)	25.4 (77.7)	26.0 (78.8)	22.0 (71.6)	15.0 (59.0)	6.6 (43.9)	−0.7 (30.7)	11.8 (53.2)
Daily mean °C (°F)	−6.9 (19.6)	−6.1 (21.0)	−1.7 (28.9)	5.0 (41.0)	11.7 (53.1)	16.2 (61.2)	20.0 (68.0)	20.7 (69.3)	16.3 (61.3)	9.6 (49.3)	2.6 (36.7)	−4.0 (24.8)	7.0 (44.6)
Mean daily minimum °C (°F)	−11.7 (10.9)	−11.5 (11.3)	−6.5 (20.3)	−0.1 (31.8)	6.3 (43.3)	11.6 (52.9)	16.1 (61.0)	16.6 (61.9)	11.5 (52.7)	4.7 (40.5)	−1.1 (30.0)	−8.0 (17.6)	2.3 (36.1)
Record low °C (°F)	−27.2 (−17.0)	−27.0 (−16.6)	−23.1 (−9.6)	−13.8 (7.2)	−2.3 (27.9)	1.4 (34.5)	7.2 (45.0)	7.7 (45.9)	1.6 (34.9)	−3.8 (25.2)	−14.7 (5.5)	−25.9 (−14.6)	−27.2 (−17.0)
Average precipitation mm (inches)	61.9 (2.44)	53.0 (2.09)	54.1 (2.13)	54.6 (2.15)	74.2 (2.92)	64.4 (2.54)	128.2 (5.05)	153.7 (6.05)	152.3 (6.00)	131.9 (5.19)	132.4 (5.21)	89.0 (3.50)	1,156 (45.51)
Average snowfall cm (inches)	208 (82)	168 (66)	131 (52)	21 (8.3)	0 (0)	0 (0)	0 (0)	0 (0)	0 (0)	2 (0.8)	90 (35)	228 (90)	844 (332)
Average precipitation days (≥ 1.0 mm)	17.9	15.7	13.4	11.3	10.9	8.9	10.1	10.8	12.7	15.8	19.3	20.9	168.3
Mean monthly sunshine hours	75.6	90.2	130.0	165.6	191.4	172.0	163.1	159.6	153.8	128.4	70.4	54.9	1,551.6
Source: Japan Meteorological Agency (1991–2020 normals, extremes 1976–present)

== Tourism ==
=== Festivals ===
- Lantern Festival - The event was founded by Igarashi Takenobu, an artist born in Takikawa with the goal of giving people the joy of crafting their own piece of artwork. It is an annual event that happens every Winter in Takikawa, and involves the hand crafting of lanterns by attendees
- Nanohana Festival - Nanohana (English: canola flowers) is a local food festival where signature dishes of the region can be tasted. The specialty of Takikawa is Jingisukan, a grilled mutton dish. The festival is held in Spring.

=== Places ===
- Children's Science Museum
- Fureai no Sato-onsen - A public outdoor hot spring.
- Maruka Highlands-Cloud Terrace (Unkai) - A hill with scenic views of the city, popular for its panoramas. "Unkai" is the Japanese word for "sea of clouds".
- Takikawa Art and Natural History Museum - The museum contains both local and foreign art and artefacts.
- Takikawa Regional History Center - A museum dedicated to the history of Takikawa.
- Takikawa Sky Park / Takikawa Sky Museum - Takikawa Sky Park is located along the river bed of Ishikari River.

== Education ==
=== High schools ===
- Takikawa City Board of education
  - Hokkaido Takikawa High School
  - Hokkaido Takikawa Technical High School
  - Hokkaido Takikawa Nishi High School (Municipal)

== Transportation ==
- Takikawa is 90 minutes away by JR or by car from New Chitose Airport. Takikawa is 50 min away by JR or 75 min by car from Sapporo City. Takikawa is 30 min away by JR or 80 min by car from Asahikawa Airport. Furano is also just 50 min away by car.
- Hakodate Main Line: Takikawa - Ebeotsu
- Nemuro Main Line: Takikawa - Higashi-Takikawa
- Hokkaidō Expressway: Takikawa IC

== Sister cities ==
- (Japan) Tochigi, Tochigi
- (Japan) Nago, Okinawa
- Springfield, Massachusetts, United States
