= Japan National Route 391 =

Road in Hokkaido, Japan

National Route 391
- 国道391号

Route information
- Length: 152.6 km (94.8 mi)

Location
- Country: Japan

Highway system
- National highways of Japan; Expressways of Japan
← National Route 390	→ National Route 392

National Route 391 is a national highway of Japan connecting Kushiro, Hokkaidō and Abashiri, Hokkaidō in Japan, with a total length of 152.6 km (94.82 mi).
