= Japan National Route 39 =

National highway in Hokkaido, Japan

National Route 39
- 国道39号
- Japan National Route 39 highlighted in red

Route information
- Length: 215.7 km (134.0 mi)
- Existed: 4 December 1952–present

Major junctions
- West end: National Route 12 / National Route 40 in Asahikawa
- Asahikawa-Monbetsu Expressway; National Route 273 / National Route 333; National Route 242; National Route 333; Tokachi-Okhotsk Expressway; National Route 334; National Route 240 / National Route 243; National Route 238 / National Route 239 / National Route 242
- East end: National Route 244 / National Route 391 in Abashiri

Location
- Country: Japan

Highway system
- National highways of Japan; Expressways of Japan
← National Route 38	→ National Route 40

National Route 39 (国道39号, Kokudō Sanjūkyū-gō) is a Japanese national highway connecting the two cities of Asahikawa and Abashiri in northeastern Hokkaido. The 215.7-kilometer-long (134.0 mi) highway begins at an intersection with National Routes 12 and 40 in Asahikawa. It travels northeast across the northern side of Hokkaido to Abashiri where it ends at an intersection with the paired National Route 244 and National Route 391.

== Route description ==
National Route 39 is a 215.7-kilometer-long (134.0 mi) highway in northern Hokkaido that runs north from Asahikawa to Abashiri. Its southern terminus lies at an intersection in central Asahikawa where it meets National Routes 12 and 40. Along the way from Asahikawa to Abashiri, it passes through the town of Kamikawa and the city of Kitami. Its northern terminus in Abashiri is at an intersection where it meets National Route 244 and National Route 391.

== History ==
National Route 39 was preceded by the Abashiri Road, a Meiji period road built to link the current cities of Asahikawa and Abashiri. Ordered by Genrōin secretary Kaneko Kentarō, construction on the road began in April 1886. It was completed by making use of prison labor from the prisoners that were to be incarcerated at Abashiri Prison in northeastern Hokkaido. The prison laborers were mainly political dissidents that Kaneko viewed as morally deficient. Construction of the Abashiri Road and the others leading from the more-developed southern part of Hokkaido to the prison were of strategic importance to Japan, which viewed Hokkaido as being vulnerable to an invasion from their neighbor, the Russian Empire.

On 4 December 1952 the highway was designated by the Cabinet of Japan as Primary National Highway 39 between Asahikawa and Abashiri. On 1 April 1965 it was reclassified as General National Highway 39 without any changes being made to its routing.

== Major junctions ==
The route lies entirely within Hokkaido.

Location	km	mi	Destinations	Notes
Asahikawa	0.0	0.0	National Route 12 south (Yonjō-dōri) – Sapporo, Fukagawa; National Route 40 north (Shōwa-dōri) – Nayoro, Shibetsu	Western terminus; end of National Route 333 concurrency; highway continues south as National Route 12
Asahikawa	0.3	0.19	Hokkaido Route 20 south (Midoribashi-dōri) – Asahikawa Station	
Asahikawa	2.3	1.4	Hokkaido Route 140 east (Kamui Asahiyama-dōri) – Asahiyama Zoo	Western end of Hokkaido Route 140 concurrency
Asahikawa	2.9	1.8	Hokkaido Route 140 east (Kinseibashi-dōri)	Eastern end of Hokkaido Route 140 concurrency
Asahikawa	5.4	3.4	Hokkaido Route 90 – to Dō-Ō Expressway, National Route 40, National Route 237, Asahikawa Airport, Ryutsudanchi	
Asahikawa	7.4	4.6	National Route 12 south (Asahikawa Shindō) – to Dō-Ō Expressway, National Route 40, Sapporo, Fukagawa	
Asahikawa	8.8	5.5	Hokkaido Route 37 – to Dō-Ō Expressway, National Route 40, Asahikawa Airport, Takasu, Higashikagura, Asahiyama Zoo	
Asahikawa	11.7	7.3	Hokkaido Route 761 west	
Tōma	14.7	9.1	Hokkaido Route 1122 east – Tōma Station	Western end of Hokkaido Route 1122 concurrency
Tōma	16.4	10.2	Hokkaido Route 1122 west – to Asahikawa-Monbetsu Expressway, National Route 40, Pippu	Eastern end of Hokkaido Route 1122 concurrency
Pippu	No major junctions			
Aibetsu	26.6	16.5	Hokkaido Route 101 north – Shimokawa; Hokkaido Route 140 west – to Asahikawa-Monbetsu Expressway, Daicolo-Aibetsu Airport, Aibetsu Station	
Aibetsu	35.0	21.7	Hokkaido Route 640 east – Koshiji	
Aibetsu	37.6	23.4	Asahikawa-Monbetsu Expressway – to Dō-Ō Expressway, Asahikawa	E39 exit 2-1 (Aizan Kamikawa Interchange); entrance to westbound E39, exit from eastbound E39
Aibetsu	39.2	24.4	Hokkaido Route 223 north – Antaroma Station	Western end of Hokkaido Route 223 concurrency
Kamikawa	40.4	25.1	Hokkaido Route 223 south – Aizankei Onsen	Eastern end of Hokkaido Route 223 concurrency
Kamikawa	45.9	28.5	Hokkaido Route 300 north – Central Kamikawa; Hokkaido Route 849 east – to Asahikawa-Monbetsu Expressway	
Kamikawa	47.4	29.5	National Route 273 north / National Route 333 east – Monbetsu, Engaru	Western end of National Route 273 concurrency, eastern end of National Route 333 concurrency
Kamikawa	54.0	33.6	Hokkaido Route 849 west – Kikusui	
Kamikawa	70.3	43.7	National Route 273 south – Obihiro, Nukabira Gensenkyo	Eastern end of National Route 273 concurrency
Kitami	116.0	72.1	Hokkaido Route 88 south – Tsunemoto, Kanoko Dam	
Kitami	125.8	78.2	Hokkaido Route 247 south – Oketo	
Kitami	133.7	83.1	National Route 242 north – Engaru, Ikutahara	Western end of National Route 242 concurrency
Kitami	134.1	83.3	Hokkaido Route 307 east – Rubeshibe Station	
Kitami	135.2	84.0	National Route 242 south – Rikubetsu, Oketo	Eastern end of National Route 242 concurrency
Kitami	136.1	84.6	Hokkaido Route 103 north – Hamasaroma	
Kitami	145.5	90.4	Hokkaido Route 143 south – Kunneppu	
Kitami	147.2	91.5	Hokkaido Route 245 north – Shimonikoro	
Kitami	154.1	95.8	Hokkaido Route 943 – to Tokachi-Okhotsk Expressway	
Kitami	156.9	97.5	Hokkaido Route 7 north – Tokoro; Hokkaido Route 27 east – to Tokachi-Okhotsk Expressway, Tsubetsu	
Kitami	158.0	98.2	Hokkaido Route 261 south (Tokiwa-dōri) – Oketo	
Kitami	158.2	98.3	Hokkaido Route 122 east – to Tokachi-Okhotsk Expressway	
Kitami	159.6	99.2	Hokkaido Route 217 east (Aoba-dōri) – Kaoryanse Park	
Kitami	160.7	99.9	Hokkaido Route 943 – to Tokachi-Okhotsk Expressway, Tokori, Minami-Ōdōri	
Kitami	165.7	103.0	Hokkaido Route 1024 south – Tanno	
Kitami	166.3	103.3	National Route 333 west – Engaru, Nikoro	
Kitami	168.0	104.4	Hokkaido Route 308 north – Tokoro	
Kitami	173.1	107.6	Hokkaido Route 556 south – to Tokachi-Okhotsk Expressway, central Hiushinai	
Kitami	173.8	108.0	Hokkaido Route 104 north – Ubaranai, Futamigaoka	
Bihoro	182.3	113.3	Tokachi-Okhotsk Expressway north – Abashiri, Memanbetsu	Bihoro-Takano Interchange (temporary signaled intersection)
Bihoro	184.3	114.5	Hokkaido Route 122 west – Tsubetsu; Hokkaido Route 248 north – Ubaranai	Western end of Hokkaido Route 122 concurrency
Bihoro	185.4	115.2	National Route 240 south / National Route 243 east – Kushiro, Akan; Hokkaido Route 309 north – Bihoro Station	Western end of concurrency with National Routes 240 and 243
Bihoro	185.8	115.5	Hokkaido Route 122 east	Eastern end of Hokkaido Route 122 concurrency
Bihoro	187.2	116.3	National Route 334 east – Shari, Koshimizu	
Bihoro	189.2	117.6	Tokachi-Okhotsk Expressway – Kitami, Tanno, Memanbetsu Airport; Hokkaido Route 122 west	Bihoro Interchange
Ōzora	194.1	120.6	Hokkaido Route 246 east – to Tokachi-Okhotsk Expressway, Memanbetsu Airport	
Ōzora	196.3	122.0	Hokkaido Route 714 west – Ubaranai	
Ōzora	198.7	123.5	Hokkaido Route 249 south	
Ōzora	199.1	123.7	Hokkaido Route 64 south / Hokkaido Route 246 west – to Tokachi-Okhotsk Expressway, Memanbetsu Airport	Western end of Hokkaido Route 246 concurrency
Ōzora	200.0	124.3	Hokkaido Route 246 east – Koshimizu	Eastern end of Hokkaido Route 246 concurrency
Abashiri	204.6	127.1	Hokkaido Route 683 north – Mount Tento	
Abashiri	211.6	131.5	National Route 238 west / National Route 239 west / National Route 242 south – Monbetsu, Tokoro	Western end of National Route 242 concurrency
Abashiri	213.6	132.7	Hokkaido Route 23 east – Shari, Koshimizu	
Abashiri	214.8	133.5	Hokkaido Route 76 west – Cape Notoro	
Abashiri	215.4	133.8	Hokkaido Route 23 west – Abashiri Station; Hokkaido Route 1083 east – Abashiri Port	
Abashiri	215.7	134.0	National Route 244 east / National Route 391 south – Shari, Hamakoshimizu	Eastern terminus; highway continues east as National Route 244 and south as National Route 391; end of concurrency with National Routes 240, 242, and 243
1.000 mi = 1.609 km; 1.000 km = 0.621 mi: Concurrency terminus; Incomplete access; Route transition
