= Japan National Route 238 =

Road in Hokkaido, Japan

National Route 238
- 国道238号
- Japan National Route 238 highlighted in red
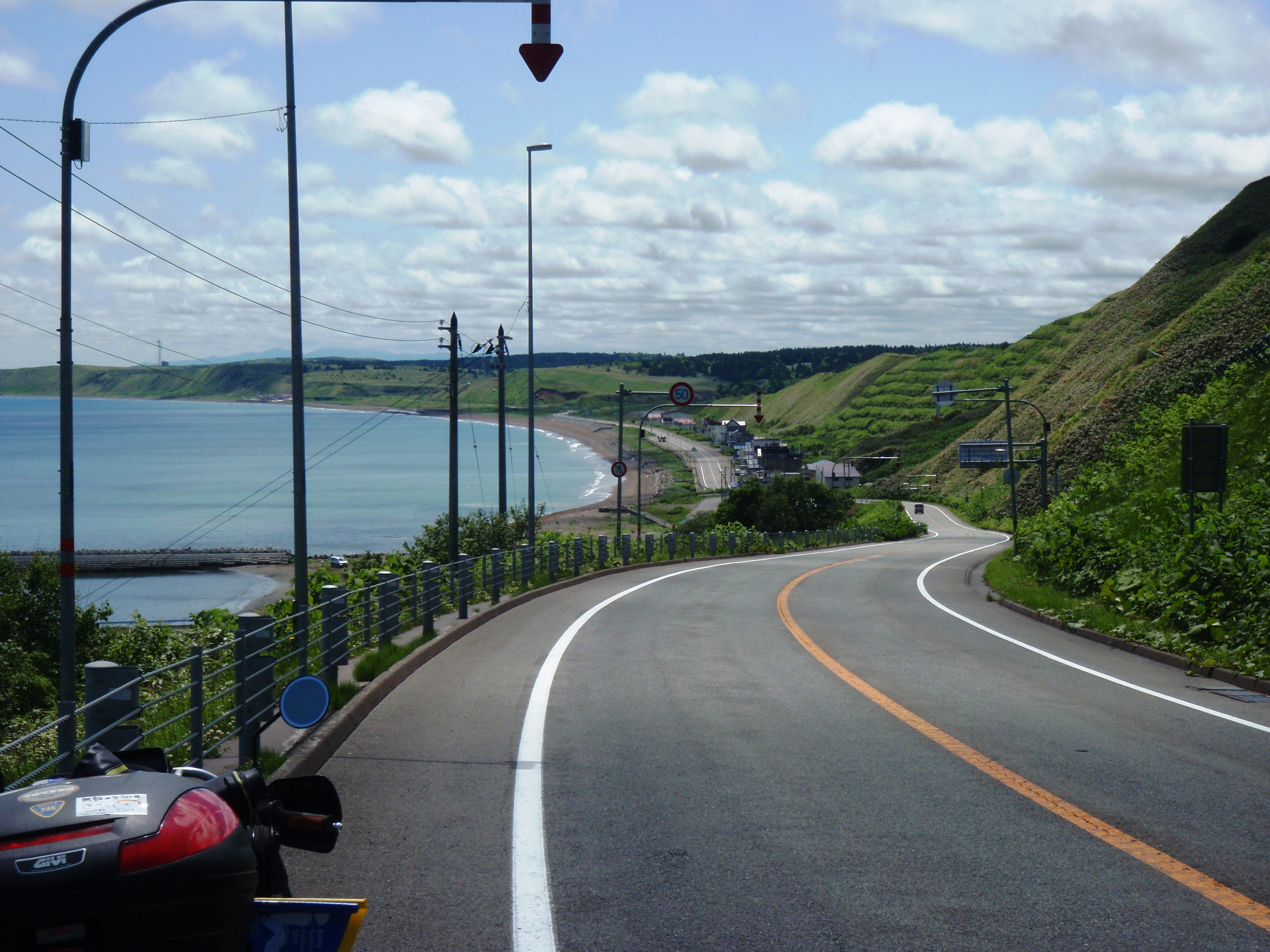

Route information
- Length: 319.6 km (198.6 mi)

Major junctions
- East end: National Route 39 / National Route 239 / National Route 240 / National Route 243 in Abashiri
- West end: National Route 40 / National Route 232 in Wakkanai

Location
- Country: Japan

Highway system
- National highways of Japan; Expressways of Japan
← National Route 237	→ National Route 239

National Route 238 (国道238号, Kokudō Nihyaku sanjūhachi-gō) is the northernmost of the national highways of Japan. It connects the cities of Abashiri and Wakkanai in the northern part of the island and prefecture of Hokkaido in northern Japan.

== History ==
On 18 May 1953, the highway was established as Second Class National Highway 238 by the Cabinet of Japan. It was re-designated as General National Route 238 on 1 April 1965. A curve of the road was made less sharp in Yubetsu on 1 April 2018, this shortened the total length of the highway by 30 meters (98 ft).

== Major junctions ==
The route lies entirely within Hokkaido.

Location	km	mi	Destinations	Notes
Abashiri	0.0	0.0	National Route 39 / National Route 239 west / National Route 240 / National Route 242 / National Route 243 – Shari, Hamakoshimizu, Kitami, Bihoro	Eastern terminus; eastern end of National Route 239 and 242 concurrency; highway continues east as National Route 39
Abashiri	1.4	0.87	Hokkaido Route 1010 north – Notoro Fishing Port	
Abashiri	5.5	3.4	Hokkaido Route 104 south – Kitami	
Abashiri	7.2	4.5	Hokkaido Route 76 east – Cape Notori	
Abashiri	11.0	6.8	Hokkaido Route 591 south – Kitami, Bihoro	
Kitami	26.0	16.2	Hokkaido Route 409 (Tokoro Harbor Road) west	
Kitami	27.0	16.8	Hokkaido Route 1033 west – Central Tokoro	
Kitami	29.4	18.3	Hokkaido Route 7 – Central Tokoro, Kitami	
Kitami	30.9	19.2	Hokkaido Route 1033 east – Central Tokoro	
Kitami	31.6	19.6	Hokkaido Route 442 west – Lake Saroma	
Kitami	39.4	24.5	Hokkaido Route 442 east – Lake Saroma, Sakaeura	
Saroma	41.6	25.8	Hokkaido Route 103 west – Rubeshibe, Saroma	
Saroma	42.2	26.2	Hokkaido Route 858 west – Kimuaneppu Cape	
Saroma	54.0	33.6	Hokkaido Route 961 south – Saroma	
Yūbetsu	60.4	37.5	Hokkaido Route 685 south – to National Route 333, Wakasa	
Yūbetsu	68.0	42.3	Hokkaido Route 244 south – Engaru	
Yūbetsu	77.3	48.0	National Route 242 south – Rubeshibe, Engaru; Hokkaido Route 712 west – Ryokuin	Western end of National Route 242 concurrency
Yūbetsu	79.0	49.1	Hokkaido Route 204 north – Yūbetsu	
Monbetsu	85.6	53.2	Hokkaido Route 873 west – Motomonbetsu	
Monbetsu	89.3	55.5	Hokkaido Route 1151 south – Okhotsk Monbetsu Airport	
Monbetsu	92.3	57.4	Hokkaido Route 873 east – Maruseppu	
Monbetsu	92.9	57.7	Hokkaido Route 305 – Central Motomonbetsu, Central Monbetsu	
Monbetsu	93.3	58.0	Hokkaido Route 304 north – Central Monbetsu, Okhotsk Sea Ice Museum of Hokkaido	
Monbetsu	94.9	59.0	Hokkaido Route 713 – Central Monbetsu, Takinoue	
Monbetsu	102.1	63.4	National Route 273 south – Kamikawa, Takinoue; Hokkaido Route 305 east – Central Monbetsu	Northern terminus of National Route 273
Okoppe	111.3	69.2	Hokkaido Route 492 north – Central Okoppe	
Okoppe	118.0	73.3	Hokkaido Route 334 south – Nakamokoppe	
Okoppe	121.2	75.3	National Route 239 west – Nayoro, Nishiokoppe	Western end of National Route 239 concurrency
Ōmu	129.7	80.6	Hokkaido Route 883 south – Nishiokoppe	
Ōmu	138.6	86.1	Hokkaido Route 49 west – Bifuka	
Ōmu	162.0	100.7	Hokkaido Route 60 south – Shimokawa, Bifuka	
Esashi	170.0	105.6	Hokkaido Route 880 west – Kamiotoshibe	
Esashi	180.8	112.3	Hokkaido Route 1023 west – Utanobori	
Esashi	199.7	124.1	Hokkaido Route 12 west – Utanobori	
Esashi	200.1	124.3	Hokkaido Route 1069 north – Central Esashi	
Esashi	204.2	126.9	Hokkaido Route 1069 south – Central Esashi	
Hamatonbetsu	225.5	140.1	Hokkaido Route 586 west – Nakatonbetsu	
Hamatonbetsu	230.1	143.0	Hokkaido Route 1074 north – Tonbetsu	
Hamatonbetsu	232.0	144.2	National Route 275 south – Otoineppu, Nakatonbetsu	Northern terminus of National Route 239
Sarufutsu	241.3	149.9	Hokkaido Route 710 south – Nitachinai	
Sarufutsu	247.4	153.7	Hokkaido Route 732 south – Toyotomi	
Sarufutsu	254.4	158.1	Hokkaido Route 584 west – Central Sarufutsu	
Sarufutsu	264.0	164.0	Hokkaido Route 138 west – to National Route 40, Onishibetsu, Toyotomi	
Wakkanai	275.6	171.2	Hokkaido Route 1077 west – Central Wakkanai, Wakkanai Airport	
Wakkanai	298.1	185.2	Hokkaido Route 889 south – Sōya Hill	
Wakkanai	307.6	191.1	Hokkaido Route 1077 east – Onishibetsu, Numakawa	
Wakkanai	313.4	194.7	Hokkaido Route 121 south – Numakawa, Wakkanai Airport	
Wakkanai	315.2	195.9	Hokkaido Route 1133 south – Hokkaido Sōya Fureai Park	
Wakkanai	319.6	198.6	National Route 40 / National Route 232 – Nayoro, Toyotomi, Wakkanai Station	Western terminus
1.000 mi = 1.609 km; 1.000 km = 0.621 mi: Concurrency terminus
