= Ashoro =

Town in Japan

Ashoro 足寄町 Ashoro-chō
- Town
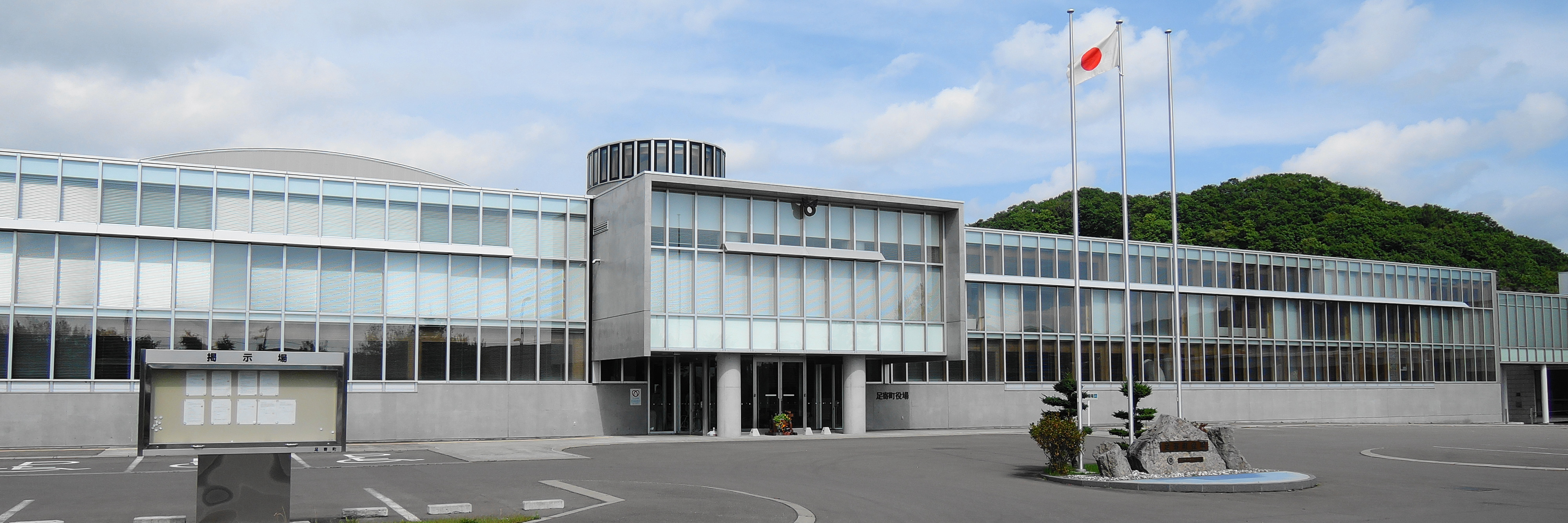
- Ashoro Town Hall

- Flag Emblem

- Location of Ashoro in Hokkaido (Tokachi Subprefecture)

- Coordinates: 43°14′41″N 143°33′14″E
- Country: Japan
- Region: Hokkaido
- Prefecture: Hokkaido (Tokachi Subprefecture)
- District: Ashoro

Area
  - Total: 1,408.04 km^{2} (543.65 sq mi)

Population (December 31, 2025)
  - Total: 5,772
  - Density: 4.099/km^{2} (10.62/sq mi)
- Time zone: UTC+09:00 (JST)
- City hall address: 48-1 Kita 1-jo 4-chome, Ashoro-cho, Ashoro-gun, Hokkaido 089-3797
- Climate: Dfb
- Website: www.town.ashoro.hokkaido.jp/kurashi/
- Symbols
- Bird: Hazel grouse
- Flower: Ezo Rhododendron
- Mascot: Ayumi-chan (アユミちゃん)
- Tree: Sakhalin spruce

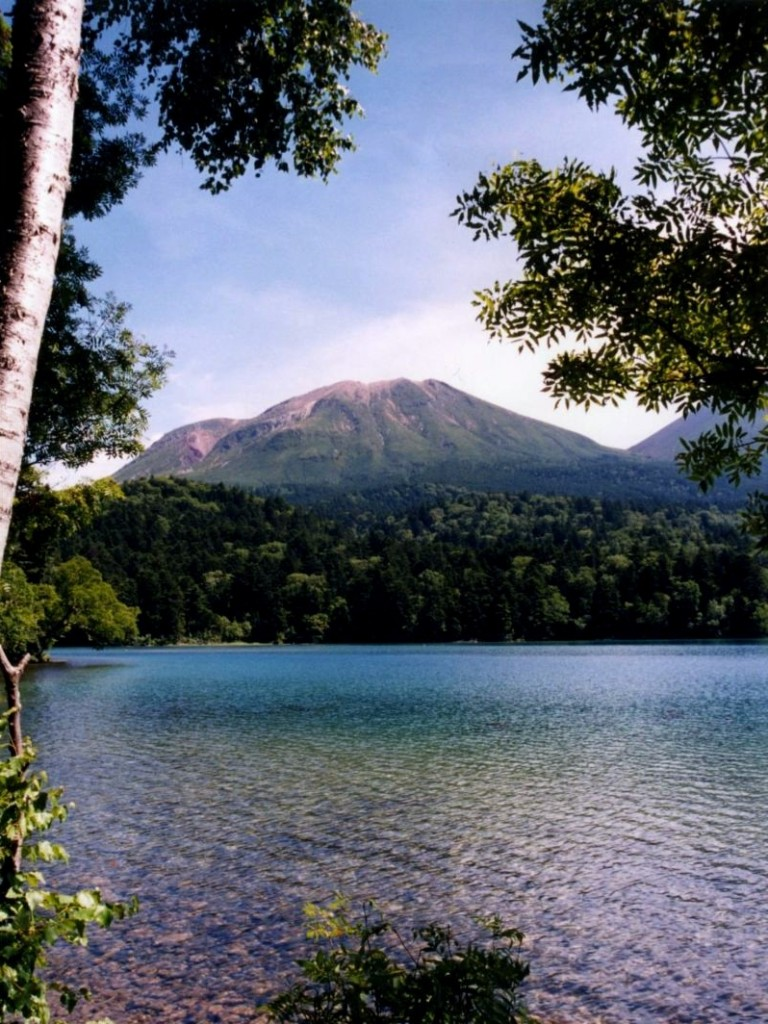
Lake Onnetō

Ashoro (足寄町, Ashoro-chō) is a town located in Tokachi Subprefecture, Hokkaidō, Japan. As of 31 December 2025, the town had an estimated population of 5,772 in 3130 households, and a population density of 4 people per km^{2}. The total area of the town is 1,408.04 km^{2} (543.65 sq mi).

== Geography ==
Ashoro is located in southeastern Hokkaido in the northeastern part of the Tokachi Subprefecture. Its boundaries roughly encompass the middle reaches of the Tobetsu River, which flows from Rikubetsu to the north, and the basins of its tributaries, the Ashoro and Misatobetsu River basins. The Ishikari Mountains dominate the northwestern part, and the eastern edge is home to Mount Meakan (1499 meters), giving it a high elevation. Lake Onnetō is a major attraction of the town and is a part of Akan National Park. The central southern part is flat along the Tobetsu River valley, where the urban center is located. It was the largest municipality in Japan until the merger of Takayama City, Gifu Prefecture on February 1, 2005. Some 83 percent of the town's land is forested. Ashoro is also known for its large butterbur that can grow up to three meters tall and have a diameter of 10 cm. Butterbur plays such a significant role that the town mascot, Ayumi-chan, carries a piece of butterbur. Rawan butterbur is nationally renowned and has been designated as a Hokkaido Heritage.

=== Neighboring municipalities ===
- Kamishihoro
- Honbetsu
- Rikubetsu
- Oketo
- Tsubetsu
- Kushiro
- Shiranuka

=== Climate ===
According to the Köppen climate classification, Ashoro has a humid continental climate. It has large temperature differences, including large annual and daily temperature ranges. It receives heavy snowfall and is designated as a heavy snow area. In winter, temperatures of around -25 °C are not uncommon, making it extremely cold. On average, Ashoro receives 846.5 mm of rain, with August being the wettest month (151 mm) and February the driest (4.5 mm). On average, temperatures vary from 23.2 degrees Celsius in August to -8 degrees Celsius in January.

Climate data for Ashoro（1991 - 2020）
Month	Jan	Feb	Mar	Apr	May	Jun	Jul	Aug	Sep	Oct	Nov	Dec	Year
Record high °C (°F)	7.3 (45.1)	13.8 (56.8)	19.2 (66.6)	30.0 (86.0)	38.8 (101.8)	37.1 (98.8)	38.2 (100.8)	36.6 (97.9)	34.4 (93.9)	30.1 (86.2)	21.4 (70.5)	13.9 (57.0)	38.8 (101.8)
Mean daily maximum °C (°F)	−1.4 (29.5)	−0.1 (31.8)	4.6 (40.3)	11.9 (53.4)	18.2 (64.8)	21.7 (71.1)	24.7 (76.5)	25.6 (78.1)	22.0 (71.6)	15.9 (60.6)	8.2 (46.8)	0.8 (33.4)	12.7 (54.9)
Daily mean °C (°F)	−9.1 (15.6)	−7.5 (18.5)	−1.4 (29.5)	5.2 (41.4)	11.2 (52.2)	15.3 (59.5)	19.1 (66.4)	20.1 (68.2)	16.0 (60.8)	9.1 (48.4)	2.0 (35.6)	−5.9 (21.4)	6.2 (43.2)
Mean daily minimum °C (°F)	−16.3 (2.7)	−15.2 (4.6)	−7.5 (18.5)	−1.1 (30.0)	4.8 (40.6)	10.2 (50.4)	14.8 (58.6)	16.0 (60.8)	11.1 (52.0)	3.2 (37.8)	−3.6 (25.5)	−12.2 (10.0)	0.4 (32.7)
Record low °C (°F)	−29.4 (−20.9)	−29.0 (−20.2)	−21.9 (−7.4)	−13.3 (8.1)	−5.4 (22.3)	−0.6 (30.9)	5.1 (41.2)	5.7 (42.3)	−1.0 (30.2)	−7.3 (18.9)	−17.2 (1.0)	−24.4 (−11.9)	−29.4 (−20.9)
Average precipitation mm (inches)	26.2 (1.03)	17.7 (0.70)	32.3 (1.27)	55.8 (2.20)	83.8 (3.30)	72.4 (2.85)	114.0 (4.49)	147.3 (5.80)	124.5 (4.90)	79.6 (3.13)	44.0 (1.73)	36.0 (1.42)	833.5 (32.81)
Average precipitation days (≥ 1.0 mm)	5.1	4.3	6.1	8.1	10.1	9.5	10.4	11.4	10.6	8.8	7.3	6.6	98.3
Mean monthly sunshine hours	181.8	173.1	203.4	183.1	176.4	146.9	123.8	127.0	144.2	167.4	161.9	164.9	1,953.9
Source: JMA

=== Demographics ===
Per Japanese census data, the population of Ashoro has declined in recent decades.

Historical population
Year	Pop.	±%
1970	15,172	—
1980	12,667	−16.5%
1990	10,289	−18.8%
2000	8,871	−13.8%
2010	7,640	−13.9%
2020	6,563	−14.1%

== History ==
The first known Japanese settler arrived in the Ashoro area in 1879. Ashoro became a second-class village in 1923. It once belonged to Kushiro Province, but due to poor transportation access, it was transferred to Tokachi Province in 1948. It merged with the village of Nishiashoro on April 1, 1955, to form the town of Ashoro.

== Government ==
Ashoro has a mayor-council form of government with a directly elected mayor and a unicameral town council of 13 members. Ashoro, as part of Tokachi Subprefecture, contributes four members to the Hokkaidō Prefectural Assembly. In terms of national politics, the town is part of the Hokkaidō 11th district of the lower house of the Diet of Japan.

== Economy ==
Agriculture and forestry are the key industries in Ashoro. Wheat, sugar beets, and beans are the representative crops. As of 2011, there are approximately 30,000 beef and dairy cows in Ashoro. That is over three times the population of Ashoro. Dairy cows make up 32% of all cattle, and Wagyu cattle 37% respectively. In 2004, Ashoro issued the "Declaration of a Town that Promotes Pasture-Based Dairy Farming" to utilize the extensive grasslands found in hilly and mountainous areas. 83% of the town's land is forested, and the local Japanese larch wood is used for new public buildings. This beautiful wood can be seen in the Town Hall and the Ashoro Junior High.

=== Biomass ===
The town government plans to build a local system that provides biomass resources and ways to use them. Ashoro produces wood pellets from untapped wood and promotes biogas plants that use livestock manure.

== Education ==
Ashoro has four public elementary schools and one public middle school operated by the town. The town has one public high school operated by the Hokkaido Board of Education. The Kyushu University Faculty of Agriculture's Hokkaido Experimental Forest is located in the town.

== Transportation ==
=== Railways ===
Ashoro has not had any passenger railway services since the closure of the Furusato Ginga Line in April 2006. The old rail station has now become a tourist landmark celebrating the town's history and significant figures.

=== Highways ===
- Dōtō Expressway
- National Route 241
- National Route 242
- National Route 274

== Sister city relations ==
- Wetaskiwin, Alberta, Canada, since 1990 "...to facilitate cross-cultural friendship and goodwill between the citizens of the city of Wetaskiwin, Alberta, and the citizens of Ashoro, Japan. In so doing, the society will encourage cultural exchanges, will promote an understanding of Japanese culture, and will facilitate the exchange of information and fellowship between groups and individuals in our respective communities." Since 1992, the Town of Ashoro has sent student study tours to Wetaskiwin every second year, but starting in 2013, all grade 10 students attending Ashoro High School have participated in the exchange. The motive behind sending all grade 10 students was to curb declining enrollments at Ashoro High School. Starting in 1994, Wetaskiwin has sent a student study tour to Ashoro every second year, with a brief lapse between 2000 and 2009. Ashoro has also, since 1992, hired a Coordinator of International Relations from the City of Wetaskiwin. The Coordinator of International Relations position was created to ease communications between Wetaskiwin and Ashoro. Responsibilities include assisting and teaching English to students aged 2–16, facilitating student exchanges, organizing and assisting with after-school and weekend programs, editing documents, and acting as a cultural liaison.

== Local attractions ==
- Ashoro Museum of Paleontology - This museum is dedicated to fossils found around Ashoro and Japan. It has a unique program that allows visitors to excavate a genuine fossil or crystal. It also offers educational programs to the youth of Ashoro.
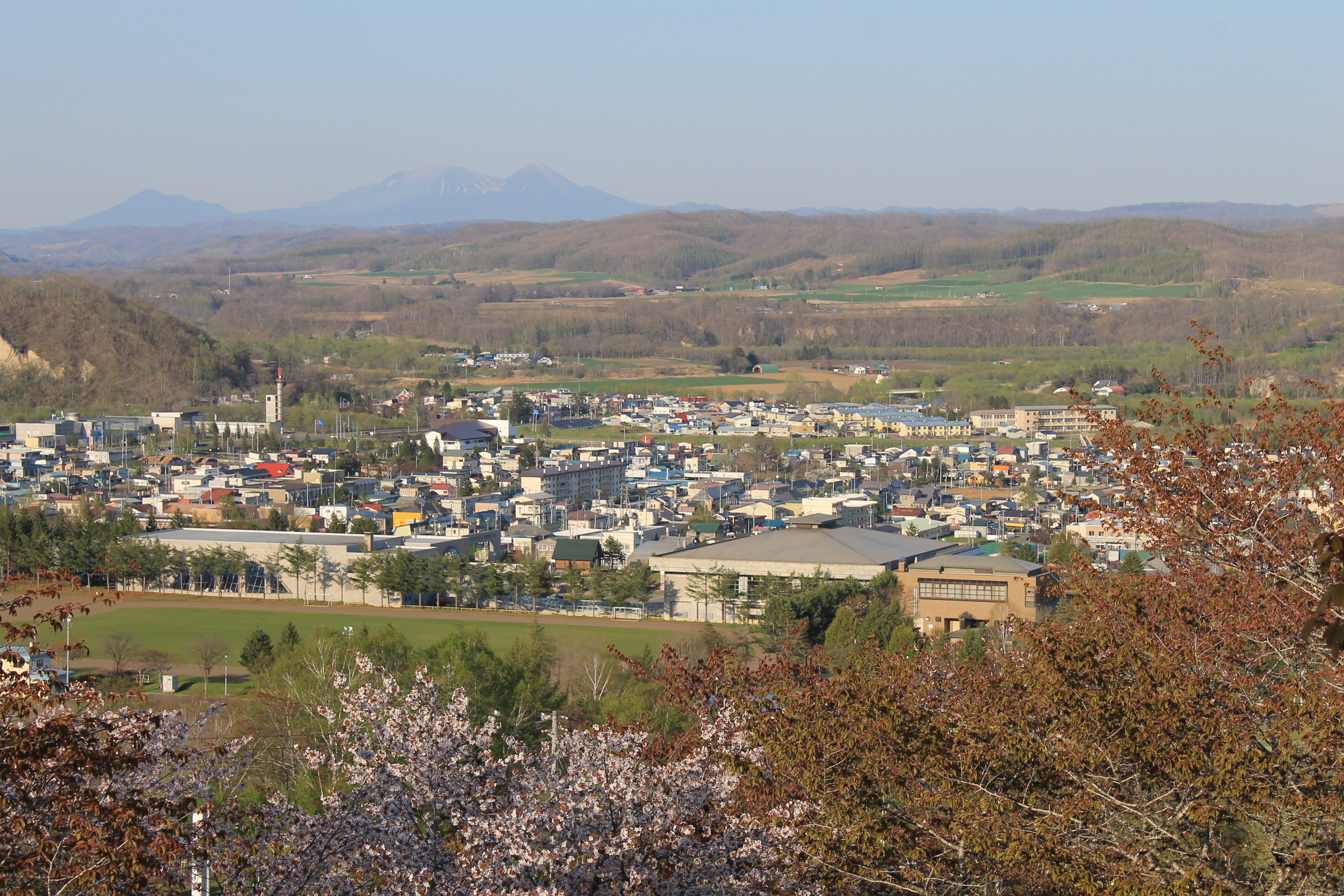
Panorama of Ashoro Town

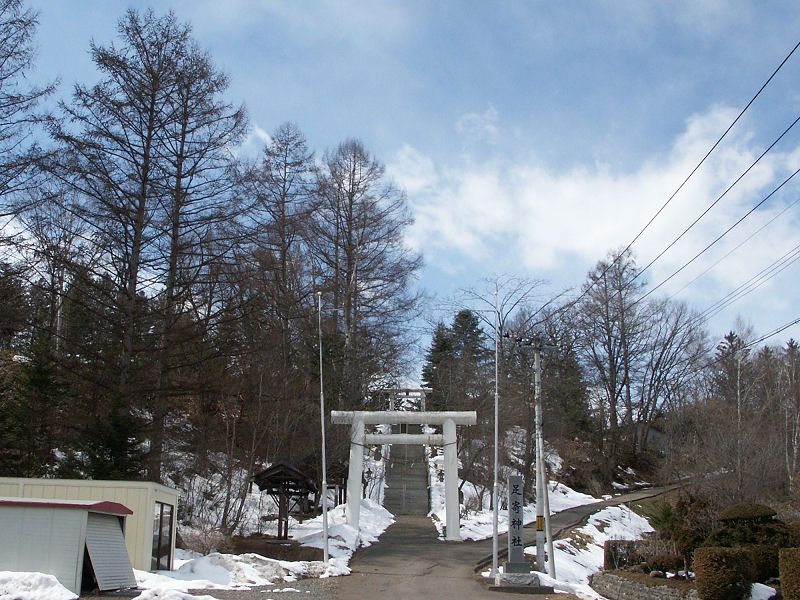
JAshoro Jinja

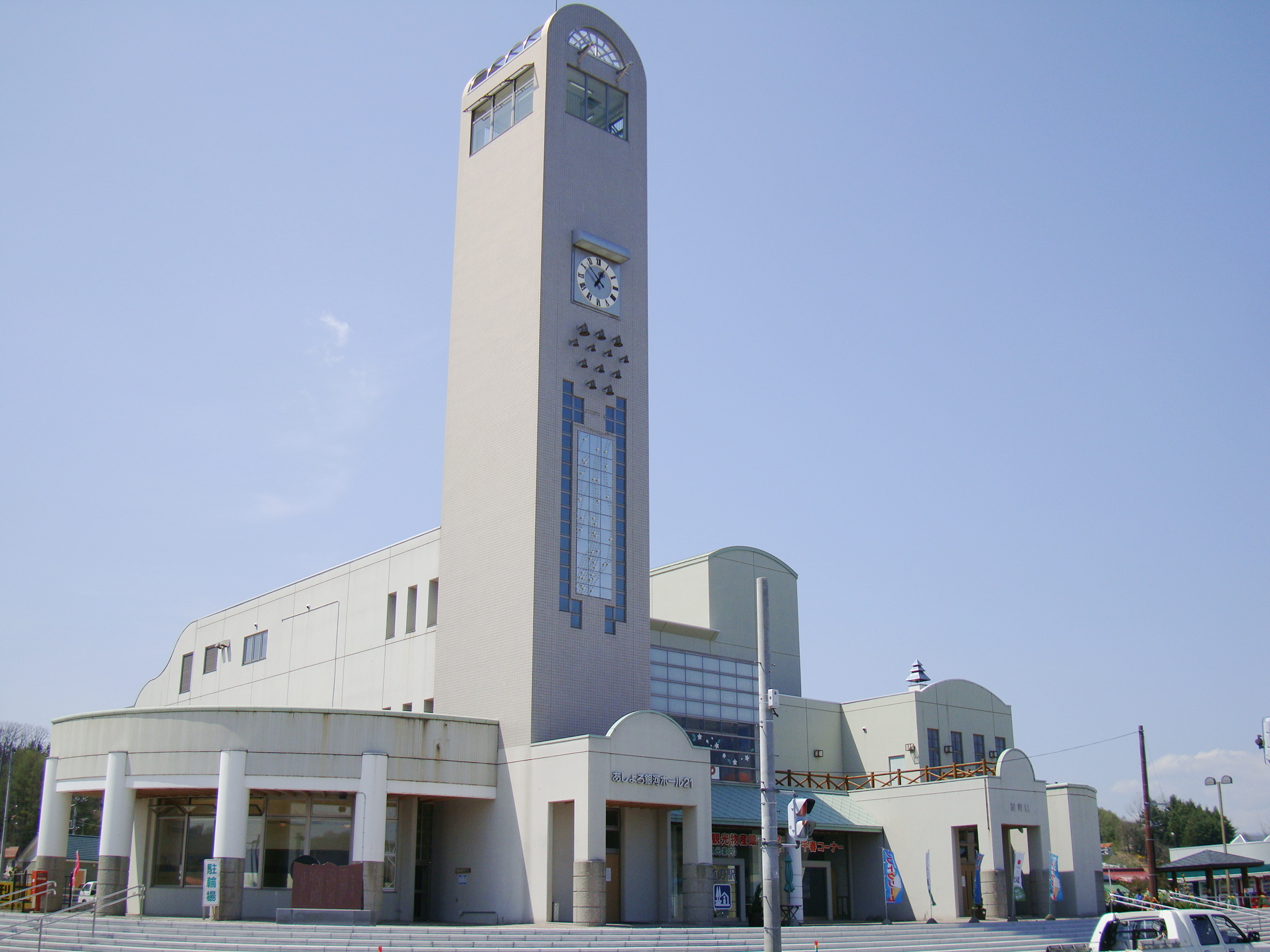
Ashoro road station (former train station)

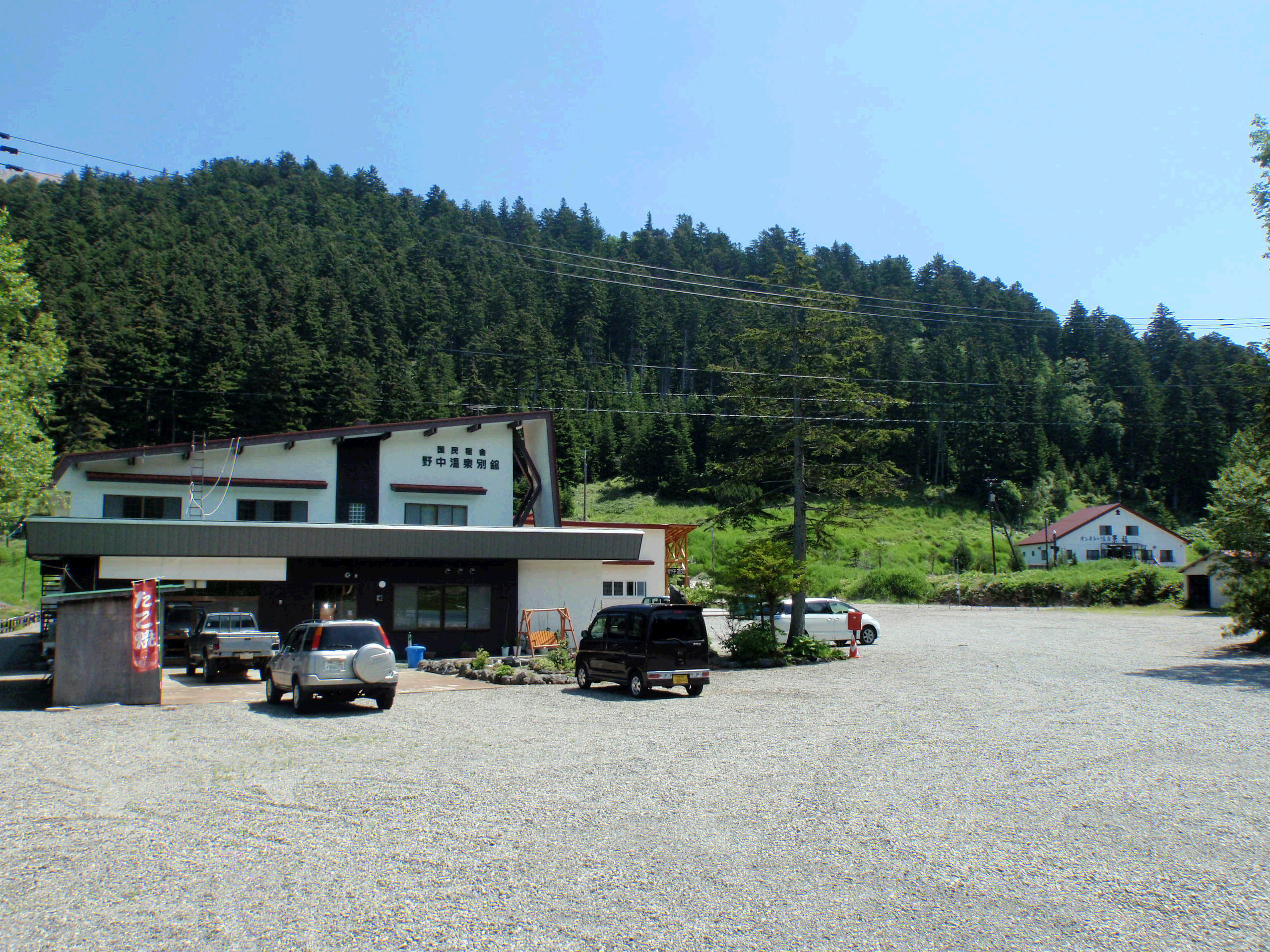
Meakan onsen

== Notable people from Ashoro ==
- Tomohiro Ishikawa - politician
- Chiharu Matsuyama - singer
- Masazō Nonaka - world's oldest living man, January 2018-January 2019
- Muneo Suzuki - politician

== Mascot ==
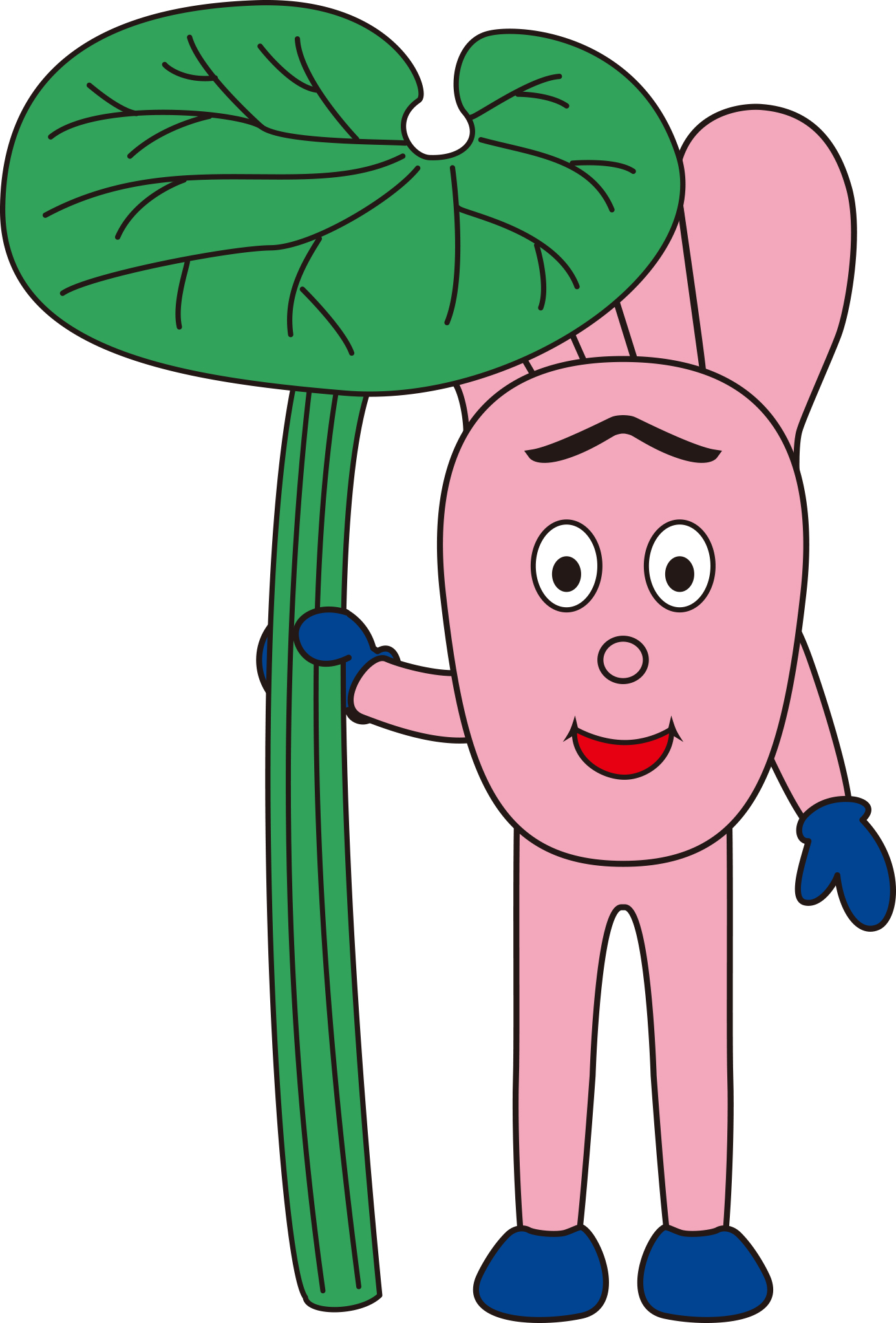
First-generation and second-generation Ayumi-chan, the town's mascots

Ashoro's official town mascot character is named Ayumi-chan (アユミちゃん), selected to promote the town in 1989. There are two generations of the mascot, and both are used today for town events.

The first generation of the mascot was used around 1990. Due to his peculiar appearance, he was unpopular with children. He can be described as a large pink right foot with large toes, and a smiling face on the shortened sole/torso, with a concerned-looking unibrow. He has long arms and legs and is wearing dark blue mittens and shoes. He is also holding a giant butterbur (rawan-buki) stalk.

Right foot Ayumi-chan was stored in a warehouse when the second generation was created. He was put away in the late 2000s and brought back in April 2021, when creepy/cute characters started gaining popularity in popular culture.

Second-generation Ayumi-chan is left-footed and is characterized as cute, friendly, and gentle. Since her appearance in the early 2010s, she has been very popular with children.

Her appearance can be described as a large, more proportionate pink foot, sparkling eyes, a friendly-looking smiling face, and short legs and arms. She is wearing green gloves and boots and is also holding a giant butterbur stalk.

Both versions of Ayumi-chan are considered athletic and take part in various town sporting events. They also make appearances at other cultural town events and play an active role on the town's social media pages.

In 2021, the town released Ayumi-chan LINE stickers of both characters for Japan's commonly used messaging app.
