= E61 =

E61 may refer to:

- Nokia E61, a smartphone
- BMW E60/E61, an automobile platform
- European route E61, an international road route
- E-61, a commercial espresso machine introduced by Faema in 1961
- King's Indian Defence, Encyclopaedia of Chess Openings code
- An ICD code for "Deficiency of other nutrient elements"
- Dōtō Expressway (spur road to Ashoro IC), Tokachi-Okhotsk Expressway and Bihoro Bypass, route E61 in Japan
