= Tokachi-Okhotsk Expressway =

Expressway in Hokkaido, Japan

Tokachi-Okhotsk Expressway
- 十勝オホーツク自動車道

Route information
- Maintained by Ministry of Land, Infrastructure, Transport and Tourism
- Length: 38.3 km (23.8 mi)
- Existed: 2013–present

Location
- Country: Japan

Highway system
- National highways of Japan; Expressways of Japan

The Tokachi-Okhotsk Expressway (十勝オホーツク自動車道, Tokachi Ohōtsuku Jidōsha-dō) is a two-lane national expressway in Tokachi Subprefecture and Okhotsk Subprefecture, Hokkaido, Japan. As of December 2018, the expressway is under construction to connect to link to the Kitami Route of the Dōtō Expressway in Ashoro. As of December 2018, it connects Rikubetsu to Kitami, the most populous city in Okhotsk Subprefecture, on the Sea of Okhotsk coast. It is owned and operated by Ministry of Land, Infrastructure, Transport and Tourism and is signed as E61 under their "2016 Proposal for Realization of Expressway Numbering."

== History ==
The first section of the expressway to open was a 5.8-kilometer (3.6 mi) long section between Kitami-higashi Interchange and Kitami-nishi Interchange on 31 March 2013. Later that year on 24 December, Kitami-chūō and Kitami-kitagami interchanges were added along the section that opened in March. On 8 November 2015, a 12-kilometer (7.5 mi) long section between Kunneppu Interchange and Kitami-nishi Interchange opened to traffic. On 9 October 2017, a 16-kilometer (9.9 mi) long section between Rikubetsu-Shōtobetsu Interchange and Kunneppu Interchange opened to traffic.

== Future ==
The Tokachi-Okhotsk Expressway is planned to have a total length of approximately 79 kilometers (49 mi) upon completion.

== Junction list ==
The entire expressway is in Hokkaido.

Location	km	mi	Exit	Name	Destinations	Notes
Through to Dōtō Expressway
Ashoro	0	0.0	1	Ashoro	National Route 242 / National Route 274 – Rikubetsu, Makubetsu	Northbound exit, southbound entrance. Tollbooth. Southern terminus
50.9 km gap in the expressway, connection is made by National Route 242
Rikubetsu	50.9	31.6	—	Rikubetsu-Shōtobetsu	National Route 242 – Rubeshibe, Ashoro	Northbound entrance, southbound exit
Kunneppu	66.9	41.6	—	Kunneppu	Hokkaido Route 143 – Rikubetsu, Kitami	
Kitami	78.9	49.0	1	Kitami-nishi	Hokkaido Route 261 – Asahikawa, Tsubetsu	
Kitami	79.9	49.6	1-1	Kitami-kitagami	Hokkaido Route 27 – Tsubetsu, Tokoro	Northbound entrance, southbound exit
Kitami	84.2	52.3	2	Kitami-chūō	Hokkaido Route 217 – Kitami Station, Bihoro	
Kitami	87.0	54.1	2-1	Kitami-Kawahigashi	Onion Road	
Kitami	89.2	55.4	3	Kitami-higashi	Hokkaido Route 1024 – Abashiri, Bihoro	Northbound exit, southbound entrance. Current northern terminus
1.000 mi = 1.609 km; 1.000 km = 0.621 mi: Electronic toll collection; Incomplete access

== See also ==
- Dōtō Expressway
