= Pippu =

Pippu 比布町
- Town
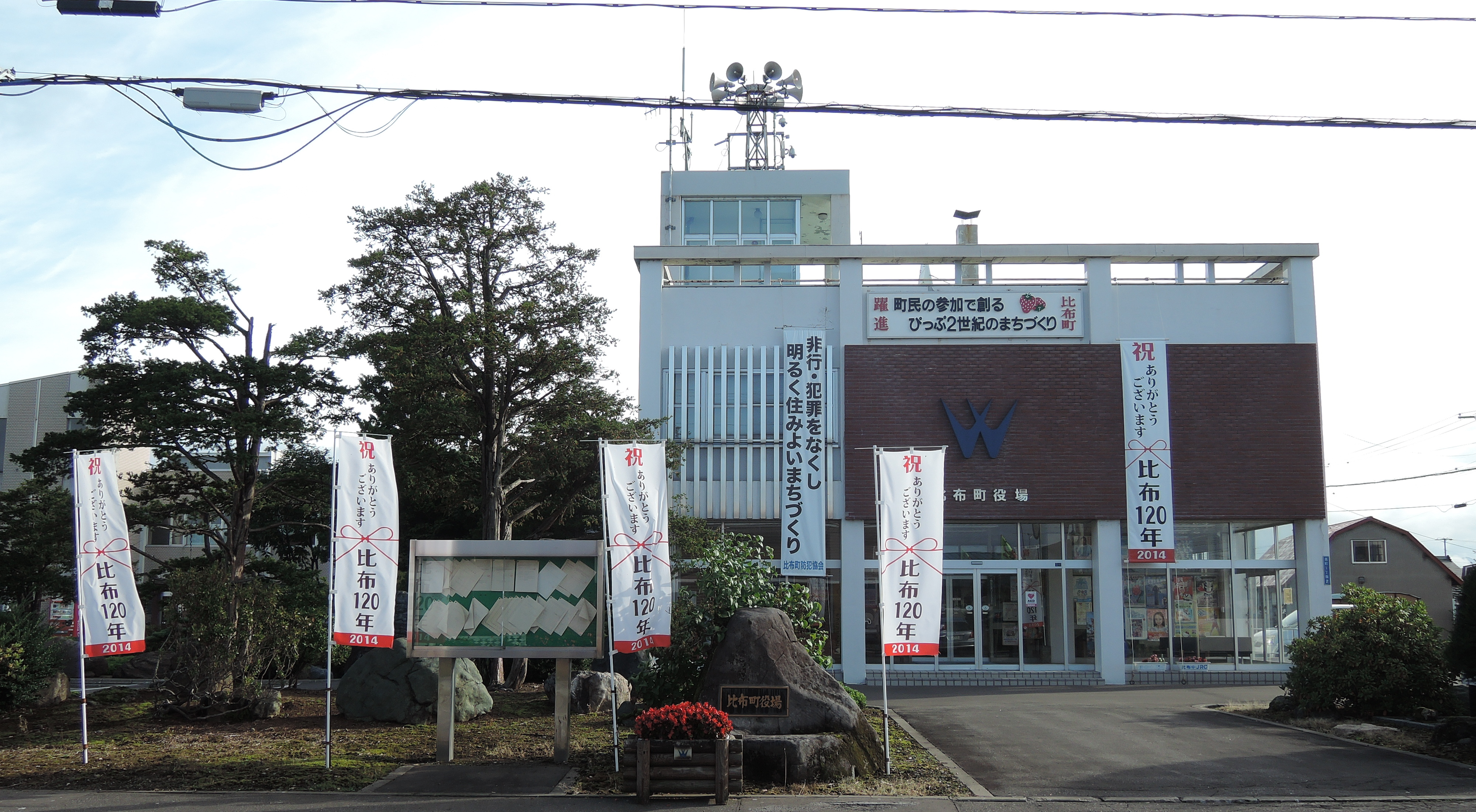
- Pippu town hall

- Flag Seal
- /0/queryThe property query is required; /0/idsThe property ids is required; /0Failed to match at least one schema; /0/titleThe property title is required; /0/serviceDoes not have a value in the enumeration ["page"]; /0Failed to match exactly one schema; /0/geometriesThe property geometries is required; /0/typeDoes not have a value in the enumeration ["GeometryCollection"]; /0/typeDoes not have a value in the enumeration ["MultiPolygon"]; /0/typeDoes not have a value in the enumeration ["Point"]; /0/typeDoes not have a value in the enumeration ["MultiPoint"]; /0/typeDoes not have a value in the enumeration ["LineString"]; /0/typeDoes not have a value in the enumeration ["MultiLineString"]; /0/typeDoes not have a value in the enumeration ["Polygon"]; /0/coordinatesThe property coordinates is required; /0/geometryThe property geometry is required; /0/typeDoes not have a value in the enumeration ["Feature"]; /0/featuresThe property features is required; /0/typeDoes not have a value in the enumeration ["FeatureCollection"]; Location of Pippu in Hokkaido (Kamikawa Subprefecture)

- Location in Japan
- Coordinates: 43°52′31″N 142°28′39″E
- Country: Japan
- Region: Hokkaido
- Prefecture: Hokkaido (Kamikawa Subprefecture)
- District: Kamikawa (Ishikari)

Area
  - Total: 86.90 km^{2} (33.55 sq mi)

Population (January 31, 2025)
  - Total: 3,413
  - Density: 39.28/km^{2} (101.7/sq mi)
- Time zone: UTC+09:00 (JST)
- City hall address: 1-2-1 Kitamachi, Pippu-cho, Kamikawa-gun, Hokkaido 078-0392
- Climate: Dfb
- Website: Official website
- Symbols
- Flower: Gentiana triflora var. japonica (Ezo Gentian)
- Tree: Fraxinus mandschurica

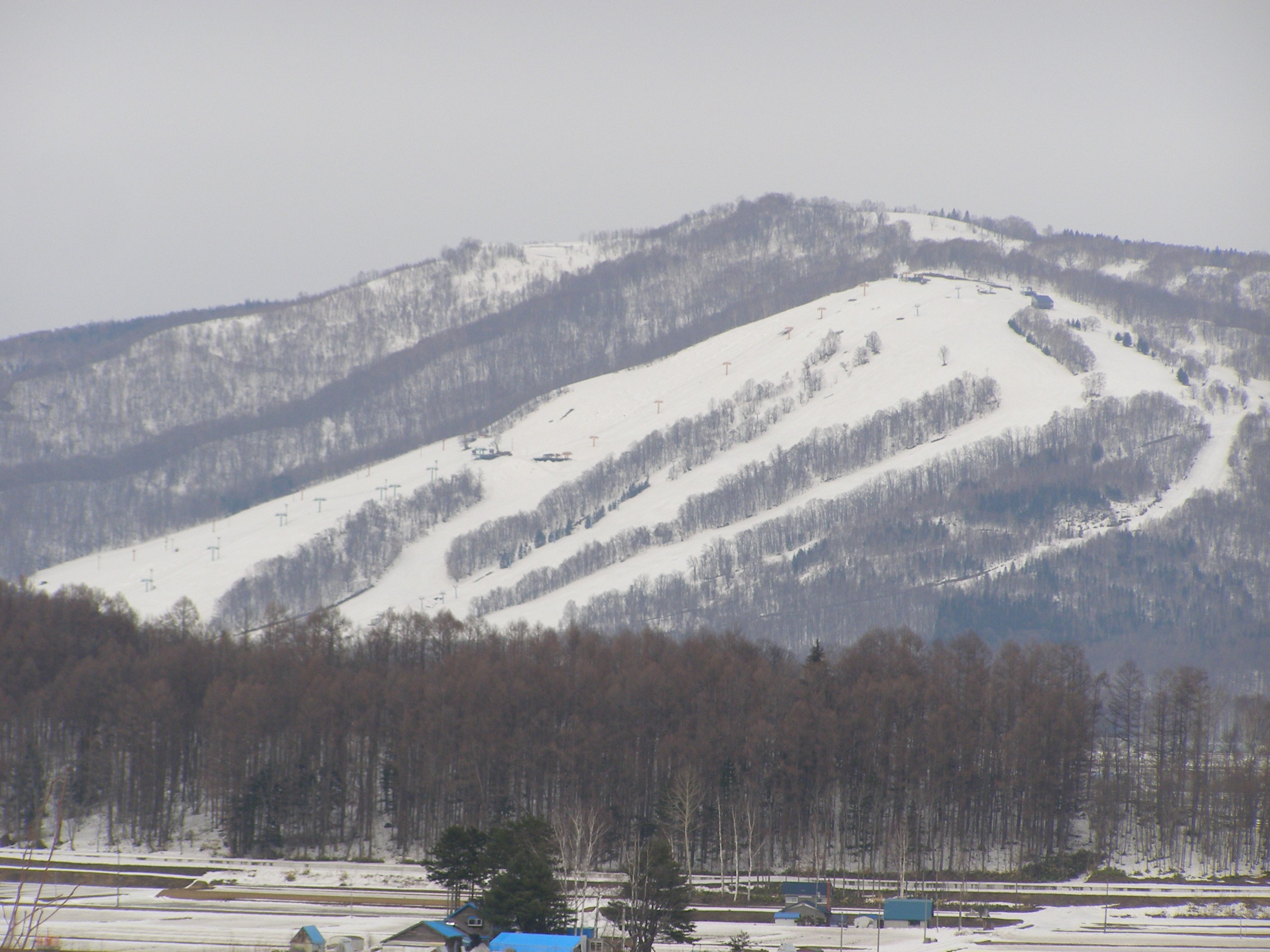
Pippu ski resort

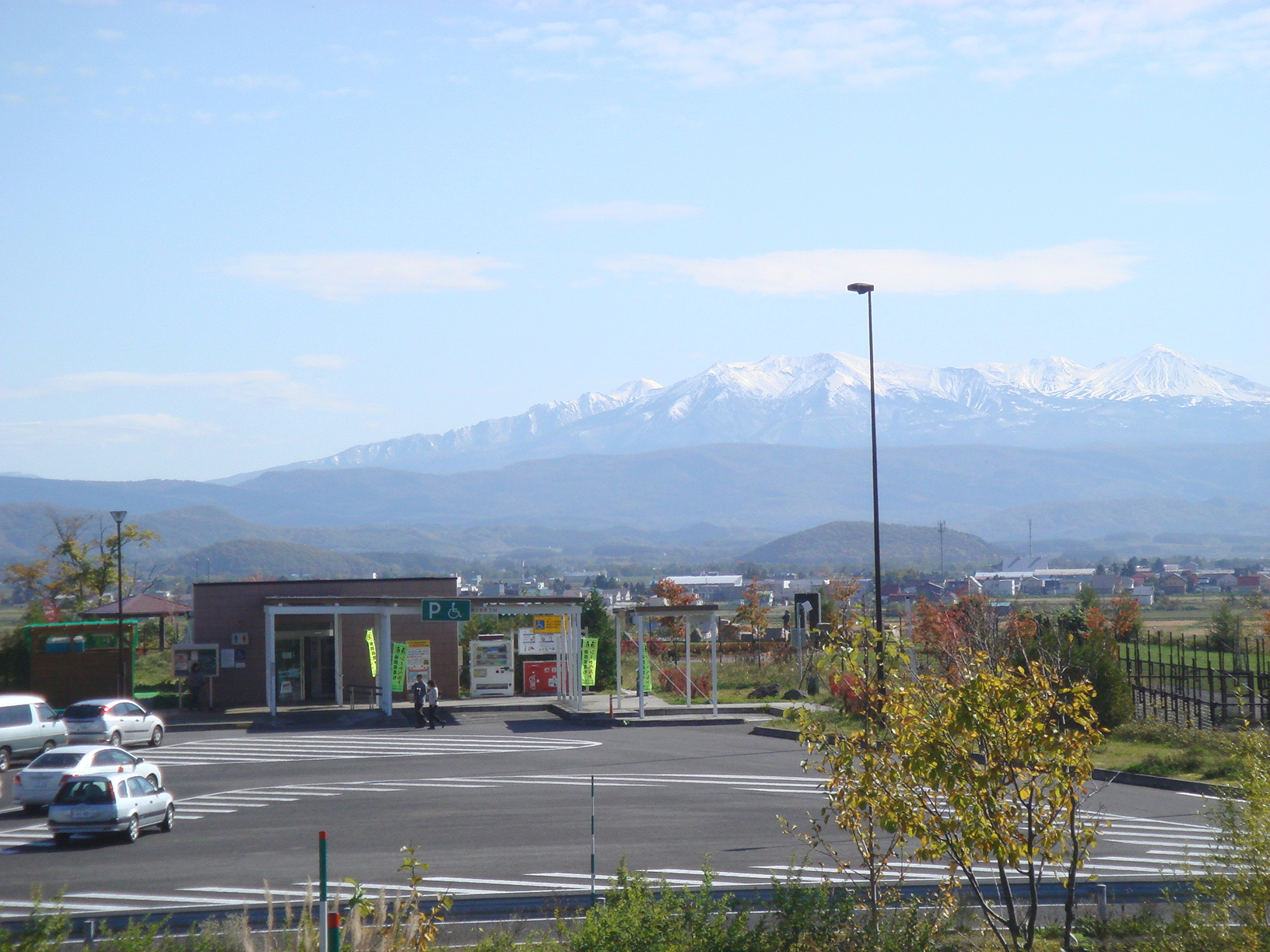
Pippu Daisetsu Parking Area

Pippu (比布町, Pippu-chō) is a town located in Kamikawa Subprefecture, Hokkaido, Japan. As of 31 January 2025, the town had an estimated population of 3,413 in 1756 households, and a population density of 21 people per km^{2}. The total area of the town is 86.90 km^{2} (33.55 sq mi). Pippu is notable for its ski slopes in winter and strawberries in summer.

== Geography ==
Pippu is located in the northwest of the Kamikawa Basin, and the Ishikari River flows along the southern border of the town. Shiokari Pass is located at the northern end of the town, which forms the border with Wassamu Town.

=== Neighbouring municipalities ===
- Hokkaido
  - Asahikawa
  - Shibetsu
  - Tōma
  - Aibetsu

== Climate ==
Pippu has a Humid continental climate (Köppen Dfb) characterized by cold summers and cold winters with heavy snowfall. The average annual temperature in Pippu is 5.7 °C. The average annual rainfall is 1336 mm with September as the wettest month. The temperatures are highest on average in August, at around 19.9 °C, and lowest in January, at around -8.4 °C.

Climate data for Pippu (1991−2020 normals, extremes 1977−present)
| Month | Jan | Feb | Mar | Apr | May | Jun | Jul | Aug | Sep | Oct | Nov | Dec | Year |
|---|---|---|---|---|---|---|---|---|---|---|---|---|---|
| Record high °C (°F) | 6.6 (43.9) | 11.1 (52.0) | 14.3 (57.7) | 28.2 (82.8) | 33.4 (92.1) | 35.9 (96.6) | 35.8 (96.4) | 36.9 (98.4) | 32.6 (90.7) | 25.3 (77.5) | 20.8 (69.4) | 12.0 (53.6) | 36.9 (98.4) |
| Mean daily maximum °C (°F) | −4.2 (24.4) | −2.6 (27.3) | 2.3 (36.1) | 10.3 (50.5) | 18.3 (64.9) | 22.8 (73.0) | 26.1 (79.0) | 26.3 (79.3) | 21.8 (71.2) | 14.5 (58.1) | 5.6 (42.1) | −1.7 (28.9) | 11.6 (52.9) |
| Daily mean °C (°F) | −8.3 (17.1) | −7.3 (18.9) | −2.5 (27.5) | 4.6 (40.3) | 11.8 (53.2) | 16.6 (61.9) | 20.4 (68.7) | 20.6 (69.1) | 15.8 (60.4) | 8.8 (47.8) | 1.7 (35.1) | −5.2 (22.6) | 6.4 (43.6) |
| Mean daily minimum °C (°F) | −13.6 (7.5) | −13.2 (8.2) | −8.0 (17.6) | −1.0 (30.2) | 5.7 (42.3) | 11.3 (52.3) | 15.7 (60.3) | 16.0 (60.8) | 10.7 (51.3) | 3.8 (38.8) | −2.1 (28.2) | −9.5 (14.9) | 1.3 (34.4) |
| Record low °C (°F) | −31.4 (−24.5) | −30.7 (−23.3) | −25.7 (−14.3) | −14.3 (6.3) | −3.4 (25.9) | 1.0 (33.8) | 5.5 (41.9) | 6.7 (44.1) | 0.0 (32.0) | −4.8 (23.4) | −19.9 (−3.8) | −26.3 (−15.3) | −31.4 (−24.5) |
| Average precipitation mm (inches) | 52.6 (2.07) | 41.7 (1.64) | 47.5 (1.87) | 48.7 (1.92) | 74.4 (2.93) | 70.7 (2.78) | 143.7 (5.66) | 154.1 (6.07) | 146.8 (5.78) | 111.0 (4.37) | 107.0 (4.21) | 80.6 (3.17) | 1,081.7 (42.59) |
| Average precipitation days (≥ 1.0 mm) | 18.2 | 14.2 | 14.1 | 11.0 | 11.6 | 9.7 | 12.1 | 12.3 | 14.1 | 16.2 | 19.1 | 21.3 | 173.9 |
| Mean monthly sunshine hours | 63.7 | 88.0 | 124.9 | 156.0 | 190.5 | 173.8 | 167.1 | 161.0 | 147.0 | 117.8 | 54.2 | 42.3 | 1,486.4 |
Source: Japan Meteorological Agency

=== Demographics ===
Per Japanese census data, the population of Pippu is as shown below. The town is in a long period of sustained population loss.

Historical population
| Year | Pop. | ±% |
|---|---|---|
| 1940 | 7,127 | — |
| 1950 | 8,129 | +14.1% |
| 1960 | 8,282 | +1.9% |
| 1970 | 6,711 | −19.0% |
| 1980 | 5,806 | −13.5% |
| 1990 | 5,004 | −13.8% |
| 2000 | 4,576 | −8.6% |
| 2010 | 4,042 | −11.7% |
| 2020 | 3,520 | −12.9% |

== History ==
The area of Pippu was part of Matsumae Domain in the Edo period. In 1895, settlers from Shiga, Ehime and Kagawa settled in the Pippu Plains. In 1906 the second-class village of Pippu was established. It became a first-class village in 1921 and was raised to town status in 1962.

== Government ==
Pippu has a mayor-council form of government with a directly elected mayor and a unicameral town council of eight members. Pippu, collectively with the other municipalities of Kawakami sub-prefecture, contributes three members to the Hokkaidō Prefectural Assembly. In terms of national politics, the town is part of the Hokkaidō 6th district of the lower house of the Diet of Japan.

== Economy ==
The economy of Pippu is overwhelmingly agricultural. Rice is the main agricultural crop, but there is also a shift to vegetables and fruits. Strawberries in particular are a local specialty.

== Education ==
Pippu has one public combined elementary/junior high school operated by the town government. The town does not have a high school.

== Transportation ==
=== Railways ===
JR Hokkaido - Sōya Main Line

■ Pippu - Ranru

=== Highways ===
- Dō-Ō Expressway
- Asahikawa-Monbetsu Expressway
- National Route 39
- National Route 40

== Culture ==
=== Mascot ===
Snowberry-chan, the town's mascot

Pippu's mascot is Snowberry-chan (スノーベリーちゃん) aka Ichigo-chan (いちごちゃん). She is a strawberry who loves skiing.
