= Japan National Route 244 =

Road in Hokkaido, Japan

National Route 244
- 国道244号
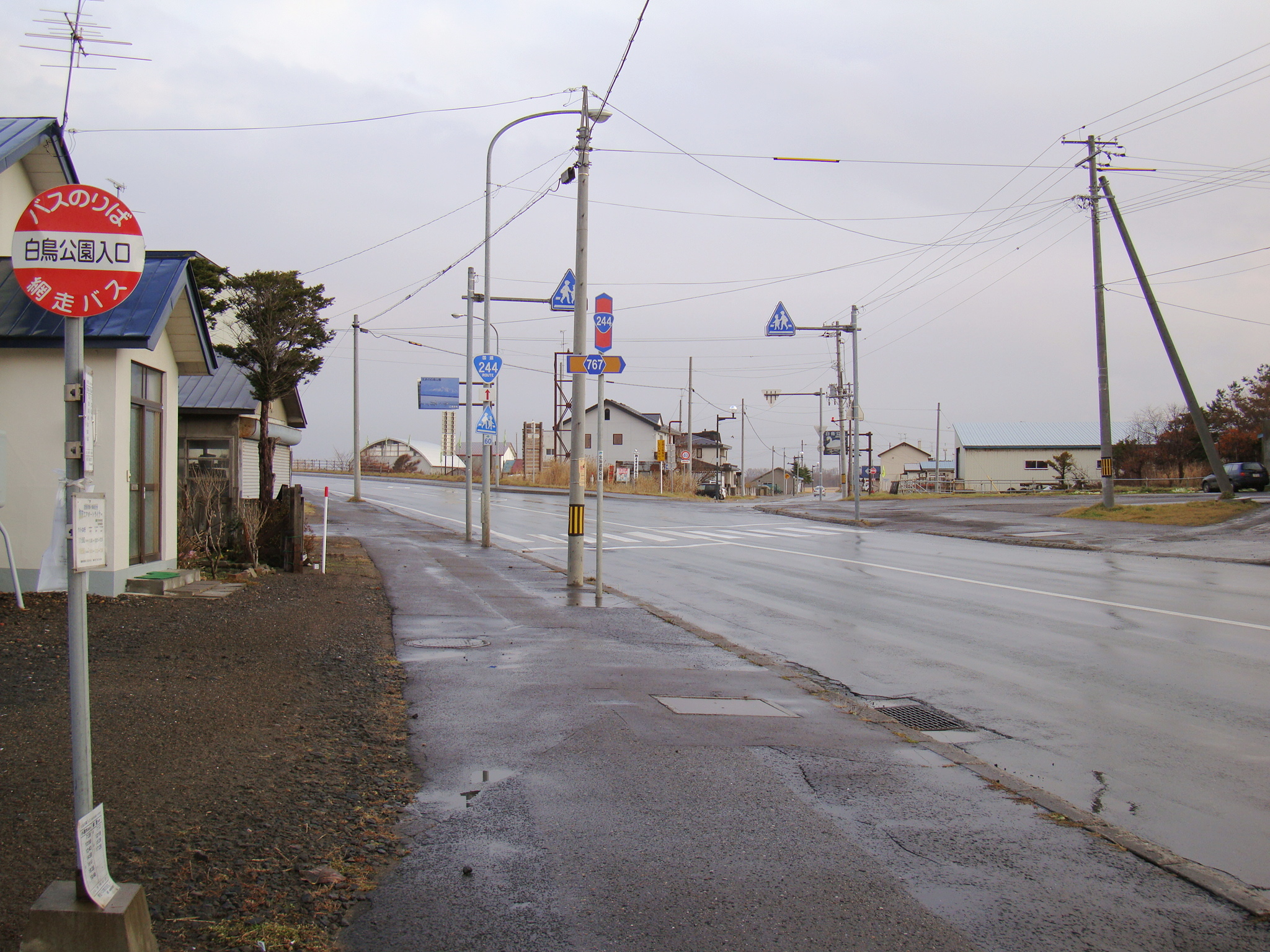

Route information
- Length: 153.9 km (95.6 mi)
- Existed: 18 May 1953–present

Major junctions
- North end: National Route 39 / National Route 240 in Abashiri
- South end: National Route 44 in Nemuro

Location
- Country: Japan

Highway system
- National highways of Japan; Expressways of Japan
← National Route 243	→ National Route 245

National Route 244 is a national highway of Japan connecting Abashiri and Nemuro in Japan, with a total length of 153.9 km (95.63 mi).
