= Rikubetsu, Hokkaido =

Town in Japan

Rikubetsu 陸別町 Rikubetsu-chō
- Town
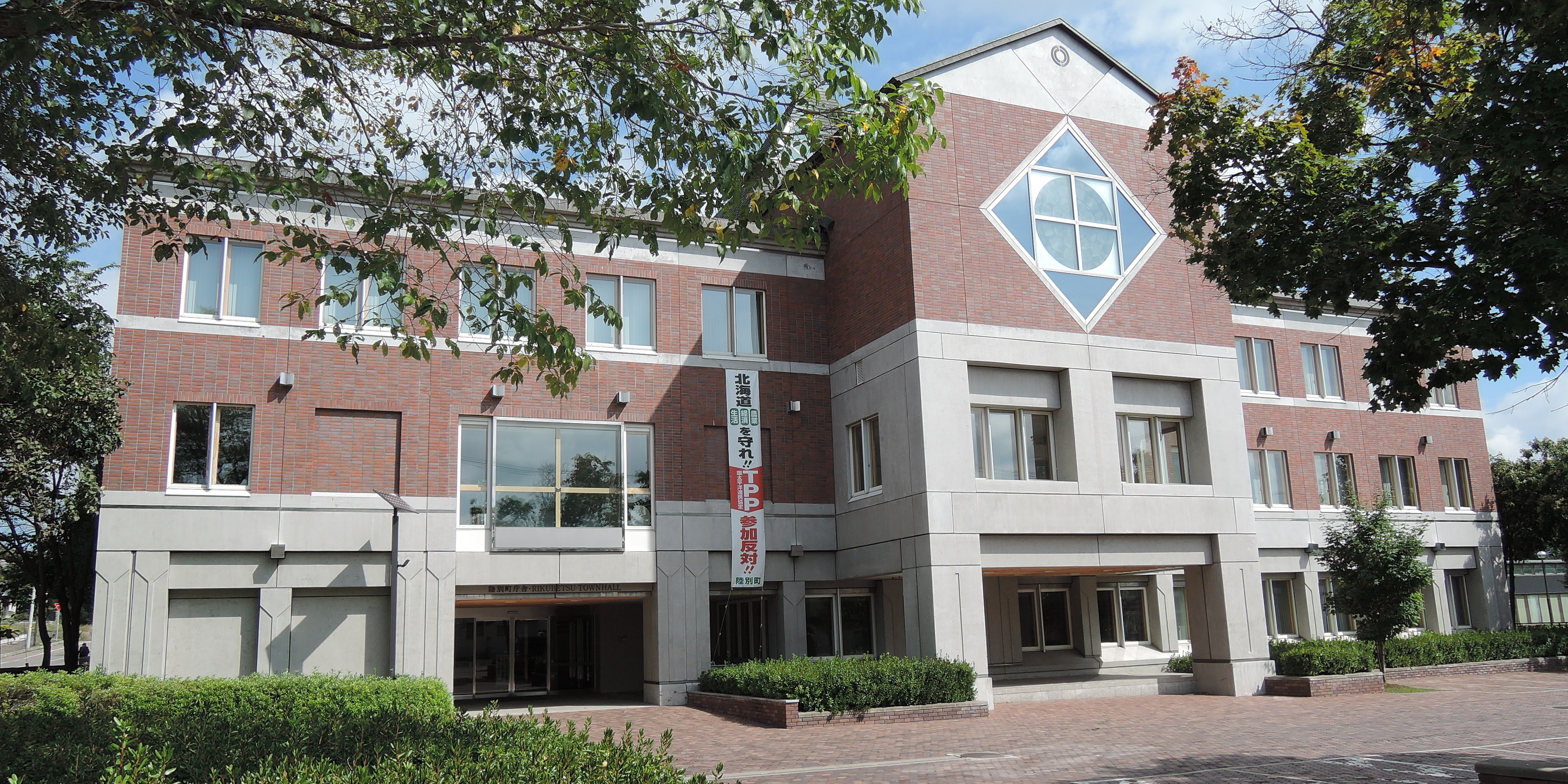
- Rikubetsu town hall

- Flag Emblem

- Location of Rikubetsu in Hokkaido (Tokachi Subprefecture)
- Interactive map of Rikubetsu
- Coordinates: 43°28′08″N 143°44′50″E
- Country: Japan
- Region: Hokkaido
- Prefecture: Hokkaido (Tokachi Subprefecture)
- District: Ashoro

Area
  - Total: 608.90 km^{2} (235.10 sq mi)

Population (December 31, 2025)
  - Total: 2,044
  - Density: 3.357/km^{2} (8.694/sq mi)
- Time zone: UTC+09:00 (JST)
- City hall address: Rikubetsu-Higashi 1-3-1, Rikubetsu-cho, Ashoro-gun, Hokkaido 089-4311
- Climate: Dfb
- Website: www.rikubetsu.jp
- Symbols
- Bird: Common cuckoo
- Flower: Adonis ramosa
- Tree: Japanese white birch

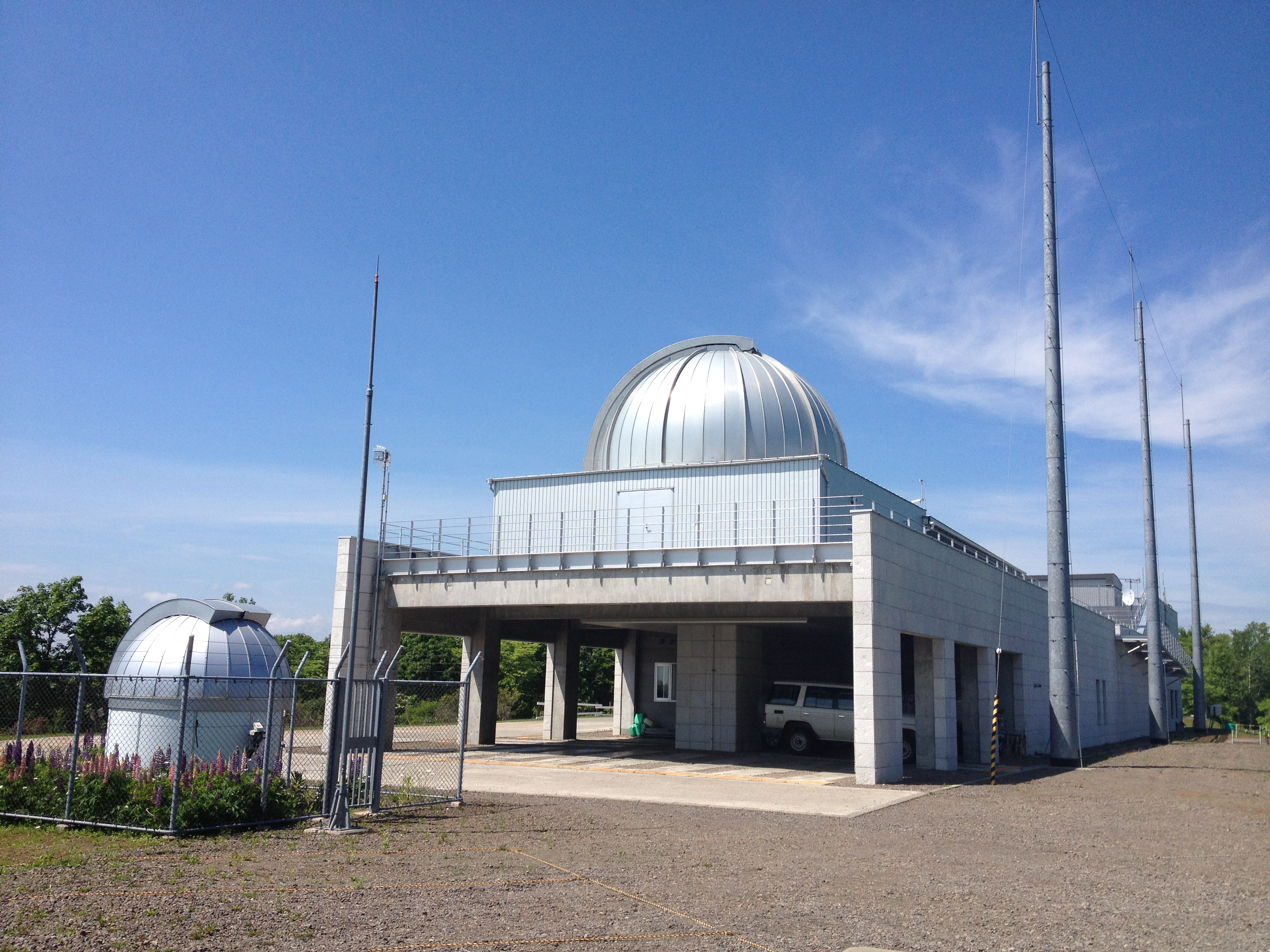
Rikubetsu Earth and Space Science Museum

Rikubetsu (陸別町, Rikubetsu-chō) is a town located in Tokachi Subprefecture, Hokkaidō, Japan. As of 31 December 2025, the town had an estimated population of 2,044 in 1221 households, and a population density of 3 people per km^{2}. The total area of the town is 608.90 km^{2} (235.10 sq mi). Rikubetsu, is a popular tourist destination, boasting the title "Japan's coldest town."

== Geography ==
Rikubetsu is located in southeastern Hokkaido in the northeastern part of the Tokachi Subprefecture. Rikubetsu is divided into two topographical zones by the Tobetsu River, which flows north–south through the center of the region. The western part is a highland plateau and is a center of dairy farming, while the eastern part is a plateau area with an elevation of approximately 500 meters. The town is located between 143°57' and 143°27' east longitude and 43°38' and 43°20' north latitude. The town hall is located at 143°45'8" east longitude and 43°28'1" north latitude, with an elevation of 205.8 meters. Mount Kitoushi at 1,321 meters is the highest point in town.

=== Neighboring municipalities ===
  - Ashoro
  - Oketo
  - Kunneppu
  - Tsubetsu

=== Demographics ===
Per Japanese census data, the population of Rikubetsu has declined in recent decades.

Historical population
Year	Pop.	±%
1970	6,839	—
1980	5,002	−26.9%
1990	3,902	−22.0%
2000	3,228	−17.3%
2010	2,650	−17.9%
2020	2,264	−14.6%

== Climate ==
According to the Köppen climate classification, Rikubetsu has a humid continental/humid subarctic climate(Dfb). It receives a lot of snow and is designated a heavy snow zone. The average annual temperature is 4.8 °C. The average daily temperature is below freezing from December to March. Rikubetsu is ranked as Japan's coldest area. Daily mean temperature in January is −11.4 °C (11.5 °F), the average low temperature in the end of January and beginning of February are below −20 °C (−4.0 °F), which are the coldest in Japan

Climate data for Rikubetsu (elevation 210 m, 1991–2020 normals, extremes 1977–present)
Month	Jan	Feb	Mar	Apr	May	Jun	Jul	Aug	Sep	Oct	Nov	Dec	Year
Record high °C (°F)	6.6 (43.9)	13.9 (57.0)	17.4 (63.3)	29.3 (84.7)	37.8 (100.0)	35.5 (95.9)	36.6 (97.9)	35.1 (95.2)	32.8 (91.0)	27.8 (82.0)	20.0 (68.0)	12.9 (55.2)	37.8 (100.0)
Mean daily maximum °C (°F)	−2.5 (27.5)	−1.4 (29.5)	3.2 (37.8)	10.5 (50.9)	17.1 (62.8)	20.6 (69.1)	23.7 (74.7)	24.4 (75.9)	20.8 (69.4)	14.7 (58.5)	7.1 (44.8)	−0.2 (31.6)	11.5 (52.7)
Daily mean °C (°F)	−11.1 (12.0)	−9.6 (14.7)	−3.1 (26.4)	4.0 (39.2)	10.1 (50.2)	14.4 (57.9)	18.3 (64.9)	19.1 (66.4)	14.9 (58.8)	7.9 (46.2)	0.7 (33.3)	−7.7 (18.1)	4.8 (40.6)
Mean daily minimum °C (°F)	−19.6 (−3.3)	−18.8 (−1.8)	−10.6 (12.9)	−2.5 (27.5)	3.4 (38.1)	9.1 (48.4)	14.0 (57.2)	15.0 (59.0)	9.8 (49.6)	1.8 (35.2)	−5.3 (22.5)	−14.9 (5.2)	−1.6 (29.1)
Record low °C (°F)	−33.2 (−27.8)	−33.1 (−27.6)	−27.6 (−17.7)	−19.1 (−2.4)	−7.2 (19.0)	−2.1 (28.2)	2.1 (35.8)	4.2 (39.6)	−2.4 (27.7)	−9.2 (15.4)	−20.9 (−5.6)	−27.6 (−17.7)	−33.2 (−27.8)
Average precipitation mm (inches)	33.7 (1.33)	20.1 (0.79)	38.4 (1.51)	54.2 (2.13)	71.5 (2.81)	67.6 (2.66)	106.0 (4.17)	137.0 (5.39)	121.5 (4.78)	83.4 (3.28)	47.7 (1.88)	42.8 (1.69)	831.8 (32.75)
Average snowfall cm (inches)	97 (38)	74 (29)	80 (31)	25 (9.8)	2 (0.8)	0 (0)	0 (0)	0 (0)	0 (0)	1 (0.4)	20 (7.9)	86 (34)	386 (152)
Average precipitation days (≥ 1.0 mm)	7.0	5.7	8.6	9.8	9.9	9.0	10.0	11.1	10.6	9.1	7.9	7.8	107.1
Average snowy days (≥ 5 cm)	5.6	3.9	4.9	1.5	0.1	0.0	0.0	0.0	0.0	0.1	1.3	5.4	22.9
Mean monthly sunshine hours	151.2	150.2	172.5	168.8	170.8	144.5	128.1	121.6	136.8	157.9	144.1	145.6	1,792
Source: Japan Meteorological Agency (1991–2020 normals, extremes 1977–present)

== History ==
The first Japanese settlers arrived in the area in 1901. Tomamu was established as a second-class village in April 1923. It was renamed Rikubetsu in August 1949. It was raised to town status in September 1953.

== Government ==
Rikubetsu has a mayor-council form of government with a directly elected mayor and a unicameral town council of eight members. Rikubetsu, as part of Tokachi Subprefecture, contributes four members to the Hokkaidō Prefectural Assembly. In terms of national politics, the town is part of the Hokkaidō 11th district of the lower house of the Diet of Japan.

== Economy ==
Agriculture, forestry, and dairy farming are the main pillars of the local economy. Nissan Motors operates the Hokkaido Rikubetsu Proving Ground in the town.

== Education ==
Rikubetsu has one public elementary school and one public middle school operated by the town. The town does not have a high school. The Solar-Terrestrial Environment Laboratory, Nagoya University is located in Rikubetsu.

== Transportation ==
=== Railways ===
Rikubetsu has not had any passenger railway services since the closure of the Furusato Ginga Line in April 2006.

=== Highways ===
- Tokachi-Okhotsk Expressway
- National Route 242

== Sister city relations ==
- Lacombe, Alberta, Canada

== Local attractions ==
- Yukuepira Chashi Ruins, National Historic Site
- Rikubetsu Earth and Space Science Museum
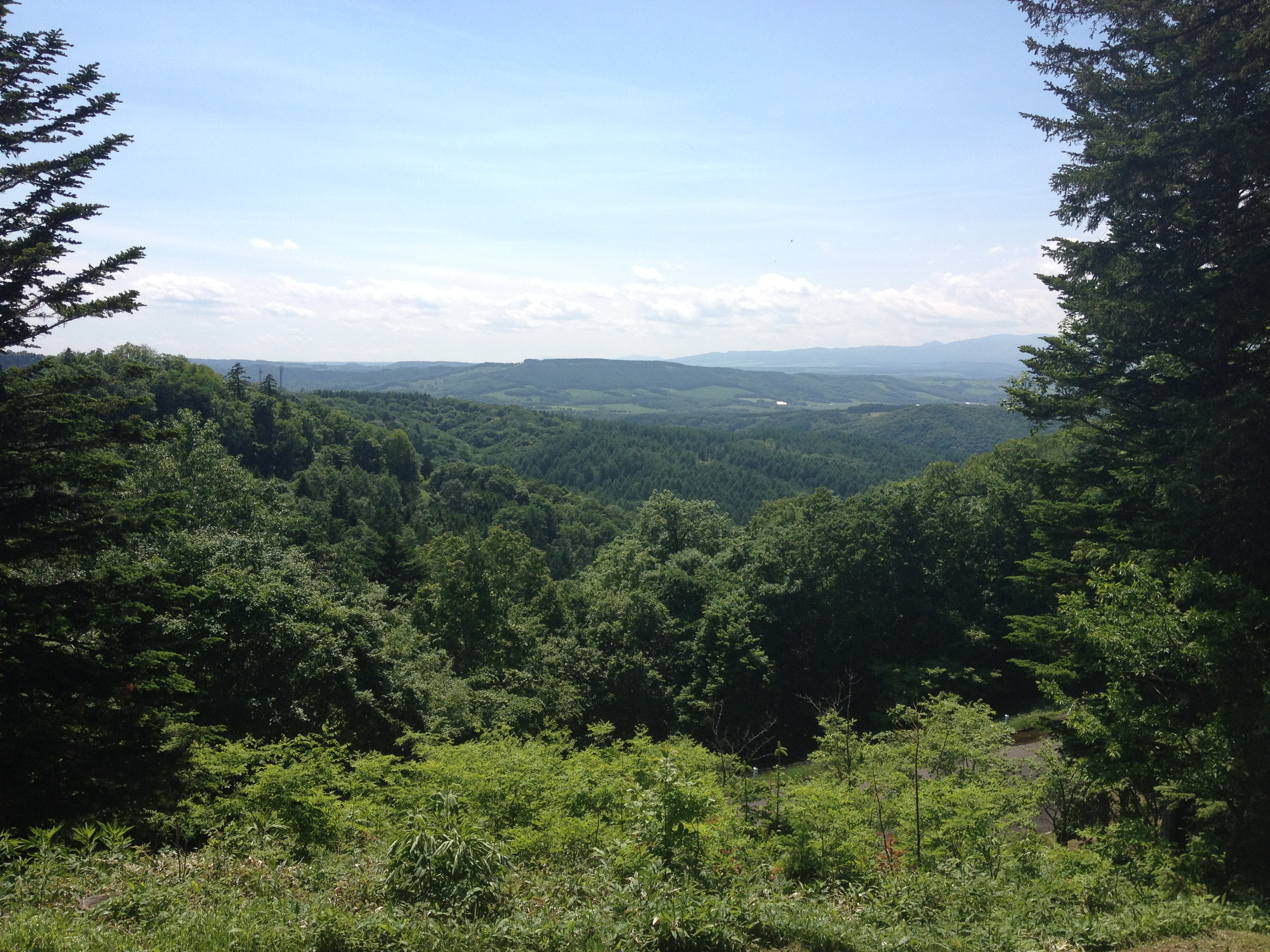
Rikubetsu - panorama

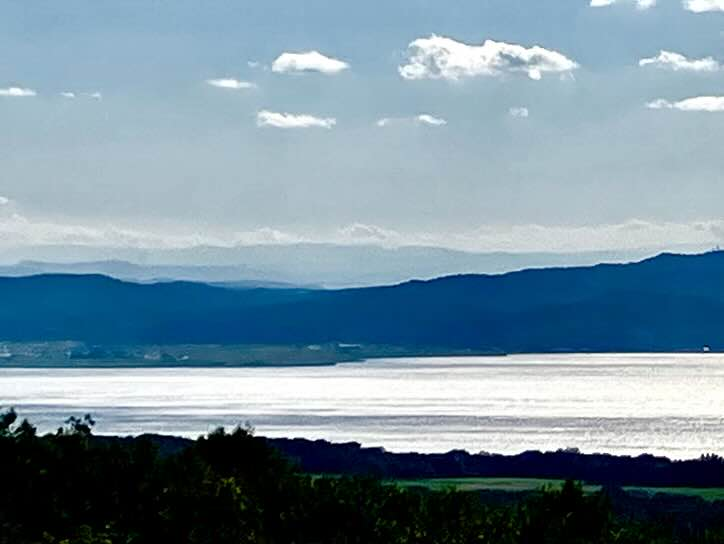
Mt. Higashimikuni

== Mascots ==
Shibare-kun and Tsurara-chan, the town's mascots

Rikubetsu's mascots are Shibare-kun (しばれ君) and Tsurara-chan (つららちゃん).

- Shibare-kun is a Siberian boy from the Amur River area. He sailed to Japan through the trails of drift ice. He carries a thermometer to remind everyone that Rikubetsu is Japan's coldest place.
- Tsurara-chan is a Canadian girl. She flew to Japan through the path of the aurora borealis. Her goal is to prevent climate change.
