= Asahikawa-Monbetsu Expressway =

Road in Hokkaido, Japan

Asahikawa-Monbetsu Expressway
- 旭川紋別自動車道

Route information
- Maintained by Ministry of Land, Infrastructure, Transport and Tourism
- Length: 98.5 km (61.2 mi)
- Existed: 2002–present
- Component highways: National Route 450

Major junctions
- West end: Pippu Junction; Dō-Ō Expressway in Pippu
- East end: Engaru Interchange; National Route 333 in Engaru

Location
- Country: Japan

Highway system
- National highways of Japan; Expressways of Japan
← National Route 449	→ National Route 451

The Asahikawa-Monbetsu Expressway (旭川紋別自動車道, Asahikawa-Monbetsu Jidōshadō) is an incomplete national expressway in Hokkaido connecting Asahikawa, Hokkaidō and Monbetsu, Hokkaidō for a total length of 130 km. It is owned and operated by the Ministry of Land, Infrastructure, Transport and Tourism (MLIT). The route is signed E39 under MLIT's "2016 Proposal for Realization of Expressway Numbering" and also as National Route 450.

== History ==
In 2017, the Asahi-Monbetsu Expressway was the first expressway in Hokkaido to receive signage for the expressway numbering system.
