= Dō-Ō Expressway =

Expressway in Hokkaido, Japan

Hokkaido Expressway
- 道央自動車道, 道央道

Route information
- Length: 413.6 km (257.0 mi)
- Existed: 1971–present

Major junctions
- From: Ōnuma Kōen Interchange in Mori, Hokkaido; Hokkaido Route 149
- To: Shibetsu-Kenbuchi Interchange in Kenbuchi, Hokkaido; National Route 40

Location
- Country: Japan
- Major cities: Muroran, Tomakomai, Chitose, Sapporo, Fukagawa, Asahikawa

Highway system
- National highways of Japan; Expressways of Japan

The Dō-Ō Expressway (道央自動車道, Dōō Jidōsha-dō) is a national expressway in Hokkaido, Japan. It is owned and operated by East Nippon Expressway Company.

== Naming ==
The road is named the Dō-Ō Expressway (lit. "Central Hokkaidō Expressway") in Japanese; however, it's also known as the Hokkaido Expressway.

Officially the expressway is designated as the Hakodate-Nayoro Route (函館名寄線) of the Hokkaidō Jūkan Expressway. The name Jūkan (縦貫; "lengthways") distinguishes it from the Trans-Hokkaido Expressway, the Ōdan (横断; "transverse").

== Route description ==
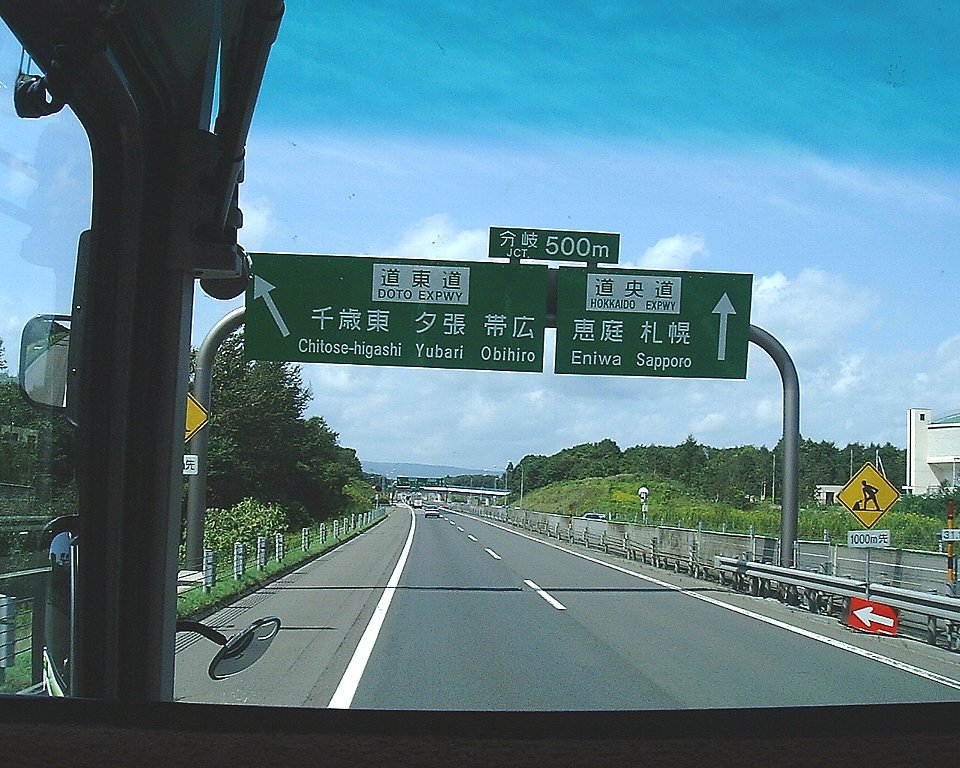
Chitose-Eniwa Junction September 2002

The expressway connects the north of Hokkaido with the south via the city of Sapporo. Extension of the expressway in the north towards the city of Wakkanai and in the south towards the city of Hakodate is underway; although the Hokkaido Expressway itself is not planned to extend as far as these two cities, various expressway-standard roads (bypasses of National Route 40 to the north and National Route 5 to the south) will cover the remaining distances.

Some unfinished sections of the expressway (Shibetsu-Kenbuchi Interchange to Nayoro Interchange in the north and Ōnuma Interchange to Nanae Interchange in the south) will be constructed according to the New Direct Control System. These sections are expected to operate toll-free upon completion.

The section from Sapporo-minami Interchange through Sapporo Junction to Sapporo-nishi Interchange on the Sasson Expressway is built to an urban expressway standard and the tolls are charged at a flat rate. As of March 2008 the toll on this section is 400 yen for regular passenger cars. Tolls on all other sections of the expressway are assessed according to distance travelled in the same manner as most other national expressways.

== History ==
- 4 December 1971 - Kitahiroshima Interchange - Chitose Interchange section opened.
- 19 September 1972 - Kitahiroshima Interchange - Chitose Interchange section expanded to 4 lanes.
- 24 October 1978 - Chitose Interchange - Tomakomai-higashi Interchange section opened.
- 29 October 1979 - Sapporo-minami Interchange - Kitahiroshima Interchange section opened.
- 29 October 1980 - Tomakomai-higashi Interchange - Tomakomai-nishi Interchange section opened.
- 9 November 1983 - Sapporo Interchange - Iwamizawa Interchange section opened.
- 30 November 1983 - Tomakomai-nishi Interchange - Shiraoi Interchange section opened.
- 18 October 1985 - Shiraoi Interchange - Noboribetsu-higashi Interchange section opened.
- 25 October 1985 - Sapporo Interchange - Sapporo-minami Interchange section opened.
- 9 October 1986 - Noboribetsu-higashi Interchange - Noboribetsu Muroran Interchange section opened.
- 18 September 1987 - Iwamizawa Interchange - Bibai Interchange section opened. Mikasa and Bibai Interchanges become the first in Japan to implement automated ticket dispensers at toll gates.
- 8 October 1988 - Bibai Interchange - Takikawa Interchange section opened.
- 12 September 1989 - Takikawa Interchange - Fukagawa Interchange section opened.
- 30 October 1990 - Fukagawa Interchange - Asahikawa Takasu Interchange section opened (originally 2 lanes, expansion to 4 lanes completed in 2004).
- 26 April 1991 - Highway Oasis opened at Sunagawa Service Area (at that time the second in Japan in first in Hokkaido).
- 25 October 1991 - Noboribetsu Muroran Interchange - Muroran Interchange section opened.
- 30 September 1992 - Sapporo Junction is opened, connecting with the Sasson Expressway.
- 27 October 1992 - Muroran Interchange - Date Interchange section opened.
- 30 March 1994 - Date Interchange - Abuta Tōyako Interchange section opened.
- 22 October 1997 - Abuta Tōyako Interchange - Oshamanbe Interchange section opened.
- 23 March 1998 - Connection with the Hidaka Expressway is completed at Tomakomai-higashi Interchange.
- 11 April 1998 - Fukagawa Junction is opened, connecting with the Fukagawa-Rumoi Expressway.
- 7 October 1999 - Chitose-Eniwa Junction is opened, connecting with the Dōtō Expressway.
- November 1999 - Chitose-bound exit opened at Sapporo-minami Interchange.
- 29 March 29, 2000 - Date Interchange - Toyoura Interchange section closed due to risk of eruption from nearby Mount Usu.
- 13 July 2000 - Temporary Abuta Tōyako Interchange opened, allowing access to Toyoura Interchange.
- 4 October 2000 - Asahikawa Takasu Interchange - Wassamu Interchange section opened.
- 9 February 2001 - Date Interchange - Toyoura Interchange section reopened.
- 30 June 2001 - Temporary Abuta Tōyako Interchange closed due to full reopening of expressway.
- 10 September 2001 - Asahikawa-bound entrance opened at Sapporo-minami Interchange.
- 17 October 2001 - Fukagawa Interchange - Otoe Parking Area section expanded to 4 lanes.
- 19 November 2001 - Oshamanbe Interchange - Kunnui Interchange section opened.
- 30 September 2003 - Otoe Parking Area - Asahikawa Takasu Interchange section expanded to 4 lanes.
- 4 October 2003 - Wassamu Interchange - Shibetsu-Kenbuchi Interchange section opened.
- 27 March 2004 - Pippu Junction is opened, connecting with the Asahikawa-Monbetsu Expressway.
- 18 November 2006 - Kunnui Interchange - Yakumo Interchange section opened.
- 21 December 2007 - Abuta Tōyako Interchange is moved to a new location to meet the rebuilt National Route 230.
- 10 October 2009 - Yakumo Interchange - Otoshibe Interchange section opened.
- 26 November 2011 - Otoshibe Interchange - Mori Interchange section opened.
- 10 November 2012 - Mori Interchange - Ōnuma Kōen Interchange section opened.
- 3 August 2013 - New Chitose Airport Interchange opened.
- 13 December 2020 - Tomakomai-chūō Interchange opened.

== List of interchanges and features ==
- IC - interchange, JCT - junction, SA - service area, PA - parking area, BS - bus stop, SIC - smart interchange, TB - toll gate

=== Southern route (Sapporo JCT - Nanae IC) ===
| No. | Name | Connections | Dist. from Sapporo Junction | Bus stop | Notes | Location (all in Hokkaido) |
|---|---|---|---|---|---|---|
| 32 | Sapporo Junction | Northern Route; Sasson Expressway | 0.0 | | | Shiroishi-ku, Sapporo |
| 31 | Kitagō Interchange | National Route 274 (Sapporo Shindō) | 1.6 | | Asahikawa-bound exit, Tomakomai-bound entrance only | Shiroishi-ku, Sapporo |
| 30 | Ōyachi Interchange | National Route 274 (Sapporo Shindō) | 3.6 | | Tomakomai-bound exit, Asahikawa-bound entrance only | Shiroishi-ku, Sapporo |
| 29 TB | Sapporo-minami Interchange | Sapporo Shindō | 7.4 | | | Kiyota-ku, Sapporo |
| 28 | Kitahiroshima Interchange | National Route 36 | 11.9 | | | Kitahiroshima |
| 27 PA SIC | Wattsu Parking Area | City Route (Hiroshima Wattsu Route) | 16.0 | O | | Kitahiroshima |
| BS | Kita-Eniwa Bus Stop | | | | Paused | Eniwa |
| 26 | Eniwa Interchange | Pref. Route 117 (Eniwadake Kōen Route) | 25.8 | O | | Eniwa |
| 25 | Chitose-Eniwa Junction | Dōtō Expressway | 29.8 | | | Chitose |
| 24 | Chitose Interchange | Pref. Route 77 (Chitose Inter Route) | 34.8 | | | Chitose |
| 23 | New Chitose Airport Interchange | Pref. Route 1175 (New Chitose Airport Inter Route) | 38.8 | | | Chitose |
| PA | Misawa Parking Area | | 41.4 | | | Tomakomai |
| 22 | Tomakomai-higashi Interchange/ Tomakomai-higashi Junction | Hidaka Expressway; Pref. Route 91 (Tomakomai-higashi Inter Route) | 46.7 | | | Tomakomai |
| BS | Takaoka Bus Stop | | | | Abolished | Tomakomai |
| 21 | Tomakomai-chūō Interchange | Pref. Route 1179 (Tomakomai-chūō Inter Route) | 56.2 | | | Tomakomai |
| 20 | Tomakomai-nishi Interchange | Pref. Route 141 (Tarumae Nishikioka Route) | 64.3 | | | Tomakomai |
| SA | Tarumae Service Area | | 67.4 | | | Tomakomai |
| 19 | Shiraoi Interchange | Pref. Route 86 (Shiraoi Ōtaki Route) | 80.1 | | | Shiraoi |
| PA | Hagino Parking Area | | 84.9 | | | Shiraoi |
| BS | Takeura Bus Stop | | 89.7 | O | | Shiraoi |
| 18 | Noboribetsu-higashi Interchange | Pref. Route 2 (Tōyako Noboribetsu Route) | 98.7 | | | Noboribetsu |
| PA | Tomiura Parking Area | | 101.7 | | | Noboribetsu |
| 17 | Noboribetsu Muroran Interchange | National Route 36; Pref. Route 144 (Noboribetsu Muroran Inter Route) | 110.1 | | | Noboribetsu |
| PA | Moto-Wanishi Parking Area | | 118.2 | | Hakodate-bound only | Muroran |
| 16 | Muroran Interchange | Pref. Route 107 (Muroran Kanjō Route); Pref. Route 127 (Muroran Inter Route) | 119.7 | | | Muroran |
| SA | Usuzan Service Area | | 130.2 | | | Date |
| 15 | Date Interchange | Pref. Route 145 (Date Inter Route); Pref. Route 519 (Takinomachi Date Route) | 132.6 | | | Date |
| - | Higashiusu Emergency Exit | | | | Authorized vehicles only | Tōyako |
| - | Kitausu Emergency Exit | | | | Authorized vehicles only | Tōyako |
| 14 | Abuta Tōyako Interchange | National Route 230 | 146.2 | | | Tōyako |
| PA | Toyoura-Funkawan Parking Area | | 154.3 | | Highway Oasis | Toyoura |
| 13 | Toyoura Interchange | National Route 37 | 159.4 | | | Toyoura |
| 12 | Kuromatsunai Junction | Kuromatsunai Shindō west | 177.6 | | | Kuromatsunai |
| PA | Shizukari Parking Area | | 187.9 | | | Oshamanbe |
| 11 | Oshamanbe Interchange | National Route 5 | 193.2 | | | Oshamanbe |
| 10 | Kunnui Interchange | National Route 230 | 204.3 | | | Oshamanbe |
| <PA> | Kunnui Parking Area | | | | Planned | Oshamanbe |
| 9 | Yakumo Interchange | National Route 277 | 226.0 | | | Yakumo |
| PA | Yakumo Parking Area | | 234.4 | | Highway Oasis | Yakumo |
| 8 | Otoshibe Interchange | Pref. Route 1155 (Otoshibe Inter Route) | 242.0 | | | Yakumo |
| 7 | Mori Interchange | Pref. Route 1156 (Mori Inter Route) | 262.2 | | | Mori |
| <TB> | Ōnuma Kōen Toll Gate | | | | | Mori |
| 6 | Ōnuma Kōen Interchange | Pref. Route 149 (Ōnuma Kōen Inter Route); Pref. Route 843 (Shukunobe Hoyōkichi Route) | 271.9 | | | Mori |
| <5> | Nanae Interchange | National Route 5 | | | Planned | Nanae |
Through to Hakodate Shindō

=== Northern route (Sapporo JCT - Nayoro IC) ===
| No. | Name | Connections | Dist. from Sapporo Junction | Bus stop | Notes | Location |
|---|---|---|---|---|---|---|
| 32 | Sapporo Junction | Sasson Expressway; Southern Route | 0.0 | | | Shiroishi-ku, Sapporo |
| 33 | Sapporo Interchange | National Route 274 (Sapporo Shindō) | 0.5 | | Asahikawa-bound entrance, Tomakomai-bound exit only | Shiroishi-ku, Sapporo |
| 34 | Ebetsu-nishi Interchange | Pref. Route 110 (Ebetsu Inter Route) | 7.1 | | | Ebetsu |
| PA | Nopporo Parking Area | | 10.3 | O | | Ebetsu |
| 35 | Ebetsu-higashi Interchange | National Route 337 | 16.7 | | | Ebetsu |
| BS | Kurisawa Bus Stop | | 24.3 | O | | Iwamizawa |
| 36 | Iwamizawa Interchange | National Route 234 | 32.4 | | | Iwamizawa |
| SA | Iwamizawa Service Area/ Higashiyama Bus Stop | | 36.1 | O | | Iwamizawa |
| 37 | Mikasa Interchange | Pref. Route 116 (Iwamizawa Mikasa Route) | 42.3 | | | Mikasa |
| 38 | Bibai Interchange | Pref. Route 135 (Bibai Furano Route) | 53.6 | | | Bibai |
| PA | Chashinai Parking Area | | 59.0 | O | | Bibai |
| 39 | Naie Sunagawa Interchange | Pref. Route 114 (Akabira Naie Route) | 67.2 | | | Naie |
| BS | Sunagawa Yoshino Bus Stop | | 71.1 | O | | Sunagawa |
| 40 SA SIC | Sunagawa Service Area/ Sunagawa Ishiyama Bus Stop | | 76.1 | O | Highway Oasis | Sunagawa |
| 41 | Takikawa Interchange | National Route 38 | 81.2 | | | Takikawa |
| BS | Ebeotsu Bus Stop | | 86.6 | O | | Takikawa |
| 42 | Fukagawa Junction | Fukagawa-Rumoi Expressway | 94.0 | | | Fukagawa |
| 43 | Fukagawa Interchange | Pref. Route 79 (Fukagawa Toyosato Route) | 99.1 | | | Fukagawa |
| PA | Otoe Parking Area | | 104.9 | | | Fukagawa |
| BS | Osamunai Bus Stop | | 109.1 | O | | Fukagawa |
| 44 | Asahikawa Takasu Interchange | Pref. Route 146 (Asahikawa Takasu Inter Route); Pref. Route 1125 (Arashiyama Kōen Route) | 125.8 | | | Takasu |
| 45 | Asahikawa-kita Interchange | Pref. Route 1150 (Asahikawa-kita Inter Route) | 134.3 | | | Asahikawa |
| PA | Pippu-Taisetsu Parking Area | | 141.6 | | | Pippu |
| 46 | Pippu Junction | Asahikawa-Monbetsu Expressway | 145.0 | | | Pippu |
| 47 | Wassamu Interchange | National Route 40 | 155.6 | | | Wassamu |
| <PA> | Kenbuchi Parking Area | | | | Opens in 2020 | Kenbuchi |
| TB | Kenbuchi Toll Gate | | 171.6 | | | Kenbuchi |
| 48 | Shibetsu-Kenbuchi Interchange | Pref. Route 1161 (Shibetsu-Kenbuchi Inter Route) | 171.6 | | | Kenbuchi |
| <49> | Tayoro Interchange | Pref. Route 888 (Tōyō Tayoro Route) | | | | Shibetsu |
| <50> | Nayoro Interchange | | | | | Nayoro |
Through to Nayoro-Bifuka Road
