= Japan National Route 241 =

Road in Hokkaido, Japan

National Route 241
- 国道241号

Route information
- Length: 162.5 km (101.0 mi)

Location
- Country: Japan

Highway system
- National highways of Japan; Expressways of Japan
← National Route 240	→ National Route 242

National Route 241 is a national highway of Japan connecting Teshikaga, Hokkaidō and Obihiro, Hokkaidō in Japan, with a total length of 162.5 km (100.97 mi).
