= Kanoko Dam =

Dam in Hokkaidō Prefecture, Japan

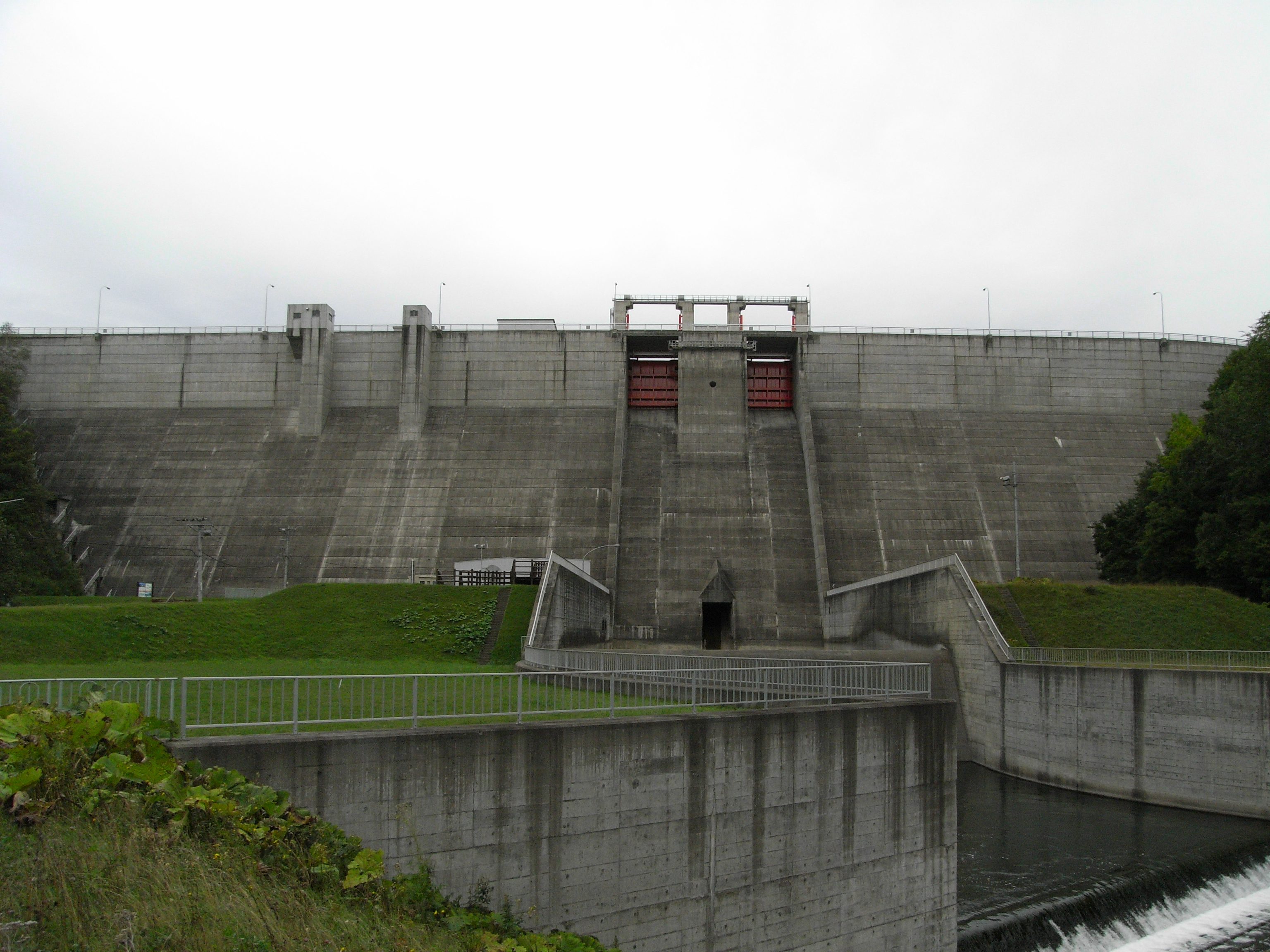
- Interactive map of Kanoko Dam
- Location: Hokkaidō, Japan.
- Coordinates: 43°36′26″N 143°23′16″E
- Construction began: 1972
- Opening date: 1983

Dam and spillways
- Impounds: Tokoro River
- Height: 55.5 m
- Length: 222 m

Reservoir
- Total capacity: 39,800,000 m^{3}
- Catchment area: 204 km^{2}
- Surface area: 124 hectares

The Kanoko Dam (鹿ノ子ダム) is a concrete Gravity dam in Oketocho, Hokkaidō, Japan. The dam is situated upon the Tokoro River. The dam is a multipurpose dam with a flood control function, as well as to provide irrigation to Kitami City among other municipalities, for irrigation, and for river flow control.

The artificial lake created by the construction of the dam is known as Oketo Lake.

The region surrounding the dam is largely used for agriculture. The dam was needed for flood control as well as to support the growing local populations and increased use of agricultural technology.

== Dam Construction ==
In 1968 The Hokkaido Development Bureau as well as the Abashiri Construction Development Department were planning a comprehensive flood control and irrigation strategy. In 1972, the project was implemented. Work began on road reconstructions and maintenance work of the surrounding area, along with compensation negotiations with the affected populations. In 1979, the project entered into the main construction phase which was completed in 1983.
