= Japan National Route 40 =

National highway in Japan

National Route 40
- 国道40号

Route information
- Length: 243.0 km (151.0 mi)
- Existed: 4 December 1952–present

Major junctions
- North end: Prefecture Route 106 in Wakkanai
- South end: National Route 12 / National Route 39 / National Route 233 in Asahikawa

Location
- Country: Japan
- Major cities: Shibetsu; Nayoro; Teshio

Highway system
- National highways of Japan; Expressways of Japan
| ← National Route 39 | → National Route 41 |

National Route 40 (国道40号, Kokudō yonjū-gō) is a national highway connecting Asahikawa and Wakkanai in Hokkaidō, Japan.

== Route data ==
- Length: 243.0 km (151.0 mi)
- Origin: Asahikawa (originates at the terminus of 12 and the origin of 39)
- Terminus: Wakkanai (ends at Wakkanai Station)

== History ==
- 1952-12-04 - First Class National Highway 40 (from Asahikawa to Wakkanai)
- 1965-04-01 - General National Highway 40 (from Asahikawa to Wakkanai)

== Overlapping sections ==
- From Shibetsu (Odori East-6 intersection) to Nayoro (West-4 North-1 intersection): Route 239
- From Bifuka (Odori Kita-3 intersection) to Otoineppu: Route 275
- From Teshio to the terminus: Route 232
