= Japan National Route 243 =

National highway in Japan

National Route 243
- 国道243号
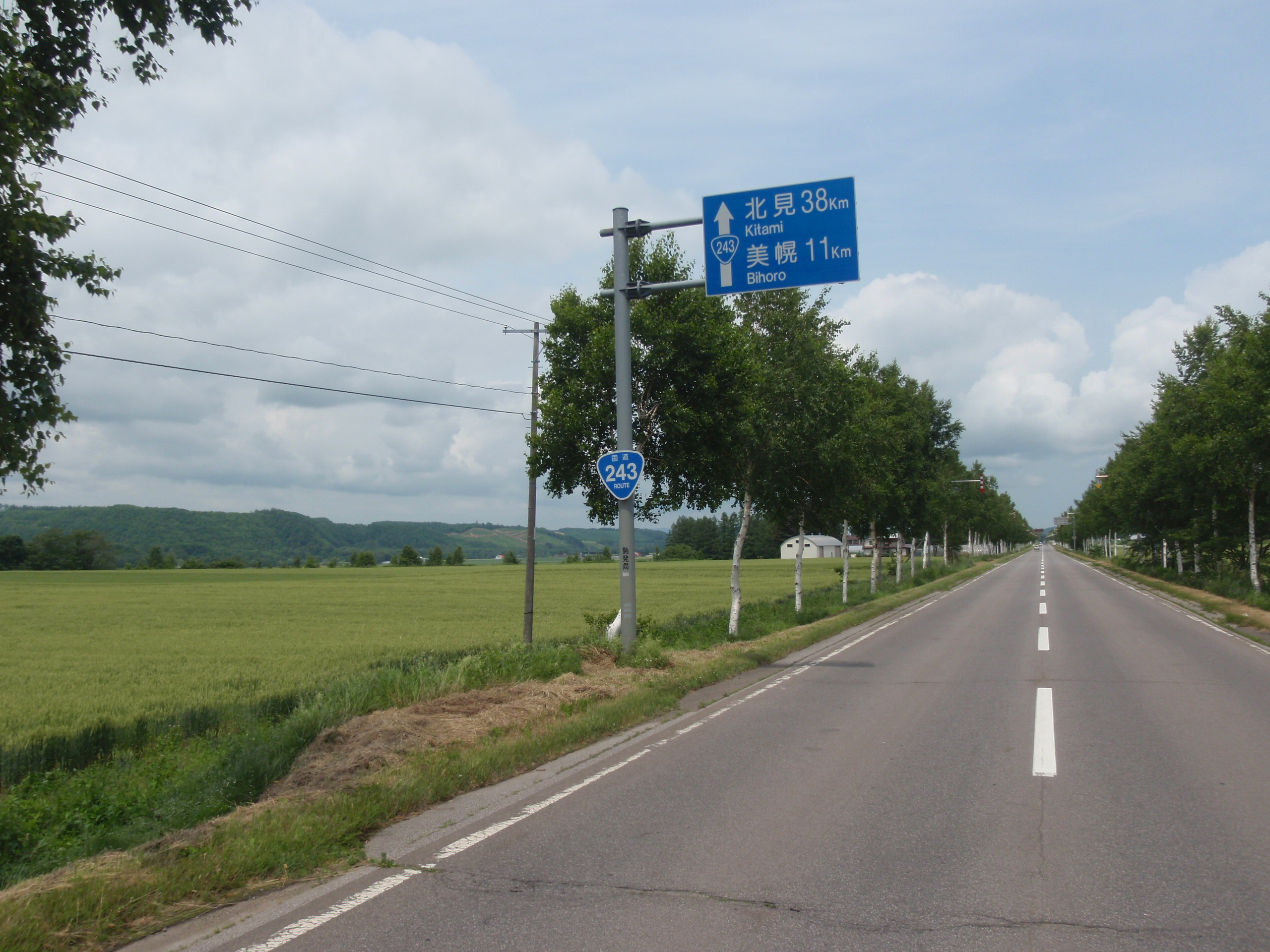

Route information
- Length: 173.1 km (107.6 mi)

Location
- Country: Japan

Highway system
- National highways of Japan; Expressways of Japan
← National Route 242	→ National Route 244

National Route 243 is a national highway of Japan connecting Abashiri, Hokkaidō and Nemuro, Hokkaidō in Japan, with a total length of 173.1 km (107.56 mi).
