= Japan National Route 239 =

Road in Hokkaido, Japan

National Route 239
- 国道239号

Route information
- Length: 346.6 km (215.4 mi)

Location
- Country: Japan

Highway system
- National highways of Japan; Expressways of Japan
| ← National Route 238 | → National Route 240 |

National Route 239 is a national highway of Japan connecting Abashiri, Hokkaidō and Rumoi, Hokkaidō in Japan, with a total length of 346.6 km (215.37 mi).
