= Japan National Route 240 =

Road in Hokkaido, Japan

National Route 240
- 国道240号
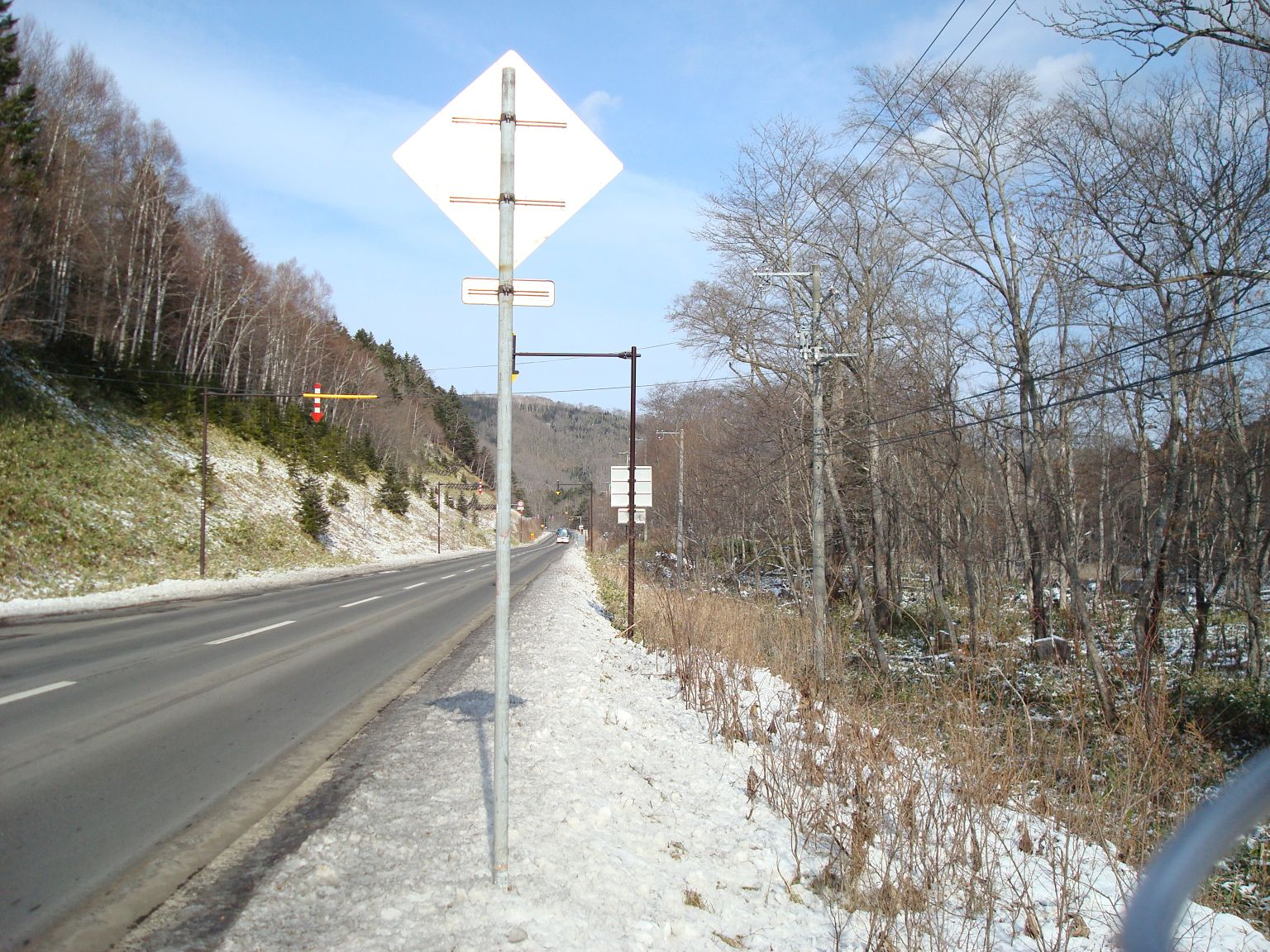

Route information
- Length: 149.0 km (92.6 mi)

Location
- Country: Japan

Highway system
- National highways of Japan; Expressways of Japan
← National Route 239	→ National Route 241

National Route 240 is a national highway of Japan connecting Kushiro, Hokkaidō, and Abashiri, Hokkaidō, in Japan, with a total length of 149 km (92.58 mi).
