= Japan National Route 333 =

Road in Hokkaido, Japan

National Route 333
- 国道333号
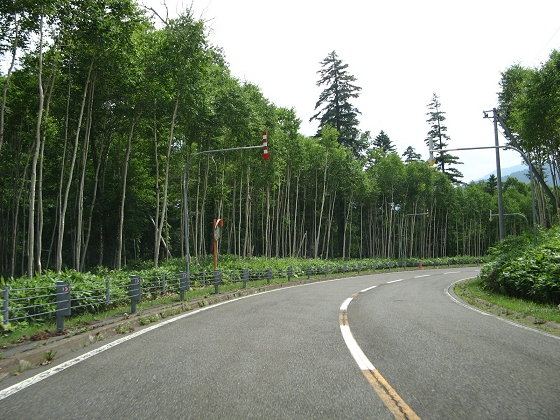

Route information
- Length: 169.9 km (105.6 mi)

Location
- Country: Japan

Highway system
- National highways of Japan; Expressways of Japan
← National Route 332	→ National Route 334

National Route 333 is a national highway of Japan connecting Asahikawa, Hokkaidō and Kitami, Hokkaidō in Japan, with a total length of 172.1 km (106.94 mi).
