= Tsubetsu =

Tsubetsu 津別町
- Town
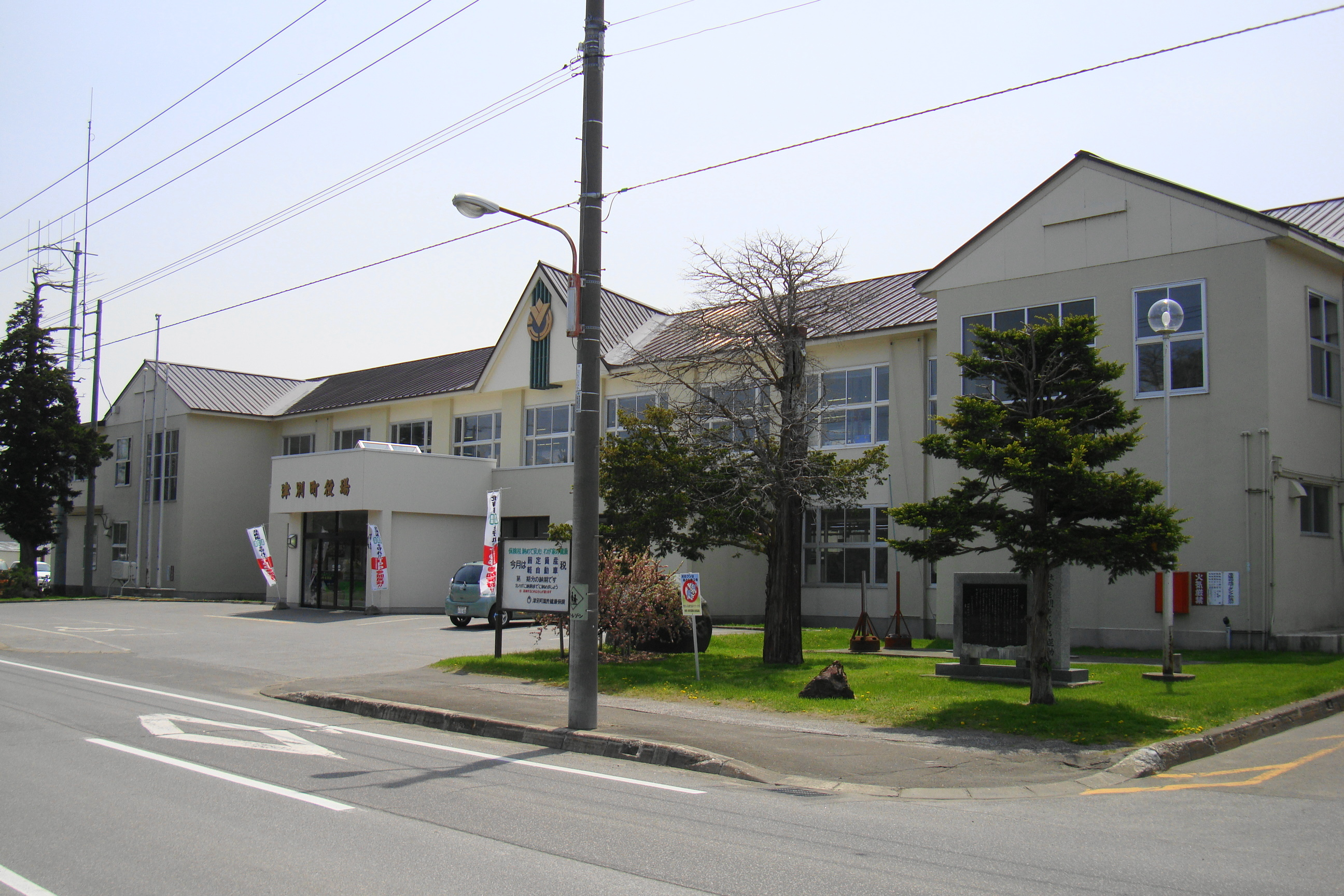
- Tsubetsu town

- Flag Seal

- Location of Tsubetsu in Hokkaido (Okhotsk Subprefecture)

- Location in Japan
- Coordinates: 43°42′N 144°2′E
- Country: Japan
- Region: Hokkaido
- Prefecture: Hokkaido (Okhotsk Subprefecture)
- District: Abashiri

Government
  - Mayor: Taichi Satō

Area
  - Total: 716.60 km^{2} (276.68 sq mi)

Population (September 30, 2016)
  - Total: 5,011
  - Density: 6.993/km^{2} (18.11/sq mi)
- Time zone: UTC+09:00 (JST)
- City hall address: 41 Aza Sachimachi, Tsubetsu-chō, Abashiri-gun, Hokkaidō; 092-0292
- Climate: Dfb
- Website: www.town.tsubetsu.hokkaido.jp
- Symbols
- Flower: Lily of the Valley
- Tree: Jezo Spruce

Tsubetsu (津別町, Tsubetsu-chō) is a town located in Okhotsk Subprefecture, Hokkaido, Japan.

As of September 2016, the town has an estimated population of 5,011 and a population density of 7 persons per km^{2}. The total area is 716.60 km^{2}.

== History ==
- 1919: Tsubetsu Village founded, split from Bihoro Village (now Town).
- 1921: Part of Bihoro Village incorporated.
- 1946: Tsubetsu Village becomes Tsubetsu Town.

== Climate ==
Climate data for Tsubetsu (1991−2020 normals, extremes 1988−present)
Month	Jan	Feb	Mar	Apr	May	Jun	Jul	Aug	Sep	Oct	Nov	Dec	Year
Record high °C (°F)	9.5 (49.1)	11.7 (53.1)	16.4 (61.5)	31.1 (88.0)	38.0 (100.4)	36.7 (98.1)	37.1 (98.8)	37.7 (99.9)	32.7 (90.9)	26.7 (80.1)	20.9 (69.6)	15.3 (59.5)	38.0 (100.4)
Mean daily maximum °C (°F)	−2.3 (27.9)	−1.5 (29.3)	3.2 (37.8)	10.8 (51.4)	17.5 (63.5)	21.2 (70.2)	24.6 (76.3)	25.4 (77.7)	21.7 (71.1)	15.6 (60.1)	7.8 (46.0)	0.5 (32.9)	12.0 (53.7)
Daily mean °C (°F)	−8.5 (16.7)	−7.9 (17.8)	−2.3 (27.9)	4.7 (40.5)	10.8 (51.4)	15.0 (59.0)	18.8 (65.8)	19.8 (67.6)	15.7 (60.3)	9.1 (48.4)	2.2 (36.0)	−5.4 (22.3)	6.0 (42.8)
Mean daily minimum °C (°F)	−15.3 (4.5)	−15.3 (4.5)	−8.6 (16.5)	−1.2 (29.8)	4.6 (40.3)	9.5 (49.1)	14.0 (57.2)	15.2 (59.4)	10.4 (50.7)	3.2 (37.8)	−3.1 (26.4)	−11.5 (11.3)	0.2 (32.3)
Record low °C (°F)	−28.0 (−18.4)	−28.7 (−19.7)	−21.6 (−6.9)	−14.4 (6.1)	−4.1 (24.6)	−0.7 (30.7)	4.1 (39.4)	5.9 (42.6)	0.6 (33.1)	−5.8 (21.6)	−17.0 (1.4)	−24.0 (−11.2)	−28.7 (−19.7)
Average precipitation mm (inches)	41.6 (1.64)	28.5 (1.12)	33.4 (1.31)	48.0 (1.89)	56.3 (2.22)	65.7 (2.59)	90.7 (3.57)	126.7 (4.99)	122.2 (4.81)	79.4 (3.13)	45.2 (1.78)	49.5 (1.95)	787.1 (30.99)
Average snowfall cm (inches)	126 (50)	108 (43)	99 (39)	22 (8.7)	2 (0.8)	0 (0)	0 (0)	0 (0)	0 (0)	0 (0)	15 (5.9)	107 (42)	480 (189)
Average rainy days	9.6	7.4	9.3	9.3	9.8	10.2	11.4	12.2	11.4	9.2	8.0	9.4	117.2
Average snowy days	12.5	11.5	11.1	2.2	0.2	0	0	0	0	0	1.8	10.2	49.5
Mean monthly sunshine hours	124.2	134.5	164.2	164.5	173.6	160.6	157.5	152.1	150.8	160.7	137.1	130.9	1,810.9
Source 1: JMA
Source 2: JMA

== Mascot ==
Maruta-kun, the town's mascot

Tsubetsu's mascot is Maruta-kun (まる太くん). He is an honest and energetic mizunara wood log bear kamuy who likes to play rugby. As such, he trains rugby players from all over the world.
