= Japan National Route 242 =

Road in Japan

National Route 242
- 国道242号
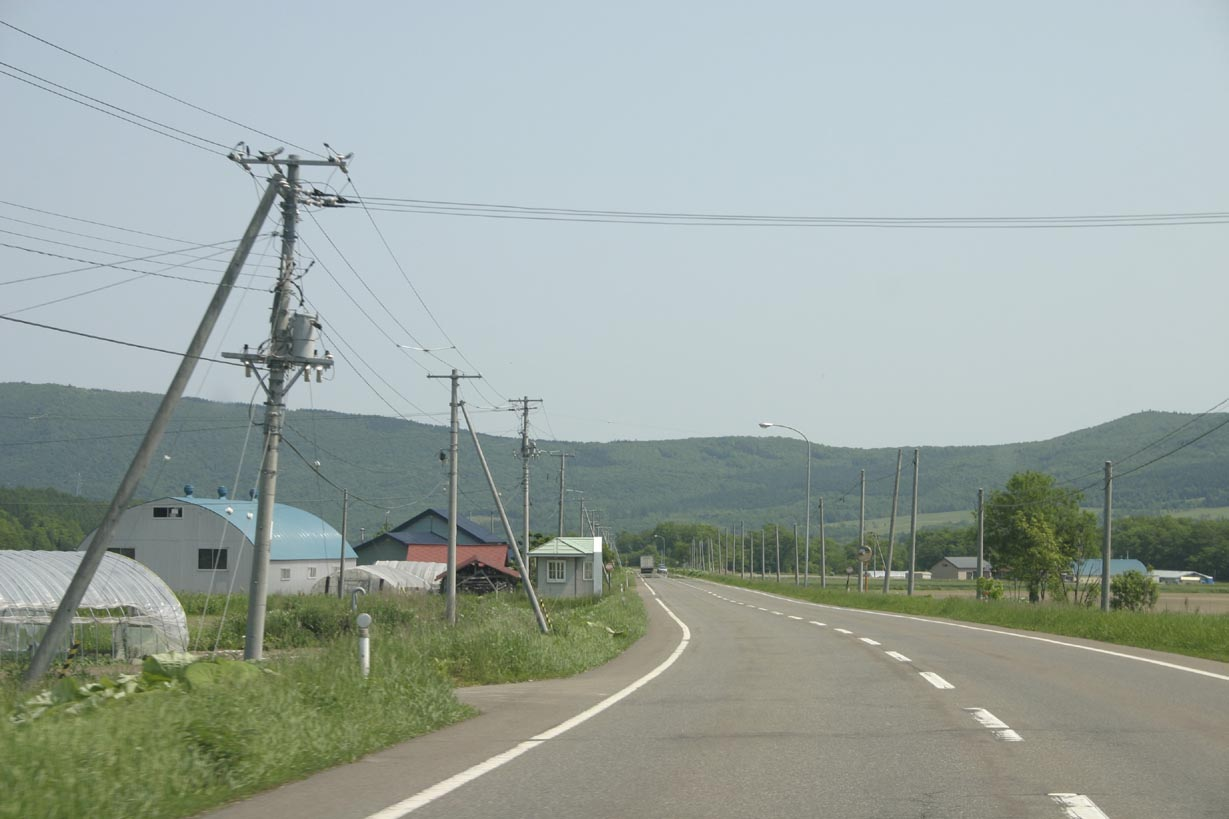

Route information
- Length: 284.9 km (177.0 mi)
- Existed: 1 April 1963–present

Location
- Country: Japan

Highway system
- National highways of Japan; Expressways of Japan
← National Route 241	→ National Route 243

National Route 242 is a national highway of Japan connecting Abashiri, Hokkaidō and Obihiro, Hokkaidō in Japan, with a total length of 284.9 km (177.03 mi).

== History ==
Route 242 was originally designated on 18 May 1953 from Kushiro to Nemuro. This was redesignated as Route 44 on 1 April 1963.
