= List of towns and villages in Hokkaido =

The following is a list of towns and villages in Hokkaido, Japan.

Name		Area (km^{2})	Population	Subprefecture	District	Type	Map
Rōmaji	Kanji	Area (km^{2})	Population	Subprefecture	District	Type	Map
Abira	安平町	237.13	8,323	Iburi Subprefecture	Yūfutsu District	Town	
Aibetsu	愛別町	250.13	2,992	Kamikawa Subprefecture	Kamikawa District	Town	
Akaigawa	赤井川村	280.11	1,157	Shiribeshi Subprefecture	Yoichi District	Village	
Akkeshi	厚岸町	734.82	9,048	Kushiro Subprefecture	Akkeshi District	Town	
Ashoro	足寄町	1,408.09	7,150	Tokachi Subprefecture	Ashoro District	Town	
Assabu	厚沢部町	460.58	3,884	Hiyama Subprefecture	Hiyama District	Town	
Atsuma	厚真町	404.56	4,659	Iburi Subprefecture	Yūfutsu District	Town	
Betsukai	別海町	1,320.15	15,179	Nemuro Subprefecture	Notsuke District	Town	
Biei	美瑛町	677.16	10,374	Kamikawa Subprefecture	Kamikawa District	Town	
Bifuka	美深町	672.14	4,609	Kamikawa Subprefecture	Nakagawa District	Town	
Bihoro	美幌町	438.36	20,920	Okhotsk Subprefecture	Abashiri District	Town	
Biratori	平取町	743.16	5,305	Hidaka Subprefecture	Saru District	Town	
Chippubetsu	秩父別町	47.26	2,463	Sorachi Subprefecture	Uryū District	Town	
Enbetsu	遠別町	590.86	2,966	Rumoi Subprefecture	Teshio District	Town	
Engaru	遠軽町	1,332.32	20,757	Okhotsk Subprefecture	Monbetsu District	Town	
Erimo	えりも町	283.93	4,954	Hidaka Subprefecture	Horoizumi District	Town	
Esashi	江差町	109.57	8,117	Hiyama Subprefecture	Hiyama District	Town	
Esashi	枝幸町	1,115.67	8,578	Sōya Subprefecture	Esashi District	Town	
Fukushima	福島町	187.23	4,390	Oshima Subprefecture	Matsumae District	Town	
Furubira	古平町	188.41	3,265	Shiribeshi Subprefecture	Furubira District	Town	
Haboro	羽幌町	472.49	7,338	Rumoi Subprefecture	Tomamae District	Town	
Hamanaka	浜中町	427.68	6,120	Kushiro Subprefecture	Akkeshi District	Town	
Hamatonbetsu	浜頓別町	401.56	3,841	Sōya Subprefecture	Esashi District	Town	
Hidaka	日高町	992.67	12,596	Hidaka Subprefecture	Saru District	Town	
Higashikagura	東神楽町	68.64	10,385	Kamikawa Subprefecture	Kamikawa District	Town	
Higashikawa	東川町	247.06	8,092	Kamikawa Subprefecture	Kamikawa District	Town	
Hiroo	広尾町	596.14	7,182	Tokachi Subprefecture	Hiroo District	Town	
Hokuryū	北竜町	158.82	1,965	Sorachi Subprefecture	Uryū District	Town	
Honbetsu	本別町	391.99	7,441	Tokachi Subprefecture	Nakagawa District	Town	
Horokanai	幌加内町	767.03	1,571	Kamikawa Subprefecture	Uryū District	Town	
Horonobe	幌延町	574.27	2,415	Sōya Subprefecture	Teshio District	Town	
Ikeda	池田町	371.91	6,933	Tokachi Subprefecture	Nakagawa District	Town	
Imakane	今金町	568.14	5,575	Hiyama Subprefecture	Setana District	Town	
Iwanai	岩内町	70.64	13,210	Shiribeshi Subprefecture	Iwanai District	Town	
Kamifurano	上富良野町	237.18	11,055	Kamikawa Subprefecture	Sorachi District	Town	
Kamikawa	上川町	1,049.24	3,706	Kamikawa Subprefecture	Kamikawa District	Town	
Kaminokuni	上ノ国町	547.58	5,161	Hiyama Subprefecture	Hiyama District	Town	
Kamishihoro	上士幌町	700.87	4,908	Tokachi Subprefecture	Katō District	Town	
Kamisunagawa	上砂川町	39.91	3,278	Sorachi Subprefecture	Sorachi District	Town	
Kamoenai	神恵内村	147.71	904	Shiribeshi Subprefecture	Furuu District	Village	
Kenbuchi	剣淵町	131.2	3,293	Kamikawa Subprefecture	Kamikawa District	Town	
Kikonai	木古内町	221.88	4,448	Oshima Subprefecture	Kamiiso District	Town	
Kimobetsu	喜茂別町	189.51	2,286	Shiribeshi Subprefecture	Abuta District	Town	
Kiyosato	清里町	402.73	4,222	Okhotsk Subprefecture	Shari District	Town	
Koshimizu	小清水町	287.04	5,029	Okhotsk Subprefecture	Shari District	Town	
Kunneppu	訓子府町	190.89	5,227	Okhotsk Subprefecture	Tokoro District	Town	
Kuriyama	栗山町	203.84	12,365	Sorachi Subprefecture	Yūbari District	Town	
Kuromatsunai	黒松内町	345.65	2,739	Shiribeshi Subprefecture	Suttsu District	Town	
Kushiro	釧路町	252.57	19,941	Kushiro Subprefecture	Kushiro District	Town	
Kutchan	倶知安町	261.24	15,573	Shiribeshi Subprefecture	Abuta District	Town	
Kyōgoku	京極町	231.61	3,144	Shiribeshi Subprefecture	Abuta District	Town	
Kyōwa	共和町	304.96	6,136	Shiribeshi Subprefecture	Iwanai District	Town	
Makkari	真狩村	114.43	2,081	Shiribeshi Subprefecture	Abuta District	Village	
Makubetsu	幕別町	340.46	26,610	Tokachi Subprefecture	Nakagawa District	Town	
Mashike	増毛町	369.64	4,634	Rumoi Subprefecture	Mashike District	Town	
Matsumae	松前町	293.11	7,843	Oshima Subprefecture	Matsumae District	Town	
Memuro	芽室町	513.91	18,806	Tokachi Subprefecture	Kasai District	Town	
Minamifurano	南富良野町	665.52	2,611	Kamikawa Subprefecture	Sorachi District	Town	
Mori	森町	378.27	16,299	Oshima Subprefecture	Kayabe District	Town	
Moseushi	妹背牛町	48.55	3,134	Sorachi Subprefecture	Uryū District	Town	
Mukawa	むかわ町	166.43	8,527	Iburi Subprefecture	Yūfutsu District	Town	
Naganuma	長沼町	168.36	11,262	Sorachi Subprefecture	Yūbari District	Town	
Naie	奈井江町	88.05	5,664	Sorachi Subprefecture	Sorachi District	Town	
Nakafurano	中富良野町	108.7	5,086	Kamikawa Subprefecture	Sorachi District	Town	
Nakagawa	中川町	594.87	1,585	Kamikawa Subprefecture	Nakagawa District	Town	
Nakasatsunai	中札内村	292.69	3,980	Tokachi Subprefecture	Kasai District	Village	
Nakashibetsu	中標津町	684.98	24,014	Nemuro Subprefecture	Shibetsu District	Town	
Nakatonbetsu	中頓別町	398.55	1,776	Sōya Subprefecture	Esashi District	Town	
Nanae	七飯町	216.61	28,514	Oshima Subprefecture	Kameda District	Town	
Nanporo	南幌町	81.49	7,816	Sorachi Subprefecture	Sorachi District	Town	
Niikappu	新冠町	585.88	5,696	Hidaka Subprefecture	Niikappu District	Town	
Niki	仁木町	167.93	3,874	Shiribeshi Subprefecture	Yoichi District	Town	
Niseko	ニセコ町	197.13	4,938	Shiribeshi Subprefecture	Abuta District	Town	
Nishiokoppe	西興部村	308.12	1,120	Okhotsk Subprefecture	Monbetsu District	Village	
Numata	沼田町	283.21	3,207	Sorachi Subprefecture	Uryū District	Town	
Obira	小平町	627.29	3,277	Rumoi Subprefecture	Rumoi District	Town	
Oketo	置戸町	527.54	3,042	Okhotsk Subprefecture	Tokoro District	Town	
Okoppe	興部町	362.41	3,963	Okhotsk Subprefecture	Monbetsu District	Town	
Okushiri	奥尻町	142.98	2,812	Hiyama Subprefecture	Okushiri District	Town	
Ōmu	雄武町	637.03	4,596	Okhotsk Subprefecture	Monbetsu District	Town	
Oshamambe	長万部町	310.75	5,694	Oshima Subprefecture	Yamakoshi District	Town	
Otobe	乙部町	162.55	3,925	Hiyama Subprefecture	Nishi District	Town	
Otoineppu	音威子府村	275.64	831	Kamikawa Subprefecture	Nakagawa District	Village	
Otofuke	音更町	466.09	44,235	Tokachi Subprefecture	Katō District	Town	
Ōzora	大空町	343.62	7,430	Okhotsk Subprefecture	Abashiri District	Town	
Pippu	比布町	87.29	3,845	Kamikawa Subprefecture	Kamikawa District	Town	
Rankoshi	蘭越町	449.68	4,893	Shiribeshi Subprefecture	Isoya District	Town	
Rausu	羅臼町	397.88	5,395	Nemuro Subprefecture	Menashi District	Town	
Rebun	礼文町	81.33	2,651	Sōya Subprefecture	Rebun District	Town	
Rikubetsu	陸別町	608.81	2,528	Tokachi Subprefecture	Ashoro District	Town	
Rishiri	利尻町	76.49	2,169	Sōya Subprefecture	Rishiri District	Town	
Rishirifuji	利尻富士町	105.69	2,665	Sōya Subprefecture	Rishiri District	Town	
Rubetsu	留別村	1,442.82	2,814	Nemuro Subprefecture	Etorofu District	Village	
Rusutsu	留寿都村	119.92	1,940	Shiribeshi Subprefecture	Abuta District	Village	
Ruyobetsu	留夜別村	960.27	3,401	Nemuro Subprefecture	Kunashiri District	Village	
Samani	様似町	364.33	4,482	Hidaka Subprefecture	Samani District	Town	
Sarabetsu	更別村	176.45	3,275	Tokachi Subprefecture	Kasai District	Village	
Saroma	佐呂間町	404.99	5,617	Okhotsk Subprefecture	Tokoro District	Town	
Sarufutsu	猿払村	590	2,884	Sōya Subprefecture	Sōya District	Village	
Setana	せたな町	638.67	8,501	Hiyama Subprefecture	Kudō District	Town	
Shakotan	積丹町	238.2	2,215	Shiribeshi Subprefecture	Shakotan District	Town	
Shana	紗那村	973.3	1,426	Nemuro Subprefecture	Shana District	Village	
Shari	斜里町	736.97	11,897	Okhotsk Subprefecture	Shari District	Town	
Shibecha	標茶町	1,099.41	7,862	Kushiro Subprefecture	Kawakami District	Town	
Shibetoro	蘂取村	760.5	881	Nemuro Subprefecture	Shibetoro District	Village	
Shibetsu	標津町	624.49	5,374	Nemuro Subprefecture	Shibetsu District	Town	
Shihoro	士幌町	259.13	6,234	Tokachi Subprefecture	Katō District	Town	
Shikabe	鹿部町	110.61	3,920	Oshima Subprefecture	Kayabe District	Town	
Shikaoi	鹿追町	399.69	5,570	Tokachi Subprefecture	Katō District	Town	
Shikotan	色丹村	253.33	1,499	Nemuro Subprefecture	Shikotan District	Village	
Shimamaki	島牧村	437.26	1,560	Shiribeshi Subprefecture	Shimamaki District	Village	
Shimizu	清水町	402.18	9,784	Tokachi Subprefecture	Kamikawa District	Town	
Shimokawa	下川町	644.2	3,836	Kamikawa Subprefecture	Kamikawa District	Town	
Shimukappu	占冠村	571.31	1,251	Kamikawa Subprefecture	Yūfutsu District	Village	
Shinhidaka	新ひだか町	1,147.75	23,516	Hidaka Subprefecture	Hidaka District	Town	
Shinshinotsu	新篠津村	78.24	3,235	Ishikari Subprefecture	Ishikari District	Village	
Shintoku	新得町	1,063.79	6,285	Tokachi Subprefecture	Kamikawa District	Town	
Shintotsukawa	新十津川町	495.62	6,787	Sorachi Subprefecture	Kabato District	Town	
Shiranuka	白糠町	773.74	7,972	Kushiro Subprefecture	Shiranuka District	Town	
Shiraoi	白老町	425.75	17,759	Iburi Subprefecture	Shiraoi District	Town	
Shiriuchi	知内町	196.67	4,620	Oshima Subprefecture	Kamiiso District	Town	
Shosanbetsu	初山別村	280.04	1,249	Rumoi Subprefecture	Tomamae District	Village	
Sōbetsu	壮瞥町	205.04	2,665	Iburi Subprefecture	Usu District	Town	
Suttsu	寿都町	95.36	3,113	Shiribeshi Subprefecture	Suttsu District	Town	
Taiki	大樹町	816.38	5,742	Tokachi Subprefecture	Hiroo District	Town	
Takasu	鷹栖町	139.44	6,780	Kamikawa Subprefecture	Kamikawa District	Town	
Takinoue	滝上町	786.89	2,757	Okhotsk Subprefecture	Monbetsu District	Town	
Teshikaga	弟子屈町	774.53	7,631	Kushiro Subprefecture	Kawakami District	Town	
Teshio	天塩町	353.31	3,241	Rumoi Subprefecture	Teshio District	Town	
Tōbetsu	当別町	422.71	16,694	Ishikari Subprefecture	Ishikari District	Town	
Tōma	当麻町	204.95	6,662	Kamikawa Subprefecture	Kamikawa District	Town	
Tomamae	苫前町	454.5	3,261	Rumoi Subprefecture	Tomamae District	Town	
Tomari	泊村	82.35	1,750	Shiribeshi Subprefecture	Furuu District	Village	
Tomari	泊村	538.56	5,595	Nemuro Subprefecture	Kunashiri District	Village	
Tōyako	洞爺湖町	180.54	9,231	Iburi Subprefecture	Abuta District	Town	
Toyokoro	豊頃町	536.52	3,262	Tokachi Subprefecture	Nakagawa District	Town	
Toyotomi	豊富町	520.69	4,054	Sōya Subprefecture	Teshio District	Town	
Toyoura	豊浦町	233.54	4,205	Iburi Subprefecture	Abuta District	Town	
Tsubetsu	津別町	716.6	5,011	Okhotsk Subprefecture	Abashiri District	Town	
Tsukigata	月形町	151.05	3,429	Sorachi Subprefecture	Kabato District	Town	
Tsurui	鶴居村	571.84	2,516	Kushiro Subprefecture	Akan District	Village	
Urahoro	浦幌町	729.64	5,023	Tokachi Subprefecture	Tokachi District	Town	
Urakawa	浦河町	694.24	12,800	Hidaka Subprefecture	Urakawa District	Town	
Urausu	浦臼町	101.08	1,983	Sorachi Subprefecture	Kabato District	Town	
Uryū	雨竜町	190.91	2,546	Sorachi Subprefecture	Uryū District	Town	
Wassamu	和寒町	224.83	3,553	Kamikawa Subprefecture	Kamikawa District	Town	
Yakumo	八雲町	955.98	17,299	Oshima Subprefecture	Futami District	Town	
Yoichi	余市町	140.6	19,698	Shiribeshi Subprefecture	Yoichi District	Town	
Yūbetsu	湧別町	505.74	8,474	Okhotsk Subprefecture	Monbetsu District	Town	
Yuni	由仁町	133.86	5,426	Sorachi Subprefecture	Yūbari District	Town	
