= List of municipalities of Hokkaido =

This is the list of municipalities in Hokkaido, Japan, sorted by subprefecture:

== Okhotsk (formerly Abashiri) Subprefecture ==
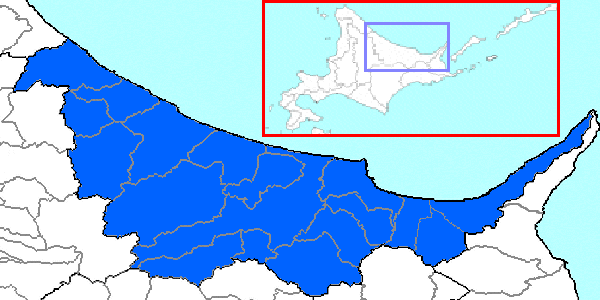
Abashiri Subprefecture

=== Cities ===
- Abashiri (capital)
- Kitami
  - Kitami (former)
  - Tanno (from Tokoro District)
  - Rubeshibe (from Tokoro District)
  - Tokoro (from Tokoro District)
- Monbetsu

=== Towns and villages by district ===
- Abashiri District
  - Bihoro
  - Ōzora
    - Memanbetsu (from Abashiri District)
    - Higashimokoto (from Abashiri District)
  - Tsubetsu
- Monbetsu District
  - Engaru
    - Engaru (former; from Monbetsu District)
    - Ikutahara (from Monbetsu District)
    - Maruseppu (from Monbetsu District)
    - Shirataki (from Monbetsu District)
  - Nishiokoppe
  - Okoppe
  - Ōmu
  - Takinoue
  - Yūbetsu
- Shari District
  - Kiyosato
  - Koshimizu
  - Shari
- Tokoro District
  - Kunneppu
  - Oketo
  - Saroma

== Hidaka Subprefecture ==
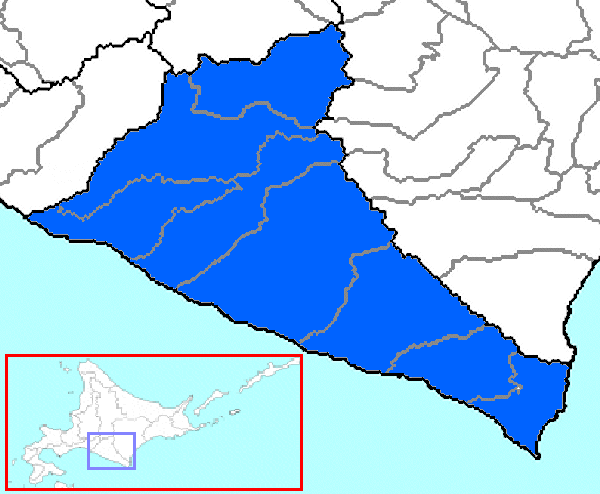
Hidaka Subprefecture

=== Cities ===
There are no cities in this subprefecture.

=== Towns and villages by district ===
- Hidaka District
  - Shinhidaka
    - Mitsuishi (from Mitsuishi District)
    - Shizunai (from Shizunai District)
- Horoizumi District
  - Erimo
- Niikappu District
  - Niikappu
- Samani District
  - Samani
- Saru District
  - Biratori
  - Hidaka
    - Hidaka (former; from Saru District)
    - Monbetsu (from Saru District)
- Urakawa District
  - Urakawa

== Hiyama Subprefecture ==
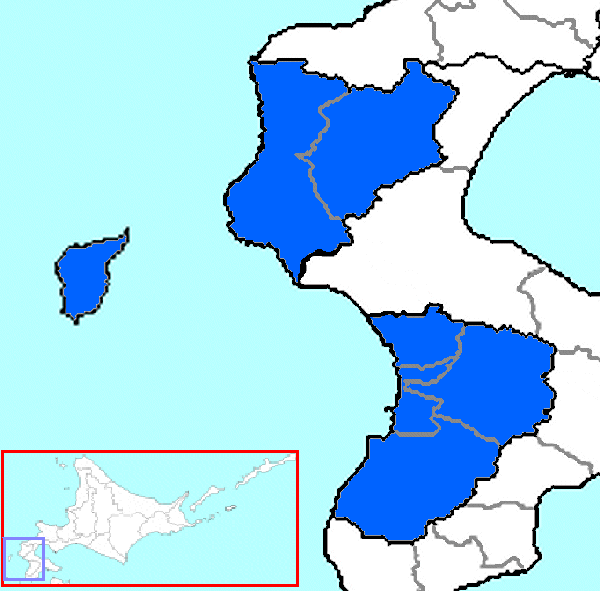
Hiyama Subprefecture

=== Cities ===
There are no cities in this subprefecture.

=== Towns and villages by district ===
- Hiyama District
  - Assabu
  - Esashi (capital)
  - Kaminokuni
- Kudō District
  - Setana
    - Setana (from Setana District)
    - Kitahiyama (from Setana District)
    - Taisei (from Kudō District)
- Nishi District
  - Otobe
- Okushiri District
  - Okushiri
- Setana District
  - Imakane

== Iburi Subprefecture ==
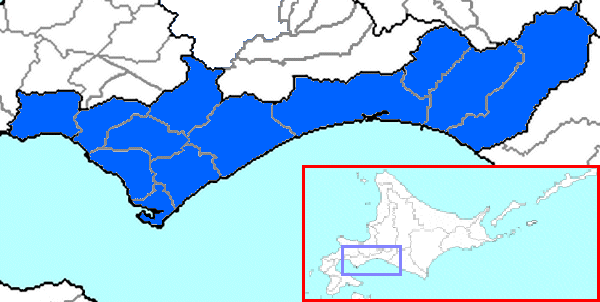
Iburi Subprefecture

=== Cities ===
- Date
  - Date (former)
  - Ōtaki (from Usu District)
- Muroran (capital)
- Noboribetsu
- Tomakomai

=== Towns and villages by district ===
- Abuta (Iburi) District
  - Tōyako
    - Abuta (from Abuta District)
    - Tōya (from Abuta District)
  - Toyoura
- Shiraoi District
  - Shiraoi
- Usu District
  - Sōbetsu
- Yūfutsu (Iburi) District
  - Abira
    - Hayakita (from Yūfutsu District)
    - Oiwake (from Yūfutsu District)
  - Atsuma
  - Mukawa
    - Mukawa (former; from Yūfutsu District)
    - Hobetsu (from Yūfutsu District)

== Ishikari Subprefecture ==
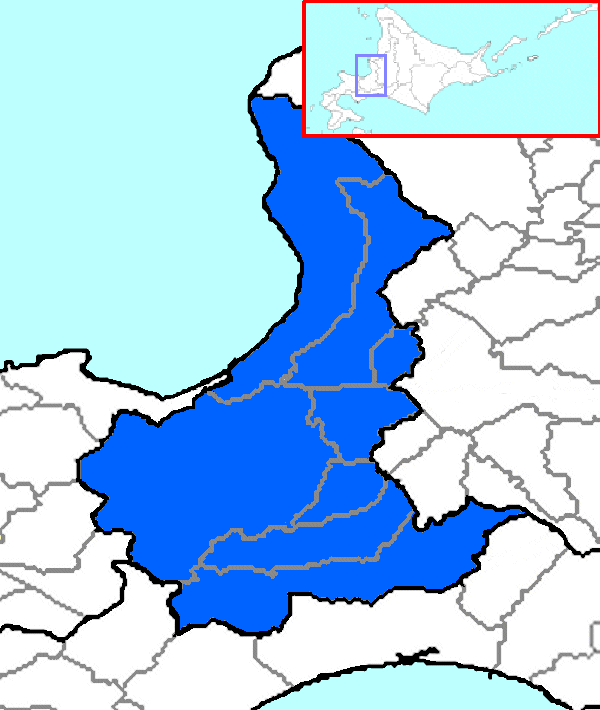
Ishikari Subprefecture

=== Cities ===
- Chitose
- Ebetsu
- Eniwa
- Ishikari
  - Ishikari
  - Atsuta (from Atsuta District)
  - Hamamasu (from Hamamasu District)
- Kitahiroshima
- Sapporo (capital of the prefecture and the subprefecture)

=== Towns and villages by district ===
- Ishikari District
  - Shinshinotsu
  - Tōbetsu

== Kamikawa Subprefecture ==
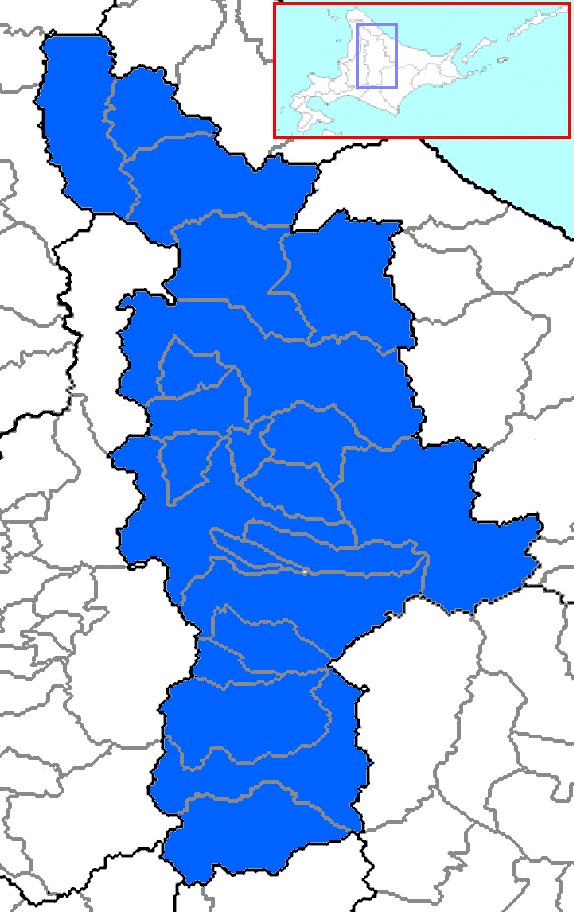
Kamikawa Subprefecture

=== Cities ===
- Asahikawa (capital)
- Furano
- Nayoro
  - Nayoro
  - Fūren (from Kamikawa (Teshio) District)
- Shibetsu
  - Shibetsu
  - Asahi (from Kamikawa (Teshio) District)

=== Towns and villages by district ===
- Kamikawa (Ishikari) District
  - Aibetsu
  - Biei
  - Higashikagura
  - Higashikawa
  - Kamikawa
  - Pippu
  - Takasu
  - Tōma
- Kamikawa (Teshio) District
  - Kenbuchi
  - Shimokawa
  - Wassamu
- Nakagawa (Teshio) District
  - Bifuka
  - Nakagawa
  - Otoineppu
- Sorachi (Kamikawa) District
  - Kamifurano
  - Minamifurano
  - Nakafurano
- Yūfutsu (Kamikawa) District
  - Shimukappu
- Uryū District
  - Horokanai

== Kushiro Subprefecture ==
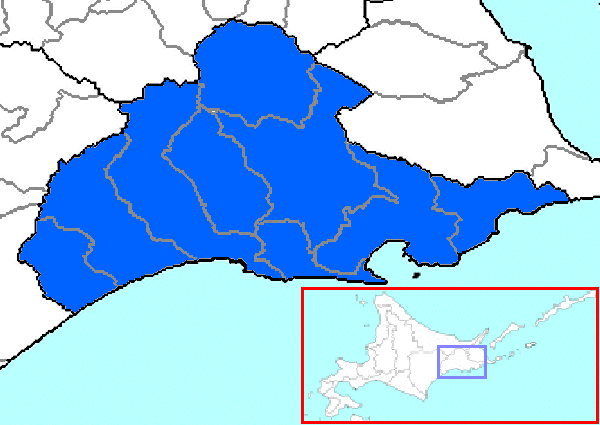
Kushiro Subprefecture

=== Cities ===
- Kushiro (capital)
  - Akan (from Akan District)
  - Onbetsu (from Shiranuka District)

=== Towns and villages by district ===
- Akan District
  - Tsurui
- Akkeshi District
  - Akkeshi
  - Hamanaka
- Kawakami District
  - Shibecha
  - Teshikaga
- Kushiro District
  - Kushiro
- Shiranuka District
  - Shiranuka

== Nemuro Subprefecture ==
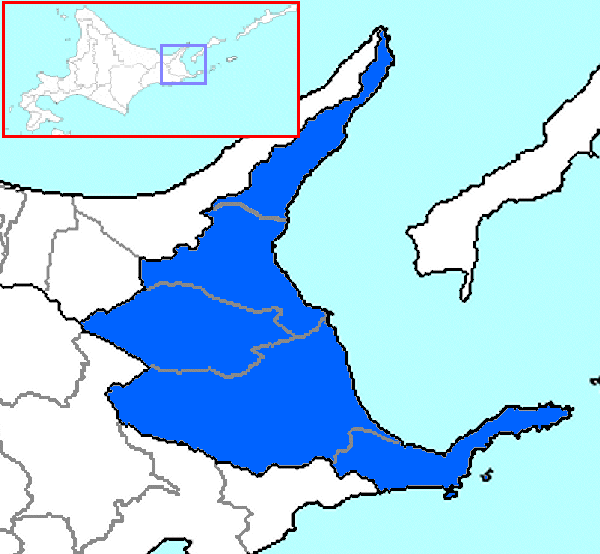
Nemuro Subprefecture

=== Cities ===
- Nemuro (capital)

=== Towns and villages by district ===
- Menashi District
  - Rausu
- Notsuke District
  - Betsukai
- Shibetsu District
  - Nakashibetsu
  - Shibetsu

== Oshima Subprefecture ==
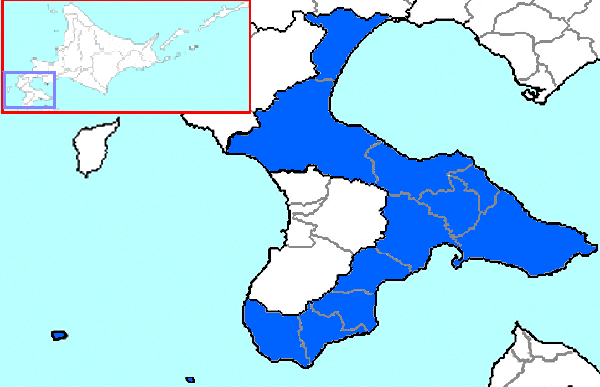
Oshima Subprefecture

=== Cities ===
- Hakodate (capital)
  - Hakodate (former)
  - Minamikayabe (from Kayabe District)
  - Esan (from Kameda District)
  - Toi (from Kameda District)
  - Todohokke (from Kameda District)
- Hokuto
  - Kamiiso (from Kamiiso District)
  - Ōno (from Kameda District)

=== Towns and villages by district ===
- Futami District
  - Yakumo
    - Yakumo (from Yamakoshi District)
    - Kumaishi (from Nishi District, Hiyama)
- Kameda District
  - Nanae
- Kamiiso District
  - Kikonai
  - Shiriuchi
- Kayabe District
  - Mori
    - Mori (former; from Kayabe District)
    - Sawara (from Kayabe District)
  - Shikabe
- Matsumae District
  - Fukushima
  - Matsumae
- Yamakoshi District
  - Oshamanbe

== Rumoi Subprefecture ==
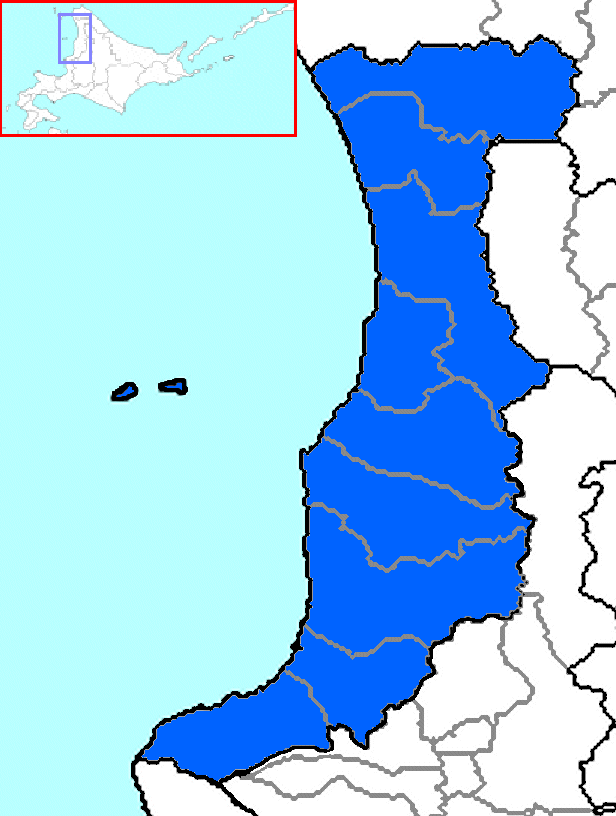
Rumoi Subprefecture

=== Cities ===
- Rumoi (capital)

=== Towns and villages by district ===
- Mashike District
  - Mashike
- Rumoi District
  - Obira
- Teshio (Rumoi) District
  - Enbetsu
  - Horonobe
  - Teshio
- Tomamae District
  - Haboro
  - Shosanbetsu
  - Tomamae

== Shiribeshi Subprefecture ==
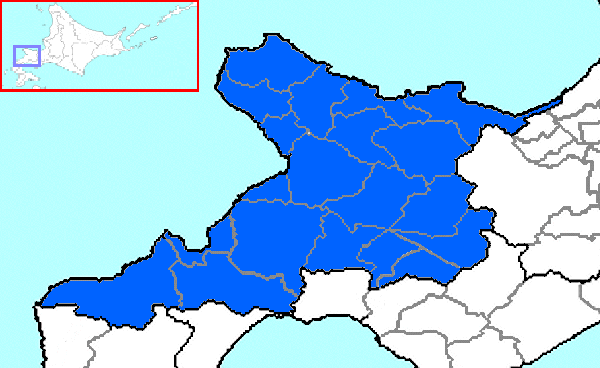
Shiribeshi Subprefecture

=== Cities ===
- Otaru

=== Towns and villages by district ===
- Abuta (Shiribeshi) District
  - Kimobetsu
  - Kutchan (capital)
  - Kyōgoku
  - Makkari
  - Niseko
  - Rusutsu
- Furubira District
  - Furubira
- Furuu District
  - Kamoenai
  - Tomari
- Iwanai District
  - Iwanai
  - Kyōwa
- Isoya District
  - Rankoshi
- Shakotan District
  - Shakotan
- Shimamaki District
  - Shimamaki
- Suttsu District
  - Kuromatsunai
  - Suttsu
- Yoichi District
  - Akaigawa
  - Niki
  - Yoichi

== Sorachi Subprefecture ==
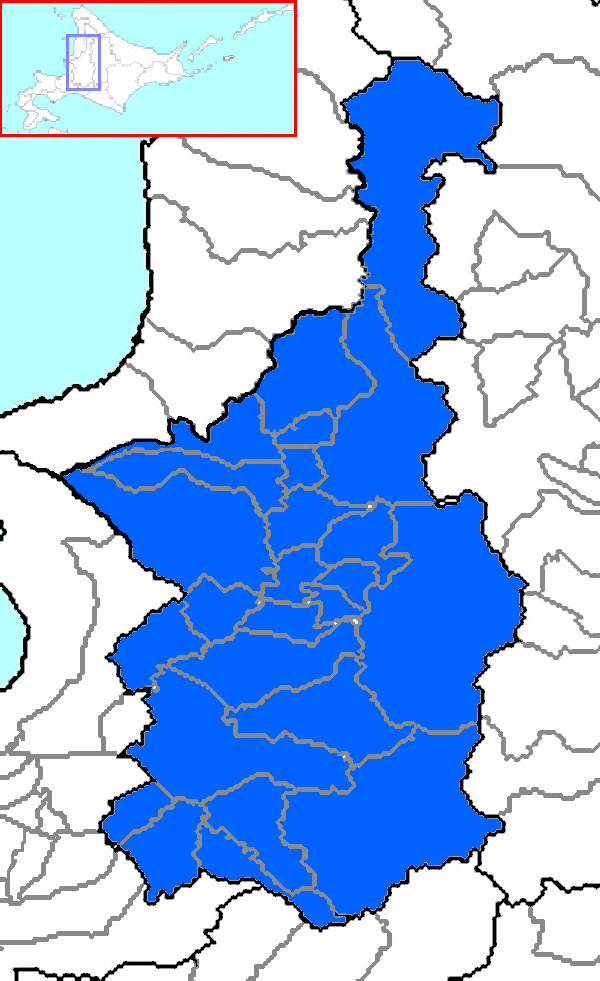
Sorachi Subprefecture

=== Cities ===
- Akabira
- Ashibetsu
- Bibai
- Fukagawa
- Iwamizawa (capital)
  - Iwamizawa (former)
  - Kurisawa (from Sorachi District)
  - Kita (from Sorachi District)
- Mikasa
- Sunagawa
- Takikawa
- Utashinai
- Yūbari

=== Towns and villages by district ===
- Kabato District
  - Shintotsukawa
  - Tsukigata
  - Urausu
- Sorachi District
  - Kamisunagawa
  - Naie
  - Nanporo
- Uryū District
  - Chippubetsu
  - Hokuryū
  - Moseushi
  - Numata
  - Uryū
- Yūbari District
  - Kuriyama
  - Naganuma
  - Yuni

== Sōya Subprefecture ==
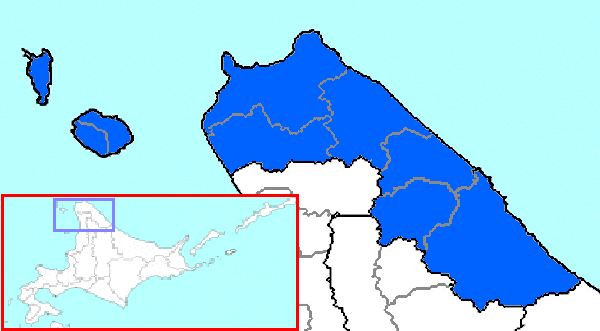
Sōya Subprefecture

=== Cities ===
- Wakkanai (capital)

=== Towns and villages by district ===
- Esashi District
  - Esashi
    - Esashi (former; from Esashi District)
    - Utanobori (from Esashi District)
  - Hamatonbetsu
  - Nakatonbetsu
- Rebun District
  - Rebun
- Rishiri District
  - Rishiri
  - Rishirifuji
- Sōya District
  - Sarufutsu
- Teshio (Sōya) District
  - Toyotomi

== Tokachi Subprefecture ==
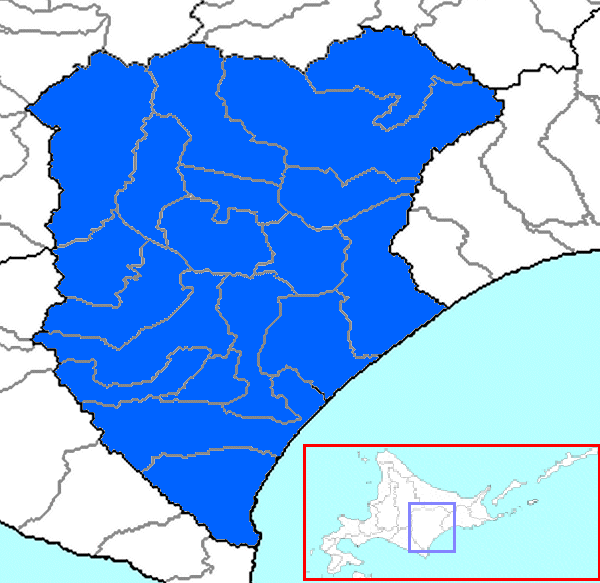
Tokachi Subprefecture

=== Cities ===
- Obihiro (capital)

=== Towns and villages by district ===
- Ashoro District
  - Ashoro
  - Rikubetsu
- Hiroo District
  - Hiroo
  - Taiki
- Kamikawa (Tokachi) District
  - Shimizu
  - Shintoku
- Kasai District
  - Memuro
  - Nakasatsunai
  - Sarabetsu
- Katō District
  - Kamishihoro
  - Otofuke
  - Shihoro
  - Shikaoi
- Nakagawa (Tokachi) District
  - Honbetsu
  - Ikeda
  - Makubetsu
    - Makubetsu (former; from Nakagawa (Tokachi) District)
    - Chūrui (from Hiroo District)
  - Toyokoro
- Tokachi District
  - Urahoro
