= Hokkaidō Prefectural Board of Education =

Board of education

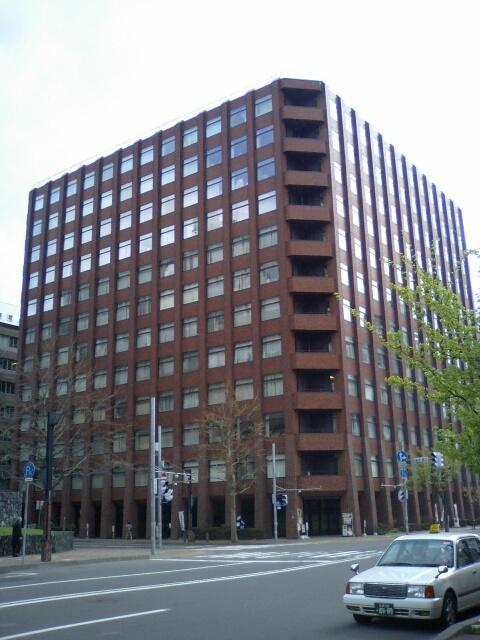
Office building of Hokkaido Prefectural Board of Education

The Hokkaido Prefectural Board of Education (北海道教育委員会, Hokkaidō kyōiku iinkai) is a board of education that mainly oversees public schools in Hokkaido, Japan.

The board directly oversees high schools and provides educational services in Hokkaido.

== High schools ==
=== Okhotsk Subprefecture ===
==== Abashiri ====
- Abashiri Minami Gaoka High School
- Abashiri Keiyo High School
- Abashiri Special High School

==== Abashiri District ====
- Bihoro High School (Bihoro)
- Memanbetsu High School (Ōzora)
- Tsubetsu High School (Tsubetsu)

==== Kitami ====
- Kitami Hokuto High School
- Kitami Hakuyou High School
- Kitami Ryokuryou High School
- Kitami Commercial High School
- Kitami Technical High School
- Rubeshibe High School
- Tokoro High School

==== Monbetsu ====
- Monbetsu High School
- Monbetsu High School for the Physically Challenged
- Monbetsu School for the Physically Challenged
- Monbetsu Himawari Special School

==== Monbetsu District ====
- Ohmu High School (Ōmu)
- Engaru High School (Engaru)
- Okoppe High School (Okoppe)
- Takinoue High School (Takinoue)
- Yubetsu High School (Kamiyubetsu)

==== Shari District ====
- Kiyosato High School (Kiyosato)
- Koshimizu High School (Koshimizu)
- Shari High School (Shari)

==== Tokoro District ====
- Kunneppu High School (Kunneppu)
- Oketo High School (Oketo)
- Saroma High School (Saroma)

=== Hidaka Subprefecture ===
==== Hidaka District ====
- Shizunai High School (Shinhidaka)
- Shizunai Agricultural High School (Shinhidaka)
- Shizunai Garden Branch Special School (Shinhidaka)

==== Saru District ====
- Tomikawa High School (Hidaka)
- Biratori High School (Biratori)
- Biratori Special School (Biratori)

==== Urakawa District ====
- Urakawa High School (Urakawa)

=== Hiyama Subprefecture ===
==== Hiyama District ====
- Esashi High School (Esashi)
- Kaminokuni High School (Kaminokuni)

==== Kudō District ====
- Hiyamakita High School (Setana)

==== Okushiri District ====
- Okushiri High School (Okushiri)

==== Setana District ====
- Imakane High School (Imakane)

=== Iburi Subprefecture ===
==== Abuta District ====
- Abuta High School (Toyako)

==== Date ====
- Date High School
- Date Midorigaoka High School
- Date Special High School

==== Muroran ====
- Muroran Sakae High School
- Muroran Shimizugaoka High School
- Muroran Technical High School
- Muroran Tosho High School
- Muroran Special High School
- High School of the Deaf in Muroran

==== Noboribetsu ====
- Noboribetsu Seiryo High School
- Noboribetsu Akebi Secondary School

==== Shiraoi District ====
- Shiraoi East High School (Shiraoi)

==== Tomakomai ====
- Tomakomai East High School
- Tomakomai South High School
- Tomakomai Sohgoh Keizai High School
- Tomakomai Technical High School
- Tomakomai West High School

==== Yūfutsu District ====
- Atsuma High School (Atsuma)
- Hobetsu High School (Mukawa)
- Mukawa High School (Mukawa)
- Oiwake High School (Abira)

=== Ishikari Subprefecture ===
==== Chitose ====
- Chitose High School
- Chitose Hokuyo High School

==== Ebetsu ====
- Ebetsu High School
- Nopporo High School
- Ooasa High School

==== Eniwa ====
- Eniwa North High School
- Eniwa South High School

==== Ishikari ====
- Ishikari South High School
- Ishikari Shoyo High School

==== Ishikari District ====
- Tobetsu High School (Tōbetsu)
- Shinshinotsu High School for Physically Handicapped and Mentally Retarded (Shinshinotsu)

==== Kitahiroshima ====
- Kitahiroshima High School
- Kitahiroshima West High School
- Shirakaba High School for Physically Handicapped and Mentally Retarded
- Sapporo Yougokyouei High School

==== Sapporo ====
===== Atsubetsu-ku =====
- Sapporo Atsubetsu High School
- Sapporo Higashi Commercial High School
- Sapporo Keisei High School

===== Chūō-ku =====
- Sapporo-Minami High School
- Sapporo Nishi High School
- Sapporo Needs School for the Visually impaired

===== Higashi-ku =====
- Sapporo Okadama High School
- Sapporo Toryo High School
- Sapporo Toho High School

===== Kita-ku =====
- Sapporo Hokuryou High School
- Sapporo Intercultural and Technological High School
- Sapporo Kita High School
- Sapporo Eiai High School
- Sapporo Technical High School
- Yuho High School
- Takuhoku Special High School
- Sapporo School for The Deaf

===== Kiyota-ku =====
- Sapporo Hiraoka High School
- Sapporo Shinei High School

===== Minami-ku =====
- Sapporo Nanryou High School
- Sapporo Makomanai School for the Physically Challenged
- Sapporo Yougomonami High School

===== Nishi-ku =====
- Sapporo Seiryo High School

===== Shiroishi-ku =====
- Sapporo Hakuryo High School
- Sapporo East High School
- Sapporo Shiroishi High School

===== Teine-ku =====
- Sapporo Asukaze High School
- Sapporo Teine High School
- Sapporo Touun High School
- Sapporo Special High School
- Hoshioki School for Special Needs
- Teine Special High School

===== Toyohira-ku =====
- Sapporo Tsukisamu High School

=== Kamikawa Subprefecture ===
==== Asahikawa ====
- Asahikawa Agricultural High School
- Asahikawa Commercial High School
- Asahikawa East High School
- Asahikawa North High School
- Asahikawa South High School
- Asahikawa West High School
- Asahikawa Ryoun High School
- Asahikawa Technical High School
- Asahikawa Toei High School
- Asahikawa Special School
- Asahikawa School for the Blind
- Asahikawa School For The Deaf

==== Furano ====
- Furano High School
- Furano Ryuohoku High School

==== Kamikawa (Ishikari) District ====
- Biei High School (Biei)
- Higashikawa High School (Higashikawa)
- Kamikawa High School (Kamikawa)
- Takasu High School (Takasu)
- Special Dream School Higashikawa (Higashikawa)
- Takasu Special School (Takasu)

==== Kamikawa (Teshio) District ====
- Shimokawa Commercial High School (Shimokawa)

==== Nakagawa (Teshio) District ====
- Hokkaido Bifuka High School (Bifuka)
- Bifuka Special High School (Bifuka)

==== Nayoro ====
- Nayoro High School
- Nayoro industry High School

==== Shibetsu ====
- Shibetsu Shoun High School

==== Sorachi District ====
- Kamifurano High School (Kamifurano)

=== Kushiro Subprefecture ===
==== Akkeshi District ====
- Akkeshi Shouyou High School (Akkeshi)

==== Kawakami District ====
- Shibecha High School (Shibecha)
- Teshikaga High School (Teshikaga)

==== Kushiro ====
- Kushiro Commercial High School
- Kushiro East High School
- Kushiro Konan High School
- Kushiro Koryo High School
- Kushiro Meiki High School
- Kushiro Technical High School
- Akan High School
- Kushiro Special High School

==== Shiranuka District ====
- Shiranuka High School (Shiranuka)
- Shiranuka High School for the Physically Challenged (Shiranuka)

=== Nemuro Subprefecture ===
==== Menashi District ====
- Rausu High School (Rausu)

==== Nemuro ====
- Nemuro High School
- Nemuro West High School

==== Notsuke District ====
- Betsukai High School (Betsukai)

==== Shibetsu District ====
- Nakashibetsu High School (Nakashibetsu)
- Shibetsu High School (Shibetsu)
- Nakashibetsu Koyo High School (Nakashibetsu)

=== Oshima Subprefecture ===
==== Futami District ====
- Kumaishi High School (Yakumo)
- Yakumo High School (Yakumo)
- Yakumo Special School (Yakumo) (School for the Challenged)

==== Hakodate ====
- Hakodate Commercial High School
- Hakodate Chubu High School
- Hakodate Technical High School
- Hakodate Nishi High School
- Hakodate Ryohoku High School
- Minamikayabe High School
- Toi High School
- Hakodate High School For the Blind
- Hakodate High School for the Deaf
- Goryoukakuyougo Special High School

==== Hokuto ====
- Kamiiso High School
- Ono Agricultural High School
- Hakodate Fishery High School
- Nanae Yougo Ohima High School

==== Kameda District ====
- Nanae High School (Nanae)
- Nanae High School for the Physically Challenged (Nanae)

==== Hayabe District ====
- Mori High School (Mori)

==== Matsumae District ====
- Fukushima Commercial High School (Fukushima)
- Matsumae High School (Matsumae)

==== Yamakoshi District ====
- Oshamambe High School (Oshamambe)

=== Rumoi Subprefecture ===
==== Rumoi ====
- Rumoi High School
- Rumoi Senbou High School

==== Rumoi District ====
- Obira Yougo High School (Obira)

==== Teshio District ====
- Enbetsu Agricultural High School (Enbetsu)
- Teshio High School (Teshio)

==== Tomamae District ====
- Haboro High School (Haboro)
- Tomamae Commercial High School (Tomamae)

=== Shiribeshi Subprefecture ===
==== Abuta District ====
- Kutchan High School (Kutchan)
- Kutchan Agricultural High School (Kutchan)

==== Isoya District ====
- Rankoshi High School (Rankoshi)

==== Iwanai District ====
- Iwanai High School (Iwanai)
- Kyowa High School (Kyowa)

==== Otaru ====
- Otaru Commercial High School
- Otaru Chouryou High School
- Otaru Fishery High School
- Otaru Ouyou High School
- Otaru Technical High School
- Hokkaido High School for the Deaf

==== Suttsu District ====
- Suttsu High School

==== Yoichi District ====
- Yoichi Koushi High School (Yoichi)
- Yoichi Special High School (Yoichi)
- Yoichi Shiribeshi School for Physically and Mentally Handicapped (Yoichi)

=== Sorachi Subprefecture ===
==== Ashibetsu ====
- Ashibetsu High School

==== Bibai ====
- Bibai Shoei High School
- Bibai Seika High School
- Bibai Special High School

==== Fukagawa ====
- Fukagawa East High School
- Fukagawa West High School (Nishi)

==== Iwamizawa ====
- Iwamizawa East High School
- Iwamizawa West High School
- Iwamizawa Agricultural High School
- Iwamizawa Special High School

==== Kabato District ====
- Shintotsukawa Agricultural High School (Shintotsukawa)
- Tsukigata High School (Tsukigata)

==== Sorachi District ====
- Naie Commercial High School (Naie)
- Nanporo High School (Nanporo)
- Nanporo Special School (Nanporo)

==== Sunagawa ====
- Sunagawa High School

==== Takikawa ====
- Takikawa High School
- Takikawa Technical High School

==== Uryū District ====
- Uryuu Special High School (Uryū)

==== Yubari ====
- Yubari High School
- Yubari Special High School

==== Yūbari District ====
- Kuriyama High School (Kuriyama)
- Naganuma High School (Naganuma)

=== Sōya Subprefecture ===
==== Esashi District ====
- Esashi High School (Esashi)
- Hamatonbetsu High School (Hamatonbetsu)

==== Rebun District ====
- Rebun High School (Rebun)

==== Rishiri District ====
- Rishiri High School (Rishiri)

==== Teshio District ====
- Toyotomi High School (Toyotomi)

==== Wakkanai ====
- Wakkanai High School
- Wakkanai High School for the Physically Challenged

=== Tokachi Subprefecture ===
==== Ashoro District ====
- Ashoro High School (Ashoro)

==== Hiro District ====
- Hiroo High School (Hiro)
- Taiki High School (Taiki)

==== Kamikawa District ====
- Shimizu High School (Shimizu)
- Shintoku High School (Shintoku)

==== Kasai District ====
- Memuro High School (Memuro)
- Sarabetsu Agricultural High School (Sarabetsu)
- Nakasatsunai Special High School (Nakasatsunai)

==== Katō District ====
- Kamishihoro High School (Kamishihoro)
- Otofuke High School (Otofuke)
- Shikaoi High School (Shikaoi)

==== Nakagawa District ====
- Honbetsu High School (Honbetsu)
- Ikeda High School (Ikeda)
- Makubetsu High School (Makubetsu)

==== Obihiro ====
- Obihiro Agricultural High School
- Obihiro Hakuyou High School
- Obihiro Ryokuyou High School
- Obihiro Sanjyo High School
- Obihiro Technical High School
- Obihiro Special High School
- School for the Blind at Obihiro
- Obihiro School for the Deaf

== Service to support life-long learning ==
- Citizen's College of Hokkaido(道民カレッジ) - An adult education service provided by Hokkaido Prefectural Board of Education
