= Hokkaido Esashi High School =

Educational institution in Japan

Coordinates: 41.9132°N 140.1479°E

Hokkaido Esashi High School (北海道江差高等学校, Hokkaidō Esashi Kōtōgakkō) is a senior high school in Esashi, Hiyama Subprefecture, Hokkaido, Japan.

Bus lines connect the school to Hakodate Station and Yakumo Station. It was previously accessible from the Esashi Station.
