= Uryū, Hokkaido =

Uryū 雨竜町
- Town
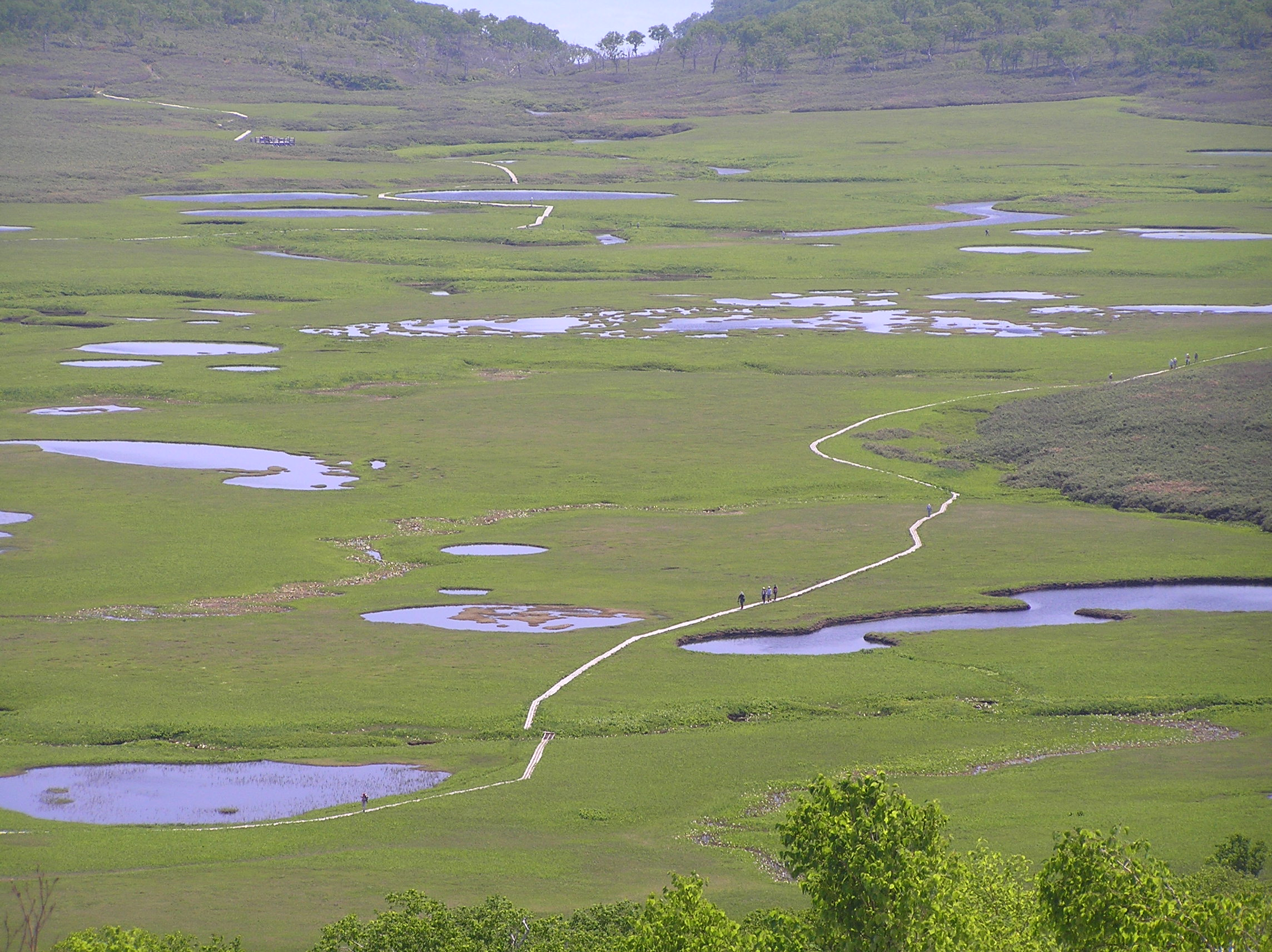
- Uryunuma Wetland

- Flag Seal

- Location of Uryū in Hokkaido (Sorachi Subprefecture)

- Location in Japan
- Coordinates: 43°39′N 141°53′E
- Country: Japan
- Region: Hokkaido
- Prefecture: Hokkaido (Sorachi Subprefecture)
- District: Uryū

Area
  - Total: 190.91 km^{2} (73.71 sq mi)

Population (October 1, 2020)
  - Total: 2,389
  - Density: 12.51/km^{2} (32.41/sq mi)
- Time zone: UTC+09:00 (JST)
- Website: www.town.uryu.hokkaido.jp

Uryū (雨竜町, Uryū-chō) is a town located in Sorachi Subprefecture, Hokkaido, Japan.

As of 1 October 2020, the town has an estimated population of 2,389, and a density of 12.5 persons per km^{2}. The total area is 190.91 square kilometres (73.71 mi^{2}).

== Etymology ==
The name of the town is from the Ainu language, but the origin of name has been lost. Urir-o-pet, one possibility, means "cormorant river".

In Japanese, the name of the town is written with ateji, or kanji characters used to phonetically represent native or borrowed words. The first, 雨, means "rain", and the second, 竜, means "dragon".

== Neighboring municipalities ==
- Rumoi Subprefecture
  - Mashike
- Sorachi Subprefecture
  - Hokuryū
  - Moseushi
  - Shintotsukawa
  - Takikawa
