= Horokanai =

Horokanai 幌加内町
- Town
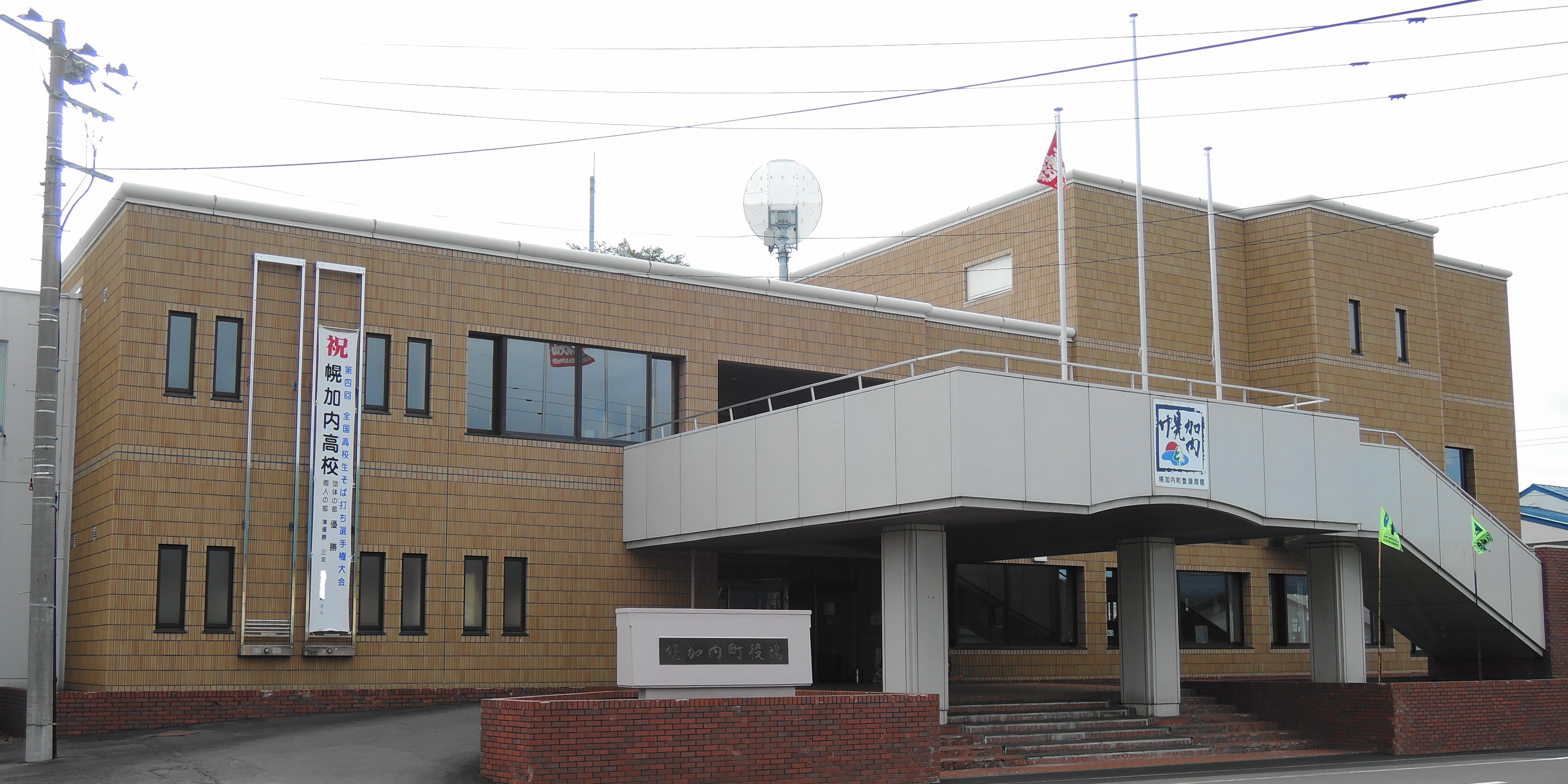
- Horokanai town hall

- Flag Emblem

- Location of Horokanai in Hokkaido (Kamikawa Subprefecture)

- Location in Japan
- Coordinates: 44°1′N 142°9′E
- Country: Japan
- Region: Hokkaido
- Prefecture: Hokkaido (Kamikawa Subprefecture)
- District: Uryū

Area
  - Total: 767.03 km^{2} (296.15 sq mi)

Population (September 30, 2016)
  - Total: 1,571
  - Density: 2.048/km^{2} (5.305/sq mi)
- Time zone: UTC+09:00 (JST)
- Website: www.town.horokanai.hokkaido.jp

Horokanai (幌加内町, Horokanai-chō) is a Japanese town in Kamikawa Subprefecture, Hokkaido. As of September 2016, the town has an estimated population of 1,571. The total area is 767.03 km^{2} (296.15 sq mi).

== History ==
On April 1, 2010, Horokanai was transferred from Sorachi Subprefecture to Kamikawa Subprefecture.

== Culture ==
=== Mascot ===
Horomin, the town's mascot

Horokanai's mascot is Horomin (ほろみん). She is a healthy and hard working buckwheat seed. She carries a soba choko and chopsticks to eat her homemade soba noodles. She wears traditional Japanese chef clothing and a buckwheat flower on her head. She carries a huge stick that doubles as a staff weapon on her back. She was unveiled on 18 June 2013.

== Climate ==
Horokanai has a humid continental climate (Köppen: Dfb). On December 31, 2020, a minimum temperature of −32.6 °C (−26.7 °F) was registered.

Climate data for Horokanai, elevation 159 m (522 ft), (1991−2020 normals, extremes 1977−present)
Month	Jan	Feb	Mar	Apr	May	Jun	Jul	Aug	Sep	Oct	Nov	Dec	Year
Record high °C (°F)	6.1 (43.0)	8.1 (46.6)	11.8 (53.2)	24.3 (75.7)	32.3 (90.1)	36.0 (96.8)	37.3 (99.1)	36.5 (97.7)	31.5 (88.7)	25.2 (77.4)	18.9 (66.0)	10.8 (51.4)	37.3 (99.1)
Mean daily maximum °C (°F)	−3.9 (25.0)	−2.7 (27.1)	1.7 (35.1)	8.4 (47.1)	16.7 (62.1)	21.7 (71.1)	25.2 (77.4)	25.4 (77.7)	21.0 (69.8)	13.9 (57.0)	5.2 (41.4)	−1.7 (28.9)	10.9 (51.6)
Daily mean °C (°F)	−8.4 (16.9)	−7.7 (18.1)	−3.0 (26.6)	3.2 (37.8)	10.5 (50.9)	15.7 (60.3)	19.7 (67.5)	20.0 (68.0)	15.3 (59.5)	8.4 (47.1)	1.5 (34.7)	−5.2 (22.6)	5.8 (42.5)
Mean daily minimum °C (°F)	−14.5 (5.9)	−14.5 (5.9)	−9.2 (15.4)	−2.2 (28.0)	4.5 (40.1)	10.5 (50.9)	15.1 (59.2)	15.5 (59.9)	10.1 (50.2)	3.3 (37.9)	−2.4 (27.7)	−9.8 (14.4)	0.5 (33.0)
Record low °C (°F)	−36.1 (−33.0)	−37.6 (−35.7)	−31.4 (−24.5)	−19.3 (−2.7)	−4.8 (23.4)	−0.4 (31.3)	4.3 (39.7)	5.1 (41.2)	−0.1 (31.8)	−7.1 (19.2)	−21.7 (−7.1)	−32.6 (−26.7)	−37.6 (−35.7)
Average precipitation mm (inches)	120.9 (4.76)	97.3 (3.83)	80.3 (3.16)	63.4 (2.50)	81.0 (3.19)	71.1 (2.80)	144.2 (5.68)	161.4 (6.35)	169.3 (6.67)	161.0 (6.34)	182.7 (7.19)	171.3 (6.74)	1,503.9 (59.21)
Average snowfall cm (inches)	278 (109)	231 (91)	181 (71)	48 (19)	1 (0.4)	0 (0)	0 (0)	0 (0)	0 (0)	4 (1.6)	157 (62)	326 (128)	1,226 (482)
Average extreme snow depth cm (inches)	167 (66)	192 (76)	188 (74)	130 (51)	19 (7.5)	0 (0)	0 (0)	0 (0)	0 (0)	3 (1.2)	57 (22)	129 (51)	195 (77)
Average precipitation days (≥ 1.0 mm)	22.1	18.6	17.3	12.1	11.6	9.6	11.1	12.1	14.1	17.6	21.3	25.2	192.7
Average snowy days (≥ 3.0 cm)	22.1	19.2	17.1	6.3	0.2	0	0	0	0	0.6	11.2	23.3	100
Mean monthly sunshine hours	42.4	56.0	102.7	146.3	182.4	161.1	151.8	146.1	140.9	109.8	46.0	22.1	1,307.6
Source 1: JMA
Source 2: JMA

Climate data for Shumarinai, Horokanai (elevation 255 m, 1991–2020 normals, extremes 1978–present)
Month	Jan	Feb	Mar	Apr	May	Jun	Jul	Aug	Sep	Oct	Nov	Dec	Year
Record high °C (°F)	5.2 (41.4)	12.9 (55.2)	12.9 (55.2)	24.3 (75.7)	29.9 (85.8)	34.3 (93.7)	34.9 (94.8)	34.3 (93.7)	30.4 (86.7)	26.1 (79.0)	18.3 (64.9)	9.5 (49.1)	34.9 (94.8)
Mean daily maximum °C (°F)	−4.4 (24.1)	−3.4 (25.9)	1.0 (33.8)	7.5 (45.5)	15.4 (59.7)	20.5 (68.9)	23.9 (75.0)	24.2 (75.6)	19.9 (67.8)	12.9 (55.2)	4.2 (39.6)	−2.4 (27.7)	9.9 (49.8)
Daily mean °C (°F)	−9.1 (15.6)	−8.6 (16.5)	−4.0 (24.8)	2.3 (36.1)	8.7 (47.7)	14.1 (57.4)	18.2 (64.8)	18.6 (65.5)	13.8 (56.8)	7.1 (44.8)	0.5 (32.9)	−5.9 (21.4)	4.7 (40.5)
Mean daily minimum °C (°F)	−15.4 (4.3)	−15.8 (3.6)	−10.6 (12.9)	−3.2 (26.2)	2.1 (35.8)	8.1 (46.6)	13.1 (55.6)	13.9 (57.0)	8.4 (47.1)	1.8 (35.2)	−3.2 (26.2)	−10.6 (12.9)	−0.9 (30.4)
Record low °C (°F)	−35.8 (−32.4)	−33.6 (−28.5)	−33.2 (−27.8)	−18.0 (−0.4)	−6.2 (20.8)	−2.3 (27.9)	1.7 (35.1)	2.7 (36.9)	−1.6 (29.1)	−7.9 (17.8)	−21.0 (−5.8)	−31.5 (−24.7)	−35.8 (−32.4)
Average precipitation mm (inches)	136.6 (5.38)	109.8 (4.32)	100.6 (3.96)	72.4 (2.85)	81.4 (3.20)	76.4 (3.01)	153.9 (6.06)	180.2 (7.09)	187.3 (7.37)	177.6 (6.99)	213.2 (8.39)	207.7 (8.18)	1,698.8 (66.88)
Average snowfall cm (inches)	270 (106)	220 (87)	180 (71)	59 (23)	6 (2.4)	0 (0)	0 (0)	0 (0)	0 (0)	10 (3.9)	179 (70)	343 (135)	1,247 (491)
Average precipitation days (≥ 1.0 mm)	23.2	19.3	18.5	13.1	11.9	9.6	11.1	12.5	14.9	17.6	22.1	26.2	200.1
Mean monthly sunshine hours	44.0	60.9	101.0	152.6	196.7	166.0	148.9	144.4	142.0	106.9	42.7	23.3	1,328.5
Source: Japan Meteorological Agency (1991–2020 normals, extremes 1978–present)
