= Shinshinotsu =

Shinshinotsu 新篠津村
- Village
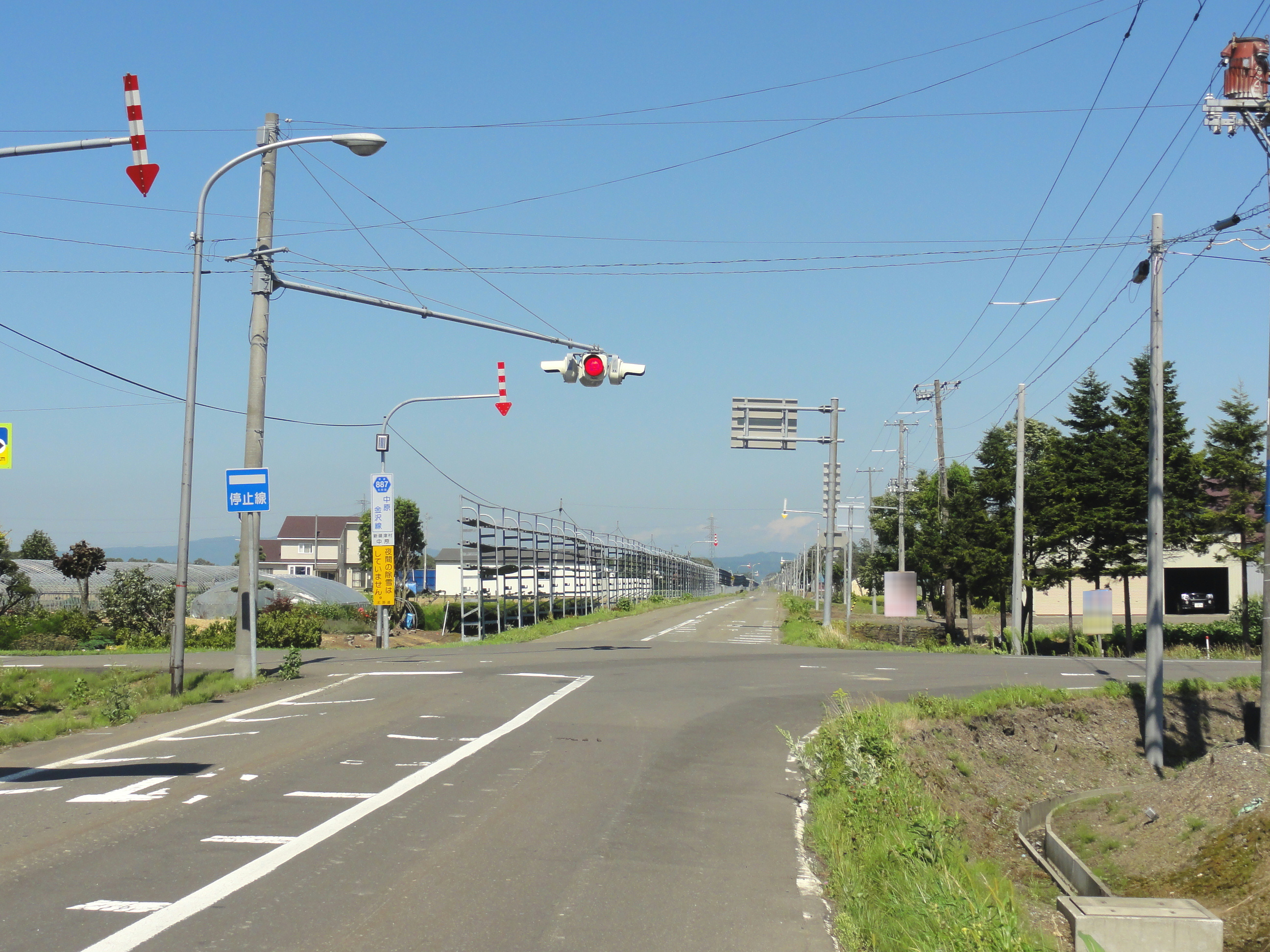
- Street in Shinshinotsu

- Flag Seal

- Location of Shinshinotsu in Hokkaido (Ishikari Subprefecture)

- Location in Japan
- Coordinates: 43°13′N 141°39′E
- Country: Japan
- Region: Hokkaido
- Prefecture: Hokkaido (Ishikari Subprefecture)
- District: Ishikari

Government
  - Mayor: Kiichi Higashide

Area
  - Total: 78.04 km^{2} (30.13 sq mi)

Population (July 31, 2023)
  - Total: 2,833
  - Density: 36.30/km^{2} (94.02/sq mi)
- Time zone: UTC+09:00 (JST)
- City hall address: 13 Daiyonjusitisenkita, Shinshinotsu, Hokkaido; 068-1192
- Climate: Dfb
- Website: www.vill.shinshinotsu.hokkaido.jp
- Symbols
- Flower: Iris ensata
- Mascot: Okome-chan (おこめちゃん)
- Tree: Sorbus commixta

Shinshinotsu (新篠津村, Shinshinotsu-mura) is a village located in Ishikari, Hokkaido, Japan.

As of July 31, 2023 the village had an estimated population of 2,833 and a population density of 36.3 persons per km^{2}. The total area is 78.04 km^{2}.

== Geography ==
Shinshinotsu is the smallest and the only village in Ishikari Subprefecture. Ishikari River flows the east of the village.

=== Neighbouring multiples ===
- Ishikari Subprefecture
  - Ebetsu
  - Tobetsu
- Sorachi Subprefecture
  - Iwamizawa
  - Tsukigata

=== Climate ===
Climate data for Shinshinotsu, Hokkaido (1991−2020 normals, extremes 1978−present)
Month	Jan	Feb	Mar	Apr	May	Jun	Jul	Aug	Sep	Oct	Nov	Dec	Year
Record high °C (°F)	6.7 (44.1)	6.3 (43.3)	14.2 (57.6)	24.0 (75.2)	32.1 (89.8)	32.2 (90.0)	35.1 (95.2)	35.5 (95.9)	32.4 (90.3)	24.4 (75.9)	19.6 (67.3)	13.8 (56.8)	35.5 (95.9)
Mean daily maximum °C (°F)	−2.3 (27.9)	−1.2 (29.8)	2.8 (37.0)	10.3 (50.5)	17.0 (62.6)	21.0 (69.8)	24.6 (76.3)	25.7 (78.3)	22.2 (72.0)	15.5 (59.9)	7.4 (45.3)	0.1 (32.2)	11.9 (53.5)
Daily mean °C (°F)	−6.1 (21.0)	−5.4 (22.3)	−1.2 (29.8)	5.4 (41.7)	11.5 (52.7)	15.8 (60.4)	19.7 (67.5)	20.8 (69.4)	16.9 (62.4)	10.4 (50.7)	3.4 (38.1)	−3.3 (26.1)	7.3 (45.2)
Mean daily minimum °C (°F)	−11.3 (11.7)	−10.9 (12.4)	−5.9 (21.4)	0.7 (33.3)	6.7 (44.1)	11.9 (53.4)	16.2 (61.2)	17.1 (62.8)	12.3 (54.1)	5.5 (41.9)	−0.5 (31.1)	−7.6 (18.3)	2.8 (37.1)
Record low °C (°F)	−26.1 (−15.0)	−27.0 (−16.6)	−21.9 (−7.4)	−11.6 (11.1)	−1.0 (30.2)	3.2 (37.8)	8.0 (46.4)	9.0 (48.2)	2.5 (36.5)	−2.8 (27.0)	−14.9 (5.2)	−26.0 (−14.8)	−27.0 (−16.6)
Average precipitation mm (inches)	107.0 (4.21)	76.7 (3.02)	49.7 (1.96)	45.4 (1.79)	73.2 (2.88)	65.1 (2.56)	109.8 (4.32)	143.4 (5.65)	131.1 (5.16)	106.4 (4.19)	111.6 (4.39)	128.3 (5.05)	1,147.6 (45.18)
Average snowfall cm (inches)	236 (93)	177 (70)	109 (43)	14 (5.5)	0 (0)	0 (0)	0 (0)	0 (0)	0 (0)	0 (0)	71 (28)	231 (91)	820 (323)
Average rainy days	19.4	16.4	13.1	9.9	10.0	8.8	9.6	10.3	11.2	14.5	17.9	21.4	162.5
Average snowy days	21.4	18.3	14.4	2.1	0	0	0	0	0	0.1	6.7	19.6	82.6
Mean monthly sunshine hours	59.2	83.2	137.5	178.9	196.8	177.1	157.9	161.4	166.3	135.3	78.3	46.9	1,578.6
Source 1: JMA
Source 2: JMA

== History ==
- 1895: Shinshinotsu village split off from Shinotsu village (now a part of Ebetsu).
- 1915: Shinshinotsu village became a Second Class village.

== Mascot ==
Okome-chan, the village's mascot

Shinshinotsu's mascot is Okome-chan (おこめちゃん) who is a snowball. It wears a hat that resembles the observatory on Shinotsu Park. Its lips are pink as a result of the side effects of drinking doburoku sake. It cannot drink this sake without rice and side dishes. When people look at it, it reminds them of a rice bowl. Its charm point is its eyes and people can move its eyebrows. Its birthday is August 8. Its goal is to have a depiction of itself on the village's welcome sign.

== Friendship city ==
- Yubetsu, Hokkaido
