= Chippubetsu =

Chippubetsu 秩父別町
- Town
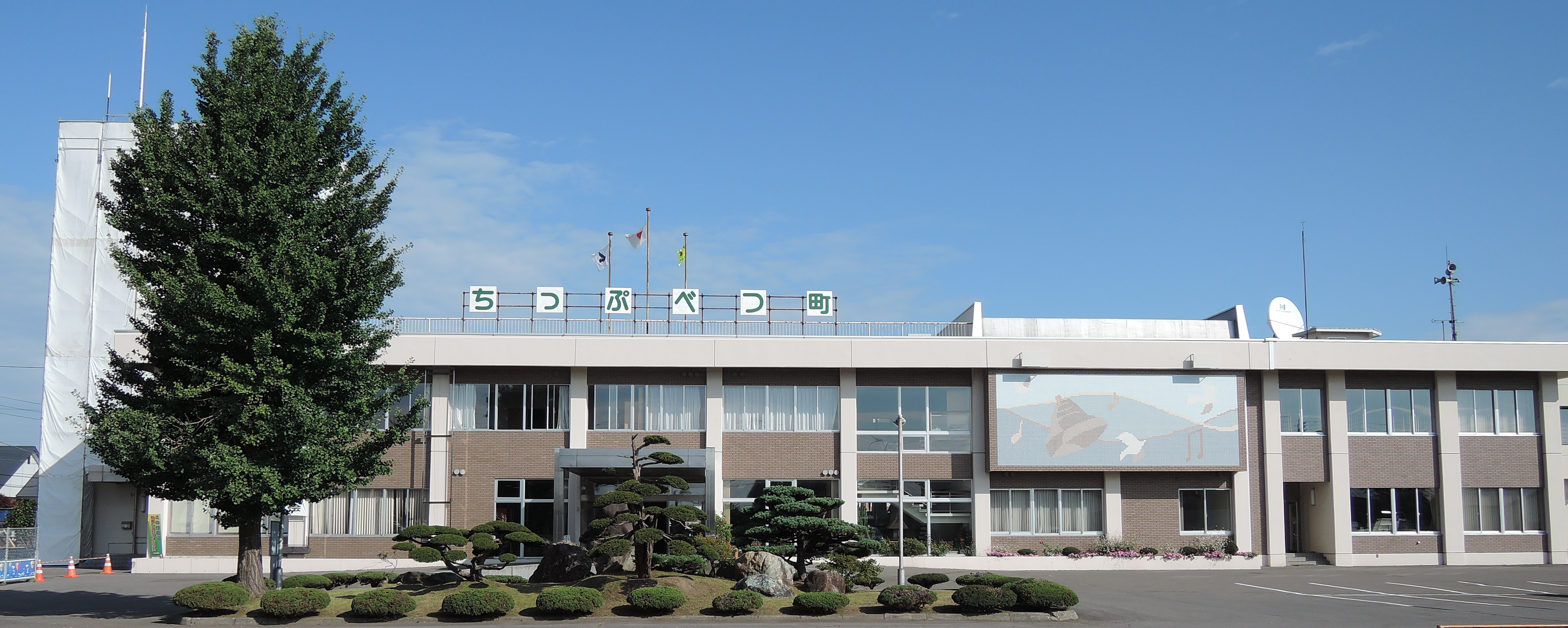
- Chippubetsu town hall

- Flag Emblem

- Location of Chippubetsu in Hokkaido (Sorachi Subprefecture)

- Location in Japan
- Coordinates: 43°46′N 141°57′E
- Country: Japan
- Region: Hokkaido
- Prefecture: Hokkaido (Sorachi Subprefecture)
- District: Uryū

Area
  - Total: 47.26 km^{2} (18.25 sq mi)

Population (October 1, 2020)
  - Total: 2,329
  - Density: 49.28/km^{2} (127.6/sq mi)
- Time zone: UTC+09:00 (JST)
- Website: www.town.chippubetsu.hokkaido.jp

Chippubetsu (秩父別町, Chippubetsu-chō) is a town located in Sorachi Subprefecture, Hokkaido, Japan.

== Demographics ==
Per Japanese census data, the population of Chippubetsu has declined by roughly 50 percent over the past half-century.

Historical population
Year	Pop.	±%
1970	5,036	—
1980	4,193	−16.7%
1990	3,735	−10.9%
2000	3,268	−12.5%
2010	2,730	−16.5%
2020	2,329	−14.7%

== Culture ==
=== Mascot ===
Chibel-kun, the town's mascot

Chippubetsu's mascot is Chibel-kun (チーベルくん, Chīberu-kun). He is a scarecrow with a cape. He usually attends not only events held in Chippubetsu but events outside of the town. His hat can tell time.
