= Numata, Hokkaido =

Numata 沼田町
- Town
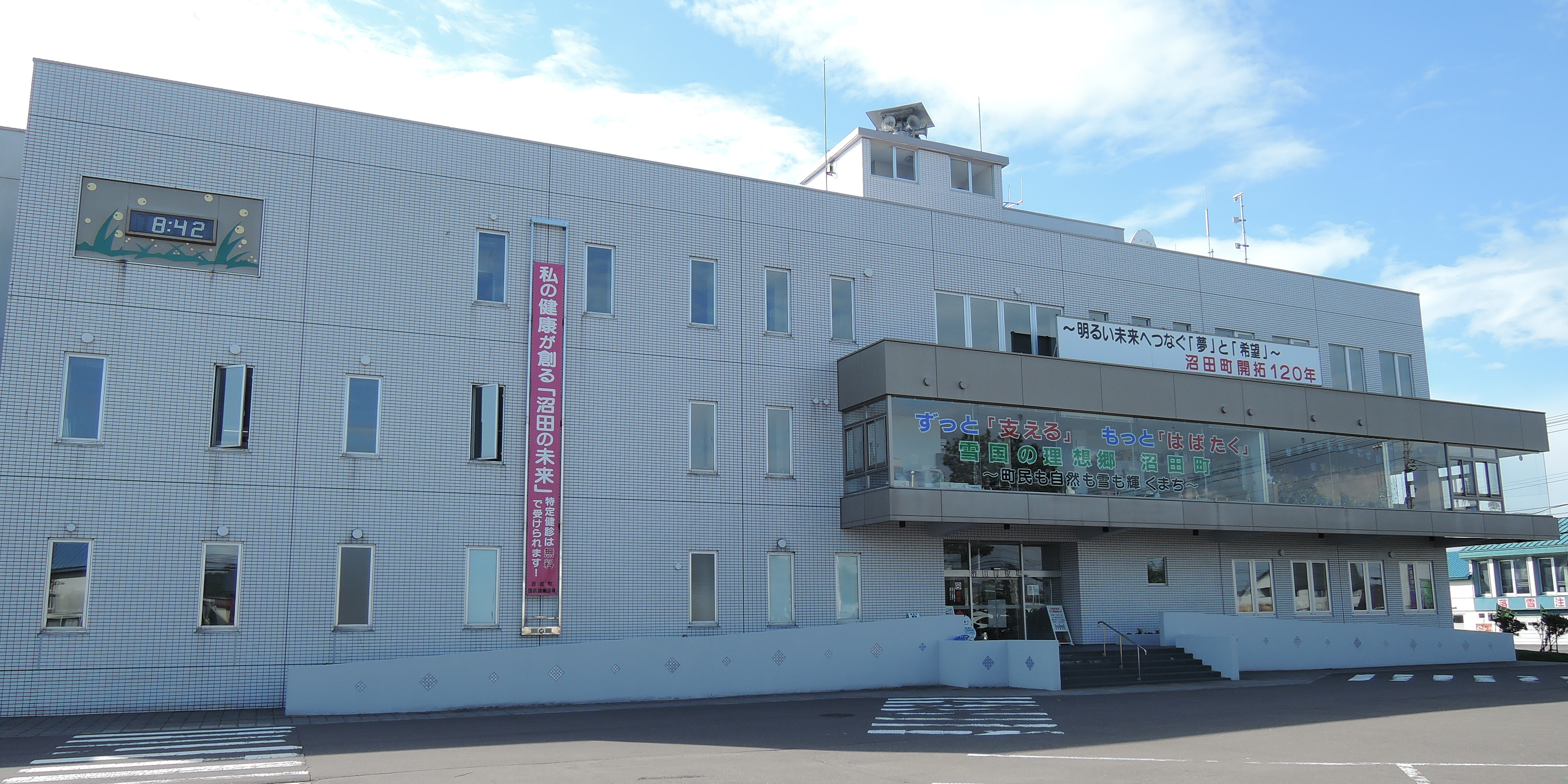
- Numata town hall

- Flag Seal

- Location of Numata in Hokkaido (Sorachi Subprefecture)

- Location in Japan
- Coordinates: 43°48′N 141°56′E
- Country: Japan
- Region: Hokkaido
- Prefecture: Hokkaido (Sorachi Subprefecture)
- District: Uryū

Area
  - Total: 283.21 km^{2} (109.35 sq mi)

Population (October 1, 2020)
  - Total: 2,909
  - Density: 10.27/km^{2} (26.60/sq mi)
- Time zone: UTC+09:00 (JST)
- Website: www.town.numata.hokkaido.jp

Numata (沼田町, Numata-chō) is a town located in Sorachi Subprefecture, Hokkaido, Japan.

== Population ==
As of 1 October 2020, the town has an estimated population of 2,909. The total area is 283.21 km^{2}.

== Culture ==
=== Mascots ===
Pikazo and Sunon-chan, the town's mascots

Numata's mascots are Pikazo (ピカゾー) and Sunon-chan (スノンちゃん). They are snowflake fairies. Pikazo is a blue male snowflake fairy while Sunon-chan is a pink female snowflake fairy.

== Sister-city relations ==
- Port Hardy, British Columbia, Canada since September 1994
