= Nanporo, Hokkaido =

Nanporo 南幌町
- Town
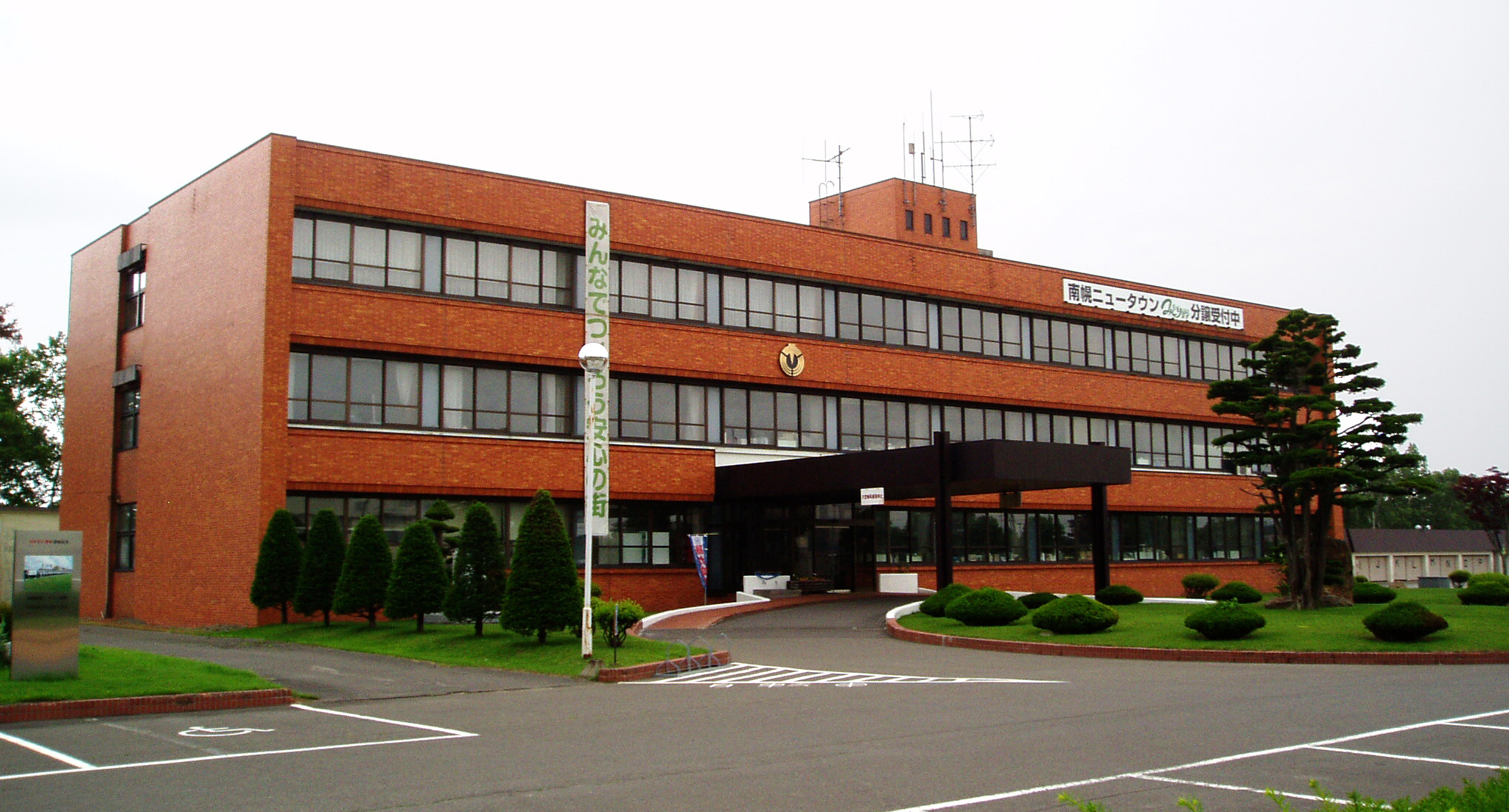
- Nanporo town hall

- Flag Seal

- Location of Nanporo in Hokkaido (Sorachi Subprefecture)

- Location in Japan
- Coordinates: 43°4′N 141°39′E
- Country: Japan
- Region: Hokkaido
- Prefecture: Hokkaido (Sorachi Subprefecture)
- District: Sorachi

Area
  - Total: 81.49 km^{2} (31.46 sq mi)

Population (September 30, 2016)
  - Total: 7,816
  - Density: 95.91/km^{2} (248.4/sq mi)
- Time zone: UTC+09:00 (JST)
- Website: www.town.nanporo.hokkaido.jp

Nanporo (南幌町, Nanporo-chō) is a town located in Sorachi Subprefecture, Hokkaido, Japan. It is a bed town of Sapporo.

As of September 2016, the town has an estimated population of 7,886, and a density of 96 persons per km^{2}. The total area is 81.49 km^{2}.

== Culture ==
=== Mascot ===
Kyabetti-kun, the town's mascot

Nanporo's mascot is Kyabetti-kun (キャベッチくん, Kyabetchi-kun). He is a cabbage that resembles a healthy child and a sun. He has 200 times of energy.
