= Kawakami District, Hokkaido =

District in Hokkaido, Japan

Coordinates: 43°25′30″N 144°31′48″E

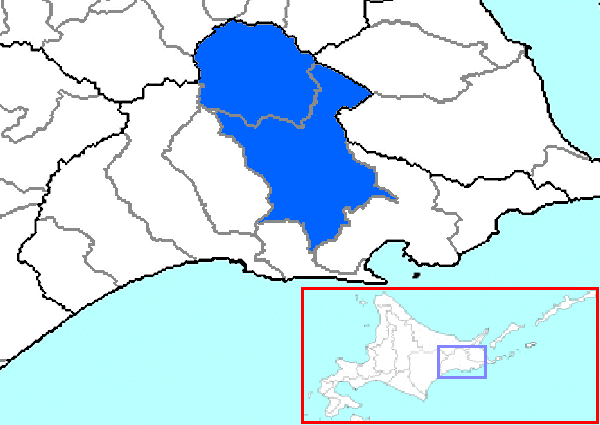
The area of Kawakami District in Kushiro Subprefecture.

Kawakami (川上郡, Kawakami-gun) is a district in north-central Kushiro Subprefecture, Hokkaido, Japan.

== Towns ==
- Shibecha
- Teshikaga
