= Naganuma =

Naganuma 長沼町
- Town
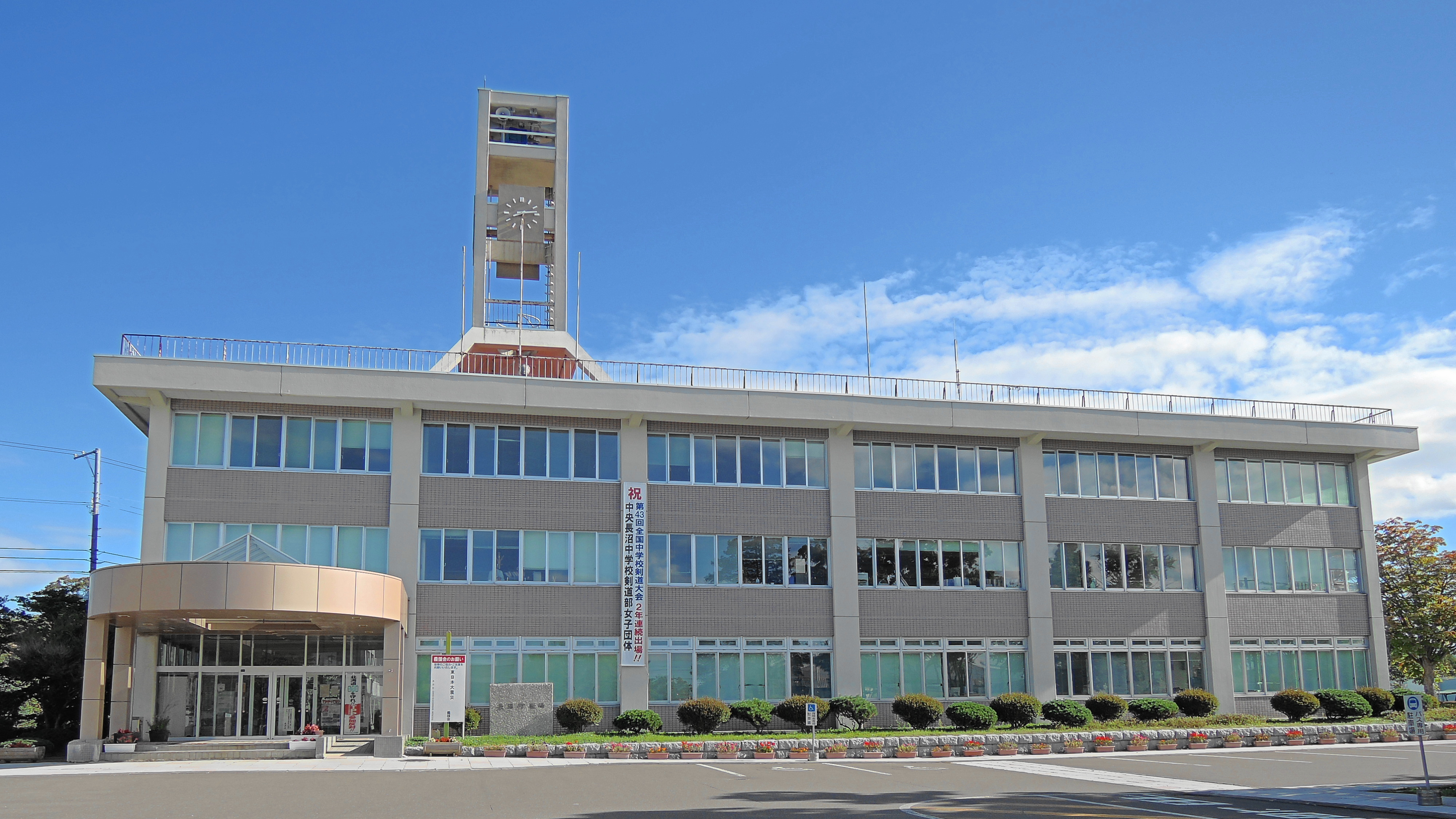
- Naganuma Town hall

- Flag Seal

- Location of Naganuma in Hokkaido (Sorachi Subprefecture)

- Location in Japan
- Coordinates: 43°1′N 141°42′E
- Country: Japan
- Region: Hokkaido
- Prefecture: Hokkaido (Sorachi Subprefecture)
- District: Yūbari

Area
  - Total: 168.36 km^{2} (65.00 sq mi)

Population (September 30, 2016)
  - Total: 11,262
  - Density: 66.892/km^{2} (173.25/sq mi)
- Time zone: UTC+09:00 (JST)
- Website: www.maoi-net.jp

Naganuma (長沼町, Naganuma-chō) is a town located in Sorachi Subprefecture, Hokkaido, Japan.

As of September 2016, the town has an estimated population of 11,262, and a density of 67 persons per km^{2}. The total area is 168.36 km^{2}.
