= Teshio District, Hokkaido =

District in Hokkaido, Japan

Coordinates: 44.986°N 141.86°E

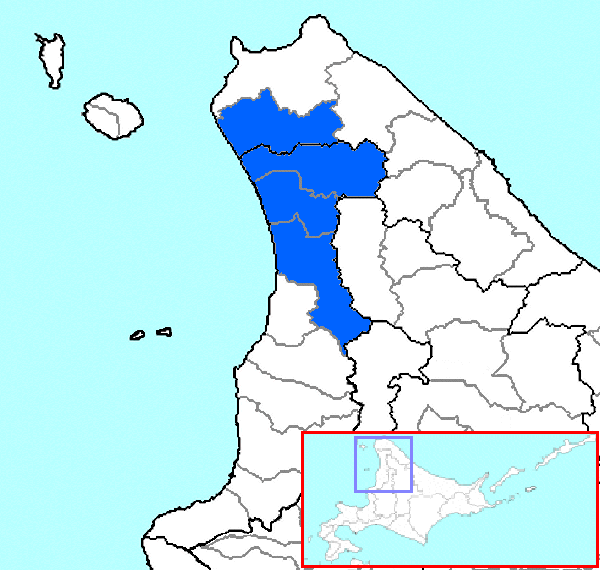
Teshio District in Rumoi and Sōya Subprefecture.

Teshio (天塩郡, Teshio-gun) is a district divided between Rumoi and Sōya Subprefectures, Hokkaido, Japan. At the end of 2009, the district has an estimated population of 13,937 and an area of 2039.11 km^{2}, giving a population density of 6.83 persons per square kilometer.

In 2010, the town of Horonobe was transferred from Rumoi Subprefecture to Sōya Subprefecture.

== Towns ==
=== Rumoi Subprefecture ===
- Enbetsu
- Teshio

=== Sōya Prefecture ===
- Horonobe
- Toyotomi
