= Yūbari District, Hokkaido =

District in Hokkaido, Japan

Coordinates: 43.000°N 141.759°E

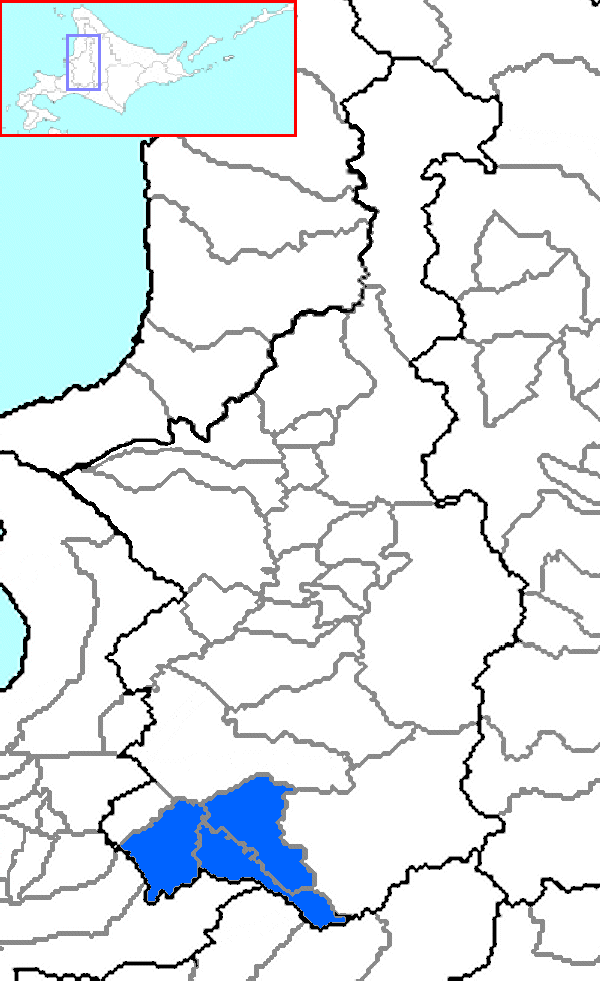
Yūbari District in Sorachi Subprefecture.

Yūbari (夕張郡, Yūbari-gun) is a district located in Sorachi Subprefecture, Hokkaido, Japan.

As of 2004, the district has an estimated population of 33,253 and a density of 65.71 persons per km^{2}. The total area is 506.06 km^{2}.

== Towns and villages ==
- Kuriyama
- Naganuma
- Yuni
