= Kamikawa (Tokachi) District, Hokkaido =

District in Hokkaido, Japan

Coordinates: 43.012°N 142.866°E

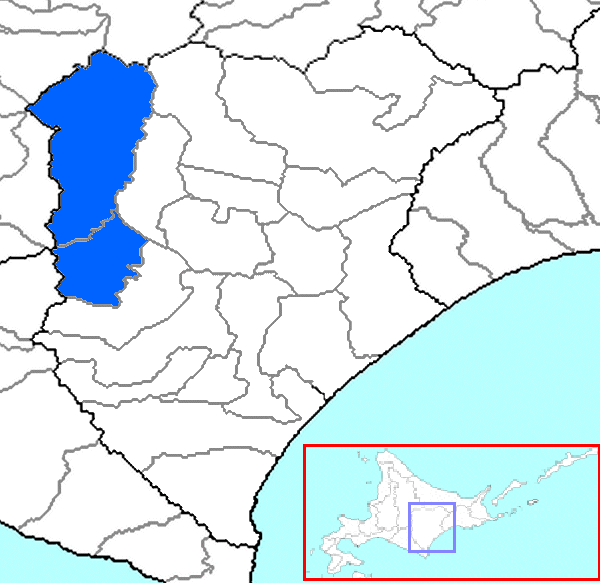
The area of Kamikawa District in Tokachi Subprefecture.

Kamikawa (上川郡, Kamikawa-gun) is a district located in Tokachi Subprefecture, Hokkaido, Japan.

As of 2004, the district has an estimated population of 18,064 and a density of 12.32 persons per km^{2}. The total area is 1,465.97 km^{2}.

== Towns ==
- Shimizu
- Shintoku

== History ==
- 1869 – Upon the establishment of provinces and districts in Hokkaido, Kamikawa District established in Tokachi Province.
- September, 1920 – Borders of Memuro Town in Kasai District modified, part of it incorporated into Shimizu Town
- September 30, 1951 – Shimizu Town incorporates Mikage Village (御影村) in Kasai District
