= Moseushi, Hokkaido =

Moseushi 妹背牛町
- Town
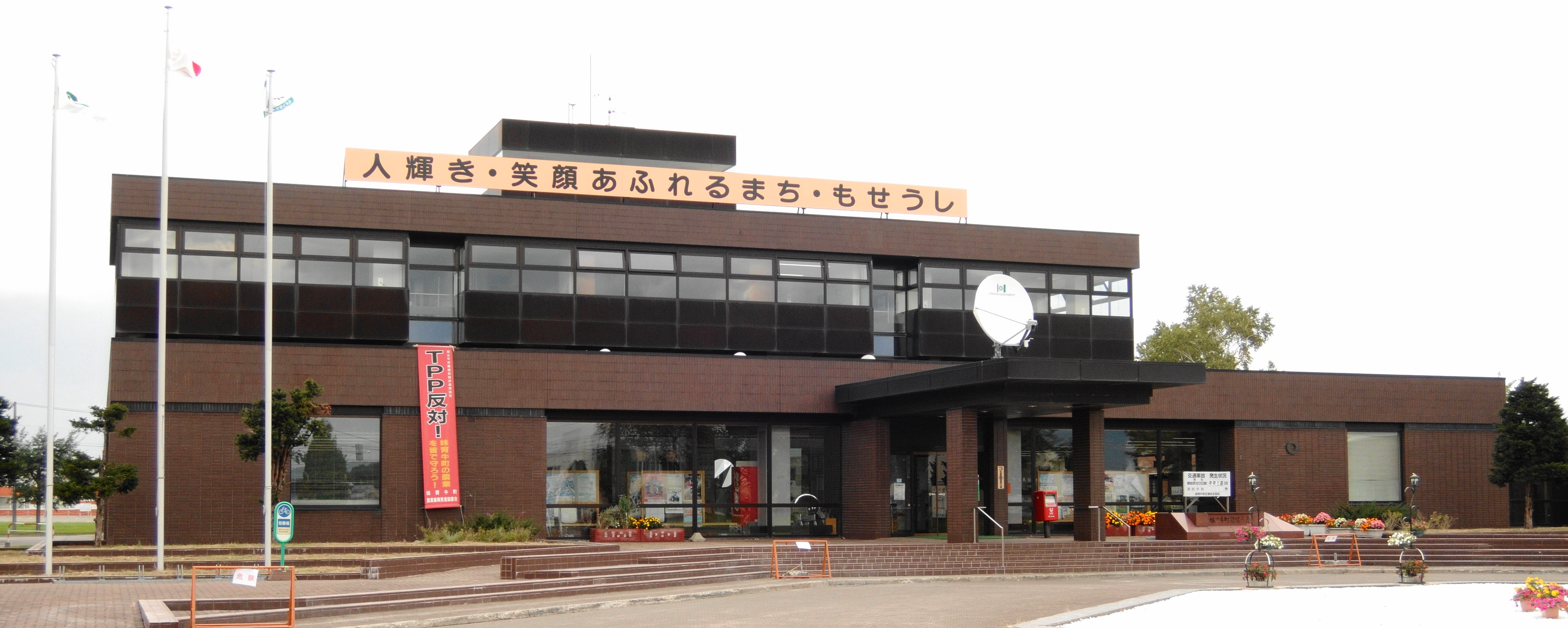
- Moseushi town hall

- Flag Emblem

- Location of Moseushi in Hokkaido (Sorachi Subprefecture)

- Location in Japan
- Coordinates: 43°42′N 141°58′E
- Country: Japan
- Region: Hokkaido
- Prefecture: Hokkaido (Sorachi Subprefecture)
- District: Uryū

Area
  - Total: 48.55 km^{2} (18.75 sq mi)

Population (September 30, 2016)
  - Total: 3,134
  - Density: 64.55/km^{2} (167.2/sq mi)
- Time zone: UTC+09:00 (JST)
- Website: www.town.moseushi.hokkaido.jp

Moseushi (妹背牛町, Moseushi-chō) is a town located in Sorachi Subprefecture, Hokkaido, Japan.

As of September 2016, the town has an estimated population of 3,134. The total area is 48.55 km^{2}.

== Culture ==
=== Mascot ===
Utchi, the town's mascot

Moseushi's mascot is Utchi (ウッチー). She is a farmer cow. She usually is assisted by Aimo-chan (あいもちゃん), Ushimaru (牛丸) and an unnamed bathing cow.
