= Sorachi Subprefecture =

Coordinates: 43°11′51″N 141°45′59″E

Sorachi Subprefecture 空知総合振興局
- Sorachi-sōgō-shinkō-kyoku
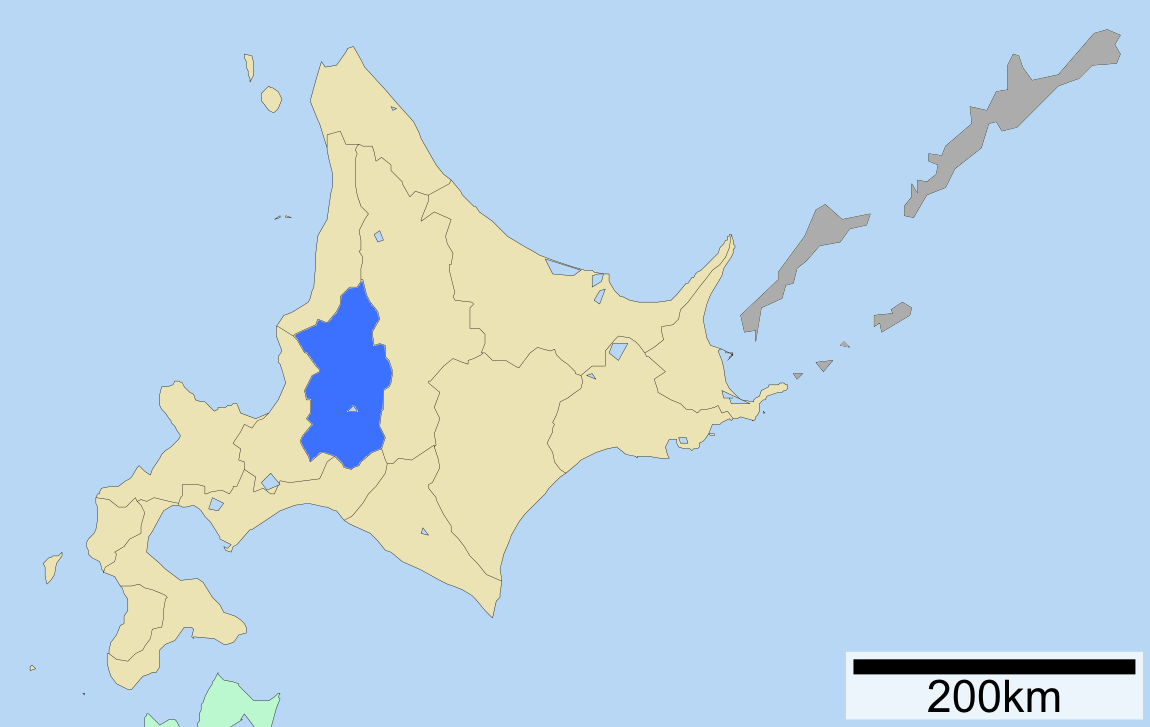
- Prefecture: Hokkaido
- Capital: Iwamizawa

Area
  - Total: 6,558.22 km^{2} (2,532.14 sq mi)

Population (March 2009)
  - Total: 365,563
  - Density: 56/km^{2} (140/sq mi)
- Website: sorachi.pref.hokkaido.lg.jp

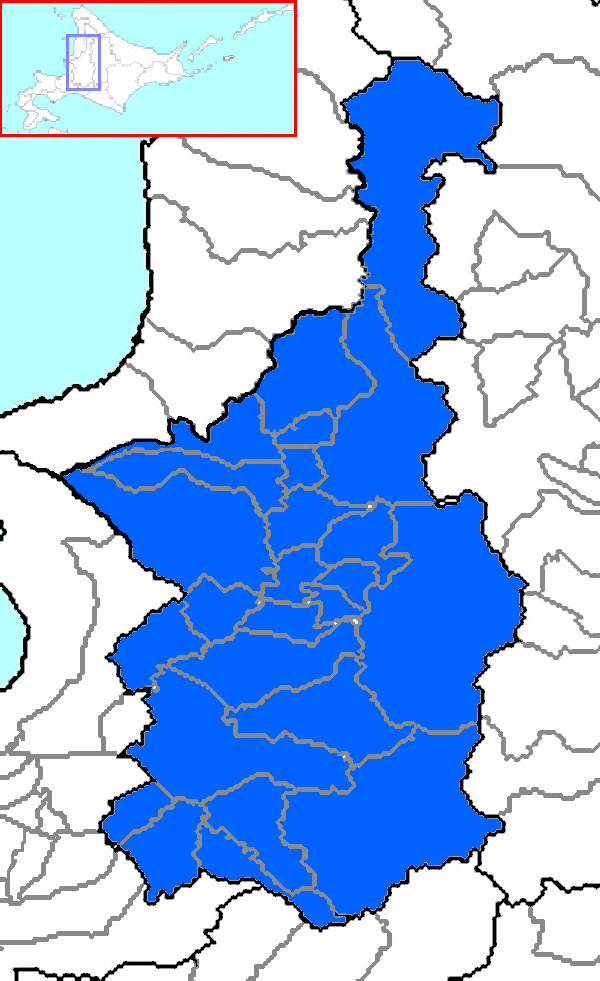
Sorachi Subprefecture (with Horokanai)

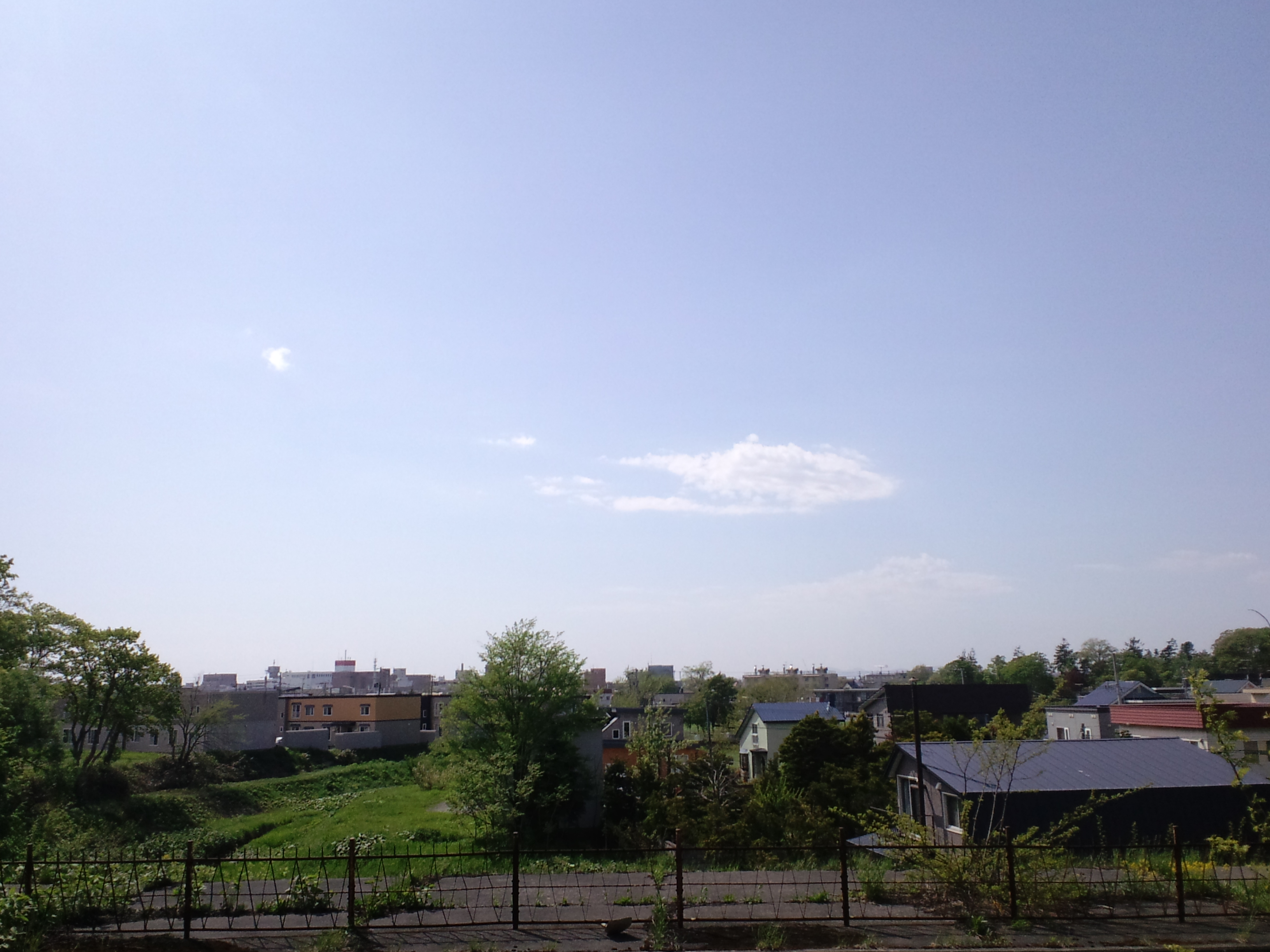
Iwamizawa City

Sorachi Subprefecture (空知総合振興局, Sorachi-sōgō-shinkō-kyoku) is a subprefecture of Hokkaido Prefecture, Japan. As of 2004, its estimated population is 373,736 and its area is 6,558.26 km^{2}.

== Geography ==
=== Cities ===
10 cities are located in Sorachi Subprefecture:

Name		Area (km^{2})	Population	Map
Rōmaji	Kanji	Area (km^{2})	Population	Map
Akabira	赤平市	129.88	10,686	
Ashibetsu	芦別市	865.02	14,260	
Bibai	美唄市	277.61	24,768	
Fukagawa	深川市	529.12	21,618	
Iwamizawa (capital)	岩見沢市	481.1	84,127	
Mikasa	三笠市	302.64	9,056	
Sunagawa	砂川市	78.69	17,589	
Takikawa	滝川市	115.9	41,306	
Utashinai	歌志内市	55.99	3,019	
Yūbari	夕張市	763.2	8,612	

=== Towns and villages by district ===
These are the towns and villages in each district:

Name		Area (km^{2})	Population	District	Type	Map
Rōmaji	Kanji	Area (km^{2})	Population	District	Type	Map
Chippubetsu	秩父別町	47.26	2,463	Uryū District	Town	
Hokuryū	北竜町	158.82	1,965	Uryū District	Town	
Kamisunagawa	上砂川町	39.91	3,278	Sorachi District	Town	
Kuriyama	栗山町	203.84	12,365	Yūbari District	Town	
Moseushi	妹背牛町	48.55	3,134	Uryū District	Town	
Naganuma	長沼町	168.36	11,262	Yūbari District	Town	
Naie	奈井江町	88.05	5,664	Sorachi District	Town	
Nanporo	南幌町	81.49	7,816	Sorachi District	Town	
Numata	沼田町	283.21	3,207	Uryū District	Town	
Shintotsukawa	新十津川町	495.62	6,787	Kabato District	Town	
Tsukigata	月形町	151.05	3,429	Kabato District	Town	
Urausu	浦臼町	101.08	1,983	Kabato District	Town	
Uryū	雨竜町	190.91	2,546	Uryū District	Town	
Yuni	由仁町	133.86	5,426	Yūbari District	Town	

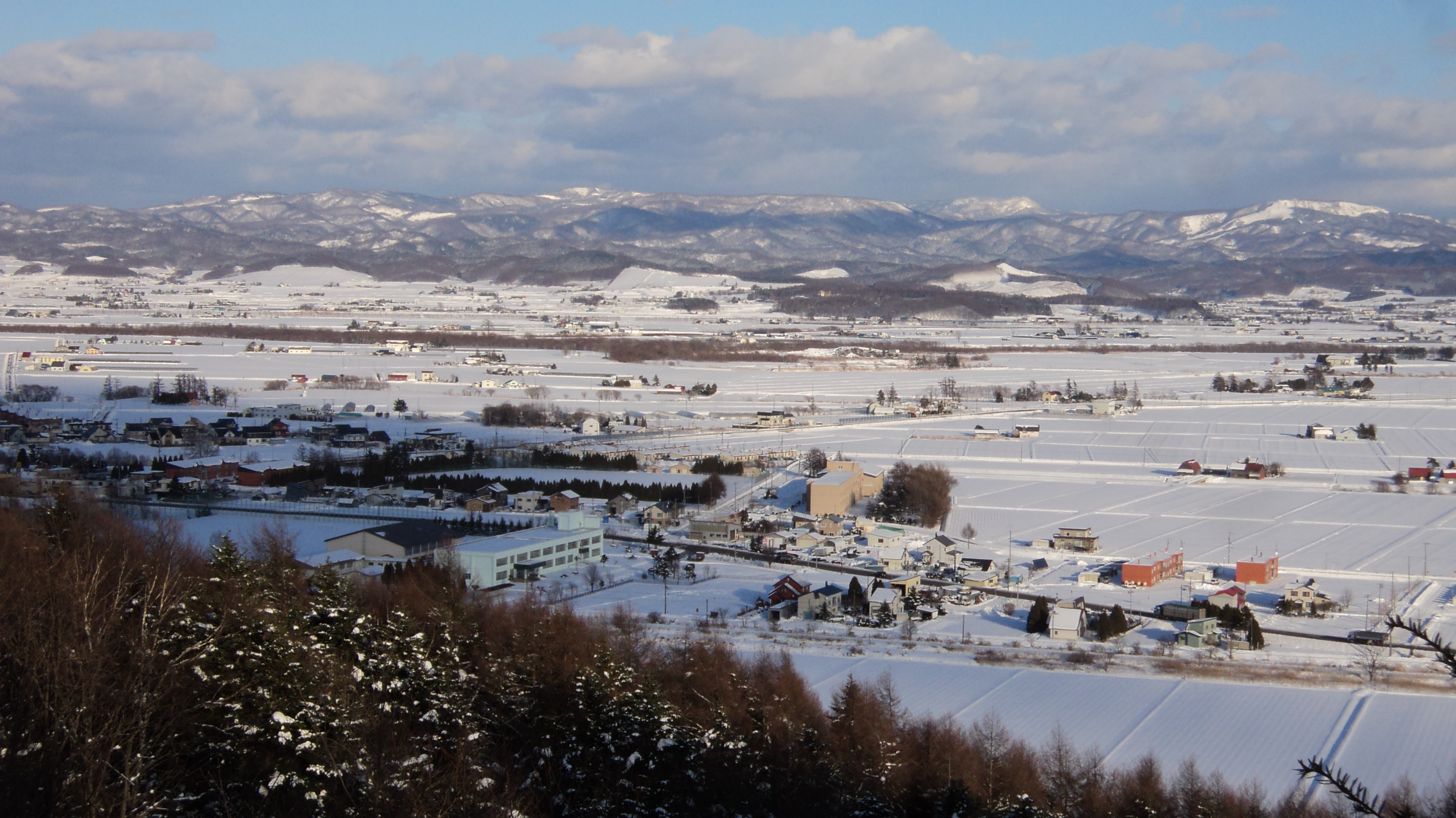
Panorama of Yuni, a village in Yubari district

== History ==
- 1897: Sorachi Subprefecture established.
- 1899: Furano Village (now Kamifurano Town, Nakafurano Town, Furano City, and Minamifurano Town) transferred to Kamikawa Subprefecture.
- 2010: Horokanai town from Uryū District transferred to Kamikawa Subprefecture.
