= Hokuryū, Hokkaido =

Hokuryū 北竜町
- Town
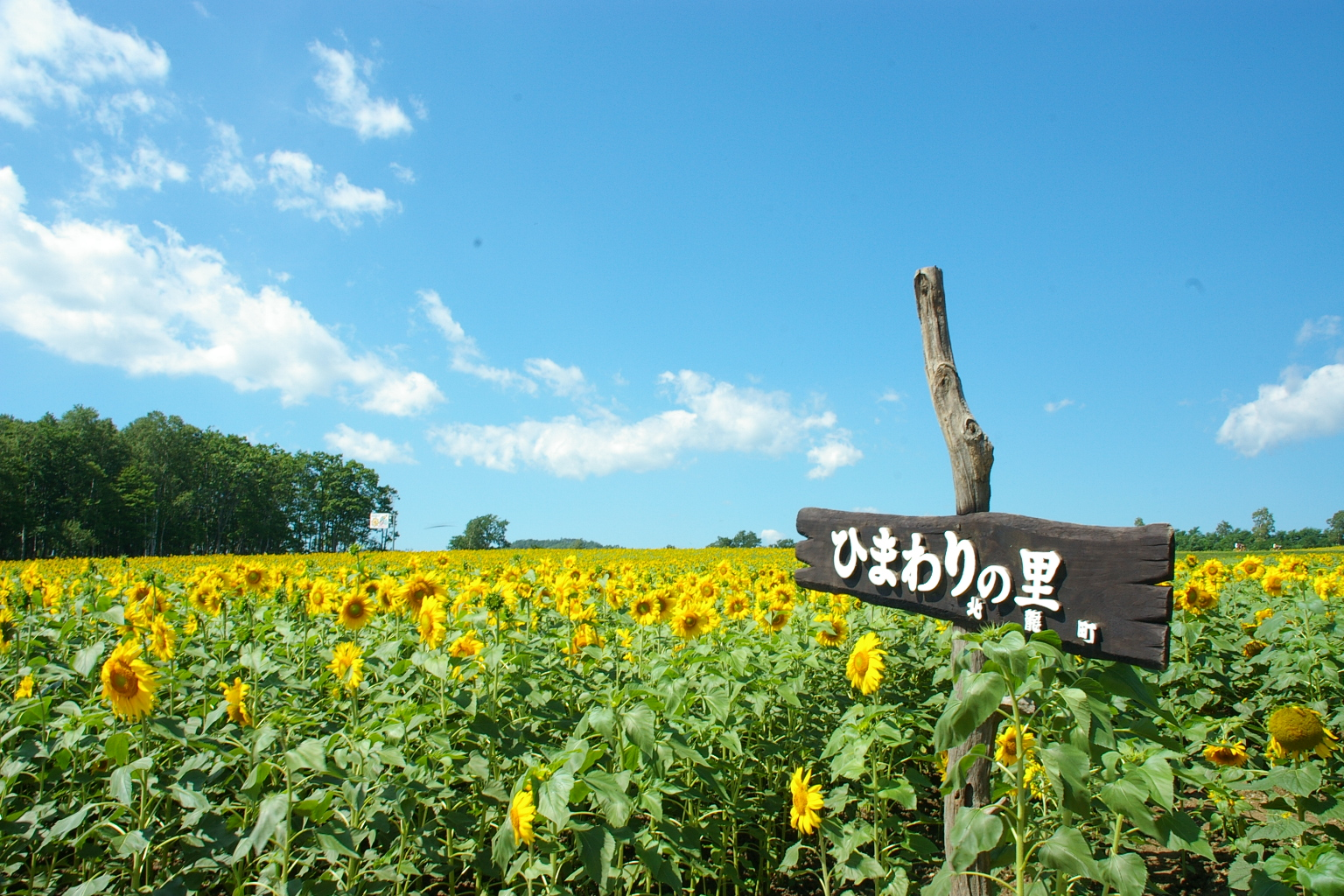
- Sunflower field in Hokuryu town

- Flag Emblem

- Location of Hokuryū in Hokkaido (Sorachi Subprefecture)

- Location in Japan
- Coordinates: 43°44′N 141°53′E
- Country: Japan
- Region: Hokkaido
- Prefecture: Hokkaido (Sorachi Subprefecture)
- District: Uryū

Area
  - Total: 158.82 km^{2} (61.32 sq mi)

Population (October 1, 2020)
  - Total: 1,724
  - Density: 10.86/km^{2} (28.11/sq mi)
- Time zone: UTC+09:00 (JST)
- Website: www.town.hokuryu.hokkaido.jp

Hokuryū (北竜町, Hokuryū-chō) is a town located in Sorachi Subprefecture, Hokkaido, Japan.

As of 1 October 2020, the town has an estimated population of 1,724, and a density of 11 persons per km^{2}. The total area is 158.82 km^{2}.

It is home to the Hokuryū Sunflower Village, the largest sunflower fields in Japan, where more than a million sunflowers bloom between July and August.

== Culture ==
=== Mascot ===
Himawari Saki-chan, the town's mascot

Hokuryū's mascot is Himawari Saki-chan (ひまわり咲ちゃん). She is a sunflower who attends Hokuryū's various events and promotes products and tourism of the town. She was unveiled in March 1991.
