= Kunneppu, Hokkaido =

Kunneppu 訓子府町
- Town
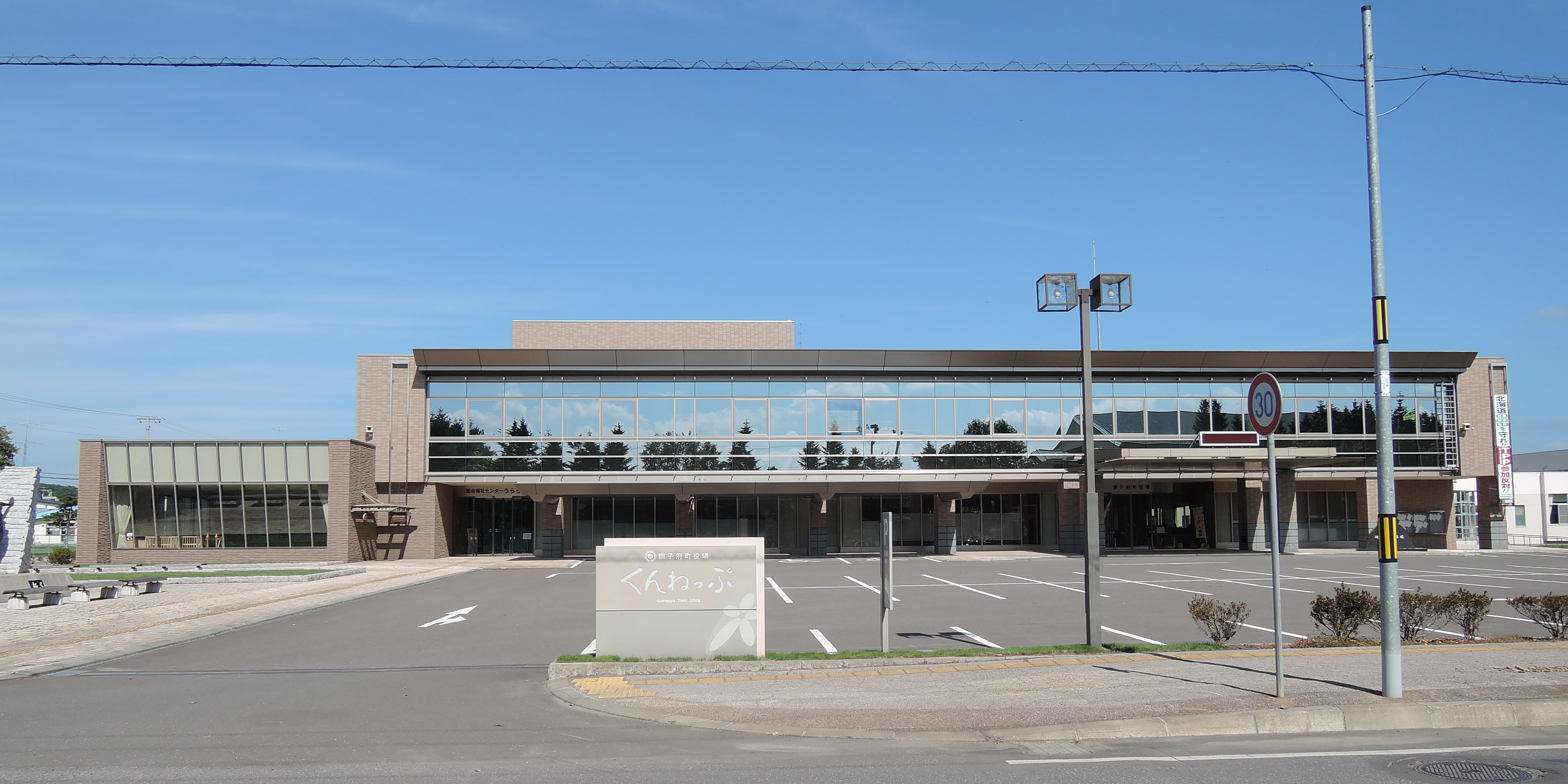
- Kunneppu town hall

- Flag Emblem

- Location of Kunneppu in Hokkaido (Okhotsk Subprefecture)

- Location in Japan
- Coordinates: 43°44′N 143°44′E
- Country: Japan
- Region: Hokkaido
- Prefecture: Hokkaido (Okhotsk Subprefecture)
- District: Tokoro

Area
  - Total: 190.89 km^{2} (73.70 sq mi)

Population (September 30, 2016)
  - Total: 5,227
  - Density: 27.38/km^{2} (70.92/sq mi)
- Time zone: UTC+09:00 (JST)
- Website: www.town.kunneppu.hokkaido.jp

Kunneppu (訓子府町, Kunneppu-chō) is a town located in Okhotsk, Hokkaido, Japan. In the Ainu language, kunnepu means 'black river'.

As of September 2016, the town has an estimated population of 5,227 and a density of 27 persons per km^{2}. The total area is 190.89 square kilometers (73.70 sq mi).

== Research ==
Kunneppu is the site of the Kitami Agricultural Experiment Station, an arm of the Hokkaido Research Organization, that works to create and study plant science and breeding techniques for increased and sustainable food production.

== Mascots ==
Meloneppu and Tamaneppu, the town's mascots

Kunneppu's mascots are Meloneppu (めろねっぷ) and Tamaneppu (たまねっぷ).

- Meloneppu is a melon and onion mouse. Her tail (which is her charm point) resembles a melon vine. She has melon marks which depicted an outline of Hokkaido on her torso and the kanji "訓" on her right ear.
- Tamaneppu is an mischievous yet fine onion fairy. She is a fairy farmer. She drinks milk to make her body grow. She wears cow-pattern overalls with star buttons. The buttons were made from stars from the sky.
