= Uryū District =

District in Hokkaido, Japan

Coordinates: 43°42′36″N 141°52′12″E

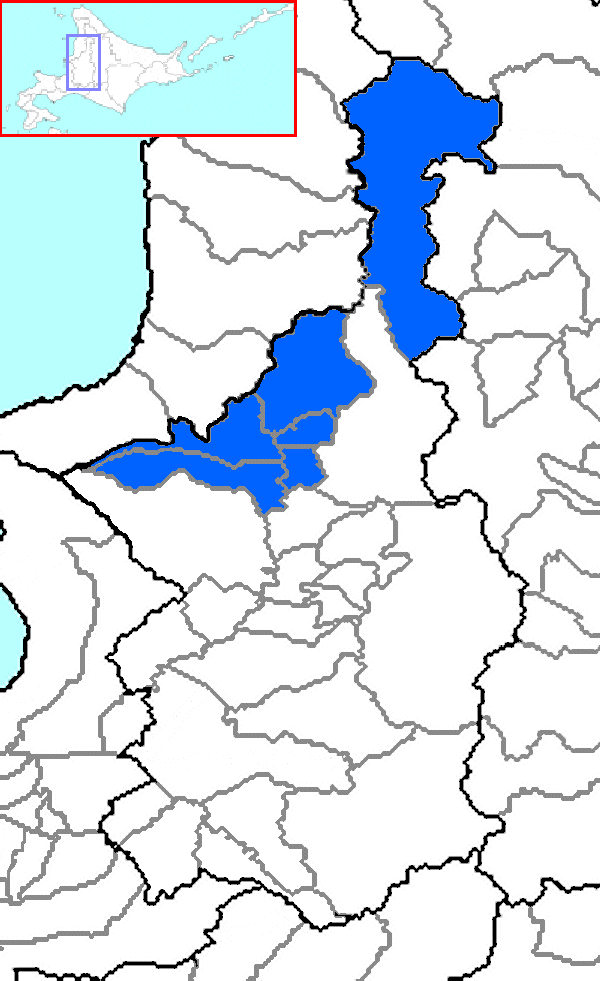
Uryū District in Sorachi and Kamikawa Subprefecture.

Uryū (雨竜郡, Uryū-gun) is a district divided between Sorachi and Kamikawa Subprefectures, Hokkaido, Japan.

As of 2004, the district has an estimated population of 18,996 and a density of 12.70 persons per km^{2}. The total area is 1,495.78 km^{2}.

== Towns and villages ==
=== Kamikawa Subprefecture ===
- Horokanai

=== Sorachi Subprefecture ===
- Chippubetsu
- Hokuryū
- Moseushi
- Numata
- Uryū

== Changes ==
On April 1, 2010, Horokanai was transferred from Sorachi Subprefecture to Kamikawa Subprefecture. As such Uryū District was now also part of the latter subprefecture.
