= Naie, Hokkaido =

Naie 奈井江町
- Town
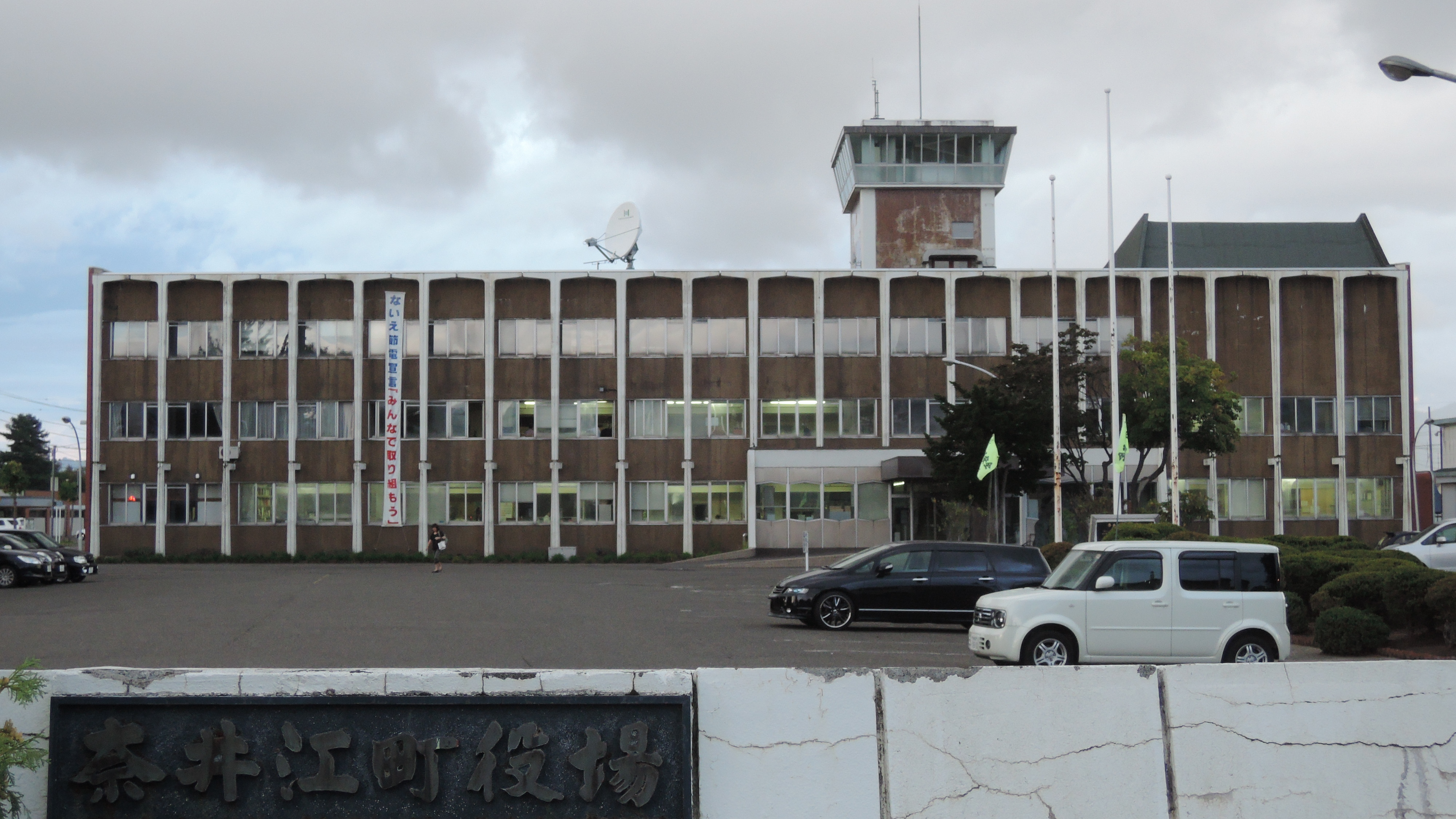
- Naie town hall

- Flag Seal

- Location of Naie in Hokkaido (Sorachi Subprefecture)

- Location in Japan
- Coordinates: 43°26′N 141°53′E
- Country: Japan
- Region: Hokkaido
- Prefecture: Hokkaido (Sorachi Subprefecture)
- District: Sorachi

Area
  - Total: 88.05 km^{2} (34.00 sq mi)

Population (October 1, 2020)
  - Total: 5,120
  - Density: 58.1/km^{2} (151/sq mi)
- Time zone: UTC+09:00 (JST)
- Website: www.town.naie.hokkaido.jp

Naie (奈井江町, Naie-chō) is a town located in Sorachi Subprefecture, Hokkaido, Japan.

As of 1 October 2020, the town has an estimated population of 5,120. The total area is 88.05 km^{2}.

== Transportation ==
Naie is linked with the Dōō Expressway or the Dōō Expressway (Hokkaidō Expressway) with its interchange.

== History ==
In the past, the town flourished as a centre of the coal industry, but its population has since declined sharply.
