= Kamifurano =

Kamifurano 上富良野町
- Town
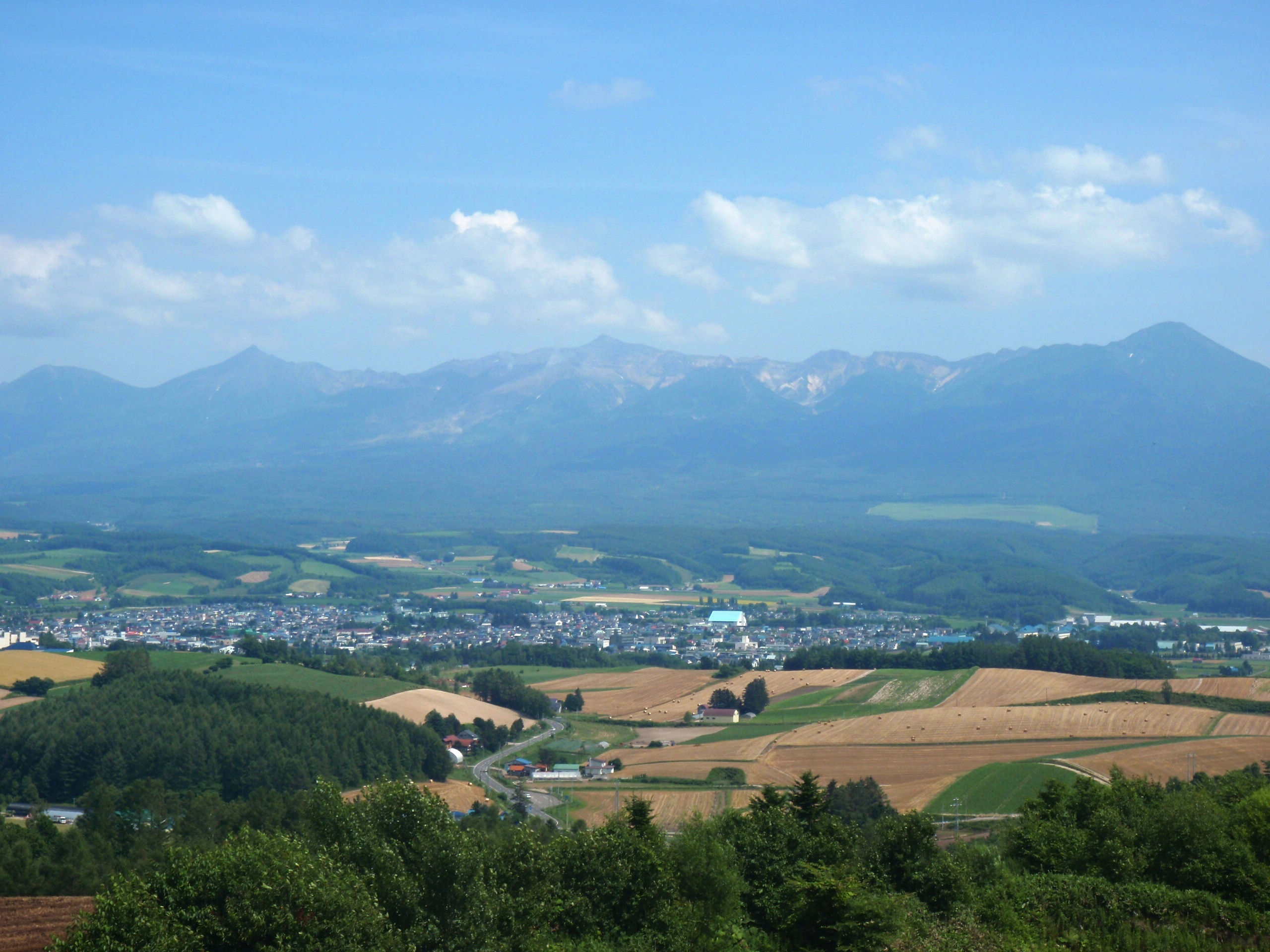
- View of Kamifurano

- Flag Emblem

- Location of Kamifurano in Hokkaido (Kamikawa Subprefecture)

- Location in Japan
- Coordinates: 43°27′N 142°28′E
- Country: Japan
- Region: Hokkaido
- Prefecture: Hokkaido (Kamikawa Subprefecture)
- District: Sorachi

Area
  - Total: 237.18 km^{2} (91.58 sq mi)

Population (September 30, 2016)
  - Total: 11,053
  - Density: 46.602/km^{2} (120.70/sq mi)
- Time zone: UTC+09:00 (JST)
- Climate: Dfb
- Website: www.town.kamifurano.hokkaido.jp

Kamifurano (上富良野町, Kamifurano-chō) is a town located in Kamikawa Subprefecture, Hokkaido, Japan.

As of September 2016, the town has an estimated population of 11,053 and a density of 47 persons per km^{2}. The total area is 237.18 km^{2}.

== Culture ==
=== Mascot ===
Labeton, the town's mascot

Kamifurano's mascot is Labeton (らべとん, Rabeton). She is a 17-year-old idol pig. Her clothes are scented with lavender. She likes to eat stuff that tastes good (such as kiki pork, a type of tonkatsu) and enjoys hot springs scented with lavender. When she is on her break from idoling, she makes potpourri bags and does gardening. Her favourite colours are pink and purple. She struggles with dieting, being around narrow places and heights but, as an idol, she can overcome them. Per idol tradition, she is forbidden from making any romantic feelings. Her quote is "pure, correct and beautiful" (清く 正しく 美しく). Her birthday is July 28.

== Climate ==
Climate data for Kamifurano, elevation 220 m (720 ft), (1991−2020 normals, extremes 1977−present)
Month	Jan	Feb	Mar	Apr	May	Jun	Jul	Aug	Sep	Oct	Nov	Dec	Year
Record high °C (°F)	7.1 (44.8)	12.6 (54.7)	15.5 (59.9)	27.6 (81.7)	35.4 (95.7)	36.8 (98.2)	37.2 (99.0)	37.5 (99.5)	33.8 (92.8)	27.2 (81.0)	20.9 (69.6)	12.9 (55.2)	37.5 (99.5)
Mean daily maximum °C (°F)	−3.8 (25.2)	−2.2 (28.0)	2.6 (36.7)	10.7 (51.3)	18.3 (64.9)	22.8 (73.0)	26.3 (79.3)	26.4 (79.5)	21.9 (71.4)	14.7 (58.5)	6.2 (43.2)	−1.1 (30.0)	11.9 (53.4)
Daily mean °C (°F)	−8.1 (17.4)	−7.2 (19.0)	−2.2 (28.0)	5.1 (41.2)	12.1 (53.8)	16.8 (62.2)	20.7 (69.3)	20.9 (69.6)	16.1 (61.0)	9.0 (48.2)	2.0 (35.6)	−5.0 (23.0)	6.7 (44.0)
Mean daily minimum °C (°F)	−13.6 (7.5)	−13.4 (7.9)	−7.8 (18.0)	−0.5 (31.1)	5.9 (42.6)	11.5 (52.7)	16.0 (60.8)	16.4 (61.5)	11.1 (52.0)	3.9 (39.0)	−2.2 (28.0)	−9.8 (14.4)	1.5 (34.6)
Record low °C (°F)	−31.5 (−24.7)	−31.7 (−25.1)	−26.2 (−15.2)	−14.8 (5.4)	−3.0 (26.6)	1.1 (34.0)	5.8 (42.4)	6.5 (43.7)	0.4 (32.7)	−5.4 (22.3)	−18.8 (−1.8)	−25.4 (−13.7)	−31.7 (−25.1)
Average precipitation mm (inches)	44.8 (1.76)	38.0 (1.50)	45.6 (1.80)	47.8 (1.88)	63.6 (2.50)	73.7 (2.90)	123.4 (4.86)	166.8 (6.57)	132.8 (5.23)	90.4 (3.56)	93.4 (3.68)	72.3 (2.85)	993.7 (39.12)
Average precipitation days (≥ 1.0 mm)	15.9	13.8	13.1	11.9	11.9	10.6	11.3	12.5	13.1	14.5	18.0	18.8	165.4
Mean monthly sunshine hours	60.6	73.1	112.0	147.3	175.9	164.9	160.0	150.7	137.0	116.2	61.4	43.9	1,403
Source: JMA

== Sister city ==
The town of Kamifurano has a sister city in Canada:

- Camrose, Alberta, Canada

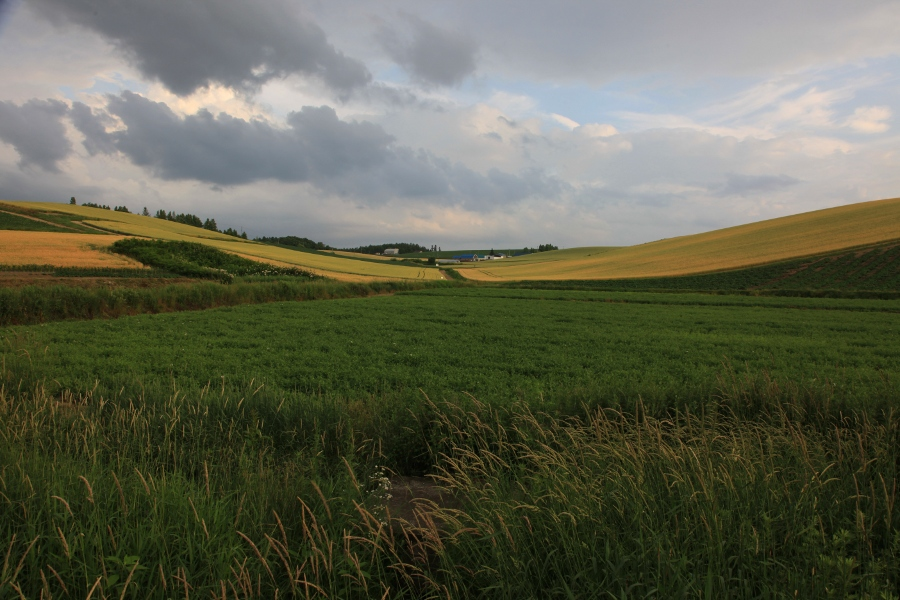
Kamifurano, Hokkaido, Japan
