= 2003 Tokachi earthquake =

Earthquake in Japan

2003 Tokachi earthquake 平成15年（2003年）十勝沖地震 (Heisei15-nen (2003-nen) Tokachi-Oki Jishin)
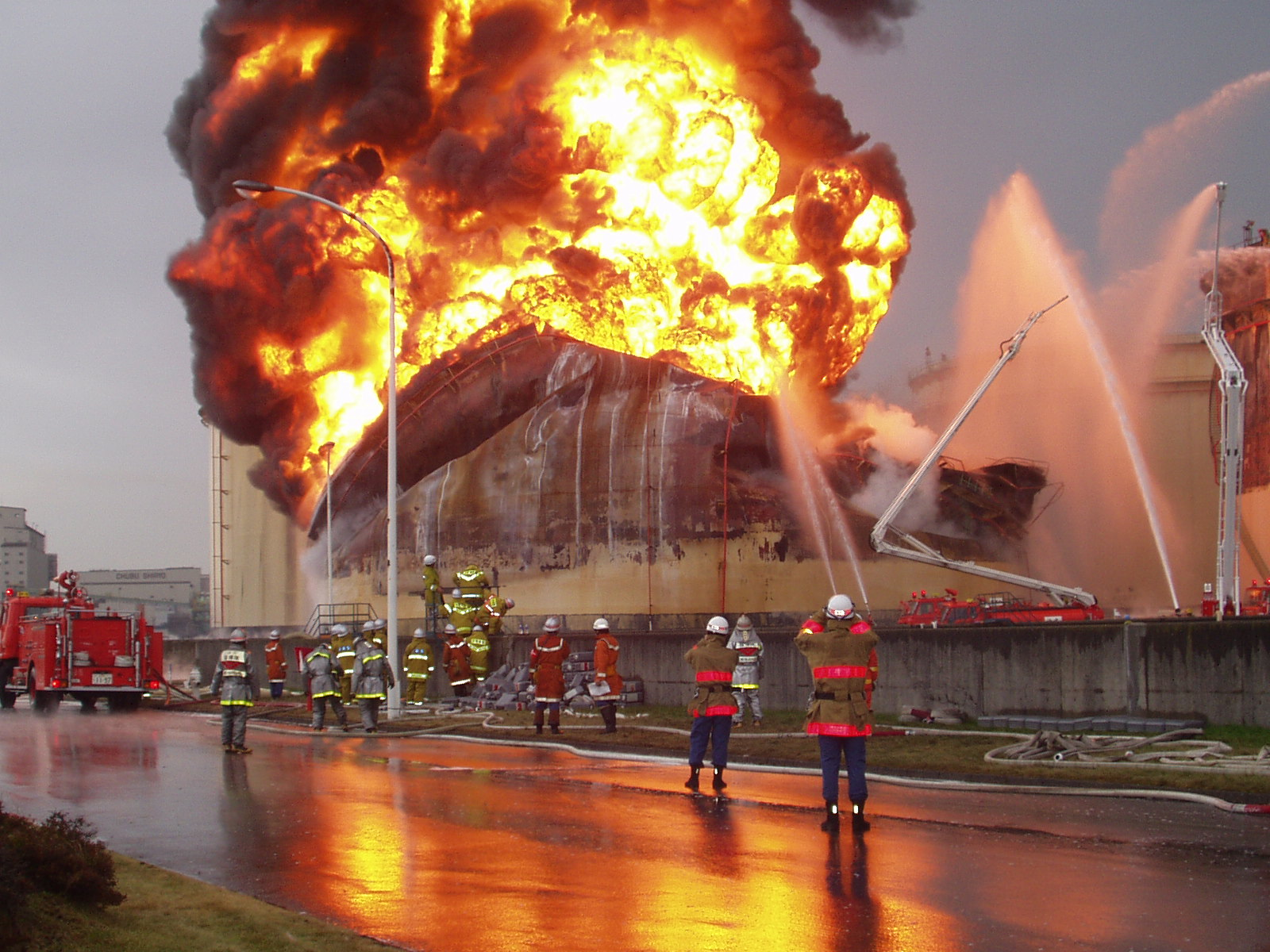
- Oil tank fire in Tomakomai
- UTC time: 2003-09-25 19:50:06
- ISC event: 7134409
- USGS-ANSS: ComCat
- Local date: 26 September 2003
- Local time: 04:50:06 JST (UTC+9)
- Magnitude: 8.0 M_{JMA} 8.3 M_{w}
- Depth: 27 km (17 mi)
- Epicenter: 41.78°N 143.86°E
- Type: Megathrust
- Areas affected: Hokkaido, Iwate and Aomori Prefectures, Japan
- Total damage: ¥213 billion (US$1.9 billion, equivalent to $3.32 billion in 2025)
- Max. intensity: JMA 6− (MMI IX)
- Peak acceleration: 1.11 g 1,091 Gal
- Tsunami: 4.4 m (14 ft)
- Landslides: Yes
- Aftershocks: 181 ≥M_{w}4.0; Strongest: M_{w} 7.4
- Casualties: 2 fatalities (1 indirect), 849 injuries, 1 missing

The 2003 Tokachi earthquake, known in Japanese as the 2003 Tokachi-Oki earthquake (平成15年十勝沖地震, Heisei jūgo-nen Tokachi-Oki jishin), occurred off the coast of Hokkaido, Japan on 26 September at 04:50 local time (19:50 UTC 25 September). At a focal depth of 27 km (17 mi), this great undersea earthquake measured 8.3 on the moment magnitude scale, making it the most powerful earthquake of 2003, as well as one of the most intense earthquakes to hit Japan since modern record-keeping began in 1900.

The Hokkaido earthquake caused extensive damage, damaging roads all around Hokkaidō, and triggered power outages and extensive landslides. Over 800 people were injured. The earthquake also caused a tsunami reaching 4.4 metres (14 ft) in height.

== Tectonic setting ==
The location and moment tensor solution of this earthquake are consistent with it being a result of thrust faulting between the North American plate and the subducting Pacific plate. In addition to experiencing large thrust earthquakes that originate on the interface between the plates, eastern Hokkaidō experiences great earthquakes that originate from the interior of the subducted Pacific plate.

The region experienced a catastrophic earthquake and tsunami with an estimated magnitude of 9.0 a few decades before 1667, a magnitude 8.2 event in 1952, a 1968 quake measuring 8.3 M_{w}, and one in 2008 measuring 7.1, all bearing the name Tokachi-Oki, and a 1973 event to the immediate north along the Kuril Trench plate boundary.

== Earthquake ==
With a magnitude of M_{JMA} 8.0, or M_{w} 8.3, the earthquake occurred as the result of shallow megathrust faulting on or near the plate interface between the overriding North American Plate and the subducting Pacific Plate. According to a finite fault model provided by the United States Geological Survey (USGS), earthquake rupture was recorded on an area of around 240 km (150 mi) × 210 km (130 mi) with a majority of the slip being concentrated on a 120 km (75 mi) × 115 km (71 mi) patch of the torn subduction interface and a maximum slip of 7.746 m (25.41 ft).

The earthquake had a maximum intensity of Shindo 6- on the Japan Meteorological Agency seismic intensity scale, which was observed in Kushiro, Tokachi and Hidaka Subprefectures. It also measured IX (Violent) on the Modified Mercalli intensity scale. By 31 December 2003, there were 181 aftershocks measuring M_{w} 4.0 or higher. The largest of them measured M_{w} 7.4 and struck at 21:08 UTC. At 09:06 UTC on 8 October, a M_{w} 6.7 aftershock occurred near Kushiro.

Locations with a seismic intensity of Shindo 5- and higher
Intensity	Locations
6−	Kushiro Town, Toyokoro, Makubetsu, Shikaoi, Urakawa, Shinhidaka, Niikappu, Akkeshi
5+	Kushiro, Betsukai, Teshikaga, Honbetsu, Ashoro, Sarabetsu, Hiroo, Obihiro, Atsuma
5−	Shinshinotsu, Kuriyama, Iwamizawa, Naganuma, Nanporo, Tomakomai, Memuro, Otofuke, Kamishihoro, Nakafurano, Kunneppu, Kitami, Kiyosato

== Damage and casualties ==
Despite the earthquake's great intensity, structural damage to the region was comparatively light; the epicenter was located nearly 100 kilometres (62 mi; 54 nmi) offshore, with most structures in its vicinity reported to be resistant to earthquake shaking. The majority of the destruction was confined to coastal areas, such as sea and fishing ports, mostly inflicted by subsequent tsunami waves. Although soil liquefaction was observed over a broad geological area, it occurred in localized areas almost exclusively limited to man-made embankments. The earthquake affected a total of 36 local rivers, including the major Abashiri and Ishikari Rivers. At least 849 people were injured; 847 in Hokkaido and one each in Aomori and Iwate Prefectures, with 69 of the injuries being serious. Monetary losses in Hokkaido amounted to at least ¥213 billion (2003 JPY), or $1.9 billion (2003 USD). One person died after being hit by a car while cleaning up earthquake damage. The tsunami swept away two fishermen in the Tokachi River near Toyokoro, killing one and leaving the other missing.

The earthquake and tsunami destroyed several oceanside home communities and damaged many others. Over 1,500 houses or buildings, most of them in Kushiro city, suffered considerable damage, with of a total of 141 reported to be partially or completely destroyed. Strong shaking affected many bridges in the region, some sustaining severe damage due to relative motion between spans in excess of design standards. The center of the Rekifune Bridge, located in Taiki, Hiroo, was reported to have sunk about 0.12 m (0.39 ft) at the joint section following significant ground deformation. Some local schools were also damaged, ranging from shattered windows to severed expansion joints and columns. Two town halls in Kushiro and Taiku suffered partial collapses.

At Kushiro Airport, the tremor caused the control tower ceiling to collapse, prompting officials to halt control work for several days. Small cracks were reported in the gates of the Takami Dam, though no threat of dam failure existed.

Several sea ports in the area sustained moderate damage, such as cracks and collapsing walls, due to lateral ground spreading caused by liquefaction. Some 123 coastal fishing ports and facilities in eastern Hokkaido reported significant damage, with an additional 25 ports damaged in Iwate. At least three major ports were affected by the disaster; Kushiro's port sustained sever damage to one of its piers as a result of ground displacement and sand boils. Tsunami waves stranded several small boats onshore; various ship containers and oil tanks along coastlines sustained damage. The earthquake left marine oil spills in its wake, though the conditions were quickly normalized.

== See also ==
- List of earthquakes in 2003
- List of earthquakes in Japan
