= Tokachi Province =

Former province of Japan

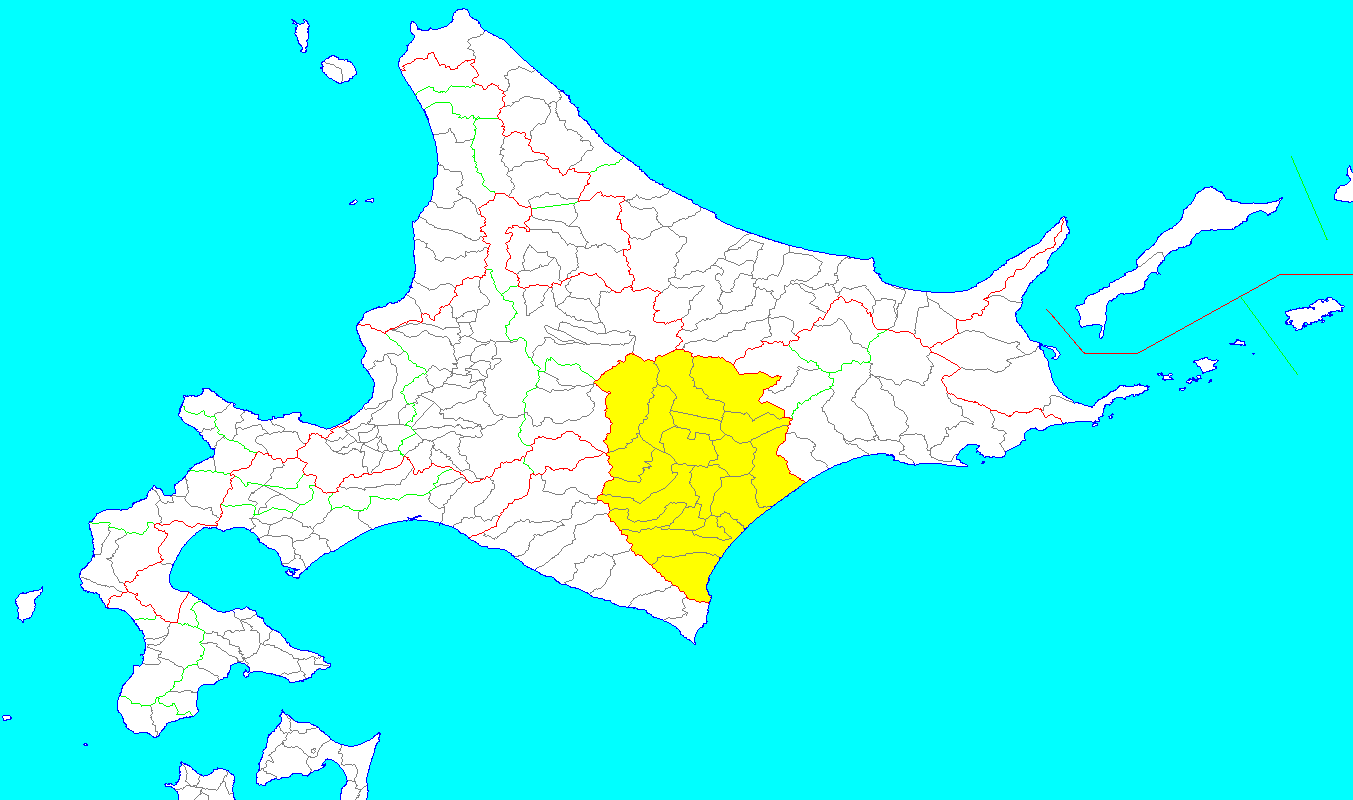
Location of Tokachi Province c. 1869.

Tokachi Province (十勝国, Tokachi no Kuni; Japanese pronunciation: [tó̞.kä̀.c̟͡ɕì (nò̞ kɯ̈̀.ɲ̟ì)]) was a short-lived province in Hokkaido. It corresponded to modern-day Tokachi Subprefecture.

== History ==
In 1820, the explorer Takeshiro Matsuura (松浦 武四郎, Matsuura Takeshirō) proposed Tokachi as the name of the province. The province was named after the Tokachi River, which in turn was derived from the Ainu language word "tokapci".

Although the exact origins of "tokapci" were unknown, Hidezo Yamada, an Ainu language researcher, proposed these origins:

- tokap-usi ("breast, somewhere")
- toka-o-pci ("swamp, around a place, either")

After 1869, the northern Japanese island was known as Hokkaido; and regional administrative subdivisions were identified, including Tokachi Province.

- August 15, 1869 Tokachi Province established with 7 districts
- 1872 Census finds a population of 1,464
- 1882 Provinces dissolved in Hokkaido

== Districts ==
- Hiroo (広尾郡)
- Tōbui (当縁郡) - dissolved April 1, 1906 when 3 villages merged into Moyori Village (now Hiroo Town) in Hirō District and two villages merged with Ōtsu Village in Tokachi District
- Kamikawa (上川郡)
- Nakagawa (中川郡)
- Katō (河東郡)
- Kasai (河西郡)
- Tokachi (十勝郡)
