= Chūrui, Hokkaido =

Chūrui 忠類村
- Village
- Flag Emblem

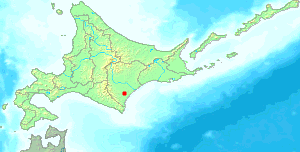
- Location of Chūrui in Hokkaido (Tokachi Subprefecture)

- Location in Japan
- Coordinates: 42°34′N 143°18′E
- Country: Japan
- Region: Hokkaido
- Prefecture: Hokkaido (Tokachi Subprefecture)
- Now part of Makubetsu: February 6, 2006

Area
  - Total: 137.54 km^{2} (53.10 sq mi)

Population (2004)
  - Total: 1,802
  - Density: 13.1/km^{2} (34/sq mi)
- Time zone: UTC+09:00 (JST)
- City hall address: 439-1 Churui, Churui-mura, Hiroo-gun, Hokkaido; 089-1795
- Website: web.archive.org/web/20060206170823/http://www.vill.churui.hokkaido.jp/
- Symbols
- Flower: Phlox subulata
- Tree: Betula platyphylla

Chūrui (忠類村, Chūrui-mura) was a village located in Hiroo District, Tokachi Subprefecture, Hokkaido, Japan.

As of 2004, the village had an estimated population of 1,802 and a density of 13.10 persons per km^{2}. The total area was 137.54 km^{2}.

On February 6, 2006, Chūrui was merged into the expanded town of Makubetsu (in Nakagawa (Tokachi) District).
