= Tokachi River =

River in Hokkaidō, Japan

Tokachi River Tokachi-gawa, Tokapci
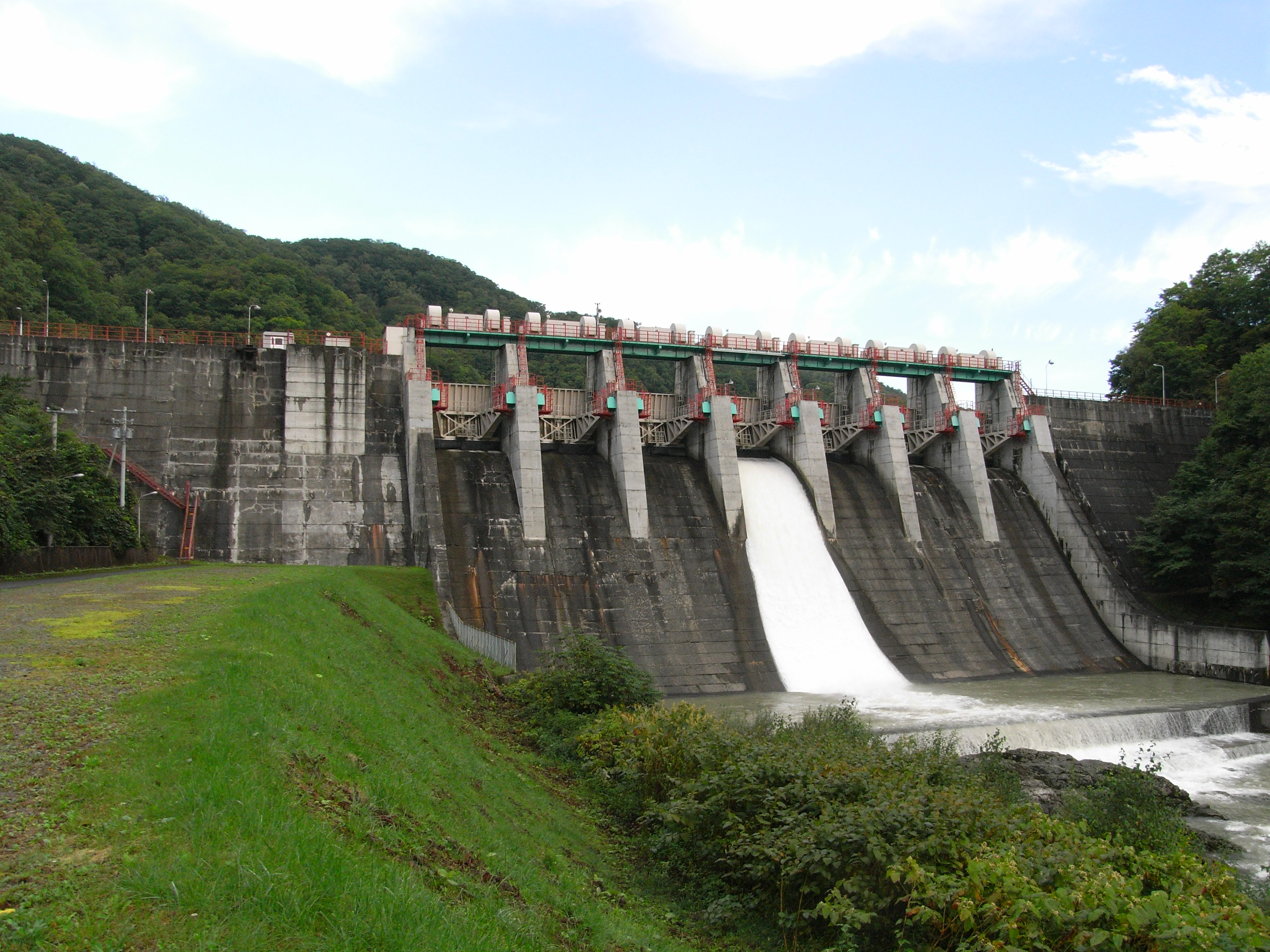
- Iwamatsu Dam in Shimizu (September 2007)

- Location within Japan
- Native name: 十勝川 (Japanese); トカㇷ゚チ (Ainu)

Location
- Country: Japan
- State: Hokkaidō
- Region: Tokachi
- District: Kamikawa, Nakagawa
- Municipalities: Shintoku, Toyokoro

Physical characteristics
- Source
  - location: Shintoku, Hokkaidō, Japan
- Mouth: Pacific Ocean
  - location: Toyokoro, Hokkaidō, Japan
  - coordinates: 42.6950°N 143.6661°E
  - elevation: 0 m (0 ft)
- Length: 156 km (97 mi)
- Basin size: 9,010 km^{2} (3,480 mi^{2})
- Discharge
  - average: 71 m^{3}/s (2,500 cu ft/s)

Basin features
- Population: 340,000

Tokachi River (十勝川, Tokachi-gawa) is a Class A river in Hokkaidō, Japan.

== Etymology ==
In 1820, the explorer Takeshiro Matsuura (松浦 武四郎) proposed "Tokachi" as the name of the surrounding Tokachi Province, with each character corresponding to a Japanese homophone. The province was named after this river, which in turn was derived from the Ainu language word "tokapci" (トカㇷ゚チ).

Although the exact origins of "tokapci" were unknown, Hidezo Yamada, an Ainu language researcher, proposed these origins:

- tokap-usi ("breast, somewhere")
- toka-o-pci ("swamp, around a place, either")
