= Shihoro, Hokkaido =

Town in Japan

Shihoro 士幌町 Toyokoro-chō
- Town
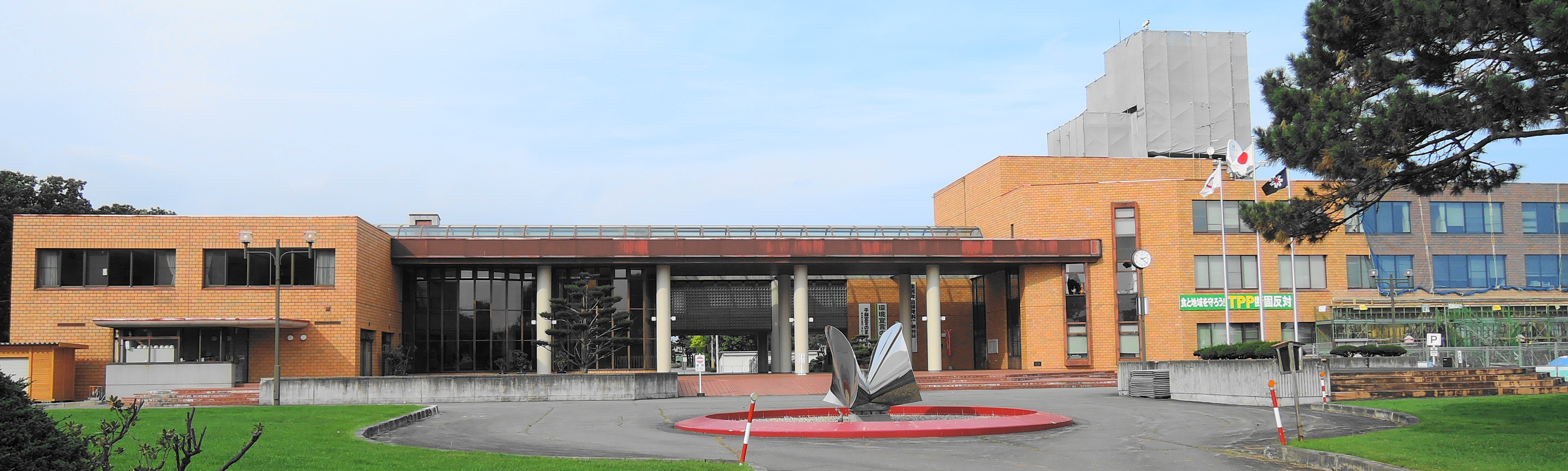
- Shihoro town hall

- Flag Emblem

- Location of Shihoro in Hokkaido (Tokachi Subprefecture)
- Interactive map of Shihoro
- Coordinates: 43°10′05″N 143°14′28″E
- Country: Japan
- Region: Hokkaido
- Prefecture: Hokkaido (Tokachi Subprefecture)
- District: Katō

Area
  - Total: 259.19 km^{2} (100.07 sq mi)

Population (December 31, 2025)
  - Total: 5,611
  - Density: 21.65/km^{2} (56.07/sq mi)
- Time zone: UTC+09:00 (JST)
- City hall address: 22 Shihoro, Shihoro-cho, Kato-gun, Hokkaido 080-1292
- Climate: Dfb
- Website: www.shihoro.jp
- Symbols
- Bird: Common cuckoo
- Flower: Lily of the valley
- Tree: Daimyo Oak

Shihoro (士幌町, Shihoro-chō) is a town located in Tokachi Subprefecture, Hokkaidō, Japan. As of 31 December 2025, the town had an estimated population of 5,611 in 2834 households, and a population density of 22 people per km^{2}. The total area of the town is 259.19 km^{2} (100.07 sq mi).

== Geography ==
Shihoro is located in southeastern Hokkaido the northern Tokachi Sunprefecture. Half of the town's area is flat, sloping gently southward. The Otofuke River flows through the center of the town, as well as the Wop River and Pankechin River. The eastern side of the town is the hilly region of Sakurayama, and across the Ibe River basin, the Oshitai plateau forms the border with Honbetsu.

=== Neighboring municipalities ===
- Shikaoi
- Otofuke
- Kamishihoro
- Ikeda
- Honbetsu

=== Climate ===
According to the Köppen climate classification, Shihoro has a humid continental climate. It has large temperature differences, including large annual and daily temperature ranges. The town is located at an altitude of 146 to 420 meters, with an average annual temperature of 7 °C. In winter, the southwesterly seasonal winds are strong, causing temperatures to drop below -20 °C.

=== Demographics ===
Per Japanese census data, the population of Shioro has declined in recent decades.

Historical population
| Year | Pop. | ±% |
|---|---|---|
| 1970 | 7,567 | — |
| 1980 | 6,979 | −7.8% |
| 1990 | 7,149 | +2.4% |
| 2000 | 6,839 | −4.3% |
| 2010 | 6,418 | −6.2% |
| 2020 | 5,848 | −8.9% |

== History ==
The development of Tokachi Province began to get underway in 1886, but settlement in present-day Shihoro did not begin until 1898. That year, a group of 43 households from tGifu Prefecture began developing the land. In 1921 parts of Otofuke Village separated to become Kawakami Village, which was renamed Shihoro Village in 1926. Shihoro was raised to town status in 1962.

== Government ==
Shihoro has a mayor-council form of government with a directly elected mayor and a unicameral town council of 12 members. Shihoro, as part of Tokachi Subprefecture, contributes four members to the Hokkaidō Prefectural Assembly. In terms of national politics, the town is part of the Hokkaidō 11th district of the lower house of the Diet of Japan.

== Economy ==
The town's main industry is agriculture, with large-scale facilities such as a starch factory, a wheat drying and storage facility, and a potato processing facility, all affiliated with the Shihoro Town Agricultural Cooperative (JA Shihoro Town). The town also has facilities related to the production and processing of agricultural and livestock products.

== Education ==
Shihoro has three public elementary schools and one public middle school operated by the town. The town has one public high school operated by the Hokkaido Board of Education.

== Transportation ==
=== Railways ===
Shihoro has not had any passenger railway services since the discontinuation of the Shihoro Line in 1987. The nearest train station is Obihiro Station on the JR Hokkaido Nemuro Main Line.

=== Highways ===
- National Route 241
- National Route 274

== Local attractions ==
- Shihoro Town Traditional Agriculture Preservation and Transmission Museum, Mino House
- Shihoro Onsen Plaza Midorikaze (Roadside Station Shihoro Onsen)
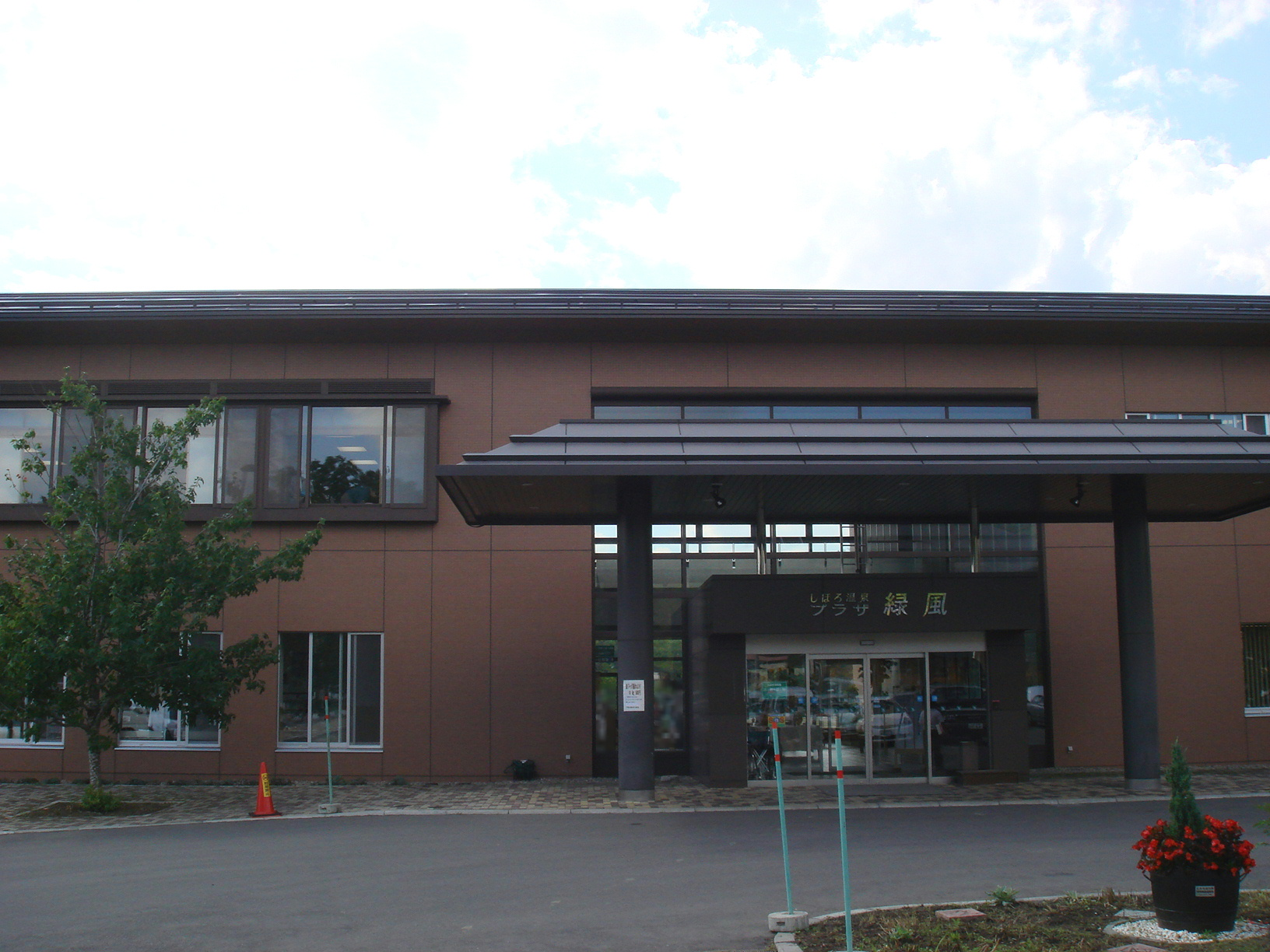
Shihoro onsen

Tokachi River and Toyokoro Bridge

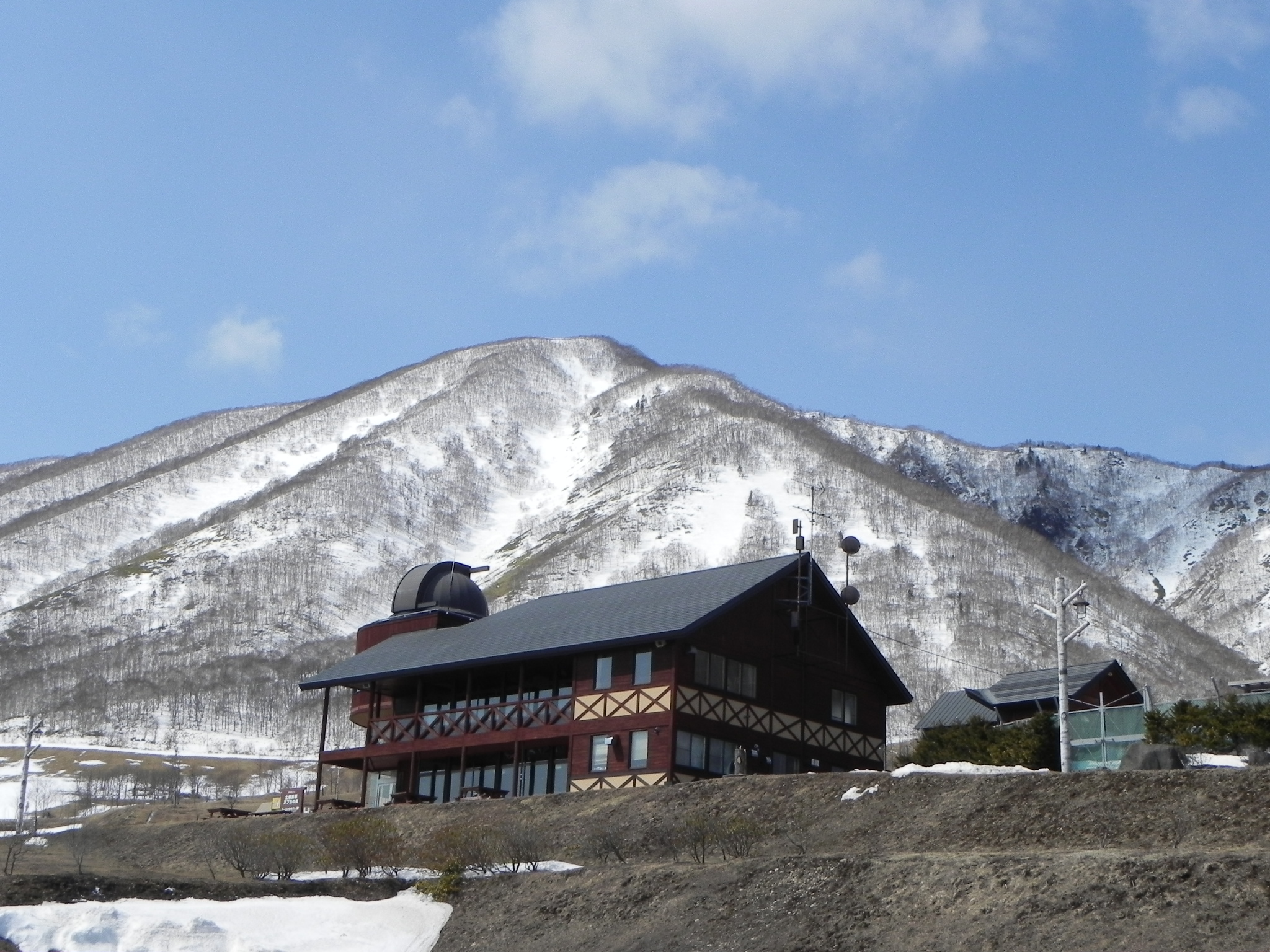
Higashinupukaushinupuri seen from the ESE.

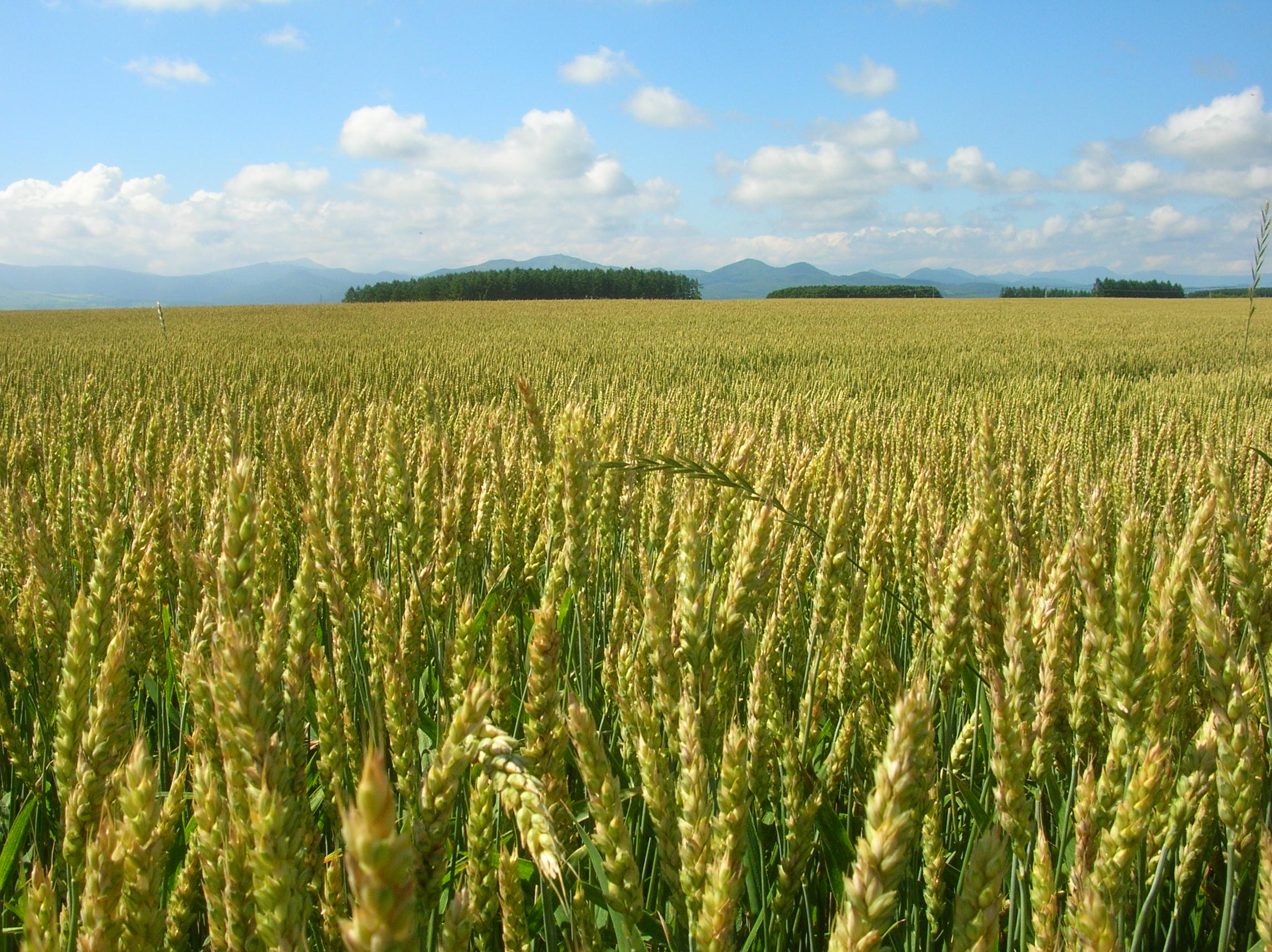
Wheat fields in Shihoro

== Mascot ==
Daichi-kun, the town's mascot

Shihoro's mascot is Daichi-kun (大地くん). He is a joyful and dynamic blue alien. He is shaped like a "shi" (士). His gooey body contains a pink heart representing love, a yellow star for hope and dreams, a white mountain symbolizing the Nupukaushi-nupuri mountain range and a green tree representing nature. Enthusiasm and harmonious development is his goal. In other versions, he is depicted as a young human boy.
