= Makubetsu, Hokkaido =

Town in Japan

Makubetsu 幕別町 Makubetsu-chō
- Town
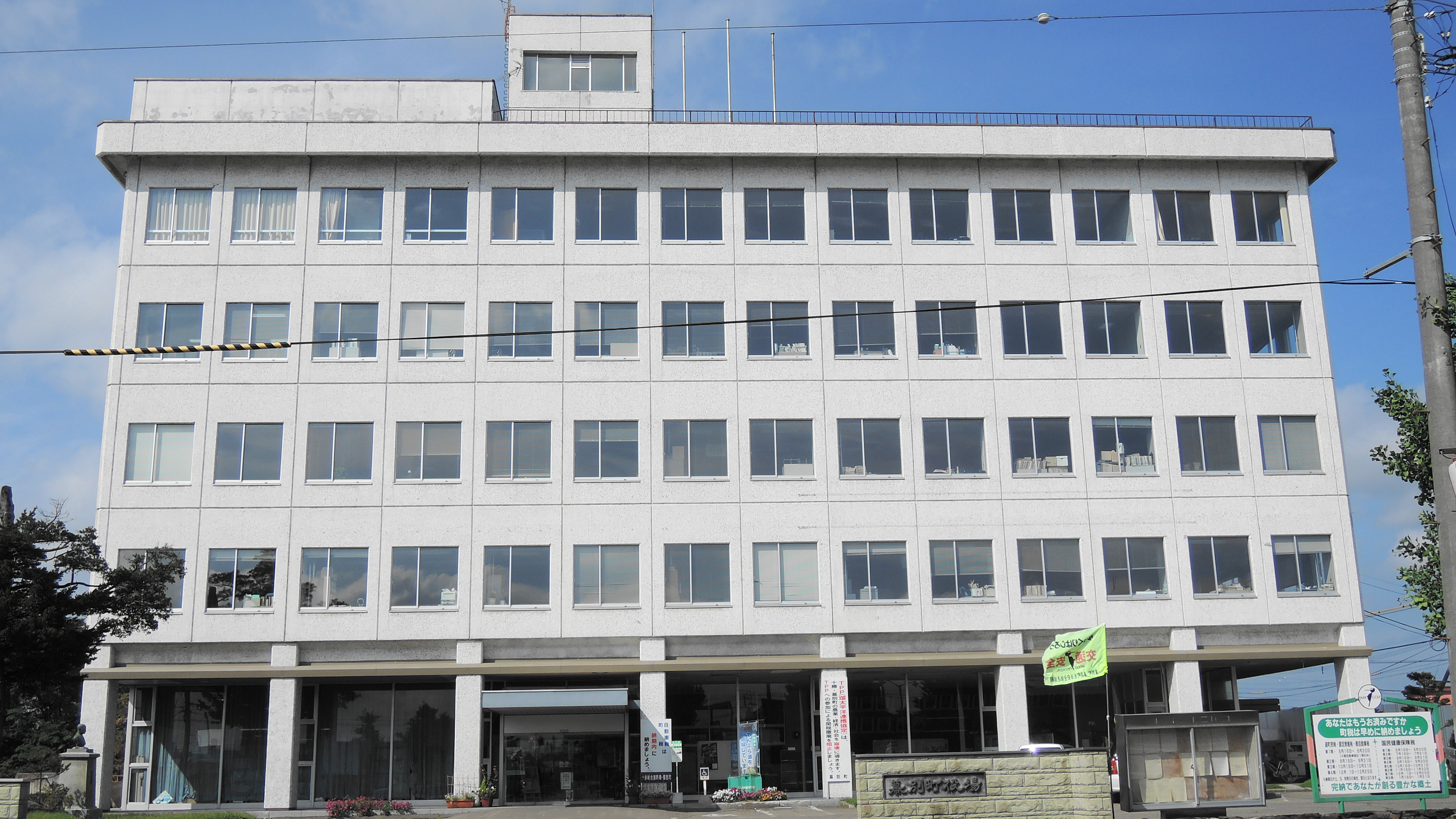
- Makubetsu Town Hall

- Flag Emblem

- Location of Makubetsu in Hokkaido (Tokachi Subprefecture)
- Interactive map of Makubetsu
- Coordinates: 42°54′31″N 143°21′22″E
- Country: Japan
- Region: Hokkaido
- Prefecture: Hokkaido (Tokachi Subprefecture)
- District: Nakagawa (Tokachi)

Area
  - Total: 477.64 km^{2} (184.42 sq mi)

Population (November 30, 2025)
  - Total: 25,032
  - Density: 52.408/km^{2} (135.74/sq mi)
- Time zone: UTC+09:00 (JST)
- City hall address: 130-1 Honmachi, Makubetsu-cho, Nakagawa-gun, Hokkaido 089-0692
- Climate: Dfb
- Website: www.town.makubetsu.lg.jp
- Symbols
- Bird: Whooper swan
- Flower: Creeping Phlox
- Tree: Daimyo Oak

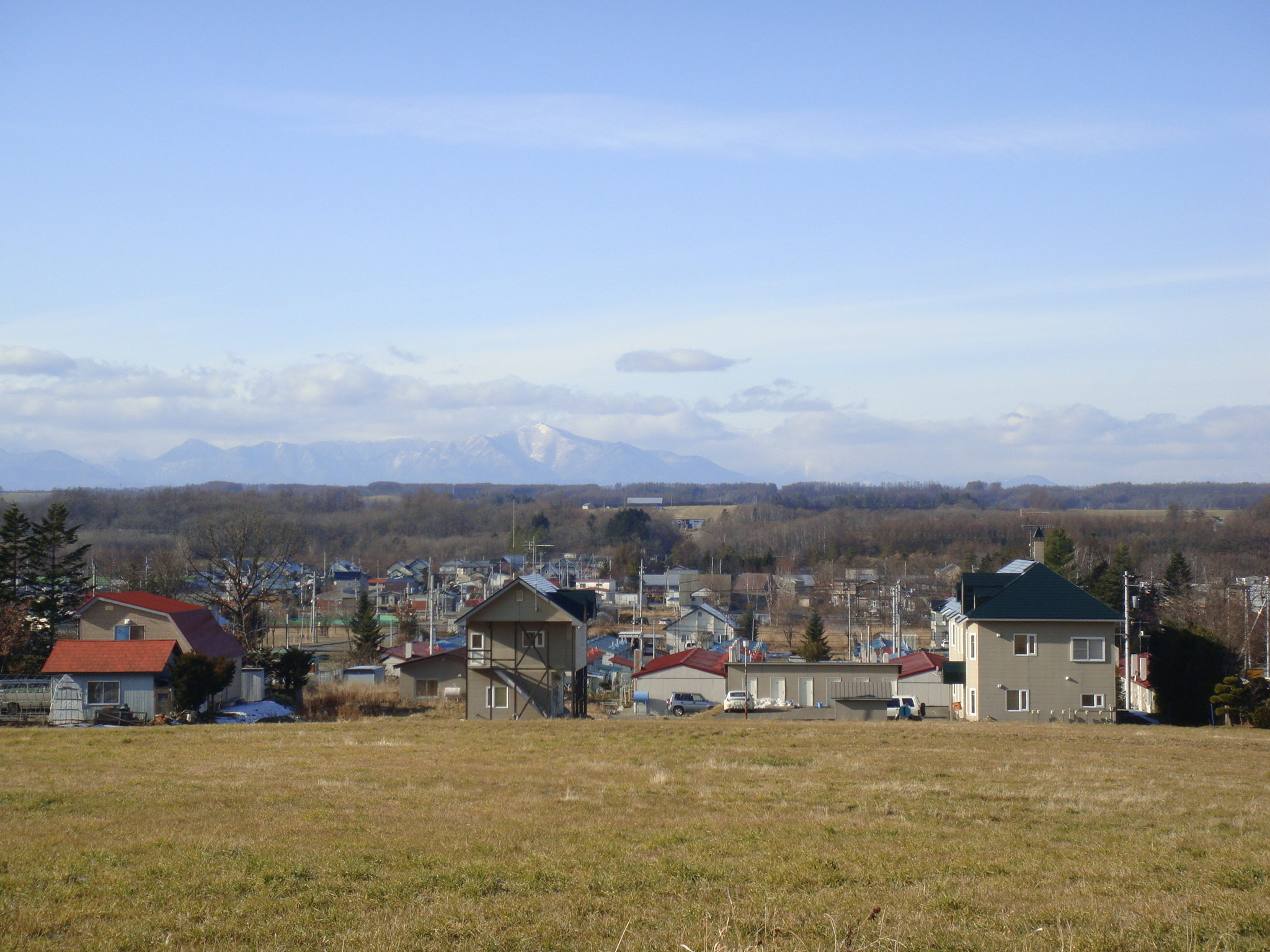
Panorama of Churui region in Makubetsu

Makubetsu (幕別町, Makubetsu-chō) is a town located in Tokachi Subprefecture, Hokkaidō, Japan. As of 30 November 2025, the town had an estimated population of 25,032 in 12688 households, and a population density of 52 people per km^{2}. The total area of the town is 477.64 km^{2} (184.42 sq mi).

== Geography ==
Makubetsu is located in southeastern Hokkaido in the central part of the Tokachi Subprefecture, and borders Obihiro City to the west. The Tokachi Plain, where Makubetsu is located, is primarily composed of hills and plateaus. The Tokachi River flows north of the Makubetsu region, the Satsunai River flows west, and the Sarabetsu River and Tobetsu River flow through the center, as well as various small rivers. The Churui region forms a hilly area with a stepped elevation toward the plateaus of Taiki and Sarabetsu, although some areas also have gently undulating terrain. The eastern, southern, and northern sides are surrounded by mountains 200 to 300 meters in elevation that are rich in forest resources. The Toen River flows northwest to southeast through the center of the region.

=== Neighboring municipalities ===
  - Toyokoro
  - Obihiro
  - Ikeda
  - Otofuke
  - Sarabetsu
  - Taiki

=== Demographics ===
Makubetsu Town is made up of three districts: Makubetsu, Satsunai, and Churui. Per Japanese census data, the population of Makubetsu has remained stable. The Makubetsu and Churui districts have experience a rapid decline in population compared to the Satsunai district, which has been developed as a commuter town for Obihiro City.

Historical population
Year	Pop.	±%
1970	20,994	—
1980	22,390	+6.6%
1990	23,408	+4.5%
2000	26,080	+11.4%
2010	26,542	+1.8%
2020	25,766	−2.9%

== Climate ==
According to the Köppen climate classification, Makubetsu has a humid continental climate. It has large temperature differences, including large annual and daily temperature ranges. It receives a lot of snow, and is designated as a heavy snow area. In winter, temperatures below -30 °C are not uncommon, making it extremely cold.

Climate data for Nukanai, Makubetsu (elevation 70 m, 1991–2020 normals, extremes 1978–present)
Month	Jan	Feb	Mar	Apr	May	Jun	Jul	Aug	Sep	Oct	Nov	Dec	Year
Record high °C (°F)	7.8 (46.0)	13.9 (57.0)	17.1 (62.8)	31.7 (89.1)	38.4 (101.1)	35.5 (95.9)	37.0 (98.6)	36.7 (98.1)	33.3 (91.9)	28.5 (83.3)	21.8 (71.2)	14.0 (57.2)	38.4 (101.1)
Mean daily maximum °C (°F)	−1.8 (28.8)	−0.7 (30.7)	4.0 (39.2)	11.5 (52.7)	17.4 (63.3)	20.5 (68.9)	23.7 (74.7)	24.8 (76.6)	21.6 (70.9)	15.9 (60.6)	8.4 (47.1)	0.6 (33.1)	12.1 (53.8)
Daily mean °C (°F)	−9.9 (14.2)	−8.4 (16.9)	−2.2 (28.0)	4.7 (40.5)	10.4 (50.7)	14.2 (57.6)	18.0 (64.4)	19.2 (66.6)	15.6 (60.1)	8.7 (47.7)	1.7 (35.1)	−6.5 (20.3)	5.4 (41.7)
Mean daily minimum °C (°F)	−18.4 (−1.1)	−17.3 (0.9)	−9.1 (15.6)	−1.8 (28.8)	3.7 (38.7)	8.8 (47.8)	13.5 (56.3)	14.7 (58.5)	10.3 (50.5)	2.3 (36.1)	−4.3 (24.3)	−13.8 (7.2)	−0.9 (30.4)
Record low °C (°F)	−31.8 (−25.2)	−31.7 (−25.1)	−27.2 (−17.0)	−15.7 (3.7)	−5.7 (21.7)	−1.2 (29.8)	2.8 (37.0)	4.2 (39.6)	−1.2 (29.8)	−6.8 (19.8)	−17.5 (0.5)	−26.7 (−16.1)	−31.8 (−25.2)
Average precipitation mm (inches)	50.6 (1.99)	35.3 (1.39)	50.8 (2.00)	68.1 (2.68)	92.4 (3.64)	86.5 (3.41)	111.5 (4.39)	140.1 (5.52)	161.3 (6.35)	103.2 (4.06)	63.4 (2.50)	60.8 (2.39)	1,035.3 (40.76)
Average precipitation days (≥ 1.0 mm)	5.4	4.7	6.4	8.6	8.5	8.6	9.7	10.5	10.6	8.0	7.1	6.7	95.6
Mean monthly sunshine hours	171.3	170.5	205.8	188.1	182.4	147.6	121.0	125.5	141.0	169.9	164.3	160.7	1,947.4
Source: Japan Meteorological Agency (1991–2020 normals, extremes 1978–present)

== History ==
In 1906 under Hokkaido's second-class town and village system the hamlet of Makubetsu became Makubetsu Village. It was raised to a first class village in 1919 and a town in 1946. On February 6, 2006, the village of Chūrui (from Hiroo District) was merged into Makubetsu.

== Government ==
Makubetsu has a mayor-council form of government with a directly elected mayor and a unicameral town council of 19 members. Makubetsu, as part of Tokachi Subprefecture, contributes four members to the Hokkaidō Assembly. In terms of national politics, the town is part of the Hokkaidō 11th district of the lower house of the Diet of Japan.

== Economy ==
The local economy remains centered on agriculture, with field crops and vegetable production in the Satsunai and Minami-Makubetsu districts, and dairy farming in the Churui district. In terms of crops, the area and production of Chinese yam are among the highest in the country. In terms of dairy and livestock farming, small- to medium-sized dairy farms and Japanese Black cattle breeding operations are combined with crops in the Makubetsu district, while the Churui district has a wide variety of operations, including large-scale dairy farming.

Industrial parks in the Satsunai district include the Riverside Makubetsu Industrial Park and the Satsunai East Industrial Park.

== Education ==
Makubetsu has nine public elementary schools and five public middle schools operated by the town. The town has one public high school and one special education school for the handicapped operated by the Hokkaido Board of Education.

== Transportation ==
=== Railways ===
JR Hokkaido - Nemuro Main Line

■ Satsunai - Makubetsu

=== Highways ===
- Obihiro-Hiroo Expressway
- National Route 38
- National Route 236
- National Route 242
- National Route 336

== Local attractions ==
- Makubetsu is the birthplace of park golf, and as of 2006, has no less than ten individual courses.
- Chūrui Naumann Elephant Museum
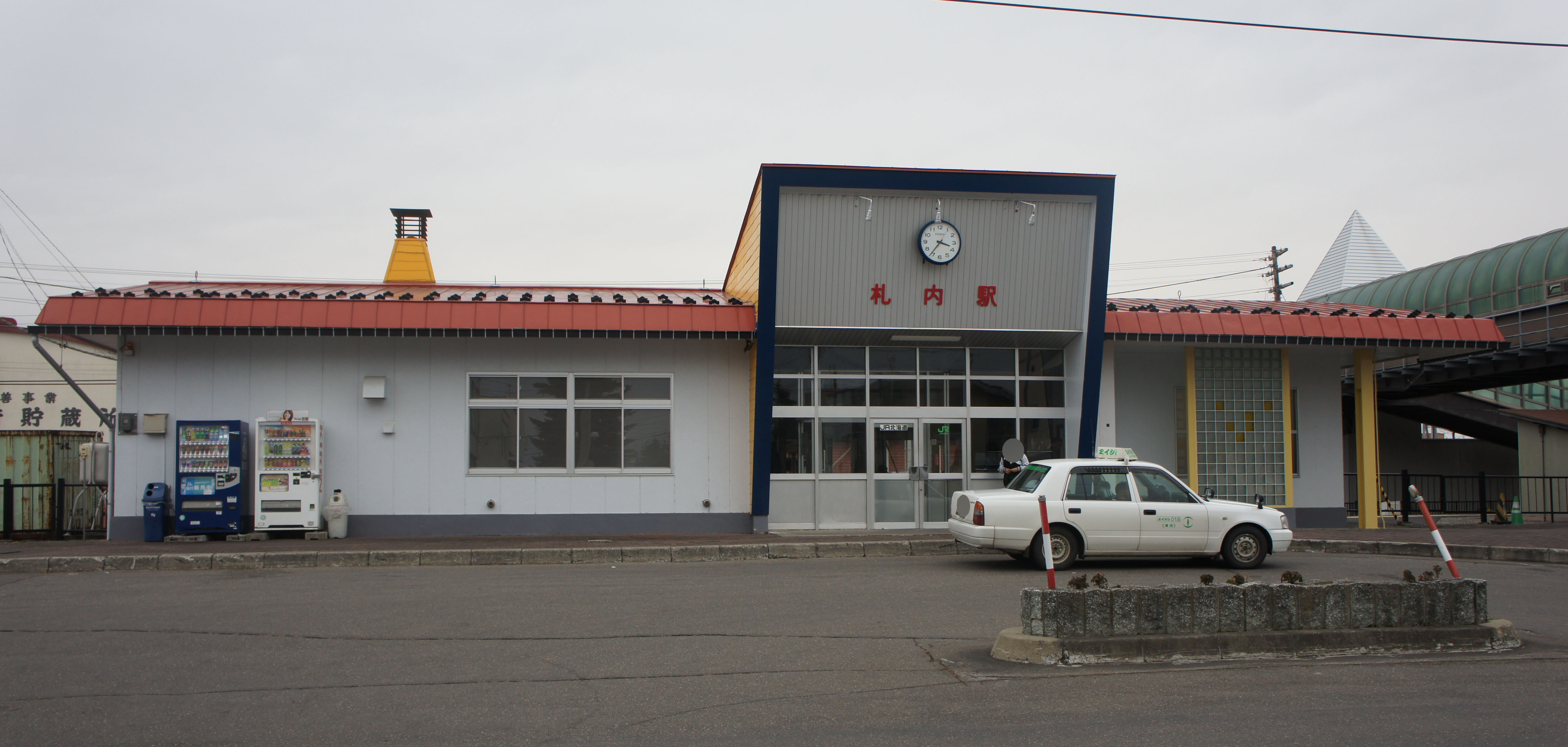
Makubetsu railway station

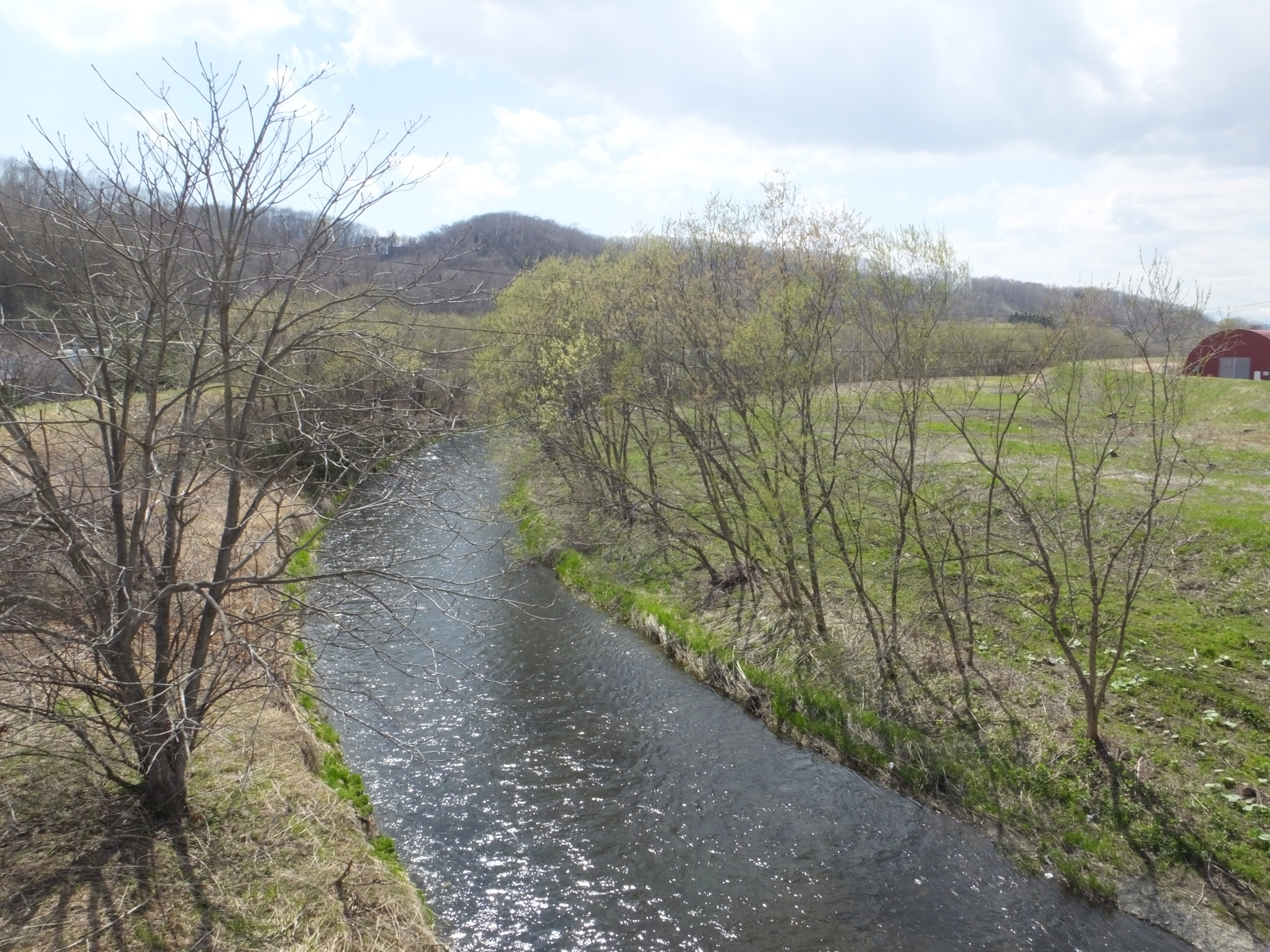
Tobetsu River

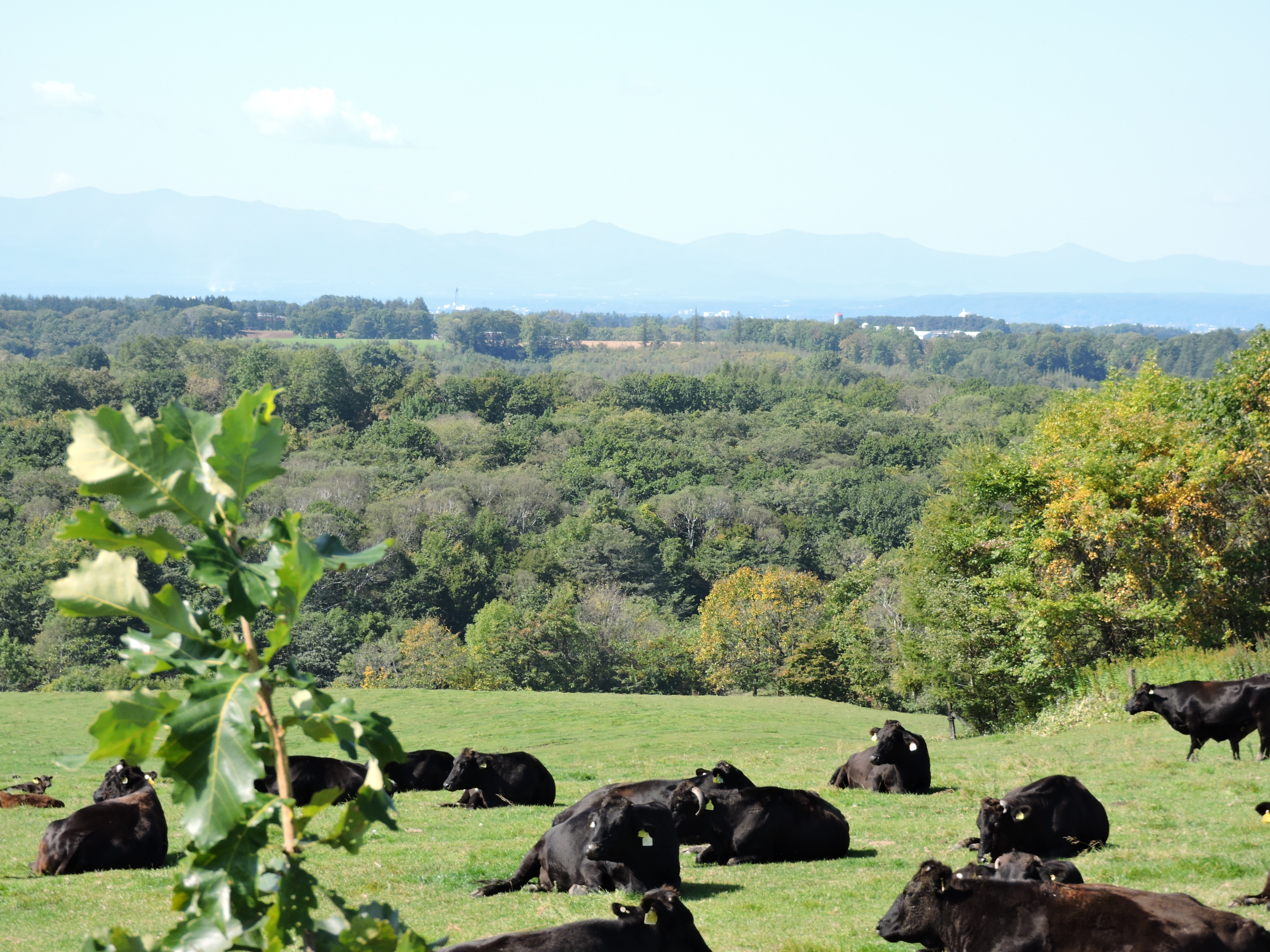
Panorama of Makubetsu

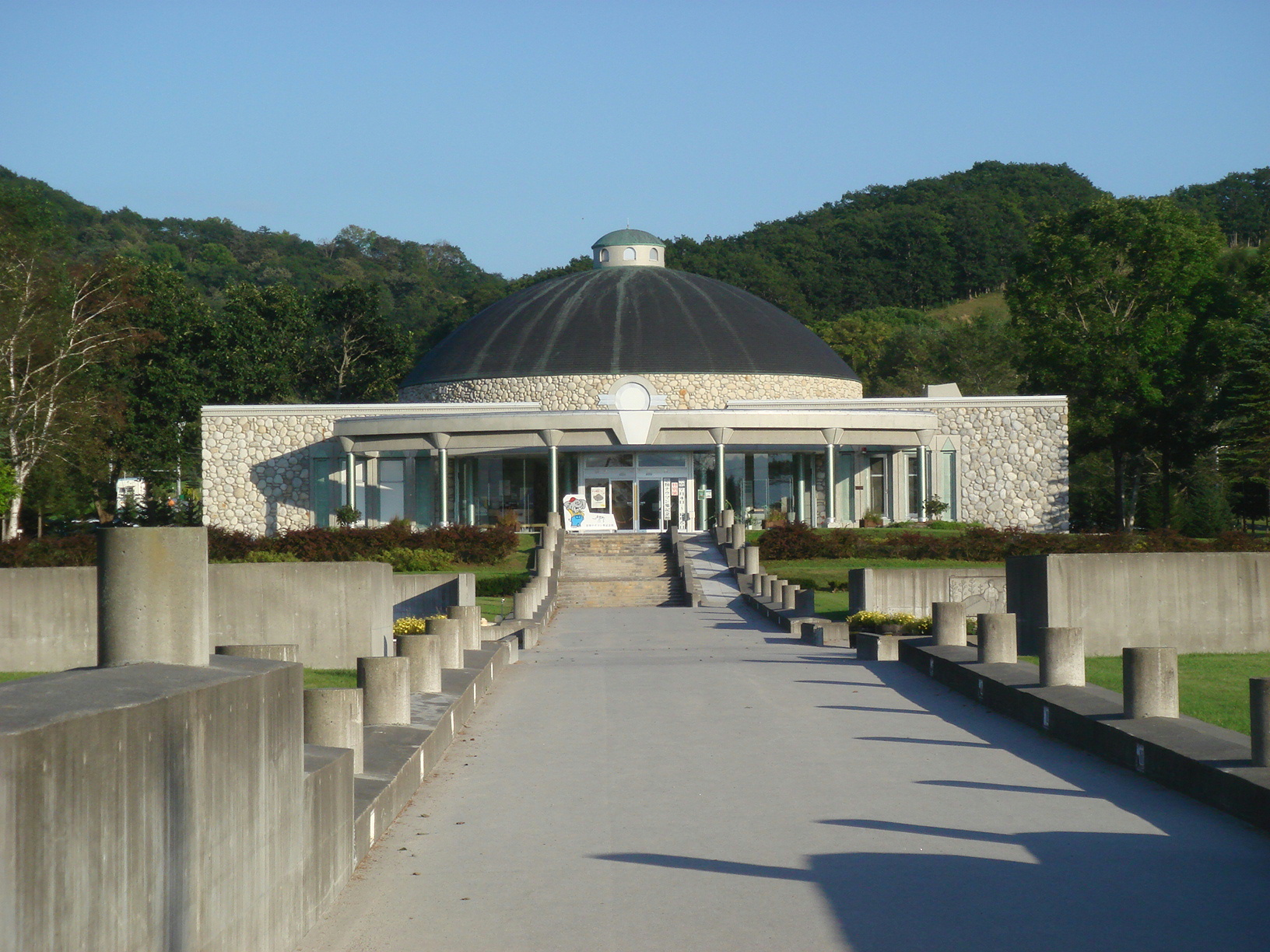
Chūrui Naumann Elephant Museum

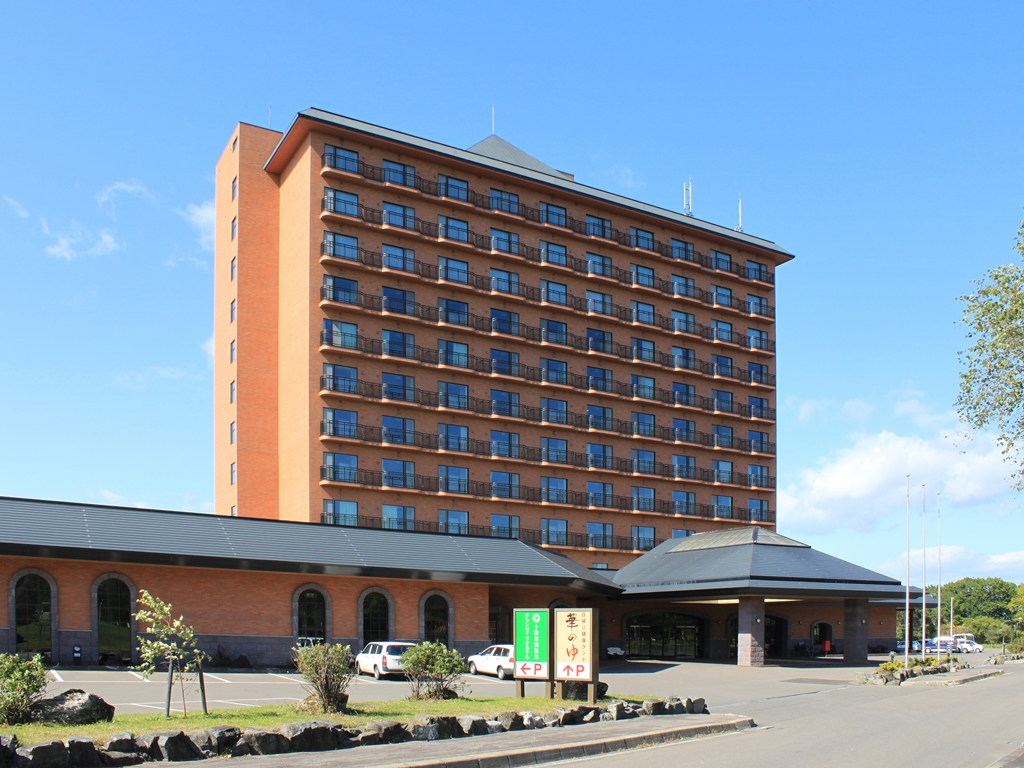
Makubetsu onsen

== Notable people from Makubetsu ==
- Umeko Ando, Ainu singer and mukkuri player
- Hiromu Arakawa, the author of Fullmetal Alchemist and Silver Spoon
- Chisato Fukushima, track and field sprint athlete
- Miho Takagi, speed skater
- Nana Takagi, speed skater
- Fumio Ueda, former mayor of Sapporo
- Kohei Yamamoto, mountain biker

== Mascots ==
Pao-kun and Kumagera-kun, the town's mascots

Makubetsu's mascot is Pao-kun (パオくん) is a blue elephant. He is one of the descendants of Naumann's elephants. His charm points are his trunks, his big ears, his long tusks and his lovely eyes. He is assisted by Kumagera-kun (クマゲラくん) who is a woodpecker from the local park golf course. They both love to play park golfing and eat lily blubs. Pao-kun is unveiled in 1997 while Kumagera-kun is unveiled in 2006.
