= Ashoro District, Hokkaido =

District in Hokkaido, Japan

Coordinates: 43°24′56″N 143°37′06″E

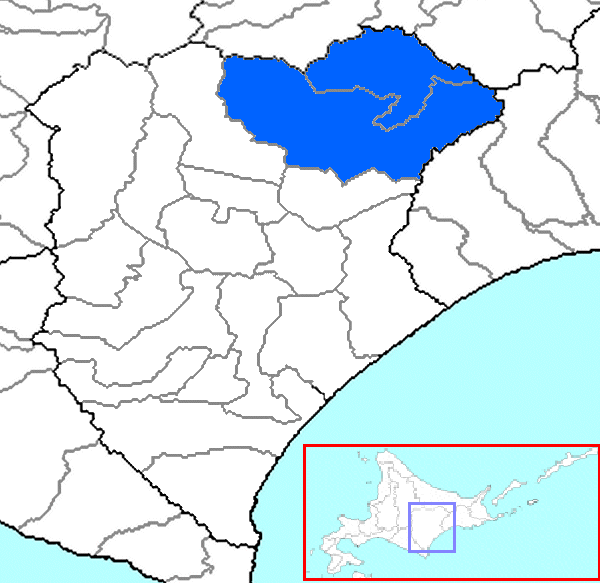
The area of Ashoro District in Tokachi Subprefecture.

Ashoro (足寄郡, Ashoro-gun) is a district located in Tokachi Subprefecture, Hokkaido, Japan.

As of 2004, the district has an estimated population of 11,424 and a density of 5.66 persons per km^{2}. The total area is 2,016.90 km^{2}.

== Towns ==
- Ashoro
- Rikubetsu

== History ==
- 1869 Provinces and districts established in Hokkaido, Ashoro District created in Kushiro Province
- October 20, 1948 Ashoro District split off from Kushirokuni Subprefecture (now Kushiro Subprefecture) and incorporated into Tokachi Subprefecture
- April 1, 1951 Part of Nishiashoro town, Nakagawa District incorporated into Rikubetsu town
- April 1, 1955 Nishiashoro town, (from Nakagawa District) merged with Ashoro village to elevate Ashoro town, (from Ashoro District)
