= Shikaoi, Hokkaido =

Town in Japan

Shikaoi 鹿追町 Shikaoi-chō
- Town
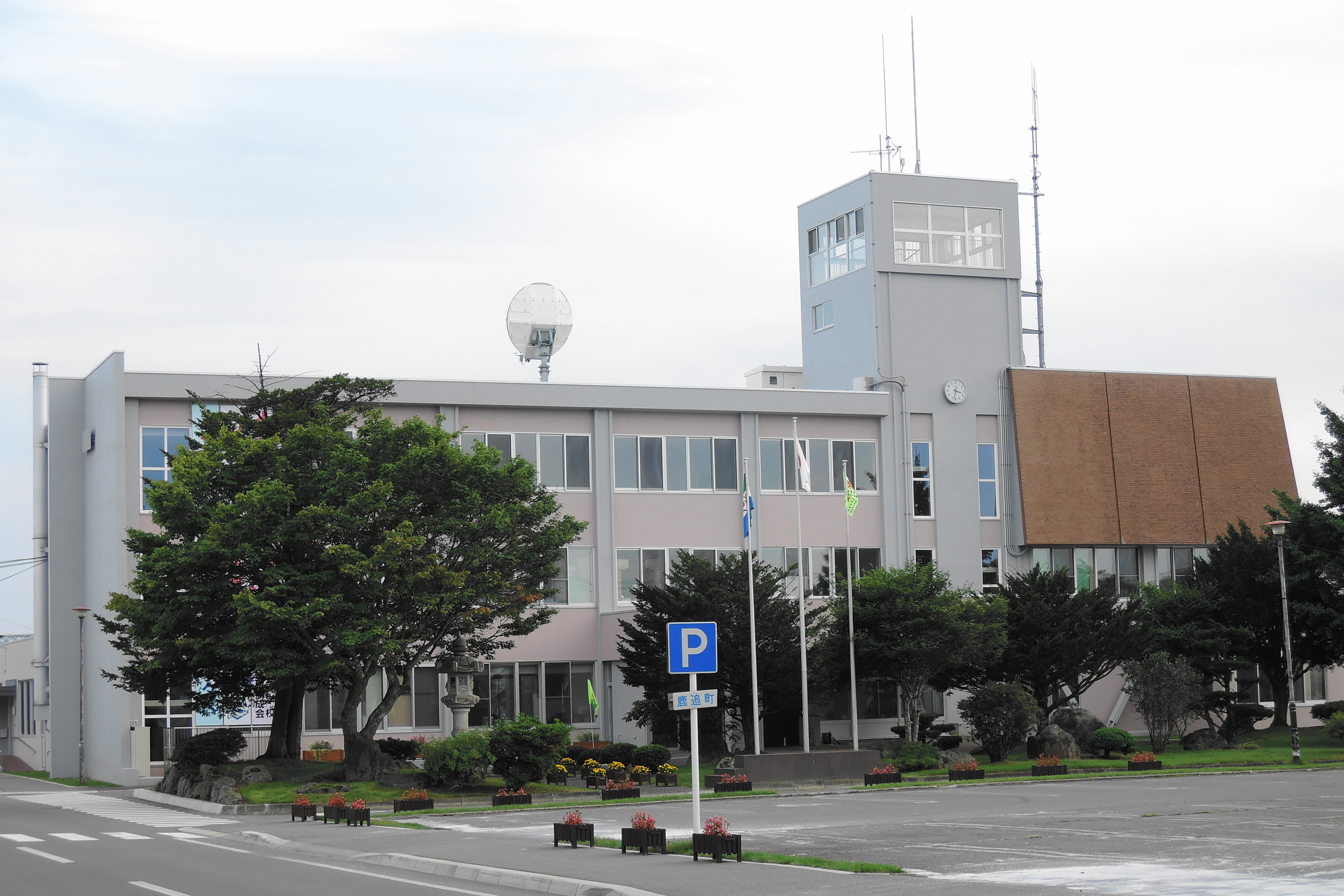
- Shikaoi town hall

- Flag Emblem

- Location of Shikaoi in Hokkaido (Tokachi Subprefecture)
- Interactive map of Shikaoi
- Coordinates: 43°06′15″N 142°59′21″E
- Country: Japan
- Region: Hokkaido
- Prefecture: Hokkaido (Tokachi Subprefecture)
- District: Katō

Area
  - Total: 402.88 km^{2} (155.55 sq mi)

Population (December 31, 2025)
  - Total: 4,828
  - Density: 11.98/km^{2} (31.04/sq mi)
- Time zone: UTC+09:00 (JST)
- City hall address: 1-15-1 Higashimachi, Shikaoi-cho, Kato-gun, Hokkaido 081-0292
- Climate: Dfb
- Website: www.town.shikaoi.lg.jp
- Symbols
- Bird: Common cuckoo
- Flower: Rhododendron
- Tree: Maple

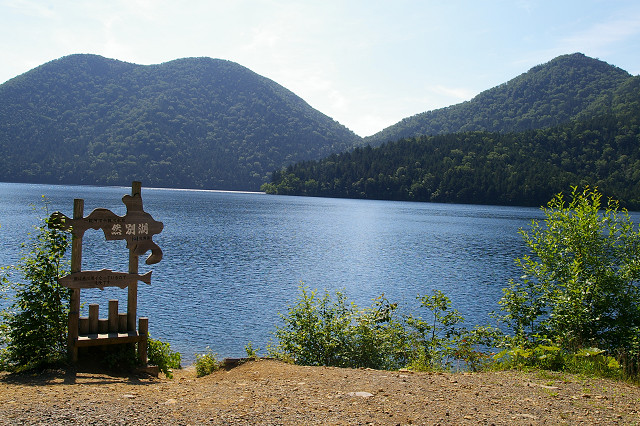
Lake Shikaribetsu

Shikaoi (鹿追町, Shikaoi-chō) is a town located in Tokachi Subprefecture, Hokkaidō, Japan. As of 31 December 2025, the town had an estimated population of 4,828 in 2455 households, and a population density of 12 people per km^{2}. The total area of the town is 402.88 km^{2} (155.55 sq mi).

== Geography ==
Shikaoi is located in southeastern Hokkaido in the northern part of the Tokachi Subprefecture. It is in the northwestern part of the Tokachi Plain. The northern edge of the town is within Daisetsuzan National Park, and is home to a forest of high mountains such as Mount Upepesanke (1848 meters), Mount Pisikachinai, and Mount Nupkaushinupuri to the east and west. However, heading south, the alluvial fan created by the Shikaribetsu River, which has its source in Lake Shikaribetsu, spreads out.The entire town has been designated as part of the Tokachi Shikaoi Geopark.

=== Neighboring municipalities ===
- Shihoro
- Kamishihoro
- Otofuke
- Shintoku
- Shimizu
- Memuro

=== Climate ===
According to the Köppen climate classification, Shikaoi has a humid continental climate. It has large temperature differences, including large annual and daily temperature ranges. It receives a lot of snow, and is designated as a heavy snow area. In winter, temperatures below -20 °C are not uncommon, making it extremely cold.

Climate data for 鹿追（1991年 - 2020年）
Month	Jan	Feb	Mar	Apr	May	Jun	Jul	Aug	Sep	Oct	Nov	Dec	Year
Record high °C (°F)	7.4 (45.3)	13.1 (55.6)	16.9 (62.4)	27.8 (82.0)	36.5 (97.7)	36.0 (96.8)	37.4 (99.3)	35.7 (96.3)	34.0 (93.2)	28.5 (83.3)	20.2 (68.4)	14.2 (57.6)	37.4 (99.3)
Mean daily maximum °C (°F)	−2.5 (27.5)	−1.7 (28.9)	2.9 (37.2)	10.4 (50.7)	16.9 (62.4)	20.4 (68.7)	23.3 (73.9)	24.3 (75.7)	20.8 (69.4)	14.5 (58.1)	6.9 (44.4)	−0.2 (31.6)	11.3 (52.3)
Daily mean °C (°F)	−6.7 (19.9)	−6.2 (20.8)	−1.6 (29.1)	5.0 (41.0)	11.0 (51.8)	14.8 (58.6)	18.5 (65.3)	19.6 (67.3)	15.9 (60.6)	9.5 (49.1)	2.8 (37.0)	−3.9 (25.0)	6.6 (43.9)
Mean daily minimum °C (°F)	−11.9 (10.6)	−11.8 (10.8)	−6.5 (20.3)	−0.2 (31.6)	5.5 (41.9)	10.1 (50.2)	14.5 (58.1)	15.6 (60.1)	11.5 (52.7)	4.7 (40.5)	−1.3 (29.7)	−8.2 (17.2)	1.8 (35.2)
Record low °C (°F)	−26.3 (−15.3)	−25.2 (−13.4)	−21.3 (−6.3)	−12.4 (9.7)	−4.3 (24.3)	0.0 (32.0)	4.6 (40.3)	6.2 (43.2)	1.4 (34.5)	−3.9 (25.0)	−12.4 (9.7)	−19.0 (−2.2)	−26.3 (−15.3)
Average precipitation mm (inches)	34.1 (1.34)	27.7 (1.09)	41.5 (1.63)	54.4 (2.14)	83.9 (3.30)	81.9 (3.22)	128.7 (5.07)	168.4 (6.63)	141.7 (5.58)	88.2 (3.47)	56.5 (2.22)	45.9 (1.81)	952.8 (37.51)
Average precipitation days (≥ 1.0 mm)	6.7	6.3	8.0	9.0	9.8	10.3	12.4	12.7	11.7	9.9	9.2	8.2	114.2
Mean monthly sunshine hours	153.0	152.5	189.4	181.4	176.2	133.8	113.7	119.8	139.9	160.6	140.2	133.6	1,794.3

=== Demographics ===
Per Japanese census data, the population of Shikaoi is relatively stable. The population increased after the war due to the settlement of evacuees and the establishment of a Japanese Ground Self-Defense Force base, reaching 10,778 in 1961. After that, the population steadily declined as farmers left farming due to cold weather damage and the development of other industries, but since 1965, it has plateaued thanks to measures such as the promotion of dairy farming and cold-climate crops, and the development of agricultural infrastructure

Historical population
Year	Pop.	±%
1970	7,883	—
1980	6,744	−14.4%
1990	6,307	−6.5%
2000	5,910	−6.3%
2010	5,702	−3.5%
2020	5,266	−7.6%

== History ==
During the early Meiji period, the first Japanese trading post was established in 1879 for trade with the Ainu people. The first Japanese colonist was in 1902, and the population gradually increased as colonization groups from various places in Honshu homesteaded the area. Otofuke village was established in 1906 under the Hokkaido Second-Class Town and Village System. Shikaoi separated from Otofuke in 1921, becoming Shikaoi Village. It was raised to town status in 1959.

== Government ==
Shikaoi has a mayor-council form of government with a directly elected mayor and a unicameral town council of 11 members. Shikaoi, as part of Tokachi Subprefecture, contributes four members to the Hokkaidō Prefectural Assembly. In terms of national politics, the town is part of the Hokkaidō 11th district of the lower house of the Diet of Japan.

== Economy ==
The local economy is very much dominated by agriculture, with dairy farming and field crops predominate, but with some areas also engaged in mixed farming. The town's main crops are milk, sugar beets, potatoes, beans, wheat, and feed. In 2007, the Shikaoi Town Environmental Conservation Center, centered around a biogas plant, began operation to utilize biomass as a resource, with the aim of promoting renewable energy using local resources.

== Education ==
Shikaoi has five public elementary schools and four public middle schools operated by the town. The town has one public high school operated by the Hokkaido Board of Education.

== Transportation ==
=== Railways ===
Shikaoi has not had a passenger railway service since the closure of the Hokkaidō Takushoku Tetsudō in 1968. The nearest railway station is Shintoku Station on the JR Hokkaido Nemuro Main Line.

=== Highways ===
- National Route 274

== Local attractions ==
- Kanda Nissho Memorial Museum of Art
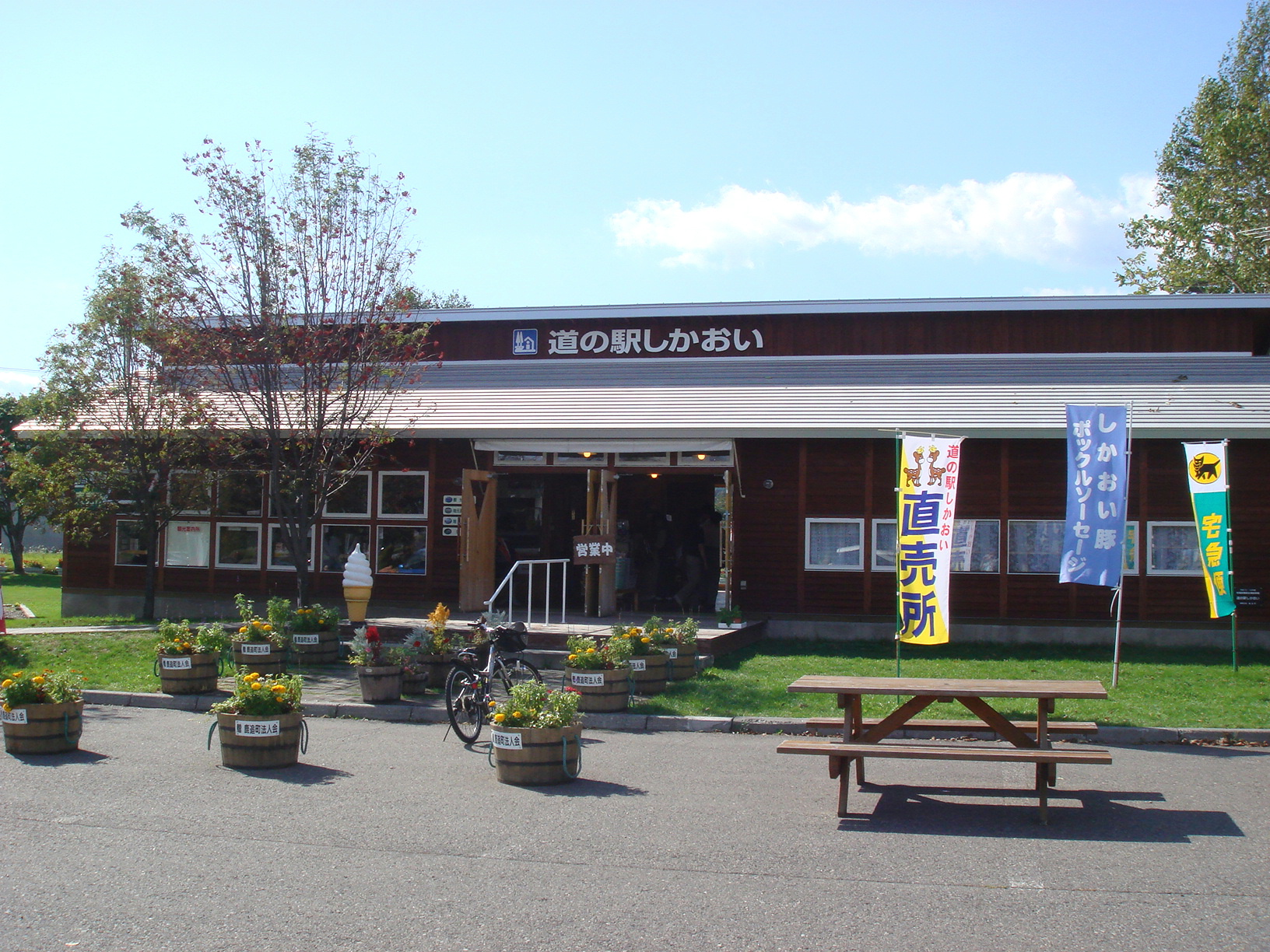
Shikaoi road station

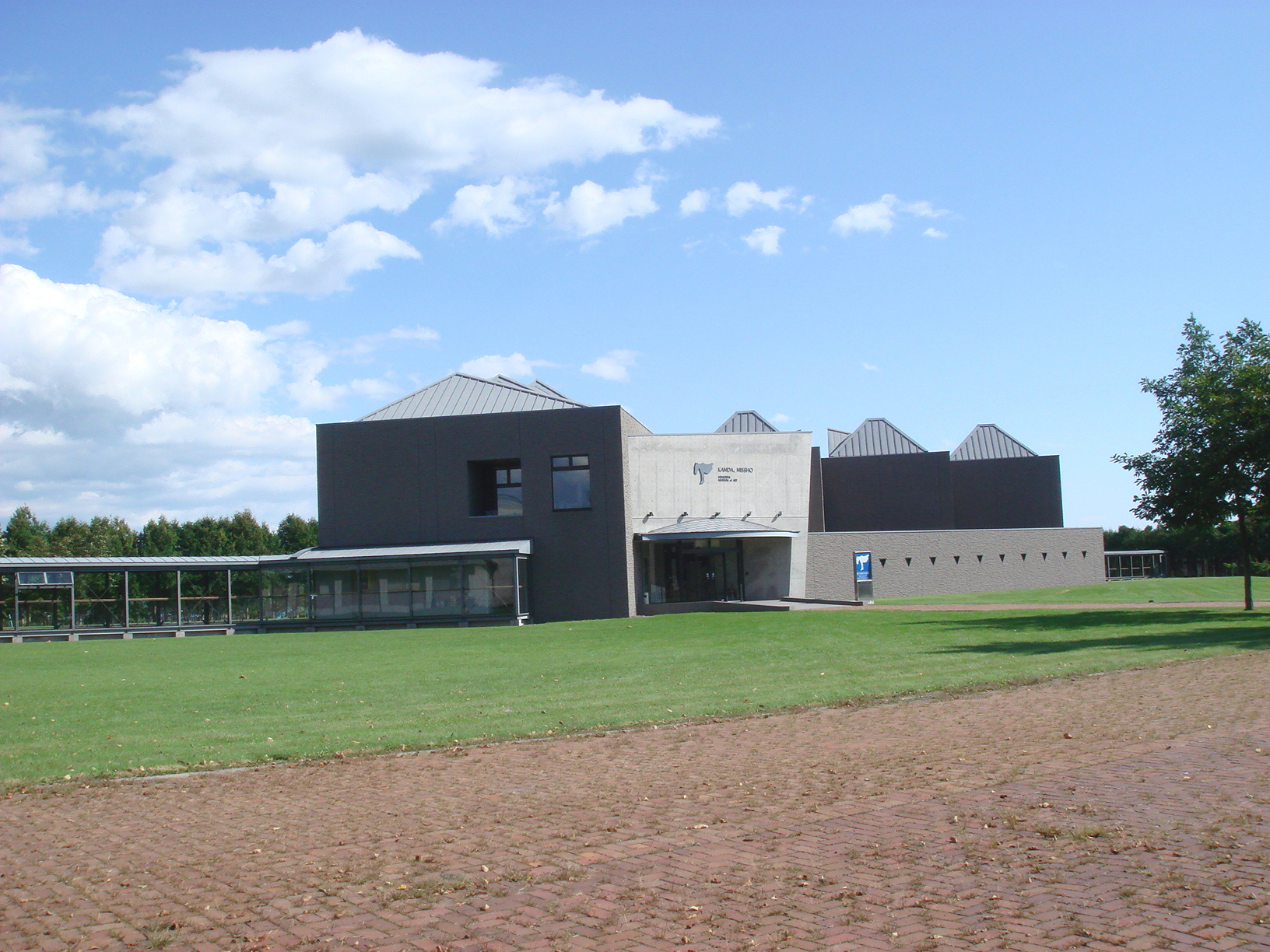
Kanda Nissho Memorial Museum of Art

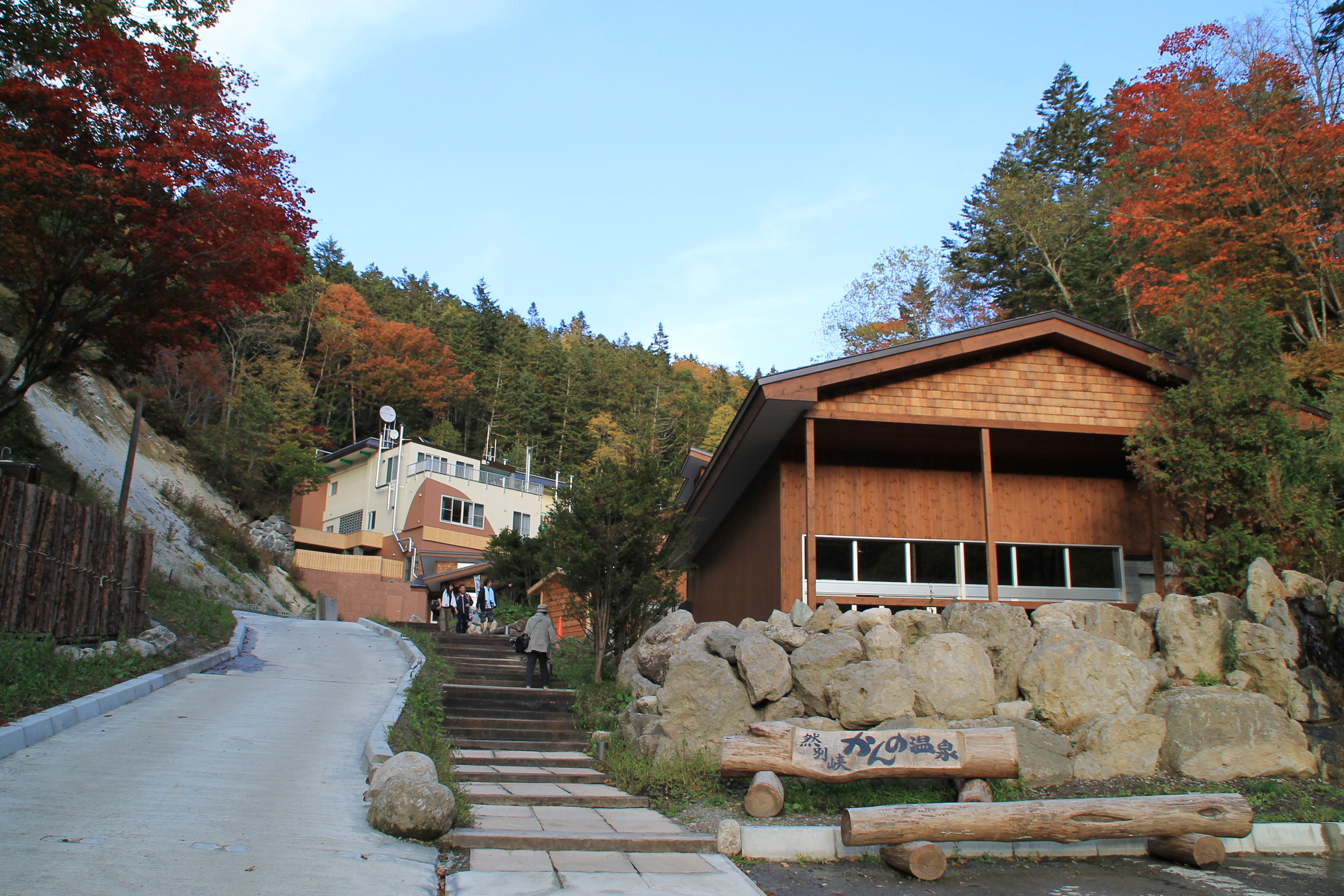
Shin-Kano Onsen

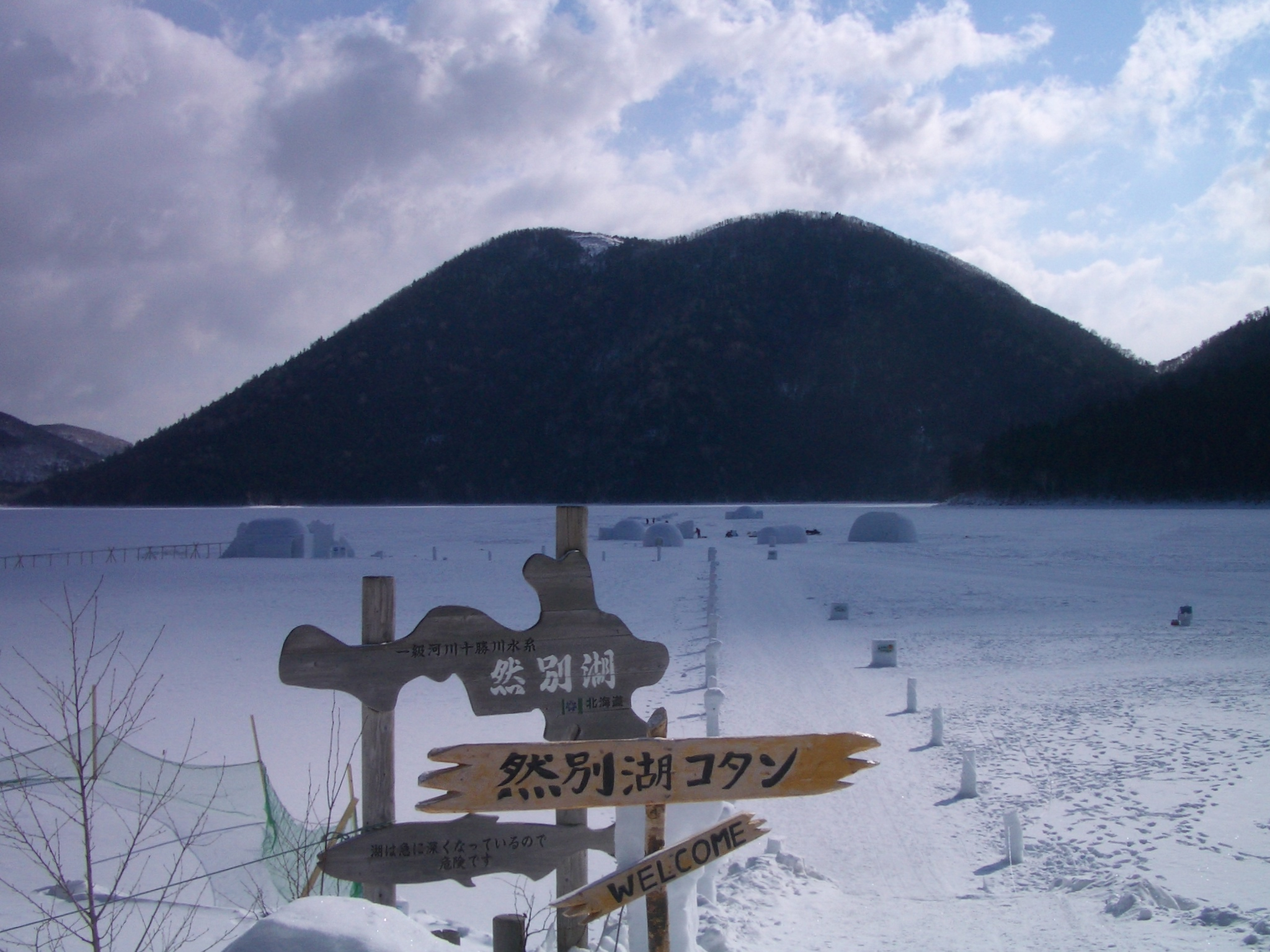
Lake Shikaribetsu in Winter

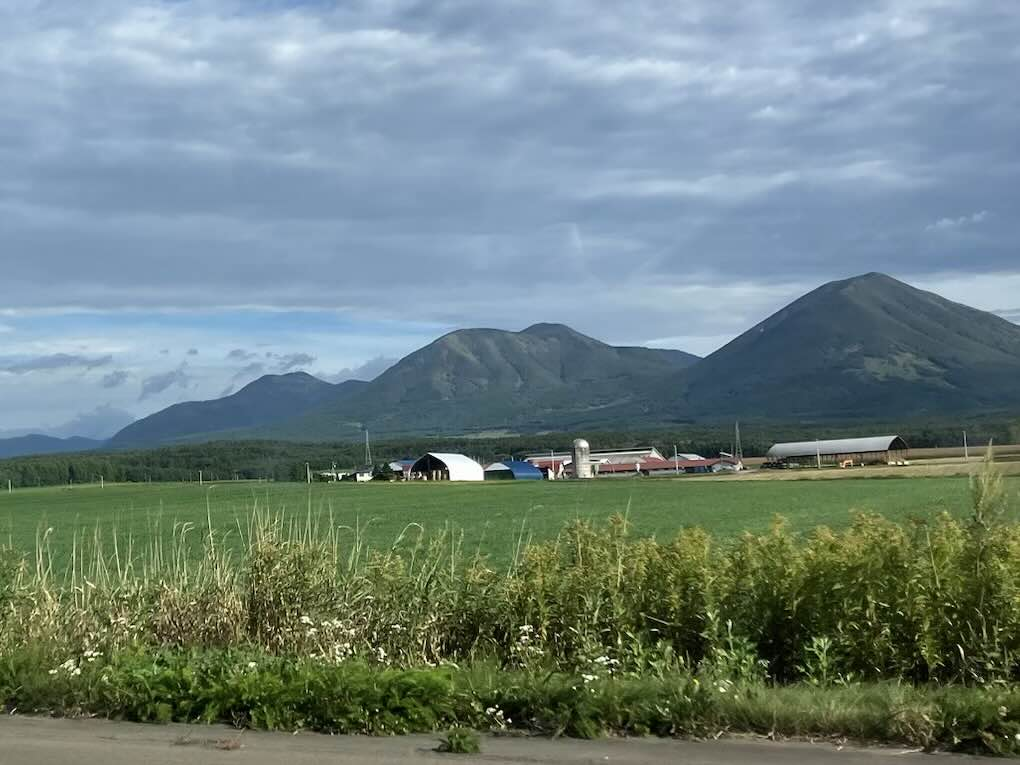
Mt. Nishinupukaushinupuri

== Sister city relations ==
- - Stony Plain, Alberta, Canada, since 1984 Since that time, ongoing exchange programs have kept the relationship strong. The exchange program has also provided Shikaoi the opportunity to advance by visiting ideas gathered during exchanges.
