= Honbetsu, Hokkaido =

Town in Japan

Honbetsu 本別町 Honbetsu-chō
- Town
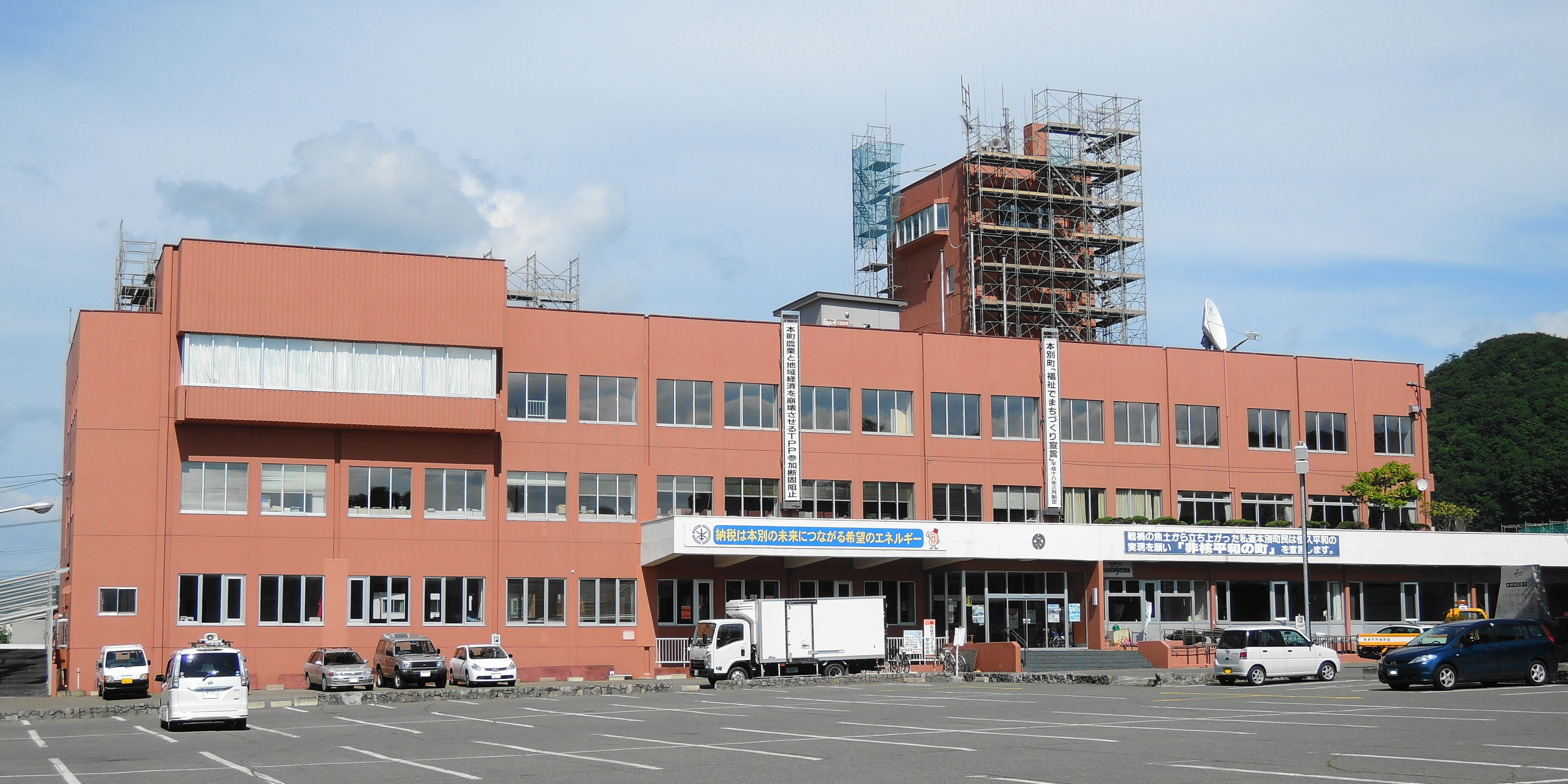
- Honbetsu Town Hall

- Flag Emblem

- Location of Honbetsu in Hokkaido (Tokachi Subprefecture)
- Interactive map of Honbetsu
- Coordinates: 43°07′29″N 143°36′39″E
- Country: Japan
- Region: Hokkaido
- Prefecture: Hokkaido (Tokachi Subprefecture)
- District: Nakagawa (Tokachi)

Area
  - Total: 391.91 km^{2} (151.32 sq mi)

Population (November 30, 2025)
  - Total: 5,868
  - Density: 14.97/km^{2} (38.78/sq mi)
- Time zone: UTC+09:00 (JST)
- City hall address: 2-4-1 Kita, Honbetsu-cho, Nakagawa-gun, Hokkaido 089-3392
- Climate: Dfb
- Website: www.town.honbetsu.hokkaido.jp
- Symbols
- Bird: Great spotted woodpecker
- Flower: Ezo Rhododendron
- Tree: Daimyo Oak

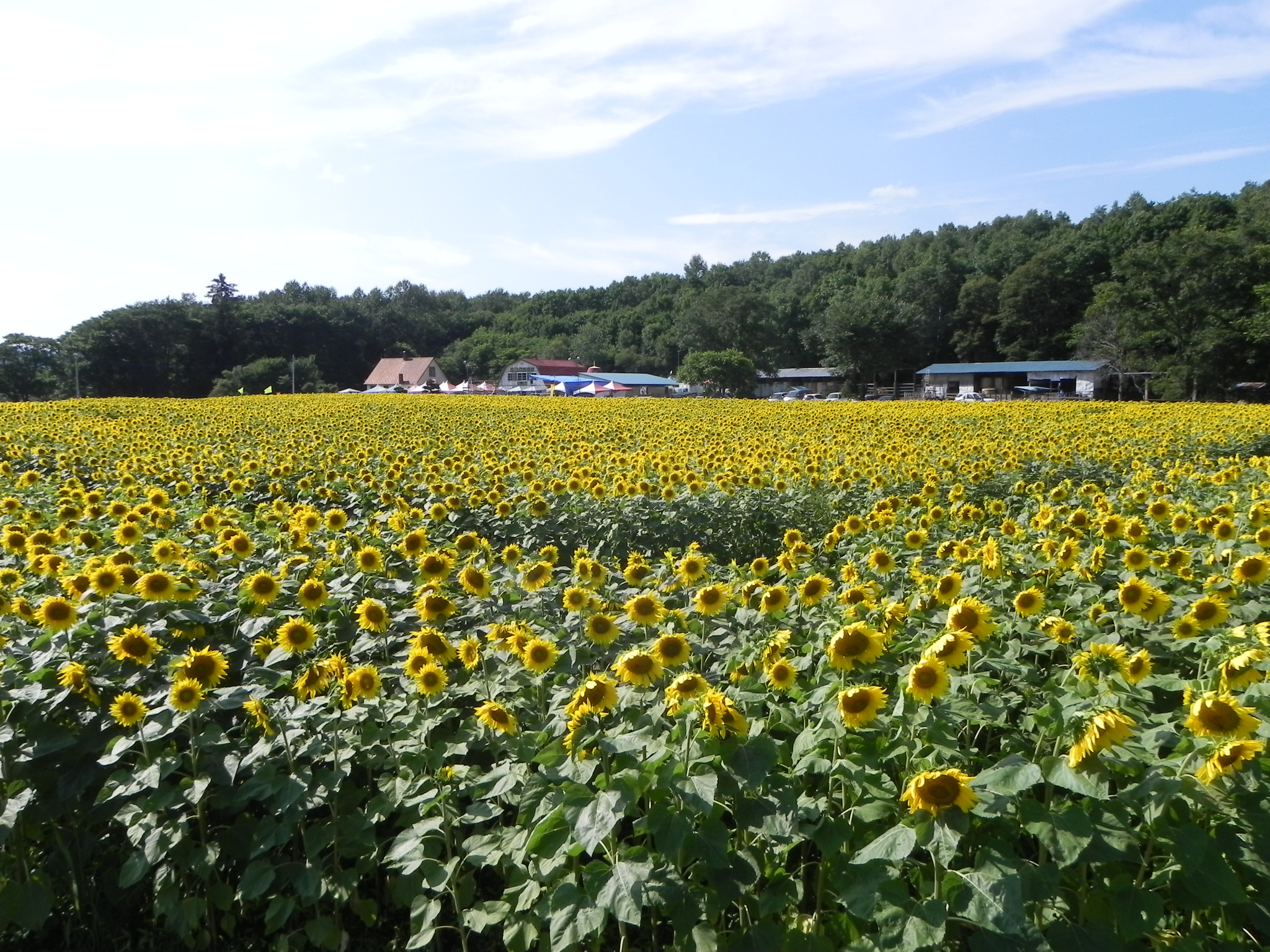
Sunflower fields in Honbetsu

Honbetsu (本別町, Honbetsu-chō) is a town located in Tokachi Subprefecture, Hokkaidō, Japan. As of 30 November 2025, the town had an estimated population of 5,868 in 3264 households, and a population density of 15 people per km^{2}. The total area of the town is 391.91 km^{2} (151.32 sq mi).

== Geography ==
Honbetsu is located in southeastern Hokkaido, in the northeastern part of the Tokachi Subprefecture. The Tobetsu River runs north–south through the center of the town, connecting tributaries from the hills to the east and west. A small, basin-shaped plain stretches out in the southern part of the town where the Misatobetsu River joins the Tobetsu River, and this is where the town center is located. The town is a transportation hub, located at the intersection of a road connecting Obihiro and Kitami and a road connecting the northern Tokachi Plain from east-to-west. The Doto Expressway has a junction in Honbetsu, where it branches off to Kitami and Kushiro.

=== Neighboring municipalities ===
- Ikeda
- Ashoro
- Shihoro
- Kamishihoro
- Urahoro
- Shiranuka

=== Climate ===
According to the Köppen climate classification, Honbetsu has a humid continental climate. It has large temperature differences, including large annual and daily temperature ranges. It receives a lot of snow, and is designated as a heavy snow area. In winter, temperatures below −25 °C (−13 °F) are not uncommon, making it extremely cold.

Climate data for Honbetsu（1991 - 2020）
Month	Jan	Feb	Mar	Apr	May	Jun	Jul	Aug	Sep	Oct	Nov	Dec	Year
Record high °C (°F)	7.4 (45.3)	14.4 (57.9)	18.2 (64.8)	30.9 (87.6)	37.2 (99.0)	35.6 (96.1)	37.1 (98.8)	36.3 (97.3)	33.7 (92.7)	29.1 (84.4)	21.1 (70.0)	14.7 (58.5)	37.2 (99.0)
Mean daily maximum °C (°F)	−1.5 (29.3)	−0.3 (31.5)	4.5 (40.1)	11.9 (53.4)	18.0 (64.4)	21.4 (70.5)	24.5 (76.1)	25.4 (77.7)	21.9 (71.4)	15.8 (60.4)	8.2 (46.8)	0.7 (33.3)	12.6 (54.7)
Daily mean °C (°F)	−8.9 (16.0)	−7.3 (18.9)	−1.1 (30.0)	5.4 (41.7)	11.2 (52.2)	15.2 (59.4)	18.9 (66.0)	20.0 (68.0)	16.2 (61.2)	9.4 (48.9)	2.4 (36.3)	−5.5 (22.1)	6.3 (43.3)
Mean daily minimum °C (°F)	−16.1 (3.0)	−14.9 (5.2)	−6.9 (19.6)	−0.5 (31.1)	5.1 (41.2)	10.2 (50.4)	14.6 (58.3)	15.9 (60.6)	11.5 (52.7)	3.7 (38.7)	−2.7 (27.1)	−11.7 (10.9)	0.7 (33.3)
Record low °C (°F)	−29.1 (−20.4)	−27.4 (−17.3)	−24.8 (−12.6)	−12.4 (9.7)	−4.3 (24.3)	−0.4 (31.3)	4.9 (40.8)	5.3 (41.5)	0.3 (32.5)	−6.3 (20.7)	−17.8 (0.0)	−26.8 (−16.2)	−29.1 (−20.4)
Average precipitation mm (inches)	29.2 (1.15)	18.9 (0.74)	32.4 (1.28)	54.2 (2.13)	78.4 (3.09)	67.0 (2.64)	100.1 (3.94)	132.4 (5.21)	118.0 (4.65)	79.4 (3.13)	42.9 (1.69)	37.5 (1.48)	790.6 (31.13)
Average snowfall cm (inches)	67 (26)	56 (22)	59 (23)	15 (5.9)	1 (0.4)	0 (0)	0 (0)	0 (0)	0 (0)	0 (0)	12 (4.7)	65 (26)	276 (109)
Average precipitation days (≥ 1.0 mm)	4.7	4.2	5.8	8.3	9.8	9.2	10.0	10.9	10.1	8.3	7.1	6.2	94.6
Mean monthly sunshine hours	177.2	178.5	206.5	185.3	177.6	150.2	125.6	127.5	140.6	164.1	160.1	161.9	1,954.9

=== Demographics ===
Per Japanese census data, the population of Honbetsu has declined in recent decades.

Historical population
Year	Pop.	±%
1970	14,804	—
1980	13,253	−10.5%
1990	11,484	−13.3%
2000	10,021	−12.7%
2010	8,276	−17.4%
2020	6,618	−20.0%

== History ==
Beginning around 1798, guardhouses and trading were established in the Otsu area by Matsumae Domain for trade with the Ainu people. Following the Meiji restoration, a headsman's office was established in Otsu. Ninomiya Takachika (grandson of Ninomiya Sontoku) moved to Otsu in 1896. Toyokoro separated from Otsu in 1899 and merged with Chashikocha Village on April 1, 1906, forming the second-class village of Toyokoro. It was raised to town status on January 1, 1955.

== Government ==
Honbetsu has a mayor-council form of government with a directly elected mayor and a unicameral town council of 12 members. Honbetsu, as part of Tokachi Subprefecture, contributes four members to the Hokkaidō Prefectural Assembly. In terms of national politics, the town is part of the Hokkaidō 11th district of the lower house of the Diet of Japan.

== Economy ==
Honbetsu has long relied on forestry as its economic base and was once very prosperous, but in recent years it has become primarily agricultural. Field crops include wheat, beans, and sugar beets. Dairy farming is also widespread.

== Education ==
Honbetsu has one public elementary school and one public middle school operated by the town. The town one public high school operated by the Hokkaido Board of Education.

== Transportation ==
=== Railway ===
Honbetsu does not have any passenger rail service. The nearest railway station is Ikeda Station n the JR Hokkaido Nemuro Main Line.

=== Highways ===
- Dōtō Expressway
- National Route 242
- National Route 276
- National Route 392

== Sister city relations ==
- Shire of Mitchell, Victoria, Australia
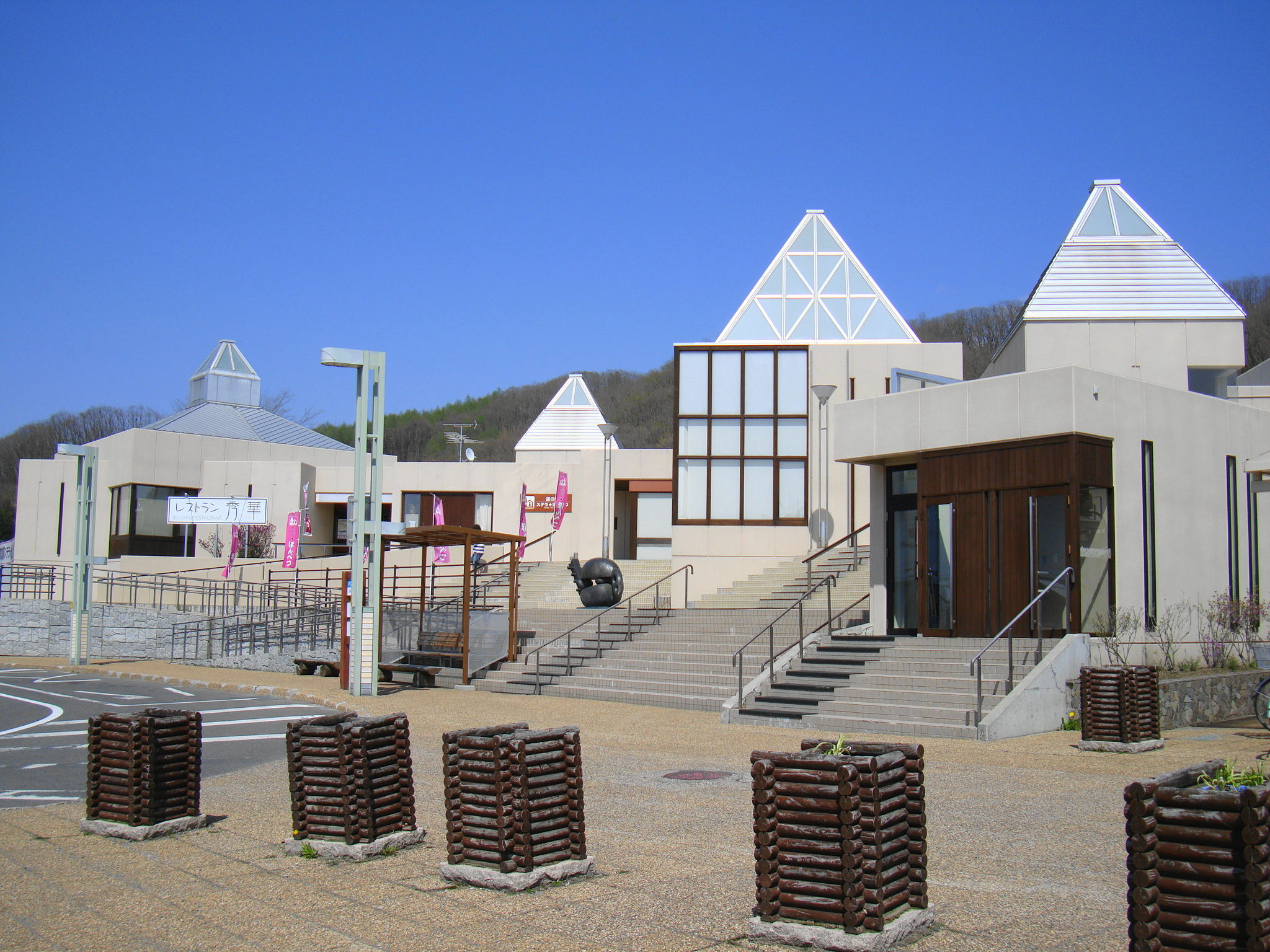
Honbetsu road station

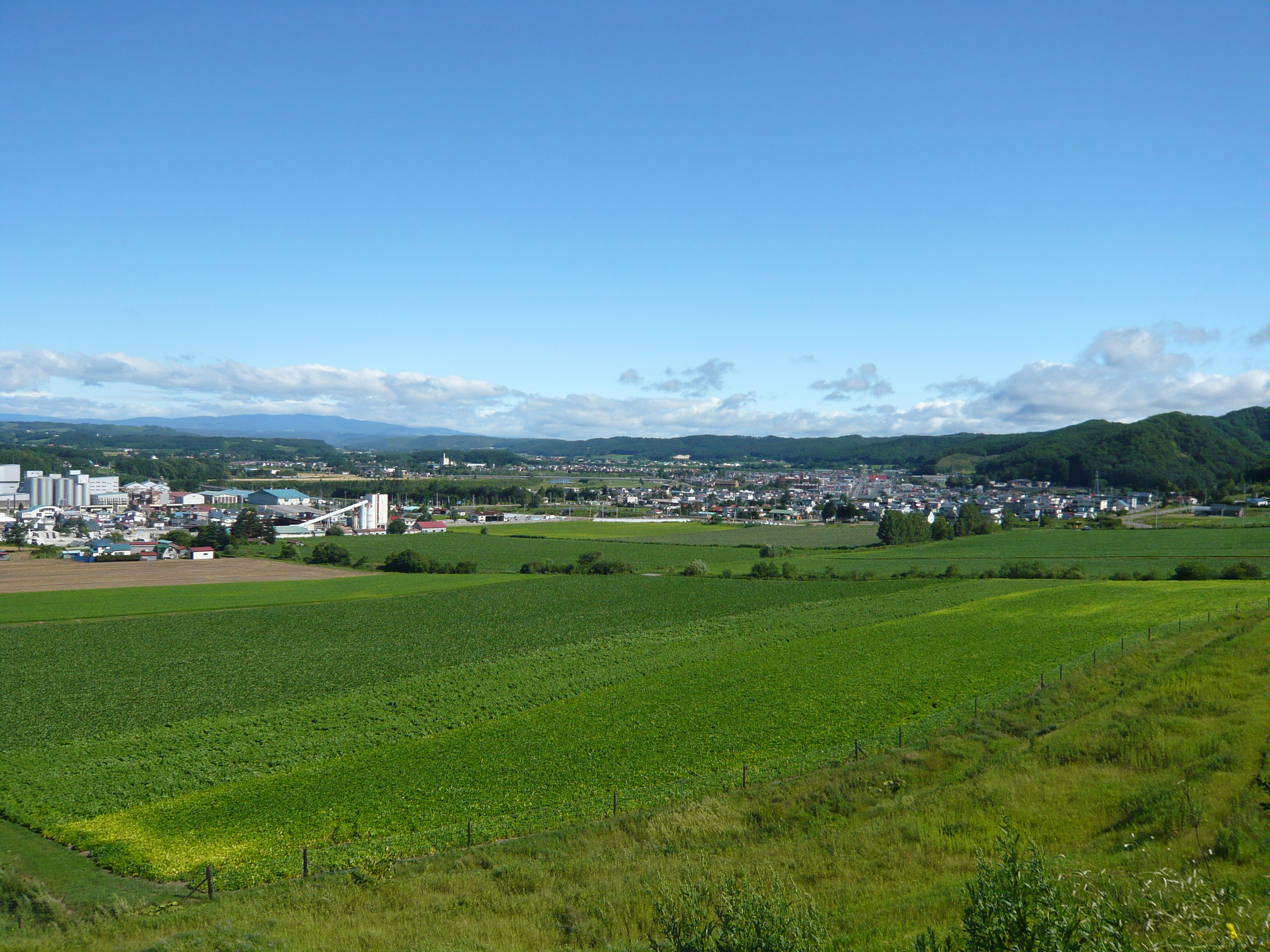
Panorama of central Honbetsu (north)

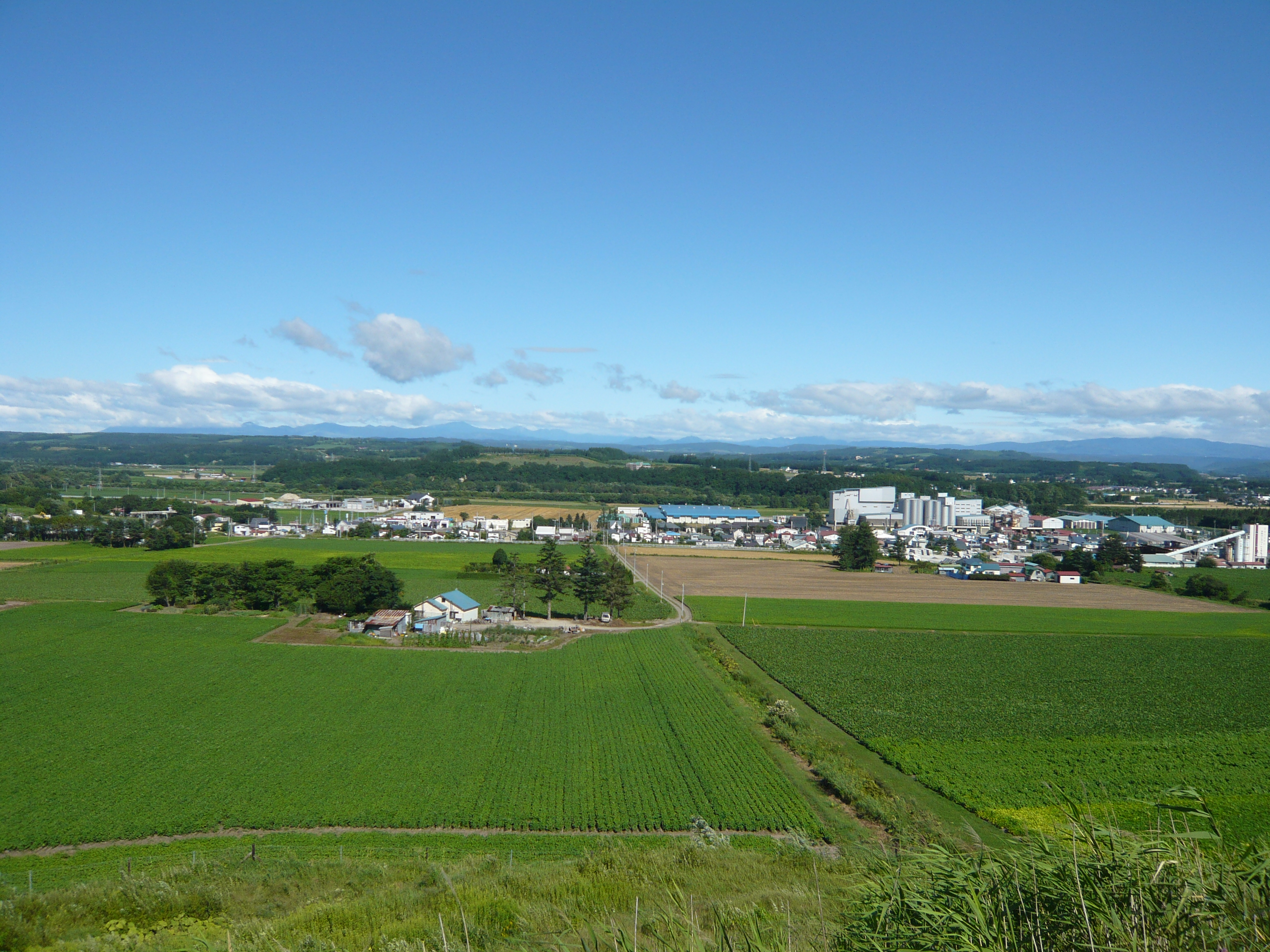
Panorama of central Honbetsu (south)

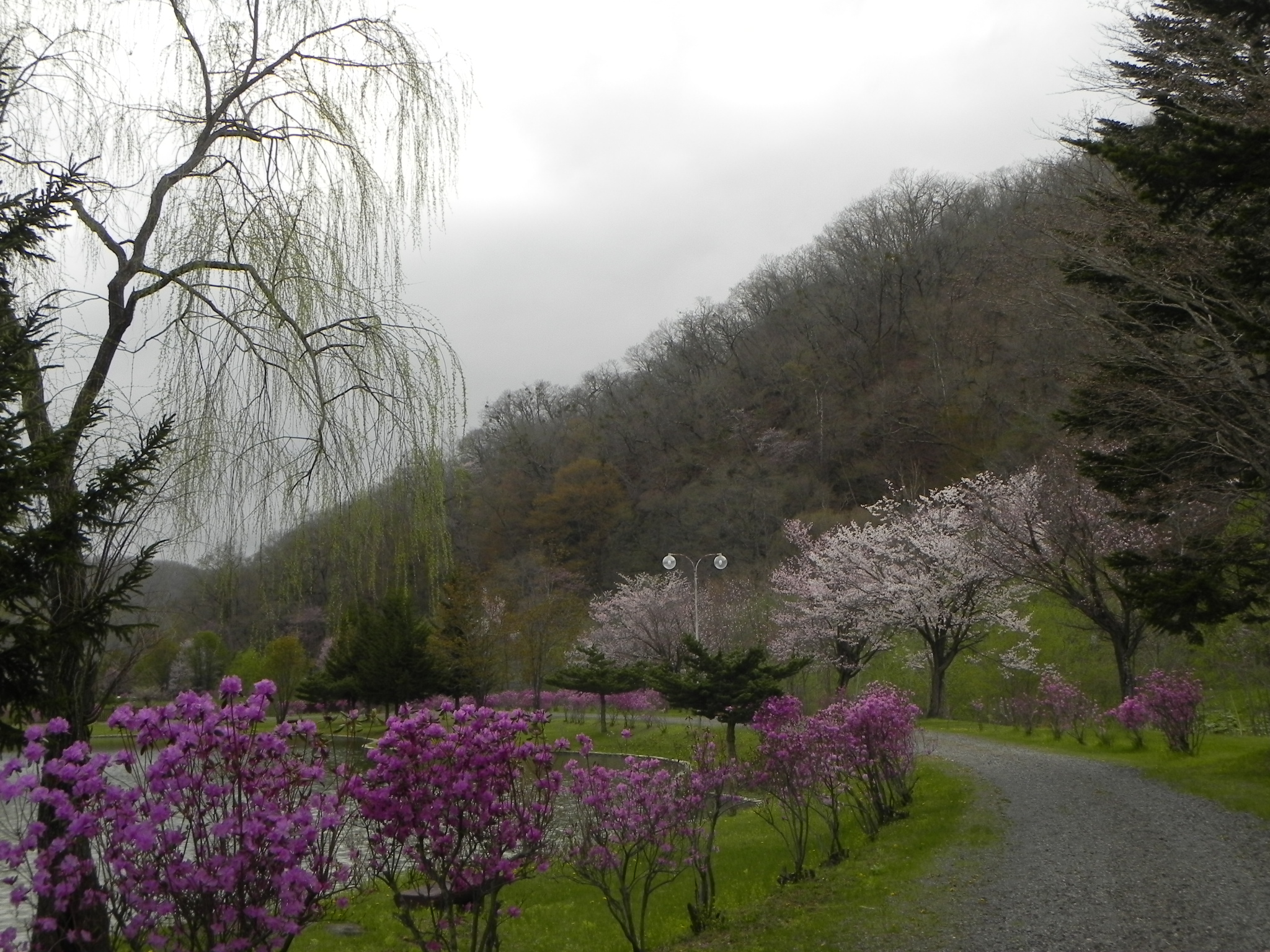
Honbetsu Park

== Mascot ==
Genki-kun, the town's mascot

Honbetsu's mascot is Genki-kun (元気くん). He is a soybean filled with dynamism and easiness. He is unveiled in 2001. His quote "Ii hito iimachi ikiikihonbetsu" (いいひと いいまち いきいきほんべつ) is a tongue twister.
