= Tokachi District, Hokkaido =

District in Hokkaidō, Japan

Coordinates: 42.915°N 143.691°E

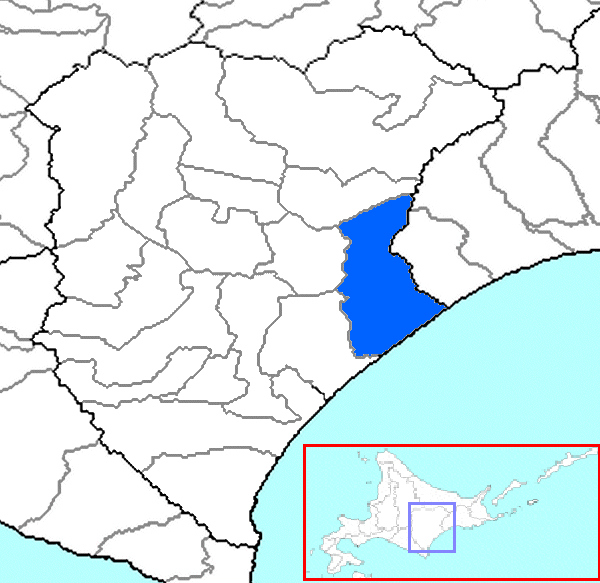
The area of Tokachi District in Tokachi Subprefecture

Tokachi District (十勝郡, Tokachi-gun) is a district located in Tokachi Subprefecture, Hokkaido, Japan.

As of 2004, the district has an estimated population of 6,342 and a density of 8.69 persons per km^{2}. The total area is 729.64 km^{2}.

== Towns ==
- Urahoro

== History ==
- April 1, 1906: Part of Tōbui Village in the former Tōbui District incorporated into Ōtsu Village. Part of Tabikorai Village, Nakagawa District was also incorporated into Ōtsu Village.
- April 1, 1955: Ōtsu Village split up among Taiki Town, Hiroo District, Toyokoro Village (now Town), Nakagawa District, and Urahoro.
