= Nakagawa (Tokachi) District, Hokkaido =

District in Hokkaido, Japan

Coordinates: 42°54′00″N 143°25′12″E

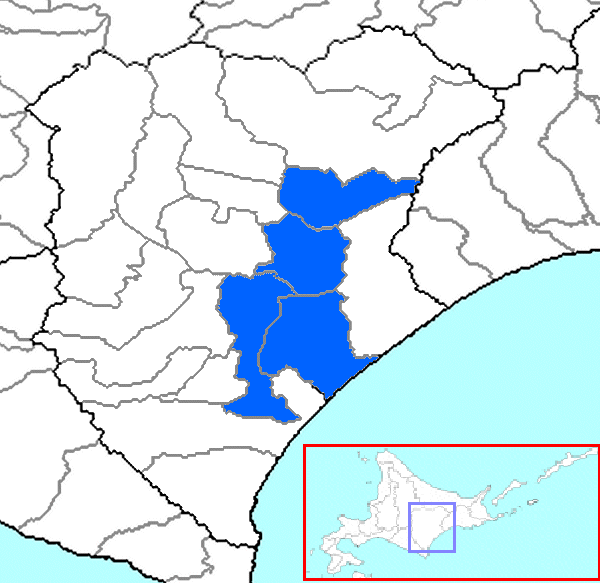
The area of Nakagawa District in Tokachi Subprefecture.

Nakagawa (Tokachi) (中川郡 (十勝), Nakagawa-gun (Tokachi)) is a district located in Tokachi Subprefecture, Hokkaido, Japan. There is a district with the same name in Kamikawa Subprefecture, see Nakagawa (Teshio) District, Hokkaido.

As of 2004, the district has an estimated population of 46,499 and a density of 28.34 persons per km^{2}. The total area is 1,640.88 km^{2}.

== Towns ==
- Honbetsu
- Ikeda
- Makubetsu
- Toyokoro

== History ==
- 1869 - Nakagawa District created as part of Tokachi Province
- April 1, 1906 - Part of Tabikorai Village incorporated into Ōtsu Village, Tokachi District
- April 1, 1925 - Part of Ikeda Village incorporated into Shihoro Village (now town), Katō District
- April 1, 1926 - Part of Makubetsu Village incorporated into Taishō Village, Kasai District
- June 1, 1933 - Part of Ikeda Town incorporated into Shihoro Village, Katō District
- April 1, 1948 - Part of Makubetsu Town incorporated into Taisho Village and Sarabetsu Village, Kasai District
- April 1, 1955 - Nishiashoro Town merged with Ashoro Village, Ashoro District forming Ashoro Town, Ashoro District
- April 1, 1955 - Part of Ōtsu Village, Tokaichi District incorporated into Toyokoro Village
- February 6, 2006 - the village of Chūrui, from Hiroo District, merged into the town of Makubetsu.
