= Hiroo District, Hokkaido =

District in Hokkaido, Japan

Hiroo District
- District
- 広尾郡 (Hiroo-gun)
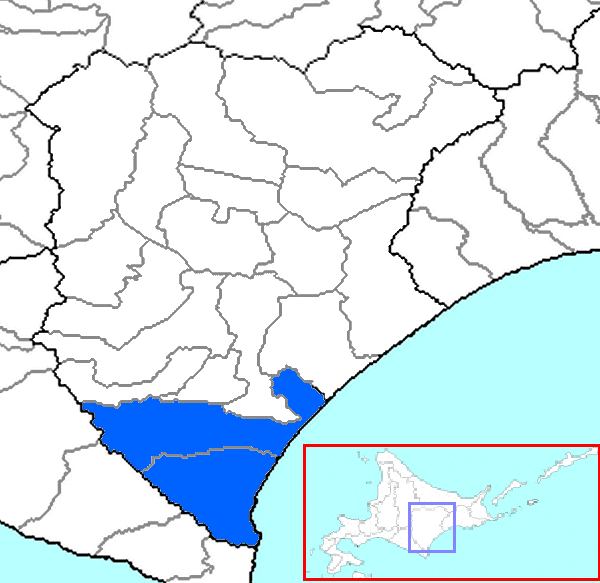
- Hiroo District in Tokachi Subprefecture
- Coordinates: 42°17′N 143°19′E
- Country: Japan
- Region: Hokkaido
- Prefecture: Hokkaido
- Subprefecture: Tokachi Subprefecture
- Municipalities: Hiroo; Taiki

Area
  - Total: 1,550.06 km^{2} (598.48 sq mi)

Population (April 2025)
  - Total: 10,394
  - Density: 6.7055/km^{2} (17.367/sq mi)
- Time zone: UTC+9 (JST)

Hiroo (広尾郡, Hiroo-gun) is a district located in Tokachi Subprefecture, Hokkaido, Japan.

As of April 2025, the district has an estimated population of 10,394. The total area is 1,550.06 km^{2}.

== Towns and villages ==
- Hiroo
- Taiki

== History ==
- April 1, 1906 Taiki Village, Rekifune Village, and part of Tōbui Village from the former Tōbui District merge with Moyori Village (now Hiroo Town)
- April 1, 1955 Part of Ōtsu Village, Tokachi District incorporated into Taiki Town.
- On February 6, 2006 the village of Chūrui merged into the town of Makubetsu, in Nakagawa (Tokachi) District.

== Sources ==
- Chieda, Yoemon, ed. (1925). Tokachi Hōmeikan 十勝宝盟鑑 [Tokachi Directory] (in Japanese). Tokachi Sankōsha.
- Kadokawa Nihon Chimei Daijiten Hensan Iinkai, ed. (1987). Kadokawa Nihon Chimei Daijiten 1: Hokkaidō 角川日本地名大辞典 1 北海道 [Kadokawa Japanese Place Name Dictionary 1: Hokkaido] (in Japanese). Kadokawa Shoten. ISBN 4040010116.
