= Tokachi Subprefecture =

Coordinates: 42°55′47″N 143°12′30″E

Tokachi Subprefecture 十勝総合振興局
- Tokachi-sōgō-shinkō-kyoku
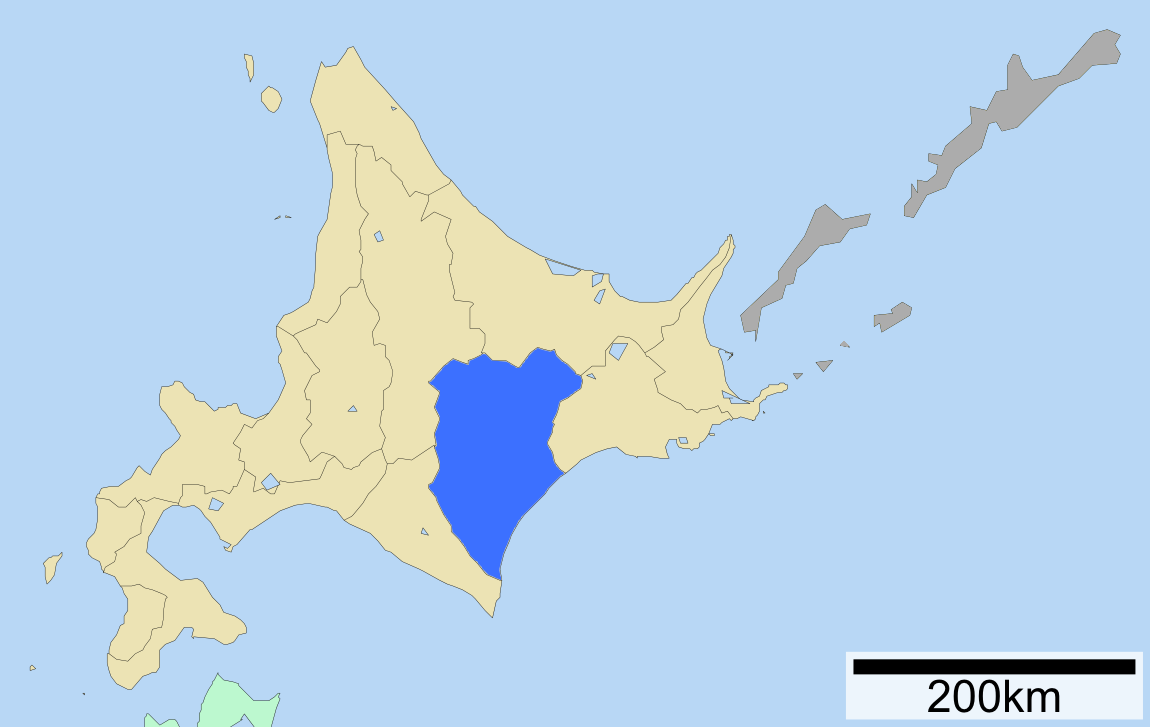
- Prefecture: Hokkaido
- Capital: Obihiro

Area
  - Total: 10,831.24 km^{2} (4,181.97 sq mi)

Population (March 2009)
  - Total: 354,147
  - Density: 33/km^{2} (85/sq mi)
- Website: tokachi.pref.hokkaido.lg.jp

Tokachi Subprefecture (literally "Tokachi Comprehensive Promotion Bureau") (十勝総合振興局, Tokachi-sōgō-shinkō-kyoku) is a subprefecture of Hokkaido Prefecture, Japan corresponding to the old province of Tokachi. As of 2004, its estimated population is 360,802 and its area is 10,830.99 km^{2}.

Tokachi-Obihiro Airport is in the city of Obihiro.

== Geography ==
=== Municipalities ===
Name		Area (km^{2})	Population	District	Type	Map
Rōmaji	Kanji	Area (km^{2})	Population	District	Type	Map
Ashoro	足寄町	1,408.09	7,150	Ashoro District	Town	
Hiroo	広尾町	596.14	7,182	Hiroo District	Town	
Honbetsu	本別町	391.99	7,441	Nakagawa District	Town	
Ikeda	池田町	371.91	6,933	Nakagawa District	Town	
Kamishihoro	上士幌町	700.87	4,908	Katō District	Town	
Makubetsu	幕別町	340.46	26,610	Nakagawa District	Town	
Memuro	芽室町	513.91	18,806	Kasai District	Town	
Nakasatsunai	中札内村	292.69	3,980	Kasai District	Village	
Obihiro (capital)	帯広市	618.94	165,851	no district	City	
Otofuke	音更町	466.09	44,235	Katō District	Town	
Rikubetsu	陸別町	608.81	2,528	Ashoro District	Town	
Sarabetsu	更別村	176.45	3,275	Kasai District	Village	
Shihoro	士幌町	259.13	6,234	Katō District	Town	
Shikaoi	鹿追町	399.69	5,570	Katō District	Town	
Shimizu	清水町	402.18	9,784	Kamikawa District	Town	
Shintoku	新得町	1,063.79	6,285	Kamikawa District	Town	
Taiki	大樹町	816.38	5,742	Hiroo District	Town	
Toyokoro	豊頃町	536.52	3,262	Nakagawa District	Town	
Urahoro	浦幌町	729.64	5,023	Tokachi District	Town	

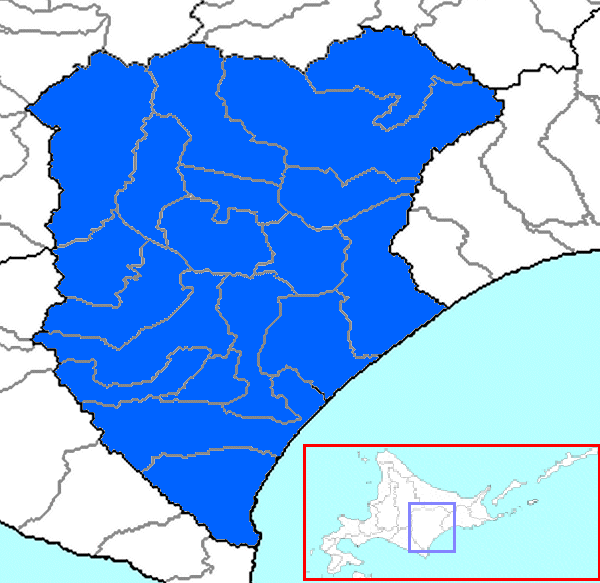
Tokachi Subprefecture

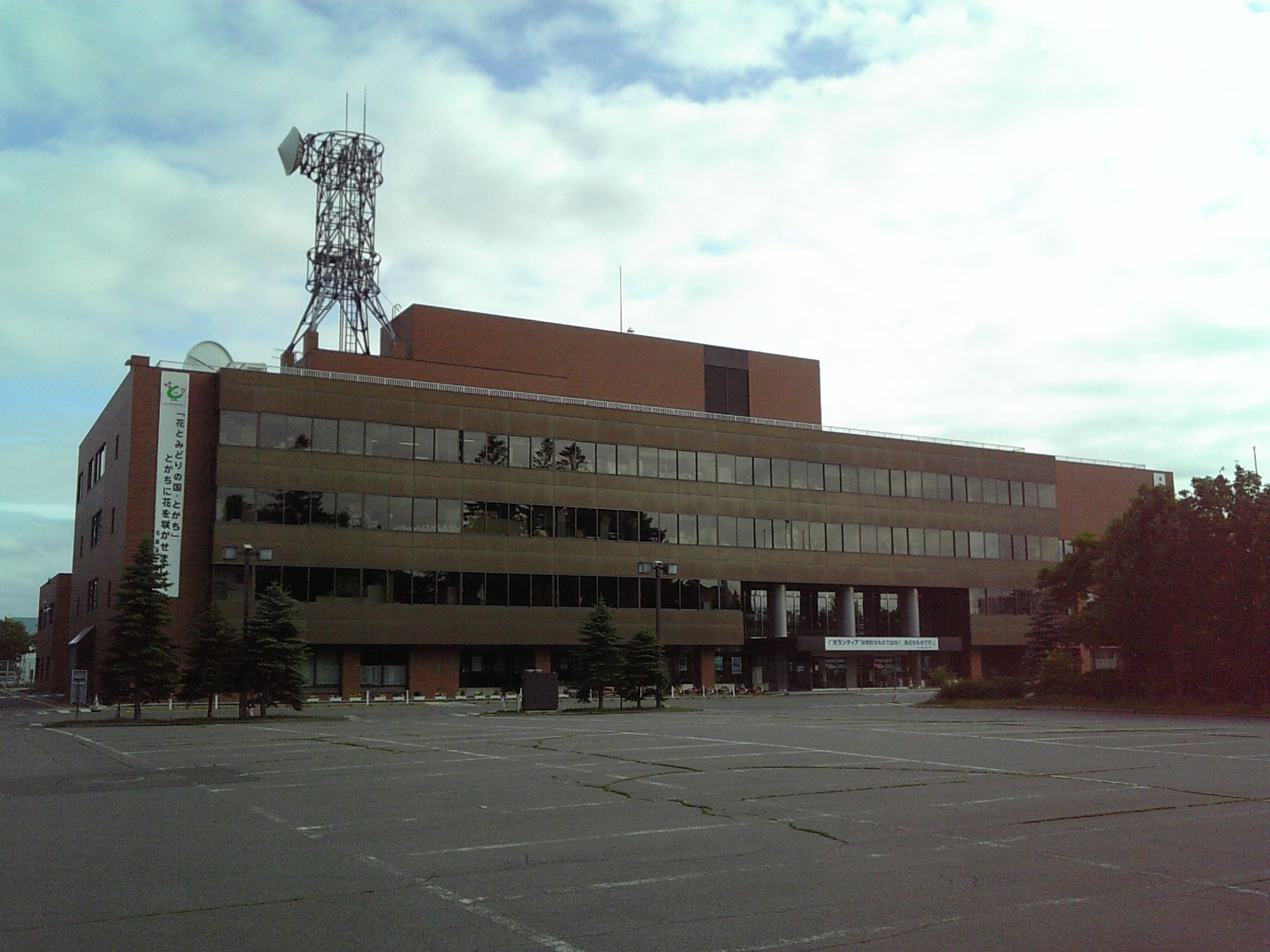
Tokachi subprefectural office building

== History ==
- November 1897: Kasai Subprefecture established.
- August 1932: Kasai Subprefecture renamed Tokachi Subprefecture.
- October 20, 1948: Ashoro District transferred from Kushiro Subprefecture.
