= List of coal mines in Japan =

This list of mines in Japan is subsidiary to the list of mines article and lists working, defunct and future mines in the country and is organised by the primary mineral output.

== Card of mines of Japan ==
The mines of Japan

== List of mines ==
| Mine | Top Annual Production | Coordinates | Associated Town | Owner | Dates | Coalfield |
|---|---|---|---|---|---|---|
| Iwate mine | | 39.885°N 141.631°E | Iwaizumi, Iwate | | ? | |
| Hokutan Horonai coal mine | 1500.000 | 43.221°N 141.909°E | Mikasa | Hokutan | 1879–1989 | Ishikari |
| Hokutan Ikushunbetsu Coal Mine | 200.000 | 43.261°N 141.968°E | Ikushunbetsu | Hokutan | 1885–1957 | Ishikari |
| Sumitomo Ponbetsu coal mine | 1500.000 | 43.265°N 141.960°E | Mikasa | Sumitomo | 1902–1971 | Ishikari |
| Sumitomo Yayoi coal mine | | 43.259°N 141.938°E | Mikasa | Sumitomo | 1905–1970 | Ishikari |
| Mitsubishi Bibai coal mine | 1600.000 | 43.334°N 141.969°E | Bibai | Mitsubishi | 1913–1972 | Ishikari |
| Mitsui Bibai coal mine | 1000.000 | 43.334°N 141.917°E | Bibai | Mitsui | 1918–1963 | Ishikari |
| Hokutan Yūbari coal mine | 2000.000 | 43.064°N 141.985°E | Yūbari | Hokutan | 1890–1977 | Ishikari |
| Hokutan Mayachi coal mine | 700.000 | 42.971°N 142.071°E | Yūbari | Hokutan | 1905–1987 | Ishikari |
| Mitsubishi Ōyūbari coal mine | 1000.000 | 43.097°N 142.095°E | Yūbari | Mitsubishi | 1906–1973 | Ishikari |
| Hokutan Heiwa coal mine | 1000.000 | 43.017°N 141.991°E | Yūbari | Hokutan | 1937–1975 | Ishikari |
| Mitsubishi Minami Ōyūbari coal mine | | 43.029°N 142.090°E | Yūbari | Mitsubishi | 1966–1990 | Ishikari |
| Hokutan Yūbari Shin coal mine | | 42.984°N 142.017°E | Yūbari | Hokutan | 1970–1981 | Ishikari |
| Hokutan Manji coal mine | 500.000 | 43.134°N 141.992°E | Manji | Hokutan | 1905–1976 | Ishikari |
| Hokutan Miruto coal mine | | | Miruto | Hokutan | 1917–1969 | Ishikari |
| Hokutan Kakuta coal mine | | | Kakuta | Hokutan | 1927–1953 | Ishikari |
| Sumitomo Akabira coal mine | 1900.000 | 43.548°N 142.056°E | Akabira | Sumitomo | 1895–1993 | Ishikari |
| Moshiri coal mine | | | Akabira | Yūbetsu | 1918–1969 | Ishikari |
| Toyosato coal mine | | | Akabira | Toyosato Mining Company | 1937–1954 | Ishikari |
| Hokutan Akama coal mine | | 43.553°N 142.048°E | Akabira | Hokutan | 1938–1973 | Ishikari |
| Sorachi coal mine | 1500.000 | 43.511°N 142.052°E | Utashinai | Hokutan | 1890–1995 | Ishikari |
| Hokutan Kamui coal mine | 500.000 | | Utashinai | Hokutan | 1891–1971 | Ishikari |
| Sumitomo Kami Utashinai coal mine | 300.000 | 43.524°N 142.052°E | Utashinai | Sumitomo | 1894–1988 | Ishikari |
| Sumitomo Utashinai coal mine | 800.000 | | Utashinai | Sumitomo | 1905–1971 | Ishikari |
| Mitsubishi Ashibetsu coal mine | 300.000 | | Ashibetsu | Mitsubishi | 1914–1964 | Ishikari |
| Yuya coal mine | 200.000 | | Utashinai | Yuya | 19**–1965 | Ishikari |
| Meiji mining kami Ashibetsu coal mine | 100.000 | | Ashibetsu | Meiji mining | 1935–1963 | Ishikari |
| Takane coal mine | 200.000 | | Ashibetsu | Takane | 1938–1967 | Ishikari |
| Mitsui Ashibetsu coal mine | 1700.000 | | Ashibetsu | Mitsui | 1939–1992 | Ishikari |
| Mitsui Sunagawa coal mine | 1600.000 | 43.467°N 142.013°E | Kamisunagawa | Mitsui | 1914–1987 | Ishikari |
| Mitsui Oku Naie coal mine | 460.000 | | Naie | Mitsui | 1947–1966 | Ishikari |
| Shōwa coal mine | | | Numata | Shōwa | 1930–1969 | Rumoi |
| Asano Uryū coal mine | | | Numata | Shōwa | 1930–1968 | Rumoi |
| Haboro coal mine | | | Happoro | Shōwa | 1948–1970 | Rumoi |
| Yoshio coal mine | | 33.633466°N 130.711221°E | X | Asō | | Chikuhō |
| Kamimio coal mine | | 33.620987°N 130.716355°E | X | Asō | | Chikuhō |
| Tsunawaki coal mine | | 33.635951°N 130.730315°E | X | Asō | | Chikuhō |
| Miike coal mine | | 33.014°N 130.456°E | Ōmuta | Mitsui | 1872–1997 | Miike |
| Mitsi Ikeshima Coal Mine | | 32.885°N 129.601°E | Ikeshima | Mitsubishi | 2002 | Nishisonogi |
| Mitsubishi Takashima Coal Mine | | 32.66°N 129.75°E | Takashima | Mitsubishi | 1984 | Nishisonogi |
| Mitsubishi Hashima coal mine | | 32.628°N 129.738°E | Hashima | Mitsubishi | 1869–1974 | Nishisonogi |
| Iriomote Coal Mine | 130.000 | | Iriomote | Mitsui | 1886–1960 | Okinawa |
| Utara Coal Mine | 30.000 | | Iriomote | Marusan Mining Company | 1936–1943 | Okinawa |
