= Ishikari coalfield =

Coalfield in Sorachi, Hokkaido, Japan

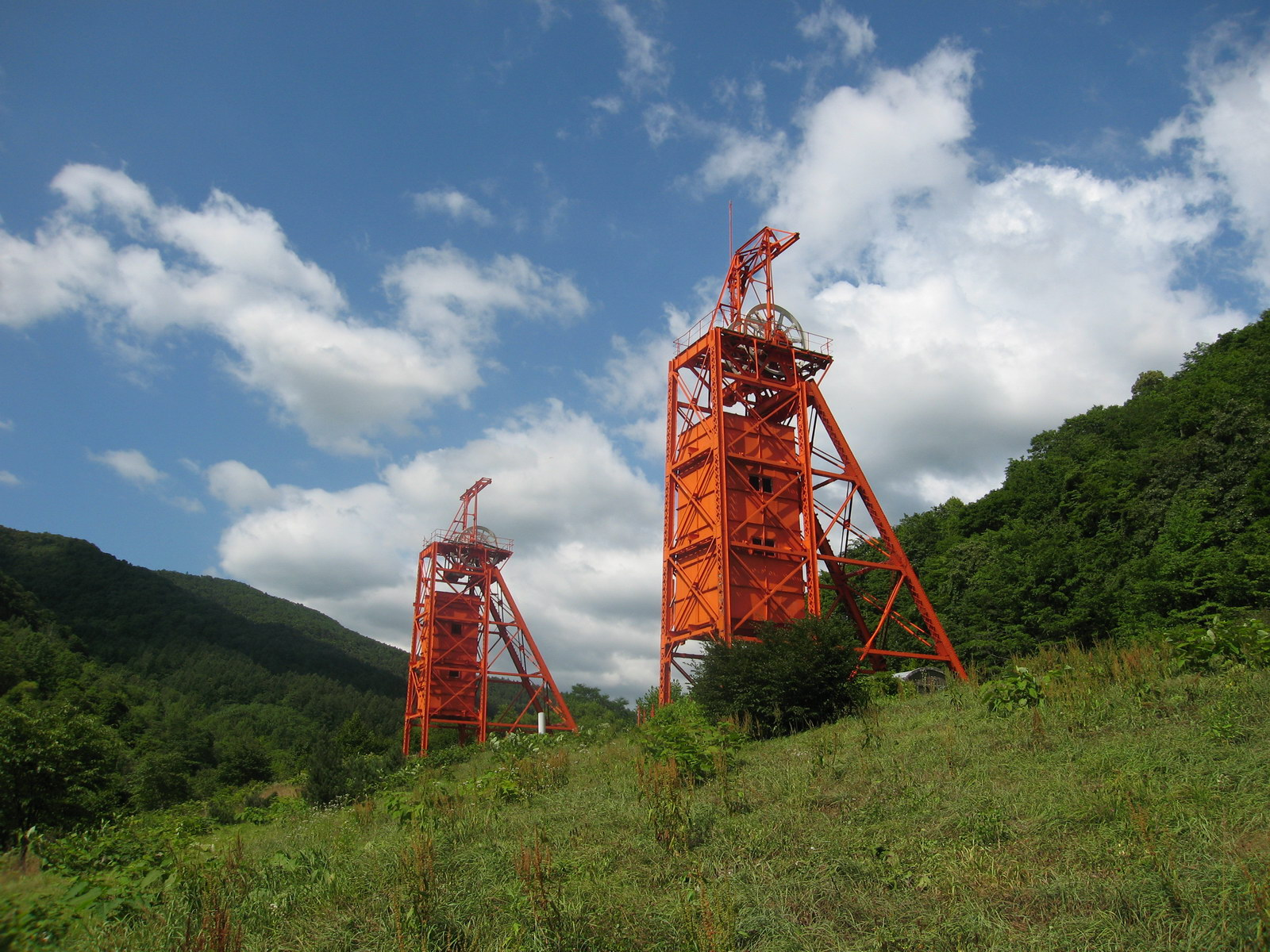

The Ishikari coal basin lies in the tertiary mountains of the mining region of Sorachi, east of the Ishikari Plain in central Hokkaido. These coal veins contain the largest quantity of coal of Japan. Because of its late discovery the historical role of the coalfield could not be compared with that of the Chikuho coalfield, but its economic importance since the Japanese industrial revolution is comparable with that of the southern Chikuhō coalfield.

== Discovery ==
It was explorer Matsuura Takeshirō (松浦 武四郎), who, during his journey through Hokkaido in 1857, first marked the coal seams on the banks of the Sorachi river near Akabira. In 1868, carpenter Kimura Kichitarō (木村 吉太郎) discovered coal in Horonai, Mikasa (三笠). However, it took another six years before the local government took action, and the mining engineers Benjamin Smith Lyman and Takeaki Enomoto welded an investigation. Their findings were satisfactory, and the Meiji government decided to build in Horonai the first coalmine of the Ishikari coal basin. In 1889, the Meiji government sold off the mine and its railways to, Hori Motoi, who found the Hokkaido Colliery and Railway Company (北海道炭礦鉄道会社 Hokkaidō Tankō Tetsudō Kaisha), abbreviated as Hokutan.

Alongside to the historic mine Horonai this basin is also home to the famous mining town of Yūbari (夕張市). Here in 1888, coal was discovered by engineer Ban Ichitarō (坂 市太郎, 1854-1920), a follower of Benjamin Smith Lyman, on the upper reaches of the river Shihorokabetsu (士幌加別川). The following year, Hokutan opened its first colliery in Yūbari, the Yūbari Saitanjo (夕張採炭所).

== Location of the coalfield and its collieries ==
The coalmines of Hokkaidō

== List of coal mines in Ishikari ==
| Number | Mine | Top Annual Production | Coordinates | Associated Town | Owner | Start Date | Closing Date |
|---|---|---|---|---|---|---|---|
| 1 | Hokutan Horonai coal mine | 1500.000 | 43.221°N 141.909°E | Mikasa | Hokutan | 1879 | 1989 |
| 2 | Hokutan Ikushunbetsu coal mine | 200.000 | 43.261°N 141.968°E | Ikushunbetsu | Hokutan | 1885 | 1957 |
| 3 | Sorachi coal mine | 1500.000 | 43.511°N 142.052°E | Utashinai | Hokutan | 1890 | 1995 |
| 4 | Hokutan Yūbari coal mine | 2000.000 | 43.064°N 141.985°E | Yūbari | Hokutan | 1890 | 1977 |
| 5 | Hokutan Kamui coal mine | 500.000 | | Utashinai | Hokutan | 1891 | 1971 |
| 6 | Sumitomo Kami Utashinai coal mine | 300.000 | 43.524°N 142.052°E | Utashinai | Sumitomo | 1894 | 1988 |
| 7 | Sumitomo Akabira coal mine | 1900.000 | 43.548°N 142.056°E | Akabira | Sumitomo | 1895 | 1993 |
| 8 | Mitsui Sunagawa coal mine | 1600.000 | 43.467°N 142.013°E | Kamisunagawa | Mitsui | 1899 | 1987 |
| 9 | Sumitomo Ponbetsu coal mine | 1500.000 | 43.265°N 141.910°E | Mikasa | Sumitomo | 1902 | 1971 |
| 10 | Sumitomo Yayoi coal mine | | 43.259°N 141.938°E | Mikasa | Sumitomo | 1905 | 1970 |
| 11 | Sumitomo Utashinai coal mine | 800.000 | | Utashinai | Sumitomo | 1905 | 1971 |
| 12 | Hokutan Mayachi coal mine | 700.000 | 42.971°N 142.071°E | Yūbari | Hokutan | 1905 | 1987 |
| 13 | Hokutan Manji coal mine | 500.000 | 43.134°N 141.992°E | Manji | Hokutan | 1905 | 1976 |
| 14 | Mitsubishi Ōyūbari coal mine | 1000.000 | 43.097°N 142.095°E | Yūbari | Mitsubishi | 1906 | 1973 |
| 15 | Mitsubishi Bibai coal mine | 1600.000 | 43.334°N 141.969°E | Bibai | Mitsubishi | 1913 | 1972 |
| 16 | Mitsubishi Ashibetsu coal mine | 300.000 | | Ashibetsu | Mitsubishi | 1914 | 1964 |
| 17 | Hokutan Miruto coal mine | | | Miruto | Hokutan | 1917 | 1969 |
| 18 | Mitsui Bibai coal mine | 1000.000 | 43.334°N 141.917°E | Bibai | Mitsui | 1918 | 1963 |
| 19 | Moshiri coal mine | | | Akabira | Yūbetsu | 1918 | 1969 |
| 20 | Hokutan Kakuta coal mine | | | Kakuta | Hokutan | 1927 | 1953 |
| 21 | Meiji mining kami Ashibetsu coal mine | 100.000 | | Ashibetsu | Meiji mining | 1935 | 1963 |
| 22 | Hokutan Heiwa coal mine | 1000.000 | 43.017°N 141.991°E | Yūbari | Hokutan | 1937 | 1975 |
| 23 | Toyosato coal mine | | | Akabira | Toyosato Mining Company | 1937 | 1954 |
| 24 | Hokutan Akama coal mine | | 43.553°N 142.048°E | Akabira | Hokutan | 1938 | 1973 |
| 25 | Takane coal mine | 200.000 | | Ashibetsu | Takane | 1938 | 1967 |
| 26 | Mitsui Ashibetsu coal mine | 1700.000 | | Ashibetsu | Mitsui | 1939 | 1992 |
| 27 | Mitsui Oku Naie coal mine | 460.000 | | Naie | Mitsui | 1947 | 1966 |
| 28 | Mitsubishi Minami Ōyūbari coal mine | | 43.029°N 142.090°E | Yūbari | Mitsubishi | 1966 | 1990 |
| 29 | Hokutan Yūbari Shin coal mine | | 42.984°N 142.017°E | Yūbari | Hokutan | 1970 | 1981 |
| 30 | Hokutan Shimisuzawa coal mine | | 43.004°N 142.021°E | Yūbari | Hokutan | | |
| 31 | Yuya coal mine | 200.000 | | Utashinai | Yuya | 19** | 1965 |
