= List of cities in Hokkaido by population =

The following list sorts all cities (including towns and villages) in the Japanese prefecture of Hokkaido with a population of more than 10,000 according to the 2020 Census. As of October 1, 2020, 55 places fulfill this criterion and are listed here. This list refers only to the population of individual cities, towns and villages within their defined limits, which does not include other municipalities or suburban areas within urban agglomerations.

== List ==
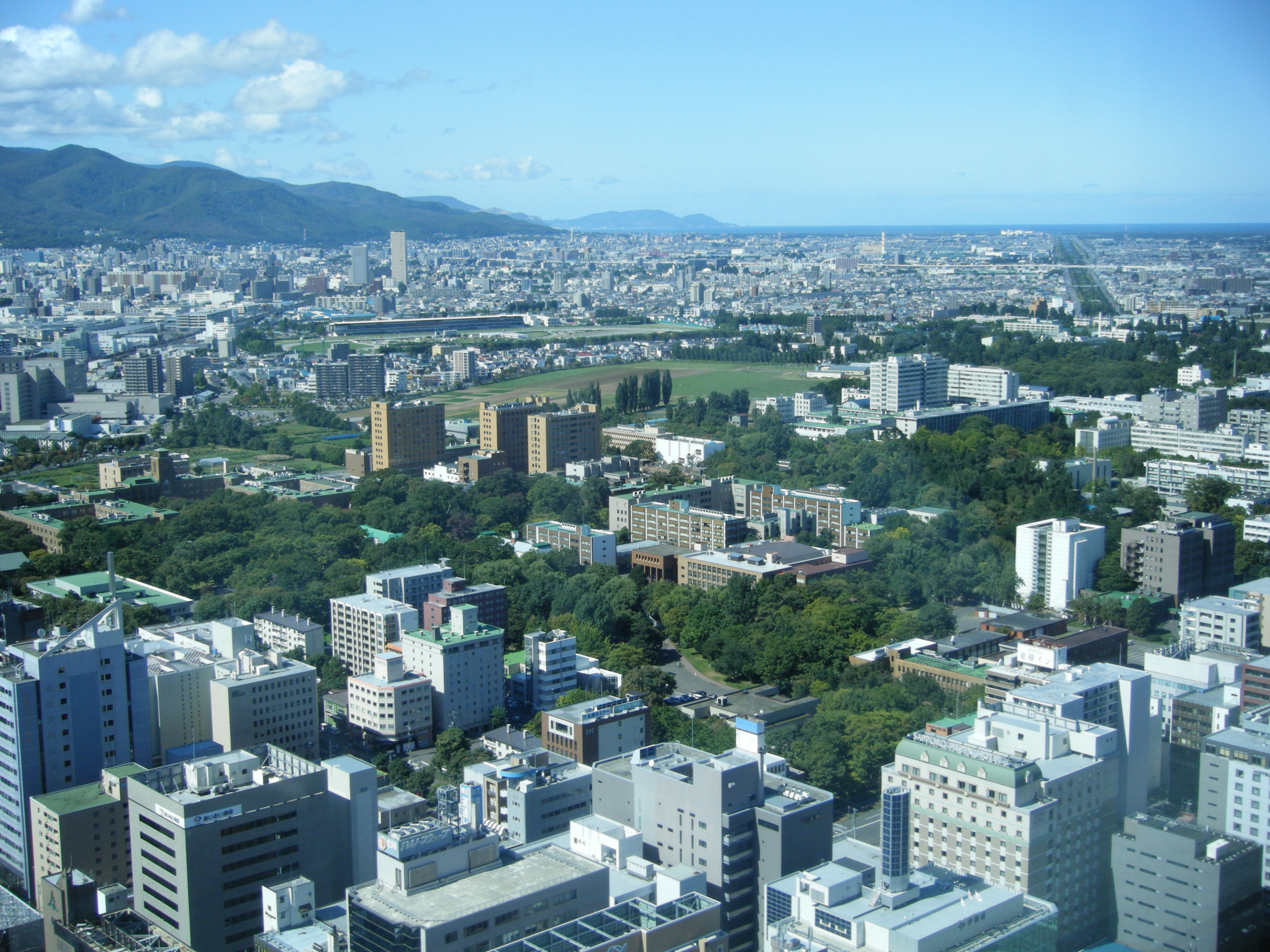
Sapporo

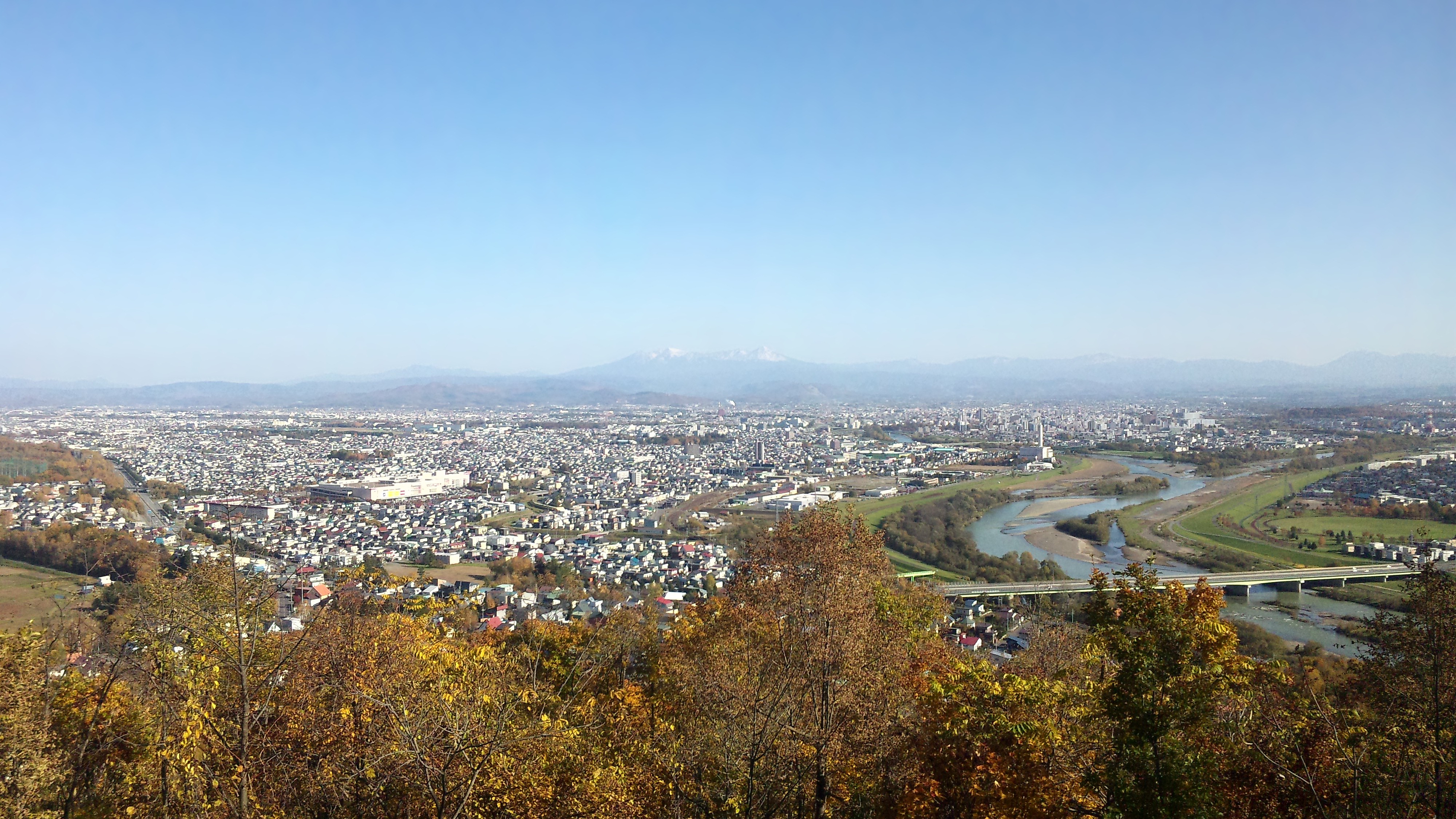
Asahikawa

Hakodate

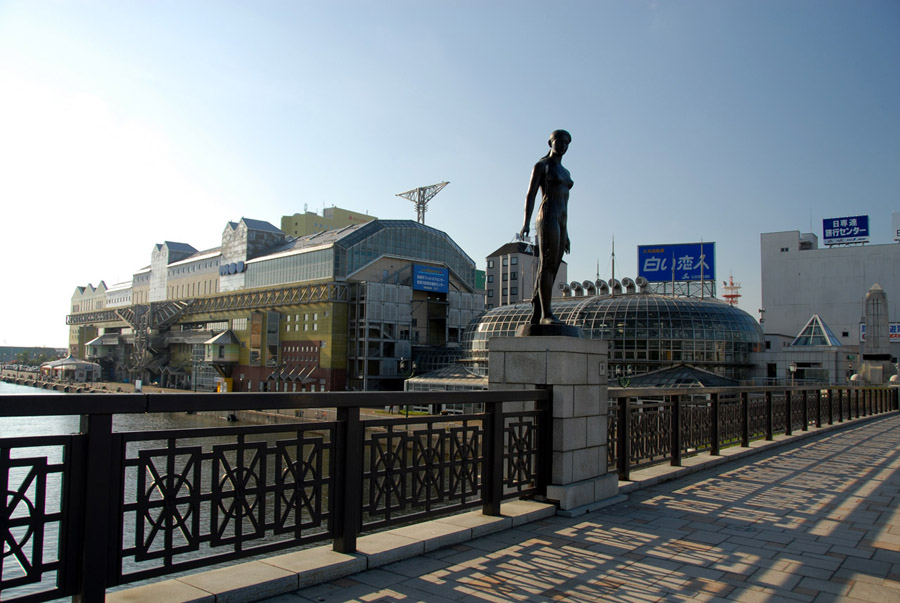
Kushiro

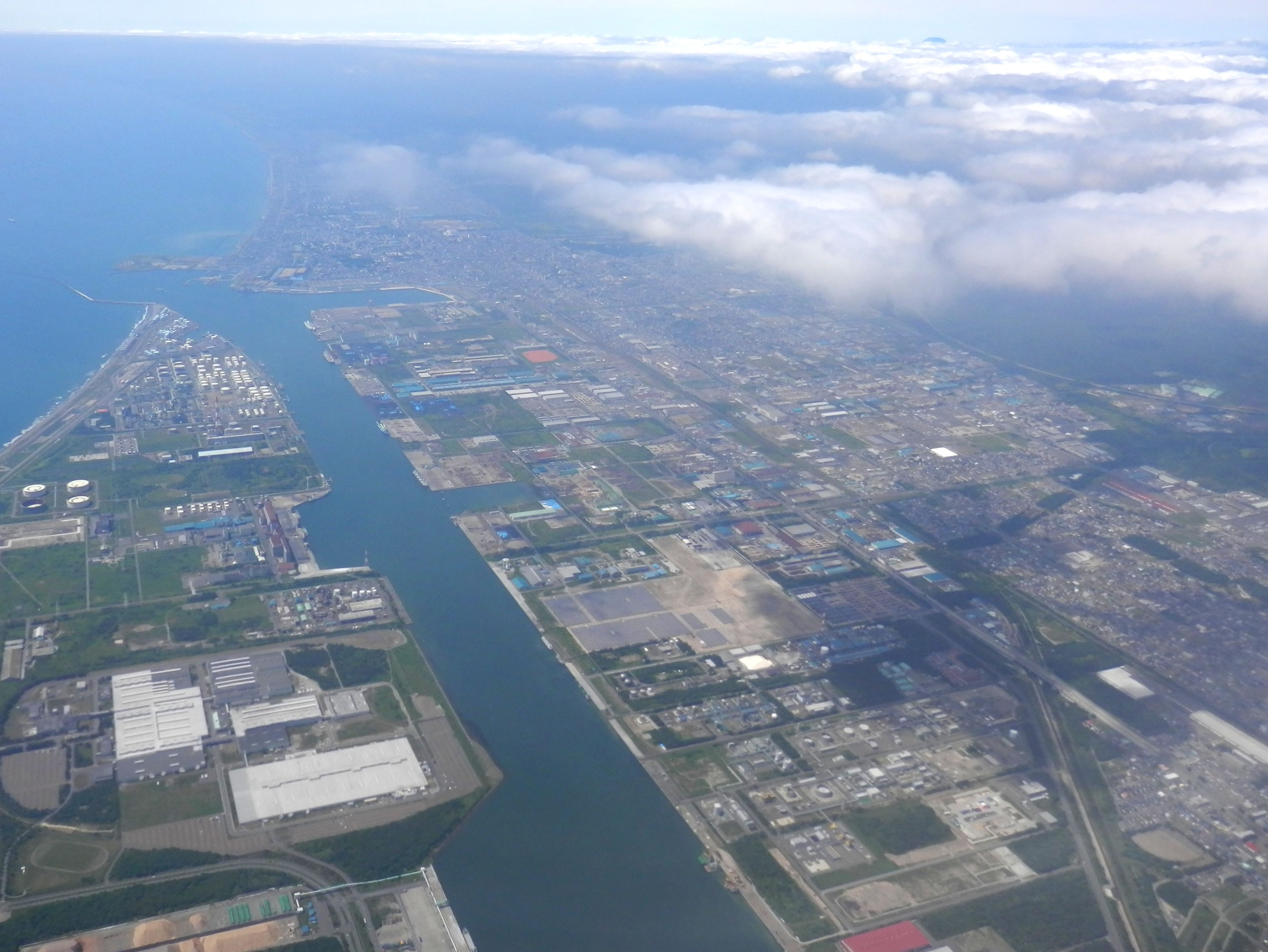
Tomakomai

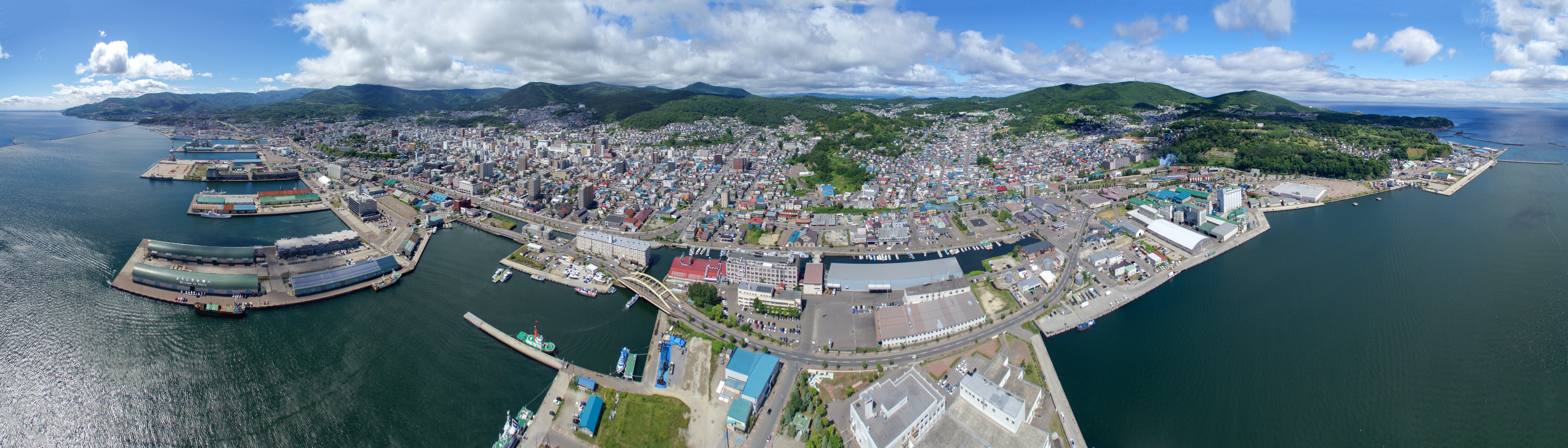
Otaru

The following table lists the 55 cities, towns and villages in Hokkaido with a population of at least 10,000 on October 1, 2020, according to the 2020 Census. The table also gives an overview of the evolution of the population since the 1995 census.

Rank (2020)	Name	Status	2020	2015	2010	2005	2000	1995
1	Sapporo	City	1,975,065	1,952,356	1,913,545	1,880,863	1,822,368	1,757,025
2	Asahikawa	City	329,513	339,605	347,095	355,004	359,536	360,568
3	Hakodate	City	251,271	265,979	279,127	294,264	305,311	318,308
4	Tomakomai	City	170,234	172,737	173,320	172,758	172,086	169,328
5	Obihiro	City	166,690	169,327	168,057	170,580	173,030	171,715
6	Kushiro	City	165,230	174,742	181,169	190,478	201,566	209,680
7	Ebetsu	City	121,145	120,636	123,722	125,601	123,877	115,495
8	Kitami	City	115,608	121,226	125,689	129,365	132,125	131,544
9	Otaru	City	111,422	121,924	131,928	142,161	150,687	157,022
10	Chitose	City	98,019	95,648	93,604	91,437	88,897	84,866
11	Muroran	City	82,457	88,564	94,535	98,372	103,278	109,766
12	Iwamizawa	City	79,424	84,499	90,145	93,677	96,302	97,042
13	Eniwa	City	70,378	69,702	69,384	67,614	65,239	62,351
14	Kitahiroshima	City	58,234	59,064	60,353	60,677	57,731	53,537
15	Ishikari	City	56,934	57,436	59,449	60,104	59,734	57,706
16	Noboribetsu	City	46,447	49,625	51,526	53,135	54,761	56,892
17	Hokuto	City	44,331	46,390	48,032	48,056	46,804	43,177
18	Otofuke	Town	43,613	44,807	45,085	42,452	39,201	37,528
19	Takikawa	City	39,533	41,192	43,170	45,562	46,861	48,425
20	Abashiri	City	35,783	39,077	40,998	42,045	43,395	44,176
21	Wakkanai	City	33,584	36,380	39,595	41,592	43,774	45,754
22	Date	City	32,857	34,995	36,278	37,066	37,139	36,647
23	Nanae	Town	27,707	28,120	28,463	28,424	28,354	27,040
24	Nayoro	City	27,289	29,048	30,591	31,628	33,328	34,664
25	Makubetsu	Town	25,778	26,760	26,547	26,868	26,080	24,240
26	Nemuro	City	24,669	26,917	29,201	31,202	33,150	34,934
27	Nakashibetsu	Town	23,023	23,774	23,982	23,792	23,179	22,326
28	Shinhidaka	Town	21,522	23,231	25,419	27,265	28,438	29,337
29	Mombetsu	City	21,224	23,109	24,750	26,632	28,476	30,137
30	Furano	City	21,156	22,936	24,259	25,076	26,112	26,046
31	Bibai	City	20,430	23,035	26,034	29,083	31,183	33,434
32	Rumoi	City	20,123	22,221	24,457	26,826	28,325	30,060
33	Fukagawa	City	20,062	21,909	23,709	25,838	27,579	28,770
34	Engaru	Town	19,250	20,873	22,265	23,648	24,844	25,769
35	Kushiro	Town	19,115	19,833	20,526	21,855	22,478	21,986
36	Bihoro	Town	18,705	20,296	21,575	22,819	23,905	24,716
37	Memuro	Town	18,078	18,484	18,905	18,300	17,586	16,604
38	Yoichi	Town	18,012	19,607	21,258	22,734	23,685	24,485
39	Shibetsu	City	17,872	19,914	21,787	23,411	24,991	26,403
40	Sunagawa	City	16,506	17,694	19,056	20,068	21,072	21,722
41	Shiraoi	Town	16,225	17,740	19,376	20,748	21,662	22,414
42	Tōbetsu	Town	15,921	17,278	18,766	19,982	20,778	19,672
43	Yakumo	Town	15,844	17,252	18,896	20,131	21,438	22,315
44	Kutchan	Town	15,137	15,018	15,568	16,176	16,184	17,078
45	Betsukai	Town	14,382	15,273	15,855	16,460	16,910	17,549
46	Mori	Town	14,343	15,946	17,859	19,149	20,233	21,006
47	Ashibetsu	City	12,578	14,676	16,628	18,899	21,026	22,931
48	Urakawa	Town	12,083	13,075	14,389	15,698	16,634	17,186
49	Iwanai	Town	11,654	13,042	14,451	15,744	16,726	17,895
50	Shari	Town	11,443	12,231	13,045	13,431	14,066	14,634
51	Hidaka	Town	11,289	12,378	13,615	14,730	15,783	16,556
52	Kuriyama	Town	11,262	12,344	13,340	14,352	14,847	15,604
53	Kamifurano	Town	10,353	10,826	11,545	12,352	12,809	12,881
54	Naganuma	Town	10,300	11,076	11,691	12,401	12,452	12,293
55	Higashikagura	Town	10,141	10,233	9,292	9,194	8,127	7,676

== Cities with population under 10,000 ==
Name	Status	2020	2015	2010	2005	2000	1995
Akabira	City	9,707	11,105	12,637	14,401	15,753	17,351
Mikasa	City	8,038	9,076	10,221	11,927	13,561	15,116
Yūbari	City	7,341	8,843	10,922	13,001	14,791	17,116
Utashinai	City	2,989	3,585	4,387	5,221	5,941	6,867
