= Hiragishi Station =

Hiragishi Station may refer to:

- Hiragishi Station (JR Hokkaido), in Akabira, Hokkaido, Japan
- Hiragishi Station (Sapporo Municipal Subway), in Sapporo, Hokkaido, Japan
