= Canadian World =

Former theme park in Ashibetsu, Japan

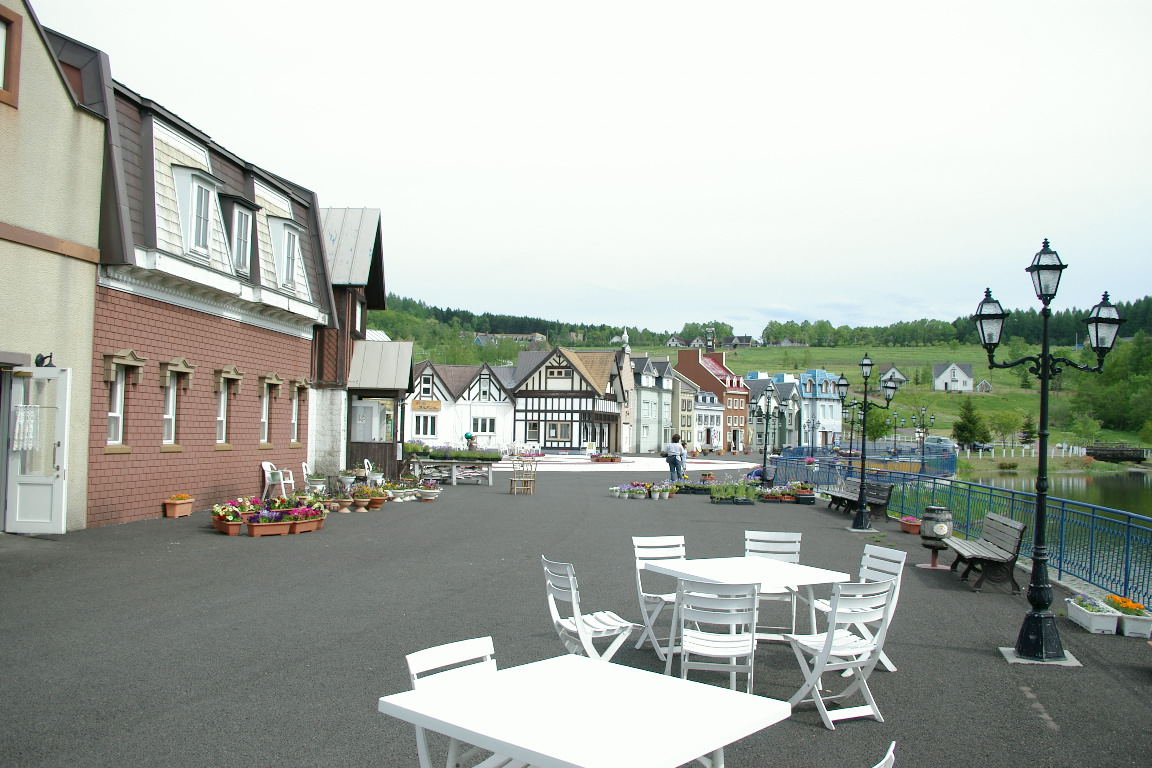
- Canadian World in 2004, when it was still actively operating as a theme park
- Interactive map of Canadian World
- Location: Ashibetsu, Hokkaido, Japan
- Coordinates: 43°33′58″N 142°14′21″E
- Operator: Canadian World Promotion Association
- Open: July 29, 1990
- Website: www.canadianneworld.com

Canadian World (Japanese: カナディアンワールド), or Canadian World Park (カナディアンワールド公園), is a privately-run park and former theme park in Ashibetsu, Hokkaido, Japan. It was a failed business venture intended to boost tourism in Ashibetsu, a former coal mining town. The park contains various replicas of landmarks in the Canadian province of Prince Edward Island (PEI), notably buildings featured in the film adaptation of the Canadian novel Anne of Green Gables, which is popular in Japan due to its inclusion in the Japanese curriculum. A replica of the fictional community of Avonlea, including the Green Gables farmhouse, was its main attraction.Ashibetsu and Charlottetown, the capital of PEI, are also sister cities.
