= Ashibetsu Station =

Railway station in Ashibetsu, Hokkaido, Japan

Ashibetsu Station 芦別駅
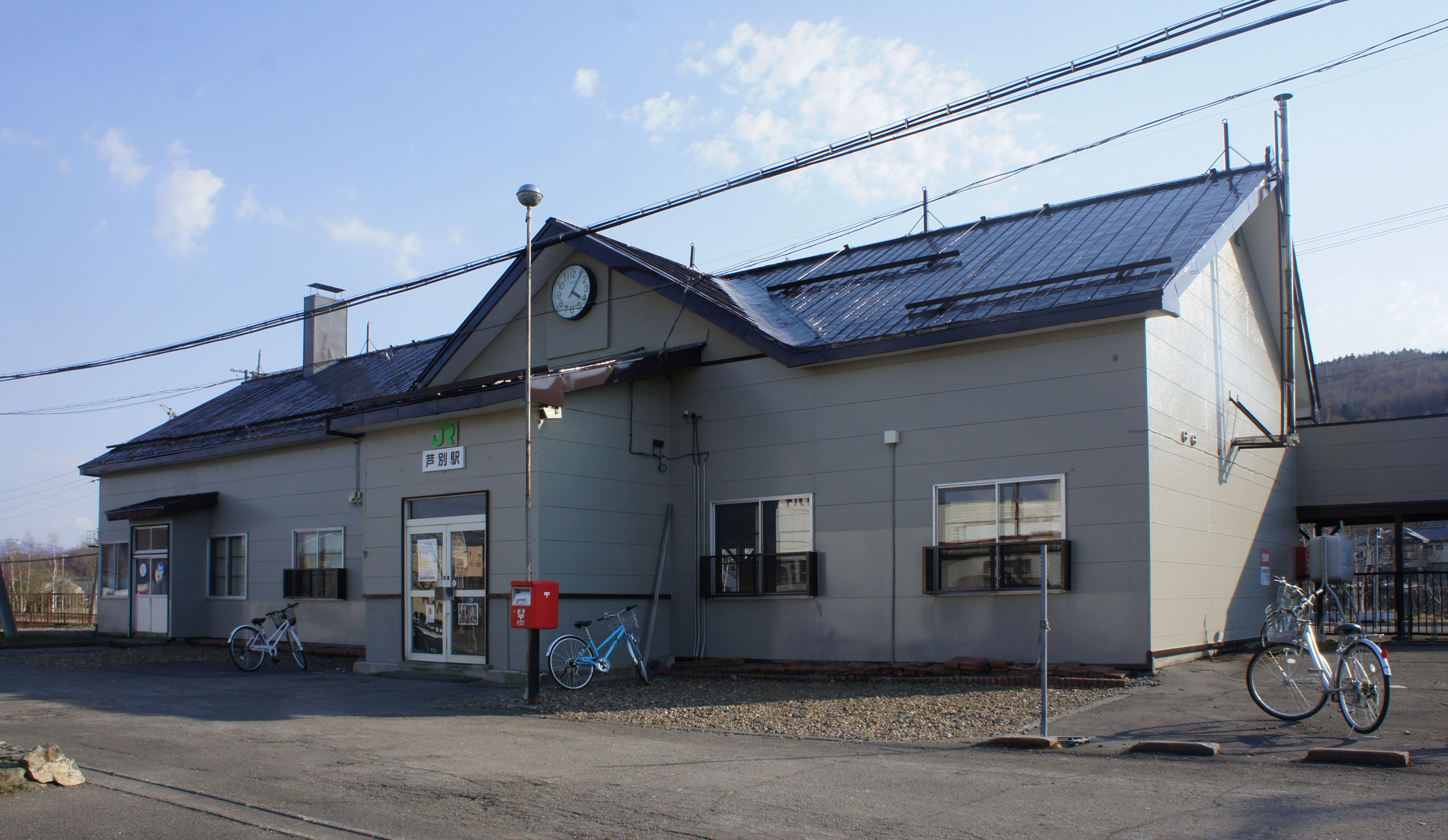

General information
- Location: Ashibetsu, Hokkaidō; Japan
- Coordinates: 43.516596°N 142.184306°E
- Operator: JR Hokkaido
- Line: Nemuro Main Line

Services
Preceding station	JR Hokkaido	Following station
Hiragishi towards Takikawa	Nemuro Main Line Local	Kami-Ashibetsu towards Nemuro
Location

Ashibetsu Station (芦別駅, Ashibetsu-eki) is a railway station on the Nemuro Main Line of JR Hokkaido located in Ashibetsu, Hokkaidō, Japan. The station opened on November 10, 1913.

== See also ==
- List of railway lines in Japan
