= Akabira Station =

Railway station in Akabira, Hokkaido, Japan

Akabira Station 赤平駅
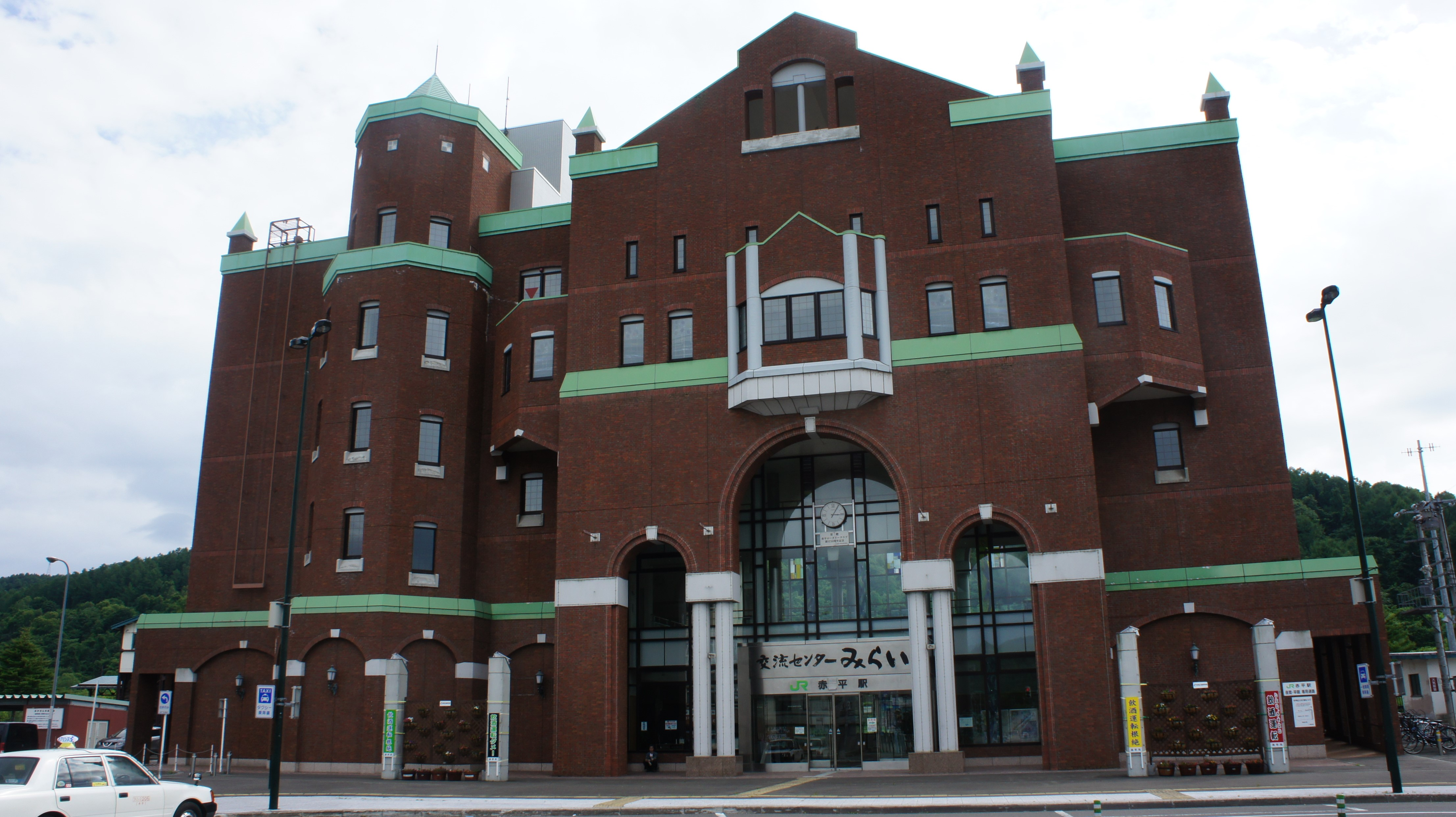
- Station building in 2018

General information
- Location: Izumachi, Akabira, Hokkaidō; Japan
- Coordinates: 43°33′18.57″N 142°2′55.2″E
- Operator: JR Hokkaido
- Line: Nemuro Main Line
- Platforms: 1 side, 1 Island platform
- Tracks: 3

Construction
- Structure type: At-grade
- Accessible: No

Other information
- Status: Unstaffed
- Station code: T23
- Website: Official website

History
- Opened: 10 November 1913

Services
| Preceding station | JR Hokkaido | Following station |
|---|---|---|
| Takikawa Terminus | Nemuro Main Line Local | Moshiri towards Nemuro |
Location

Akabira Station (赤平駅, Akabira-eki) is a railway station on the Nemuro Main Line of JR Hokkaido located in Akabira, Hokkaidō, Japan. The station opened on 10 November 1913.

== Lines ==
- Hokkaido Railway Company
  - Nemuro Main Line Station T23

== History ==
Akabira Station opened on 10 November 1913.

With the privatization of the Japan National Railway (JNR) on 1 April 1987, the station came under the aegis of the Hokkaido Railway Company (JR Hokkaido).

The Midori no Madoguchi ticketing office at this station closed on 25 March 2016.

== Passenger statistics ==
In fiscal 2022, the station was used by an average of 78 passengers daily (boarding passengers only).
