= Moshiri Station =

Railway station in Akabira, Hokkaido, Japan

Moshiri Station 茂尻駅
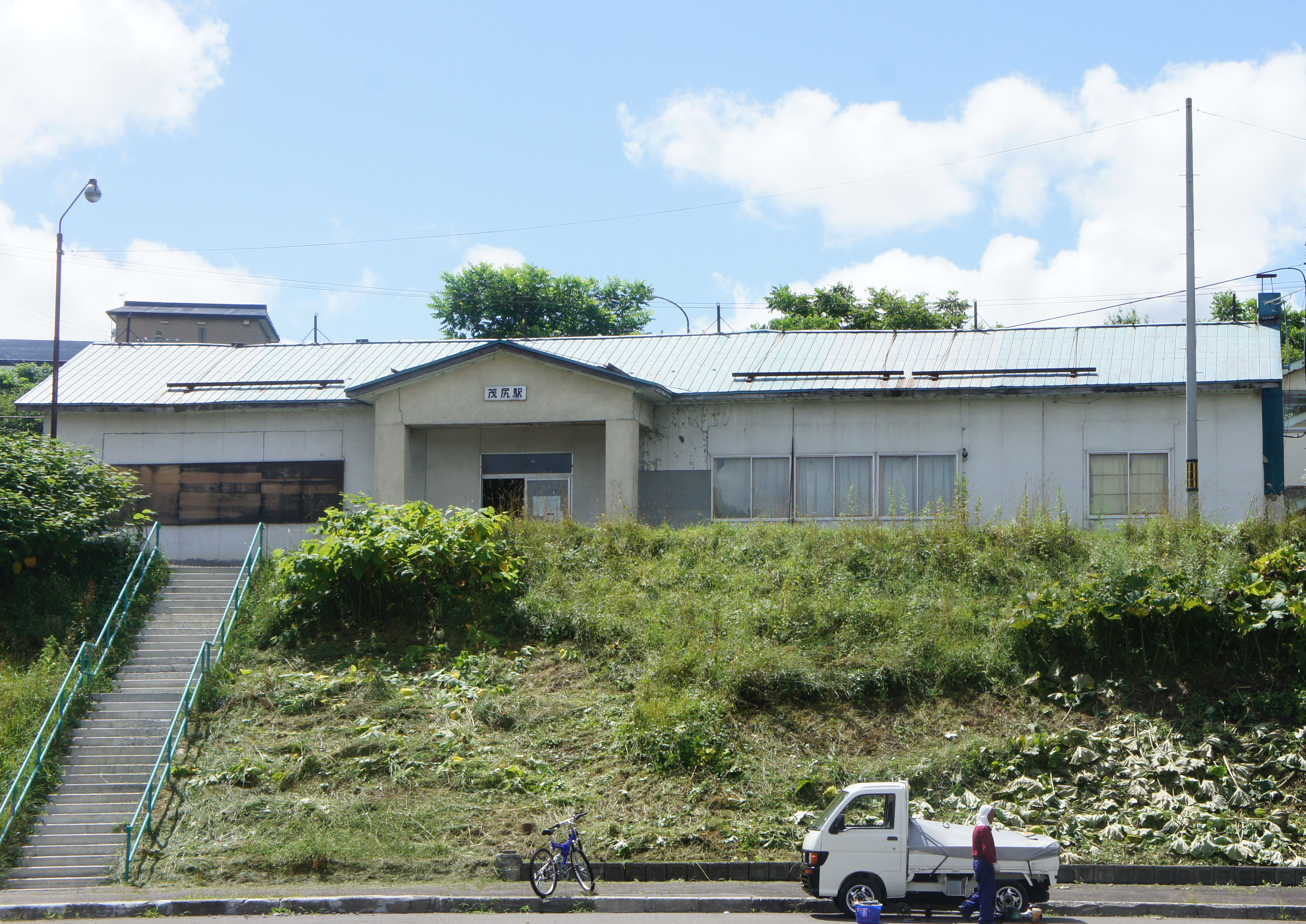

General information
- Location: Akabira, Hokkaidō; Japan
- Coordinates: 43.537096°N 142.082222°E
- Operator: JR Hokkaido
- Line: Nemuro Main Line

Services
Preceding station	JR Hokkaido	Following station
Akabira towards Takikawa	Nemuro Main Line Local	Hiragishi towards Nemuro
Location

Moshiri Station (茂尻駅, Moshiri-eki) is an unstaffed railway station in Akabira, Hokkaidō, Japan. It is served by local and rapid trains running on the Furano to Takikawa section of JR Hokkaido's Nemuro Main Line. The station code is T24.

First opened as a coal-handling facility on 28 December 1918, Moshiri became a full passenger station on 15 July 1926. The facilities today consist of a double-sided island platform connected by a pedestrian overbridge to a station building located on the northern side of the line.
