= Kami-Ashibetsu Station =

Railway station in Ashibetsu, Hokkaido, Japan

Kami-Ashibetsu Station 上芦別駅
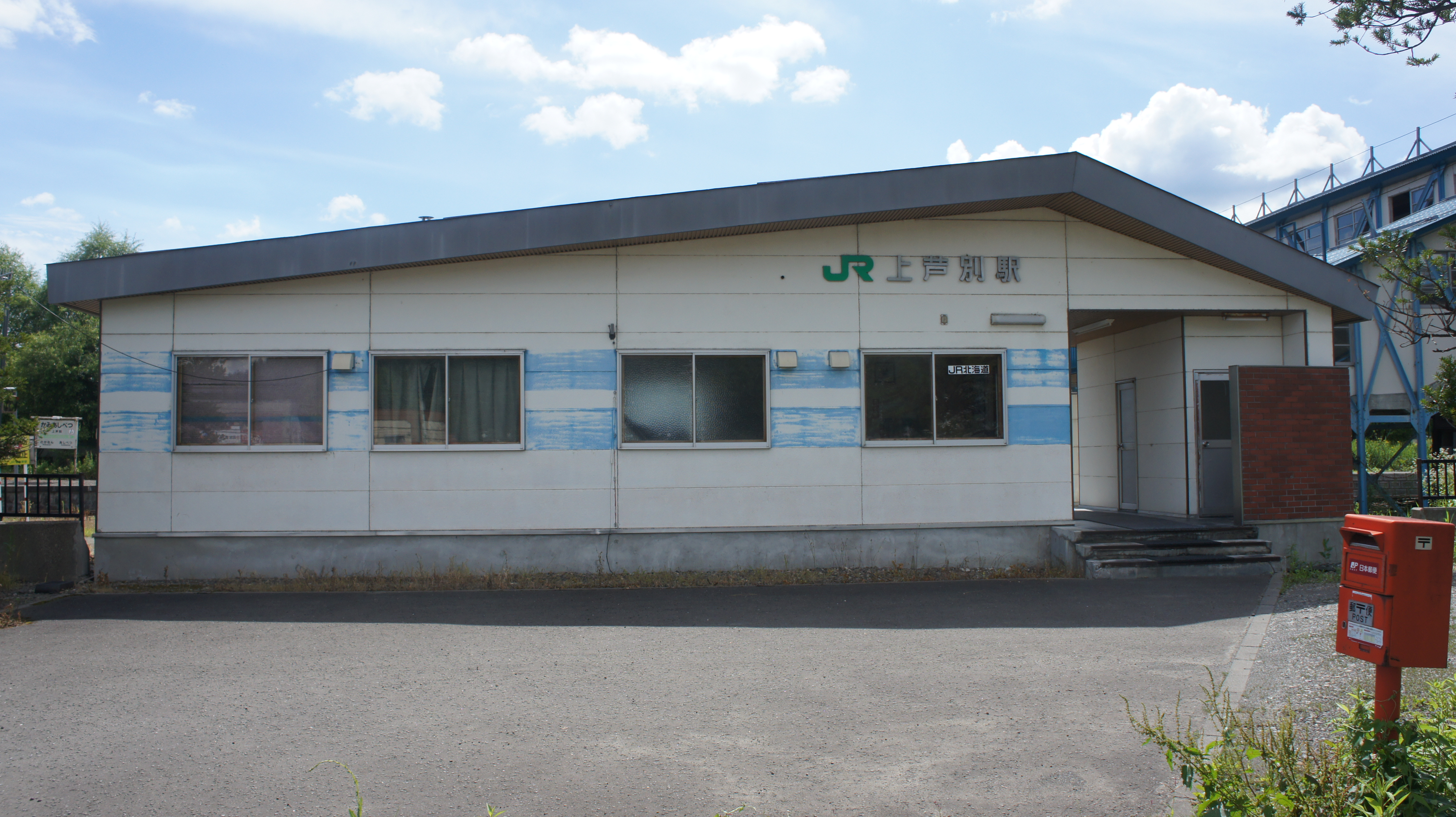

General information
- Location: Ashibetsu, Hokkaidō; Japan
- Coordinates: 43.488519°N 142.211056°E
- Operator: JR Hokkaido
- Line: Nemuro Main Line

Services
Preceding station	JR Hokkaido	Following station
Ashibetsu towards Takikawa	Nemuro Main Line Local	Nokanan towards Nemuro
Location

Kami-Ashibetsu Station (上芦別駅, Kami-Ashibetsu-eki) is a railway station on the Nemuro Main Line of JR Hokkaido located in Ashibetsu, Hokkaidō, Japan. The station opened on January 16, 1920.
