= Nokanan Station =

Railway station in Ashibetsu, Hokkaido, Japan

Nokanan Station 野花南駅
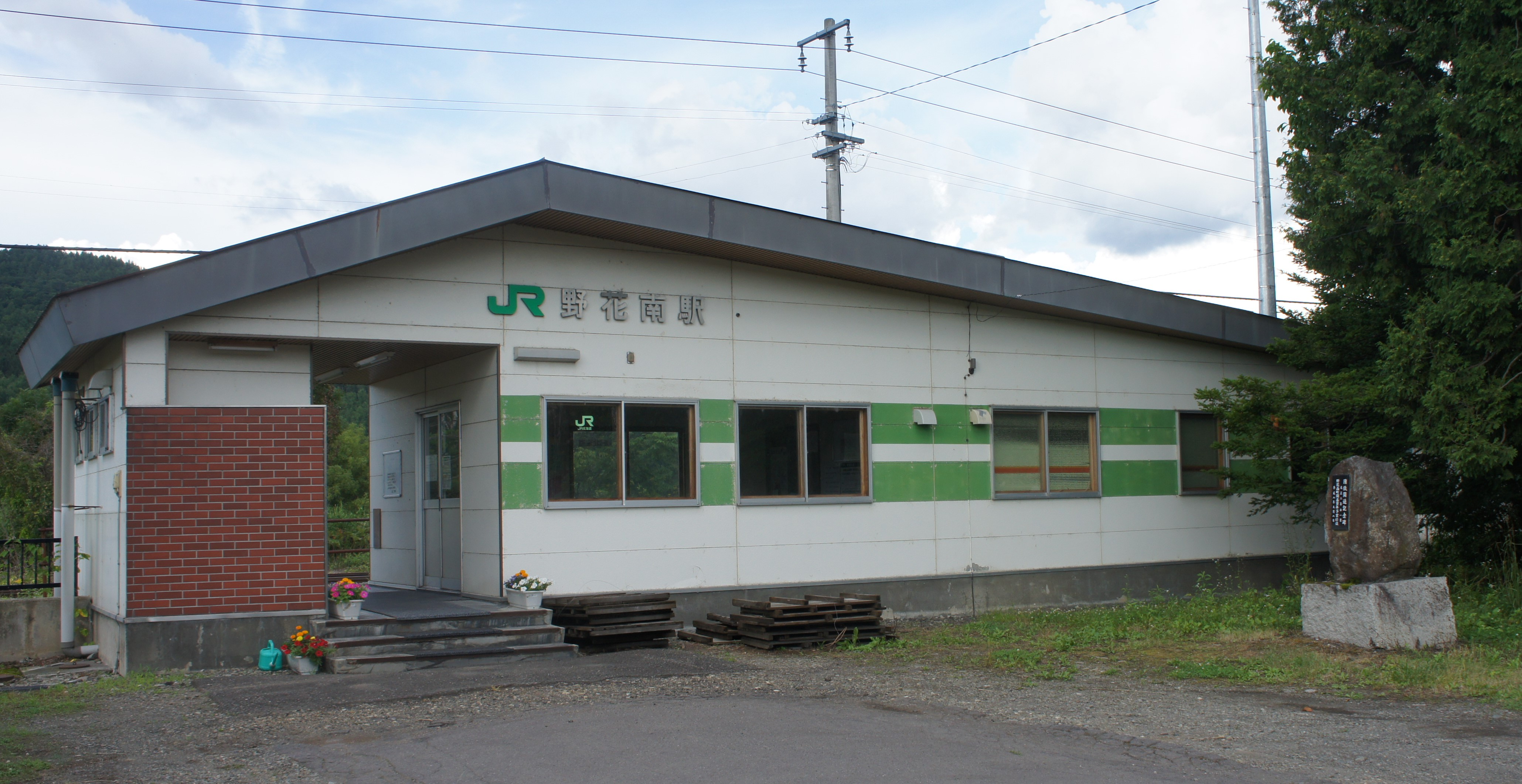

General information
- Location: Ashibetsu, Hokkaidō; Japan
- Coordinates: 43.47445°N 142.26175°E
- Operator: JR Hokkaido
- Line: Nemuro Main Line

Services
Preceding station	JR Hokkaido	Following station
Kami-Ashibetsu towards Takikawa	Nemuro Main Line Local	Furano towards Nemuro
Location

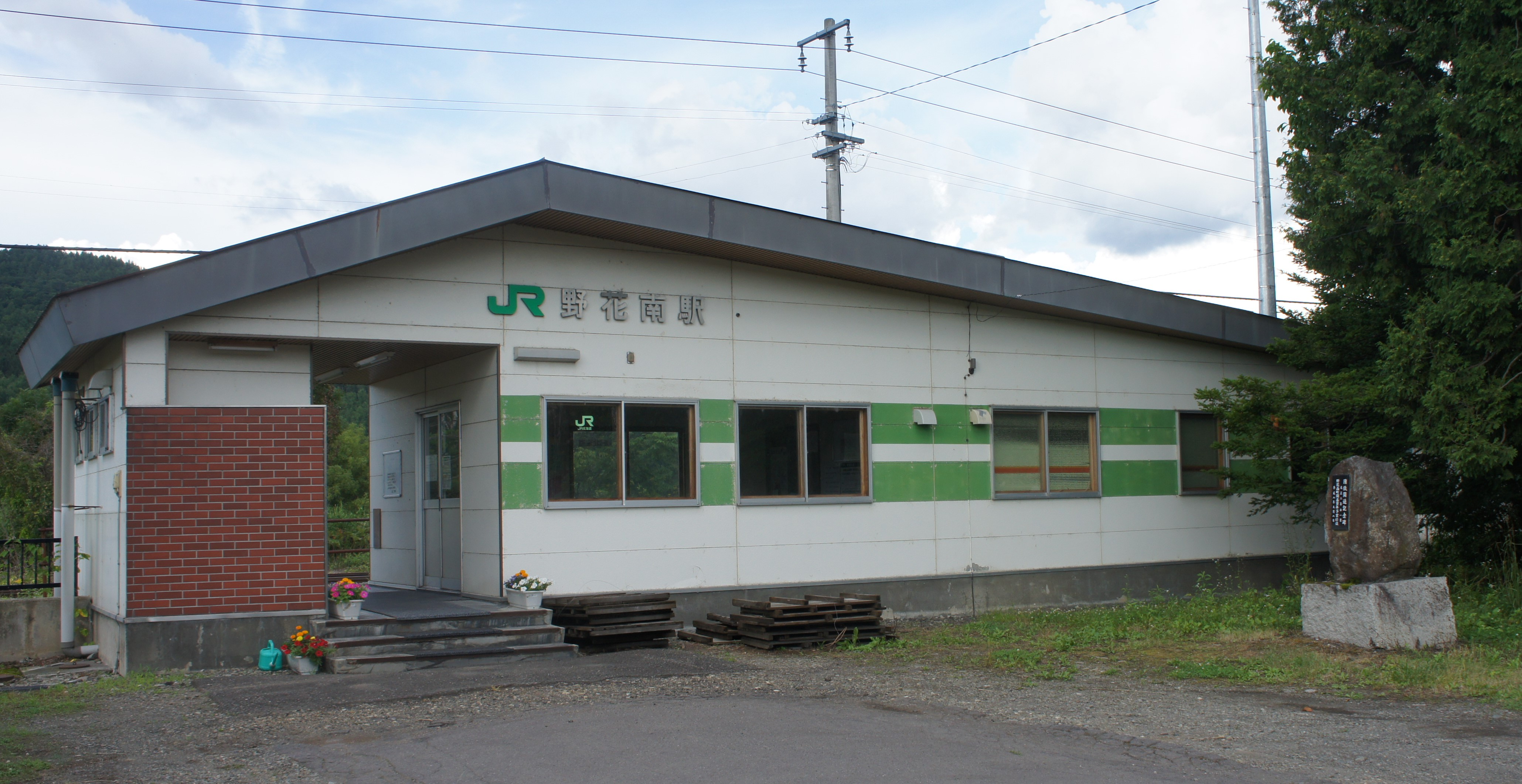
Train station building

Nokanan Station (野花南駅, Nokanan-eki) is a railway station on the Nemuro Main Line of JR Hokkaido located in Ashibetsu, Hokkaidō, Japan. The station opened on November 10, 1913. It was formerly used as a passing station. There is a photo exhibit inside the station's building of an abandoned station located nearby, Takisato Station.
