= Hiragishi Station (JR Hokkaido) =

Railway station in Akabira, Hokkaido, Japan

Hiragishi Station 平岸駅
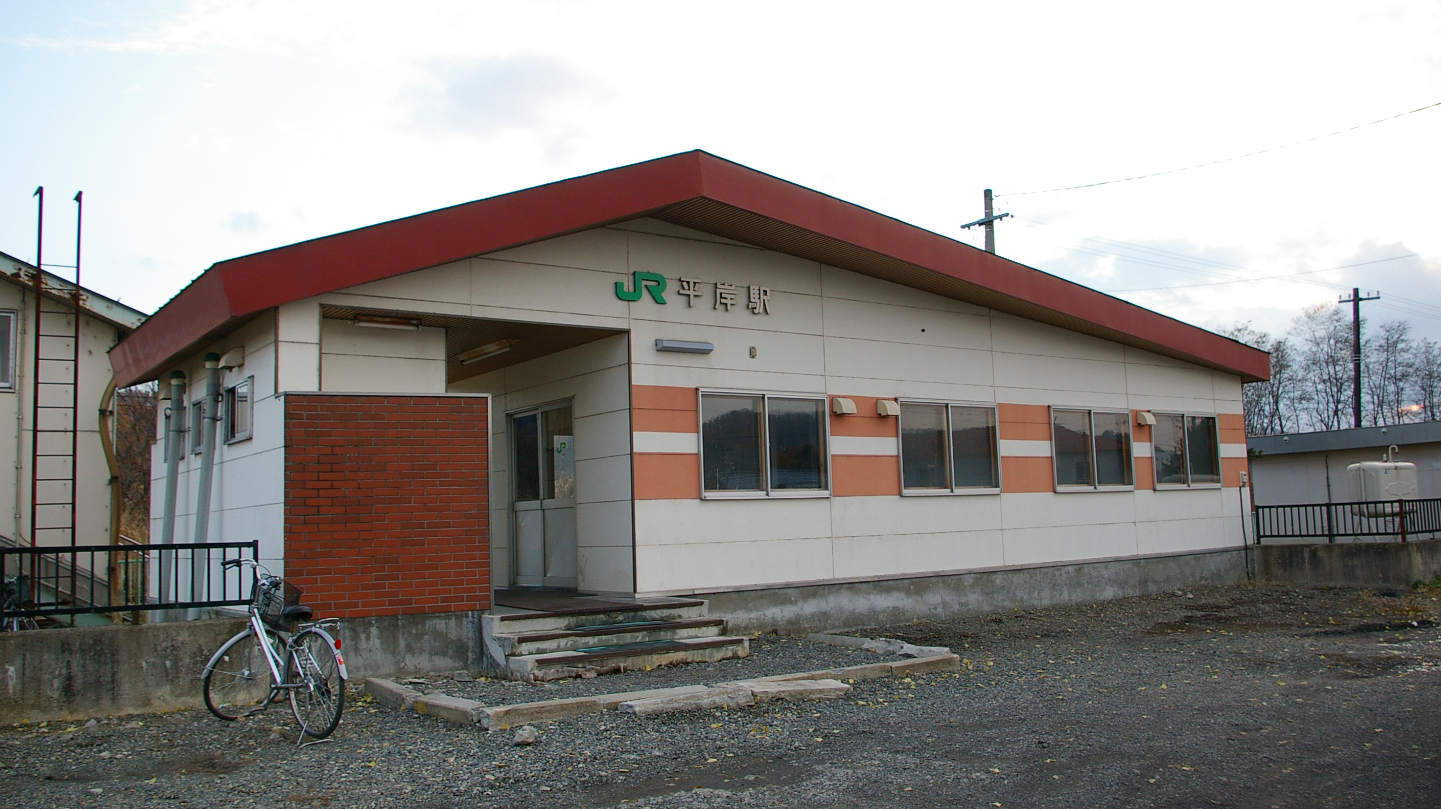
- Station building in November 2006

General information
- Location: Urahoro, Tokachi District, Hokkaidō; Japan
- Coordinates: 43.5414°N 142.1239°E
- Operator: Hokkaido Railway Company
- Line: Nemuro Main Line
- Platforms: 2 side platforms
- Tracks: 2

Construction
- Structure type: At-grade
- Accessible: No

Other information
- Status: Unstaffed
- Station code: T25
- Website: Official website

History
- Opened: 10 November 1913

Services
Preceding station	JR Hokkaido	Following station
Moshiri towards Takikawa	Nemuro Main Line Local	Ashibetsu towards Nemuro
Location

Hiragishi Station (平岸駅, Hiragishi-eki) is a railway station on the Nemuro Main Line of JR Hokkaido located in Akabira, Hokkaidō, Japan.

== Lines ==
- Hokkaido Railway Company
  - Nemuro Main Line Station T25

== History ==
Hiragishi Station opened on 10 November 1913.

With the privatization of the Japan National Railway (JNR) on 1 April 1987, the station came under the aegis of the Hokkaido Railway Company (JR Hokkaido).
