= Hokutan Horonai coal mine =

Former coal mine in Sorachi, Hokkaido

Coordinates: 43.221°N 141.909°E

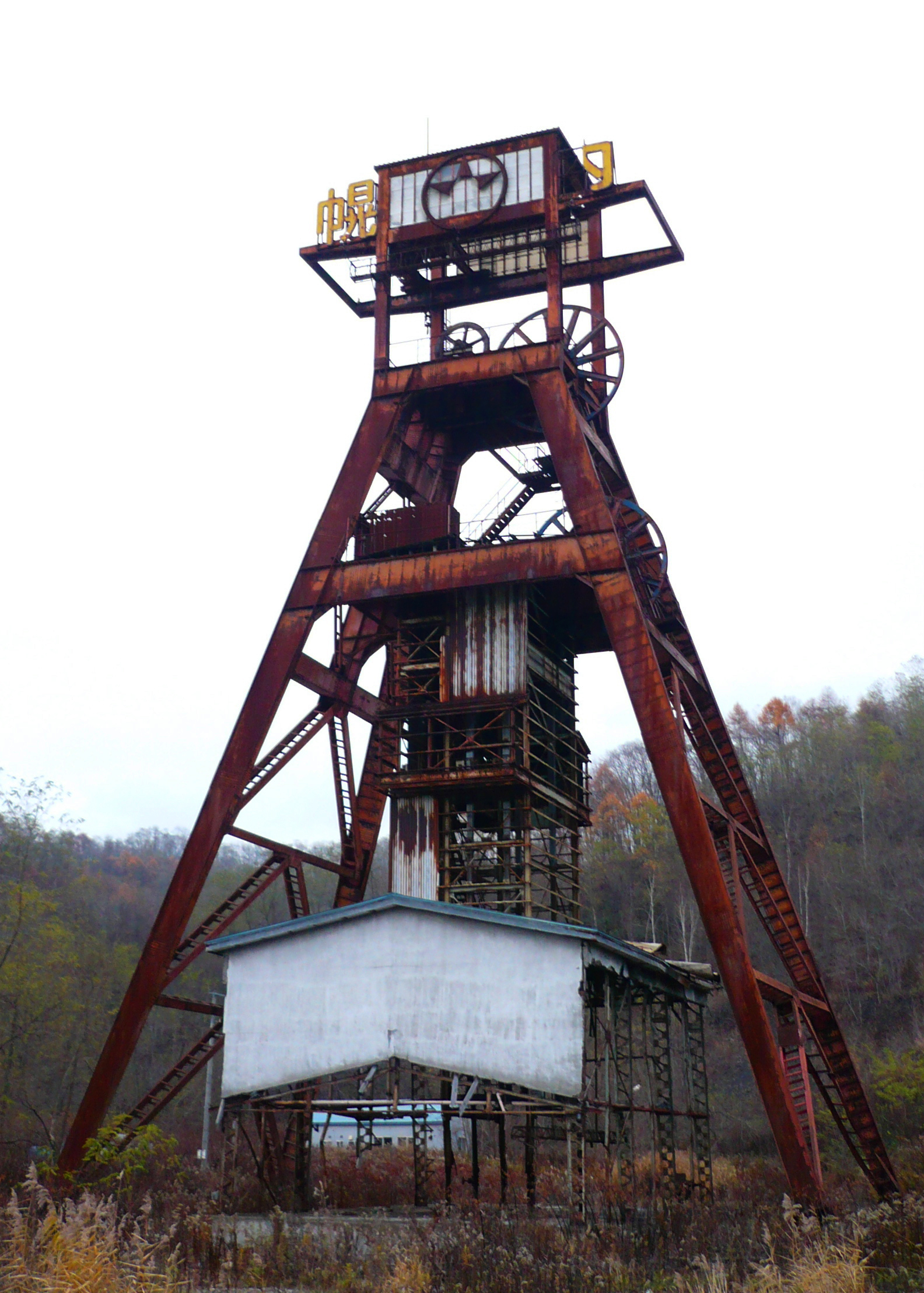
The in 1966-built Horonai headgear (幌内立坑櫓) of the Horonai mine

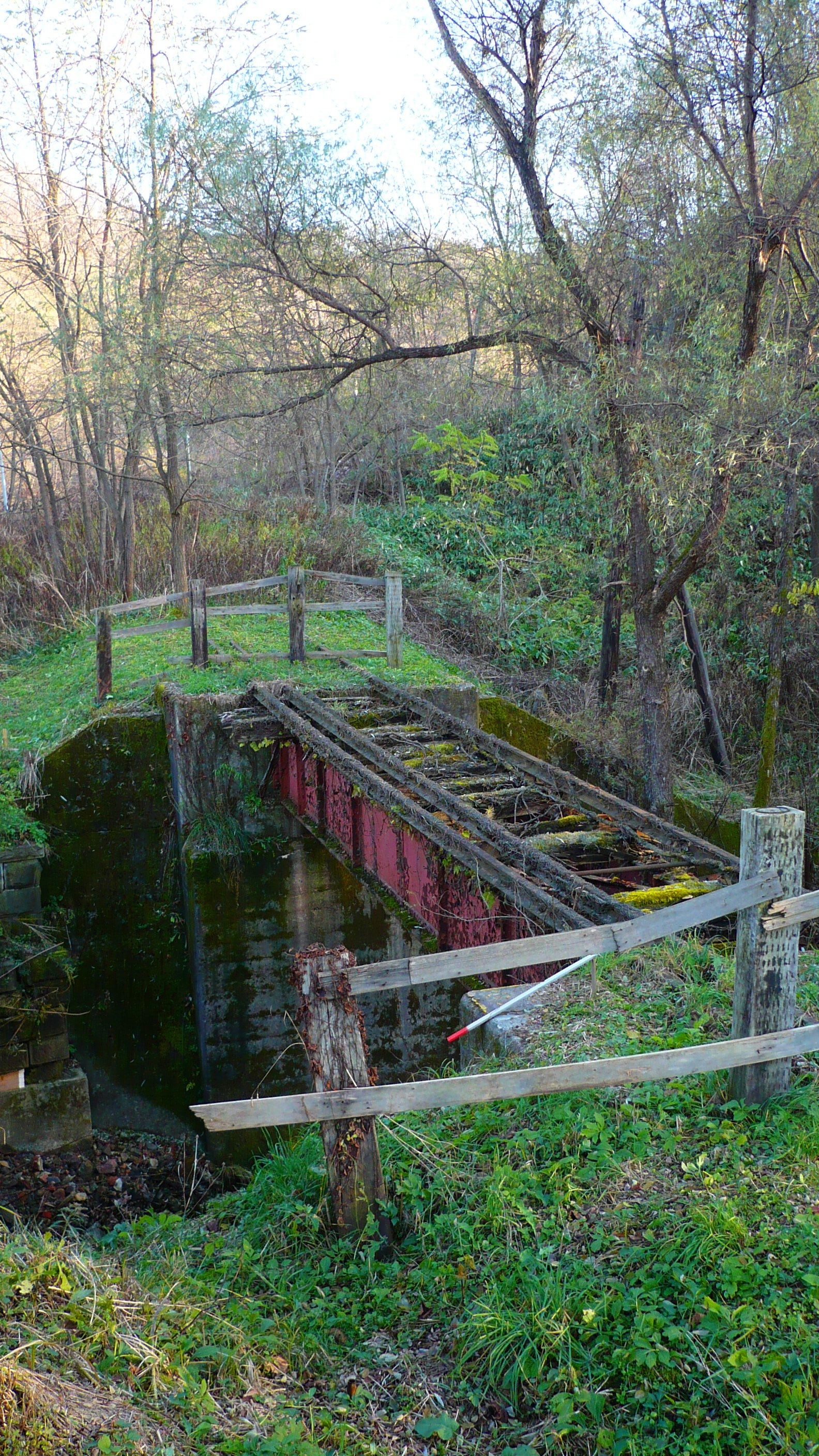
The third railway of Japan (1882), the railway of Horonai (官営幌内鉄道, Kan'ei Horonai Tetsudō)

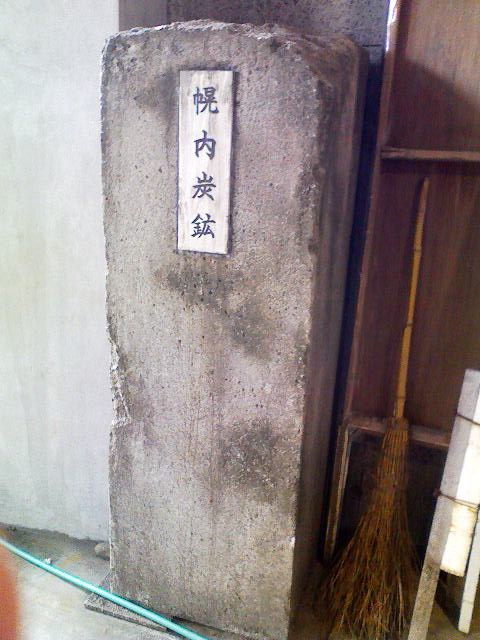
Gatepost of the Hokutan Horonai mine

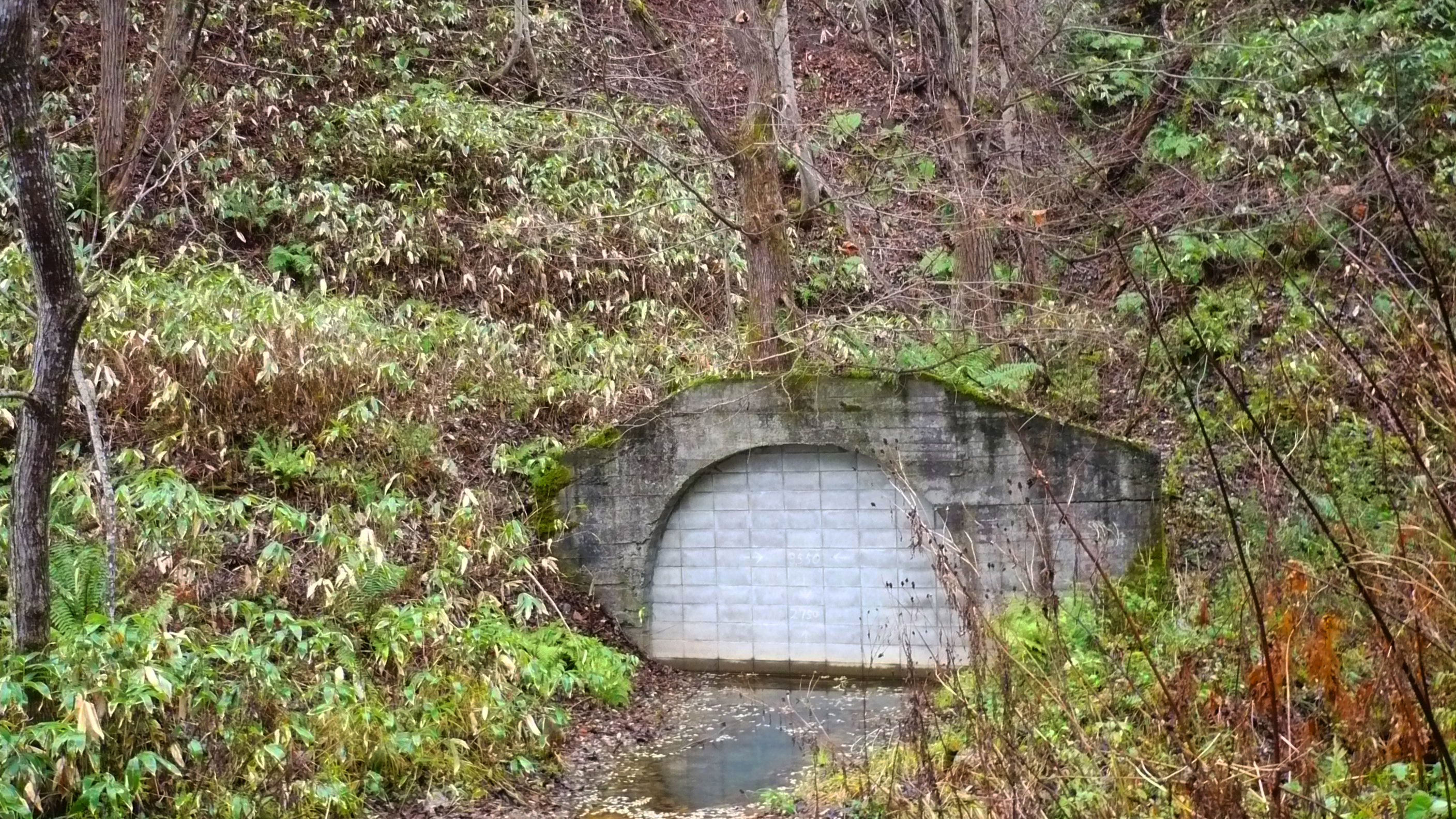
The Daikōdō (大抗道), the first adit of the Horonai mine (1879) (also known as the Otowakõ (音羽坑) )

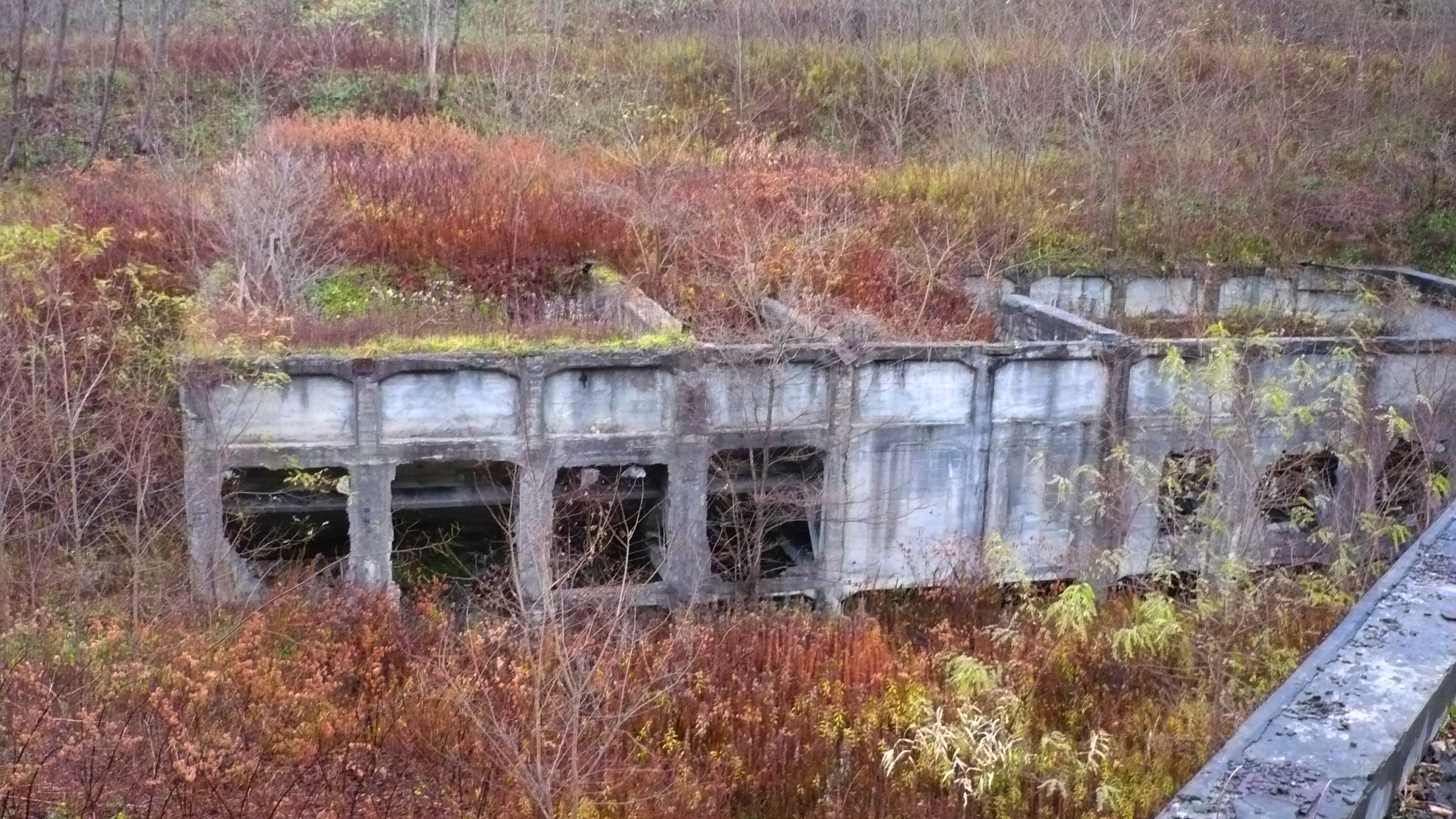
The coal silo in the Landscape Park of the Horonai coal mine (幌内炭鉱景観公園, Horonai Tankō Keikan Kōen)

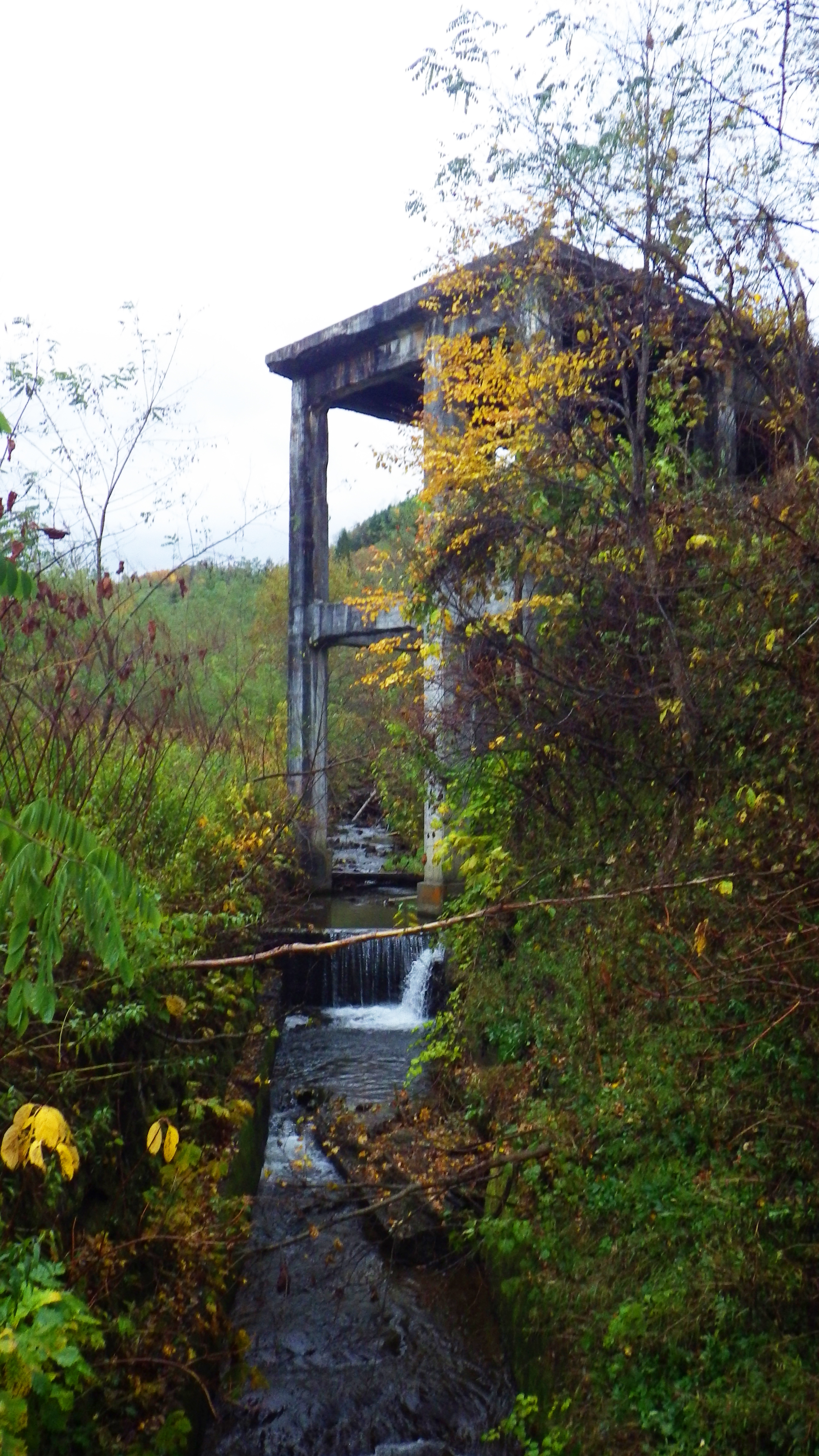
The hoisting machine of the Tokiwakō-adits (常磐坑) of the Hokutan Horonai mine

The Horonai coal mine (幌内炭鉱, , Horonai tankō) is the oldest mine of the Ishikari coalfield of the Sorachi (Mikasa) mining region on the Japanese island of Hokkaido. Since its privatisation in 1889, the mine came under the management of the Hokutan company until its closure in 1989.

== Beginning ==
In 1868, carpenter Kimura Kichitarō (木村 吉太郎) discovered coal in Horonai, Mikasa (三 笠). However, it took another 6 years before Chōjūrō Hayakawa a citizen of Sapporo, delivered the first coal to the colonization commission (開拓使, Kaitakushi). The local government took action, and the mining engineers Benjamin Smith Lyman and Takeaki Enomoto welded an investigation. Their findings were satisfactory, and the Meiji government decided to build in Horonai the first coal mine of the Ishikari coal basin. The construction of the mine was led by the American engineer L.C.E. Goujot and his disciple Edward Parry. The first adit, the Daikōdō (大抗道, big adit) was opened in 1879. It was followed by the opening of the Takinosawa adit (瀧ノ沢抗) and Honsawa adit (本沢抗) in 1882, which meant the start of the coal production.

In the year 1882, the railway of Horonai was completed (官営幌内鉄道, Kan'ei Horonai Tetsudō), the third railway of the Japanese empire connecting the mine with the Otaru harbor. Also, the government decided to build the prison of sorachi in Mikasa (空知監獄). Thus the problem of overcrowded prisons as well as the problem of insufficient labour power in the mine were solved. Between 1883 and 1894, this prison provided an average of 720 prison miners a year, making up 80 percent of the total workforce.

Table 1 : Prison Labour at the Hokutan Horonai Coal Mine
Year	Prisoners	Miners	Year	Prisoners	Miners	Year	Prisoners	Miners
1883	250	228	1887	791	/	1891	1.132	/
1884	400	202	1888	605	/	1892	920	/
1885	/	/	1889	630	276	1893	874	162
1886	809	/	1890	1.043	183	1894	± 500	± 539

== Privatisation ==
In 1889, the Meiji government sold off the mine and its railways to, Hori Motoi, who founded the Hokkaido Colliery and Railway Company (北海道炭礦鉄道会社 Hokkaidō Tankō Tetsudō Kaisha), abbreviated as Hokutan. Due to the tensions with Russia, Japan nationalised its railways again in 1906, and the company name changed into the Hokkaidō Coal and Steamship Company. In 1913, after disappointing investments in its steel plant, in Muroran, the conglomerate Mitsui bought itself into the management of Hokutan.

Along with the property, Hokutan also bought the rights for prison labor, so the miners mostly consisted of prisoners. It continued until 1894, when the Meiji government under the pressure of the public opinion led by Protestant prison director Ōinoue Terusaki (1848-1912), decided on the abolition of prison labour. The prisoners were substituted by other forms of recruitment as that of subcontractors (飯場制度, hanbaseidō) and direct recruitment as well as a thorough mechanization. In 1938, the Tokiwakō (常磐坑), two inclined shafts were mined. Along these the coal was transported towards the coal preparation plant. In 1952, these shafts were equipped with conveyor belts. When in 1967, the Horonai mine merged with the Shin-Horonai mine (新幌内炭鉱, shin Horonai tankō), these belts transported coal from a depth of 520 meters, over a distance of 2.720 meters towards the plant. The merged Hokutan Horonai mine was equipped with two modern deep shafts and used drum cutters since 1968, which made it one of the most modern mines of Japan.

Tabel 2 : The Shafts of the Hokutan Horonai Coal Mine
Excavation	Closure	Shaft Name	Translation	Shaft Type	Origin
<1955	<1965	第一風井	1st ventilation pit	Inclined	Shin-Horonai
<1955	<1967	本御	Main Shaft	Inclined	Shin-Horonai
<1955	<1967	連御	Auxiliary Shaft	Inclined	Shin-Horonai
<1955	<1975	第二風井	2nd ventilation pit	Inclined	Shin-Horonai
<1955	<1967	第三風井	3rd ventilation pit	Inclined	Shin-Horonai
<1955	<1967	第三風井立坑	3rd ventilation pit	Pit	Shin-Horonai
1882	<1985	瀧ノ沢抗	Takinosawakō	Adit	Horonai
1882	<1985	本沢抗	Honsawakō	Adit	Horonai
1879	<1965	音羽坑 (大抗道)	Otowakō (Daikōdō)	Adit	Horonai
1896	<1965	養老立坑	Yōrō Tatekō	Pit	Horonai
1910	<1985	那智抗	Nachikō	Inclined	Horonai
1917	<1985	布引立坑	Nunobiki Tatekō	Pit	Horonai
1917	<1985	布引立坑	Nunobiki Tatekō	Pit	Horonai
1918	<1985	白糸抗	Shiraitokō	Inclined	Horonai
1938	1989	常磐坑 (本御)	Tokiwakō (Main shaft)	Inclined	Horonai
1938	1989	常磐坑 (連御)	Tokiwakō (Secondary shaft)	Inclined	Horonai
1966	1989	幌内立坑 (入気)	Horonai Tatekõ (Ventilation Inlet)	Pit	Horonai
1975	1989	幌内立坑 (排気)	Horonai Tatekõ (Ventilation Outlet)	Pit	Horonai

== Closure ==
In the 1970s, the Horonai mine faced several mine accidents, and thus became unprofitable. In November 1975, a gas explosion took 13 lives and caused an underground fire that had to be extinguished by pouring 4 billion liters of water into the mine. The extinguishing and subsequent repairs dragged on for two years and left the mine with a debt of 120 billion yen and on the verge of bankruptcy.

As a final attempt, the parent company was in 1978 split into the departments of Horonai, Sorachi, Mayachi and Yubari. These subsidiaries were accumulating losses and the bank of the parent company, Mitsui, was no longer willing to cover these losses. Again, on November 27, 1977, another deadly gas explosion with more than 15 victims occurred in Horonai, and its financial situation worsened. As a result, the local government had to buy up its properties, such as the mining community and its facilities, in order to finance its closure.

== Adaptive reuse ==
Due to its difficult financial situation Hokutan could not even clean up its own properties. Ultimately, only the steel structures (excluding the Horonai shaft) have been erased, but the concrete structures remained standing in the landscape. The city of Mikasa built a railway museum on the access road to the mining site. However, this museum could not replace the income from the mining activities, and the city balanced on the verge of bankruptcy. These events forced the regional government of Sorachi to adjust its regeneration policy. So it proclaimed in 1998 the "Law for the Examination of Mining Heritage," (炭鉱の記憶調査事業, Tankō no Kioku Chōsa Jigyō) which supported the enhancement of regional material and immaterial heritage. In response to it, professor Hirotaka Yoshioka (吉岡宏高) promoted the valorisation of the mining heritage of Mikasa by organizing heritage walks at the site of the mine Horonai, which resulted in the establishment of the landscape park of the coal mine Horonai (幌内炭鉱景観公園, Horonai Tankō Keikan Kōen).
