= Mitsubishi Materials =

Japanese company, and manufacturer of products for Mitsubishi

Mitsubishi Materials Corporation
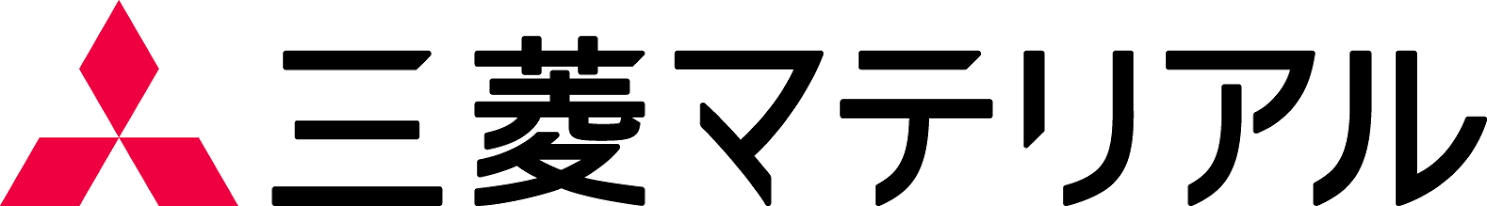

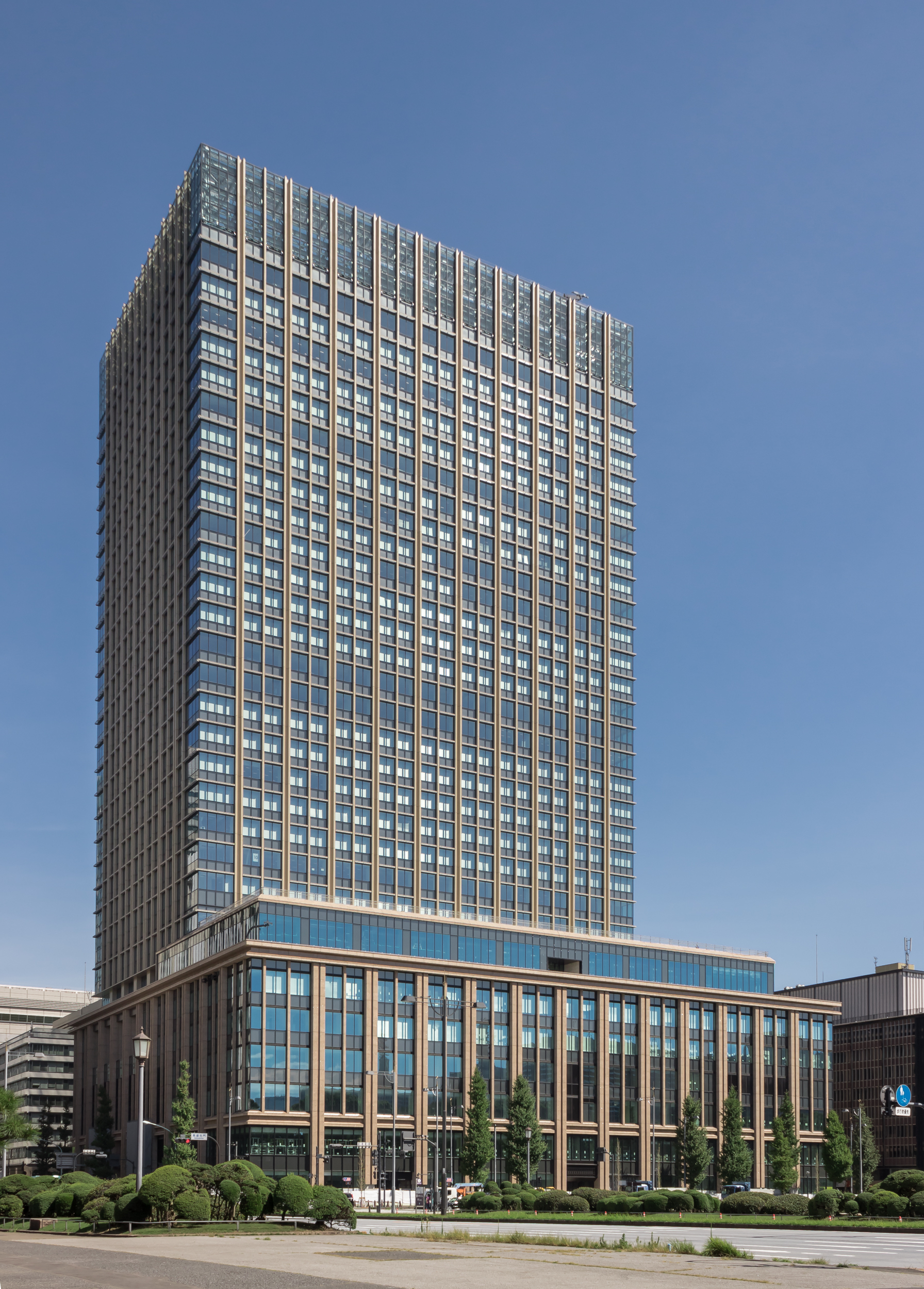
- Company type: Public
- Traded as: TYO: 5711; OSE: 5711; Nikkei 225 Component
- Industry: Metals
- Founded: 1871; 155 years ago
- Founder: Yataro Iwasaki
- Headquarters: Chiyoda-ku, Tokyo, Japan
- Key people: Akira Takeuchi (chairman); Naoki Ono (president)
- Products: Cement; Building materials; Metal products; Precious metals; Aluminum and aluminum products; Electronic materials
- Services: Recycling services
- Revenue: ▲US$14.36 billion (FY 2018) (¥ 1,599 billion JPY) (FY 2018)
- Net income: ▲US$988 million (FY 2018) (¥ 110.11 billion JPY) (FY 2018)
- Number of employees: ▼18,323 (consolidated as of March 31, 2024)
- Website: Official website

Mitsubishi Materials Corporation (三菱マテリアル株式会社, Mitsubishi Materiaru Kabushiki-gaisha), or MMC, is a Japanese company that manufactures cement products, copper and aluminum products, cemented carbide tools, and electronic materials. It is one of the core companies of Mitsubishi Group.

The company is listed on the Tokyo Stock Exchange and the Osaka Securities Exchange, and is a constituent of the Nikkei 225 stock market index.

In 2018 Mitsubishi Materials admitted that five of its subsidiaries, Mitsubishi Cable Industries Ltd., Mitsubishi Shindoh Co., Mitsubishi Aluminum Co., Tachibana Metal MFG Co. and Diamet Corp., had falsified quality data over the past three years on shipments including aluminium and automotive components. Mitsubishi Materials has started investigations at about 120 factories in its group.

== Business summary ==
Mitsubishi Materials Corporation has eight business sections, which are:

- Cement business
  - Portland cement
  - Cement-related products
  - Ready-mix concrete
  - Building materials
- Metals business
  - Copper smelting
  - Copper and copper alloy products
- Advanced materials & tools business
  - Cemented carbide products
  - Sintered parts
  - High-performance alloy products
- Energy business
  - Fossil fuels
  - Nuclear energy-related services
- Electronic materials & components business
  - Electronic materials
  - Electronic components
  - Polycrystalline silicon
  - Chemicals
- Recycling business
  - Resource-, environment-, and recycling-related products
- Aluminum business
  - Aluminum beverage cans
  - Rolled and extruded aluminum products
  - Processed aluminum products
- Precious metals business
