= Utashinai =

Utashinai 歌志内市
- City
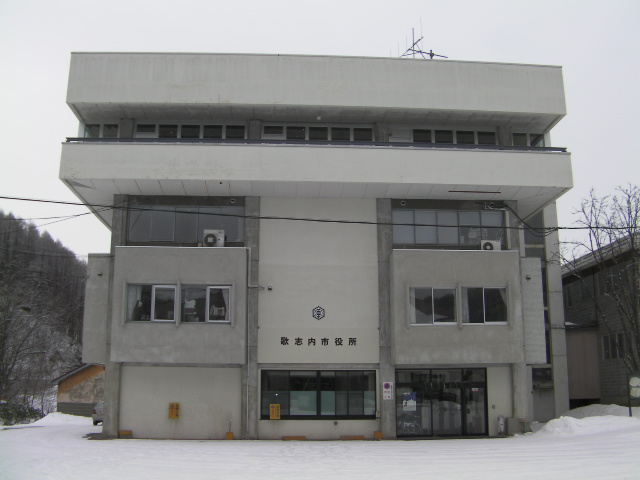
- Utashinai city hall

- Flag Seal

- Location of Utashinai in Hokkaido (Sorachi Subprefecture)

- Location in Japan
- Coordinates: 43°31′N 142°2′E
- Country: Japan
- Region: Hokkaido
- Prefecture: Hokkaido (Sorachi Subprefecture)

Government
  - Mayor: Takaoki Murakami

Area
  - Total: 55.99 km^{2} (21.62 sq mi)

Population (January 31, 2024)
  - Total: 2,662
  - Density: 47.54/km^{2} (123.1/sq mi)
- Time zone: UTC+09:00 (JST)
- City hall address: 5, Aza Honchō, Utashinai-shi, Hokkaidō; 073-0492
- Website: www.city.utashinai.hokkaido.jp
- Symbols
- Bird: Japanese bush-warbler
- Flower: Azalea
- Mascot: Horun-kun (ホルンくん)
- Tree: Japanese rowan

Utashinai (歌志内市, Utashinai-shi; Japanese pronunciation: [ɯ̈̀.tä́.ɕí.nä̀ì, -nä́.í.ɕì, -nä́ì.ɕì]) is a city located in Sorachi Subprefecture, Hokkaido, Japan. It is Japan's smallest city by population.

== History ==
Utashinai was formerly a prosperous coal mining city, but its fortunes has declined greatly since the closing of the coal mines. The population peaked at 46,000 in 1948, and has been decreasing every year since.

Efforts to transform Utashinai from a gritty coal mining town to an alpine tourist destination have met with mixed success. The town has adopted a Swiss theme as part of its tourist-oriented strategy and many new buildings are built in the Swiss chalet style. A medium-sized ski hill, Kamoidake, attracts a decent crowd of locals and hosts frequent ski meets, while a hot spring resort called Tyrol, after the Austrian region, is known throughout Hokkaido for the quality of its water. However, despite these new projects, Utashinai continues to experience population decline and economic stagnation. The local high school closed in 2007, with students now traveling to Sunagawa, Akabira or Takikawa for their secondary education.

=== Timeline ===
- 1890 - Sorachi Coal Mine opened, founding of Utashinai.
- 1897 - Utashinai Village split away from Nae Village (now the city of Sunagawa).
- 1900 - Ashibetsu Village splits off.
- 1906 - Utashinai becomes a Second Class Municipality.
- 1919 - Utashinai becomes a First Class Municipality.
- 1922 - Akabira Village split off.
- 1940 - Utashinai becomes a town.
- 1949 - Part of the town splits off into Kamisunagawa Town.
- July 1, 1958 - Utashinai becomes a city.
- 1971 - Sumitomo closes Utashinai Mine.
- 1988 - Kamiutashinai Mine closed.
- 1995 - Sorachi Mine closed.
- 2003 - Mid-Sorachi Merger Conference established.
- 2004 - Merger Conference disbanded.

== Geography ==
Penkeutashunai River, a tributary of Ishikari River, flows through Utashinai. There is Mount Kamoi on the northwest of the city.

=== Name ===
The name is derived from the Ainu ota-us-nay (オタウㇱナイ) meaning "River connected to a sandy beach".

== Demographics ==
As of December 31, 2020, the city had a population of 3,019, with 1,788 households, and a density of 62 persons per km^{2}. The total area of the city is 55.99 km^{2}. The population of Utashinai has been declining very rapidly for the past 80 years.

Historical population
Year	Pop.	±%
1950	40,954	—
1960	38,002	−7.2%
1970	19,334	−49.1%
1980	10,178	−47.4%
1990	8,279	−18.7%
2000	5,941	−28.2%
2010	4,387	−26.2%
2020	3,019	−31.2%

== Culture ==
=== Mascot ===
Horun-kun, the city's mascot

Utashinai's mascot is Horun-kun (ホルンくん), unveiled in 1998. He is a sheep carrying an alphorn, who moved from Switzerland to Japan.
