= Akabira =

Akabira 赤平市
- City
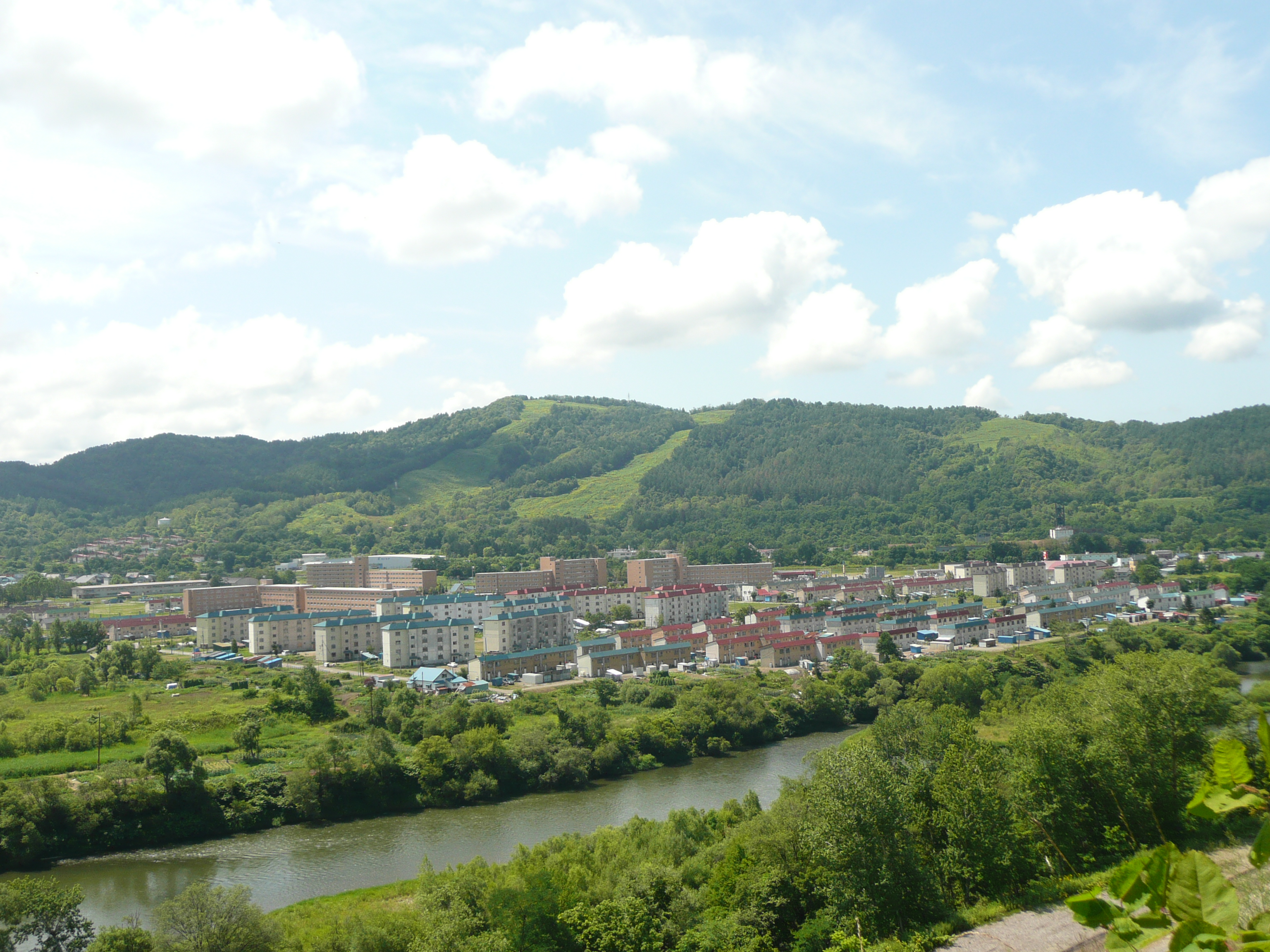

- Flag Emblem

- Location of Akabira in Hokkaido (Sorachi Subprefecture)

- Location in Japan
- Coordinates: 43°33′N 142°3′E
- Country: Japan
- Region: Hokkaido
- Prefecture: Hokkaido (Sorachi Subprefecture)

Government
  - Mayor: Wataru Hatakeyama (since May 2019)

Area
  - Total: 129.88 km^{2} (50.15 sq mi)

Population (January 31, 2024)
  - Total: 8,709
  - Density: 67.05/km^{2} (173.7/sq mi)
- Time zone: UTC+09:00 (JST)
- City hall address: 4-1 Izumimachi, Akabira-shi, Hokkaidō; 079-1192
- Website: www.city.akabira.hokkaido.jp
- Symbols
- Bird: Varied tit
- Flower: Lily
- Tree: Maple

Akabira (赤平市, Akabira-shi; Japanese pronunciation: [ä̀.kä́.bì.ɾä̀, -bí.ɾä́(.ɕì)]) is a city located in central Sorachi Subprefecture, Hokkaido, Japan. The name comes from the Ainu language but the meaning is uncertain; possibly it means "mountain ridge" or "cliff".

As of January 2024, the city has a population of 8,709 people living in 5,333 households. The total area is 129.88 km^{2}. The city was once a prosperous coal-mining city, its population reaching 59,430 in 1960. The population has been gradually declining. There have been efforts to create tourism around the city's coal mining heritage and other sights in order to strengthen the local economy. Other than that, there are also hot springs and campsites.

== History ==
- 1891 – Settlement begins.
- 1918 – Moshiri Coal Mine opens.
- 1922 – Second-class municipality Akabira Village split off of first-class municipality Utashinai.
- 1929 – Akabira becomes a First-Class municipality.
- 1937 – Shōwa Denkō Toyosato Mine opened.
- 1938 – Sumitomo Coal Mine, Hokkaido Coal Mine Railroad and Akama Coal Mine opened.
- 1943 – Akabira Village becomes Akabira Town.
- July 1, 1954 – Akabira Town becomes Akabira City.
- 1967 – Shōwa Denkō Toyosato Mine closed.
- 1969 – Moshiri Coal Mine closed.
- 1973 – Akama Coal Mine closed.
- 1994 – Sumitomo Coal Mine closed.
- 2003 – Mid-Sorachi Merger Committee established.
- 2007 – A major elementary school in Akabira closed down. It once had about 5000 students but has dropped rapidly after the closure of the coal mines.
- 2008 – Hokkaido provides the city with a low-interest loan to support the city
- February 28, 2015 – Guinness World Record for number of snowmen made in an hour (2036) for the filming of the drama Fuben na Benriya ("Inconvenient Handyman").

== Geography ==
Akabira is located in the central region of the Hokkaido Sorachi Subprefecture jurisdiction. The Sorachi River flows through the city limits from east to west. Originally, development stretched from Utashinai (歌志内) to Mojiri (茂尻), but now is an urban region along the Sorachi River.

=== Mountains ===
- Mt. Irumukeppu (イルムケップ山)
- Mt. Akabira (赤平山)
- Mt. Kamui (神威岳)

=== Rivers ===
- Sorachi River (空知川)
- Horokura River (幌倉川)
- Akamazawa River (赤間沢川)
- Katsura River (桂川)

=== Neighborhoods ===
- Akabira (赤平)
- Izumachi (泉町), Blocks 1-4
- Erumuchō (エルム町)
- Oomachi (大町), Blocks 1-4
- North Bunkyōchō (北文京町), Blocks 1-5
- Kyowachō (共和町)
- Saiwaichō (幸町), Blocks 1-7
- Sakuragichō (桜木町), Blocks 1-5
- Shōwachō (昭和町), Blocks 1-6
- Sumiyoshichō (住吉町)
- Toyookachō (豊丘町), Blocks 1-3
- Toyosato (字豊里)
- Nishikimachi (錦町), Blocks 1-3
- West Toyosatochō (西豊里町)
- West Bunkyōchō (西文京町), Blocks 1-5
- East Oomachi (東大町), Blocks 1-3
- East Toyosatochō (東豊里町)
- East Bunkyōchō (東文京町), Blocks 1-4
- Hyakkochō East (百戸町東), Blocks 1-5
- Hyakkochō West (百戸町西), Blocks 1-6
- Hyakkochō North (百戸町北)
- Hiragishikatsurachō (平岸桂町)
- Hiragishishinkōchō (平岸新光町), Blocks 1-9
- Hiragishinakamachi (平岸仲町), Blocks 1-6
- Hiragishihigashimachi (平岸東町), Blocks 1-6
- Hiragishinishimachi (平岸西町), Blocks 1-6
- Hiragishiminamimachi (平岸南町)
- Hiragishiakebonochō (平岸曙町), Blocks 1-6
- Hōeichō (豊栄町), Blocks 1-5
- Horookachō (幌岡町)
- Honchō (本町), Blocks 1-3
- Misonochō (美園町), Blocks 1-5
- Miyashitachō (宮下町), Blocks 1-5
- Mojiri (茂尻)
- Mojiriasahimachi (茂尻旭町), Blocks 1-3
- Mojirikasugachō (茂尻春日町), Blocks 1-3
- Mojirisakaemachi (茂尻栄町), Blocks 1-5
- Mojirishinkasugachō (茂尻新春日町), Blocks 1-2
- Mojirishinmachi (茂尻新町), Blocks 1-5
- Mojirichūōchō South (茂尻中央町南), Blocks 1-6
- Mojirichūōchō North (茂尻中央町北), Blocks 1-2
- Mojirihonchō (茂尻本町), Blocks 1-4
- Mojirimiyashitachō (茂尻宮下町)
- Mojirimotomachi South (茂尻元町南), Blocks 1-5
- Mojirimotomachi North (茂尻元町北), Blocks 1-6
- Wakakichō East (若木町東), Blocks 1-9
- Wakakichō West (若木町西), Blocks 1-6
- Wakakichō South (若木町南), Blocks 1-5
- Wakakichō North (若木町北), Blocks 1-8

== Demographics ==
Per Japanese census data, the population of Akabira has declined precipitously in recent decades.

Historical population
Year	Pop.	±%
2000	15,753	—
2010	12,637	−19.8%
2020	9,698	−23.3%

== Transportation ==
Nemuro Main Line: Akabira – Moshiri – Hiragishi

== Education ==
- Akabira Municipal Board Of Education
  - Junior high school
    - Akabira junior high school
  - Elementary schools
    - Akama elementary school
    - Toyosato elementary school
    - Mojiri elementary school

== In popular culture ==
A climactic scene in the 2021 Academy Awards winning film Drive My Car was shot in Akabira, leading to interest from visitors.

== Friendship cities ==
- Kaga, Ishikawa, Japan (since 1995)
- Samcheok, Gangwon, South Korea (since 1997)
- Miluo City, Hunan, China (since 1999)
