= Ashibetsu =

Ashibetsu 芦別市
- City
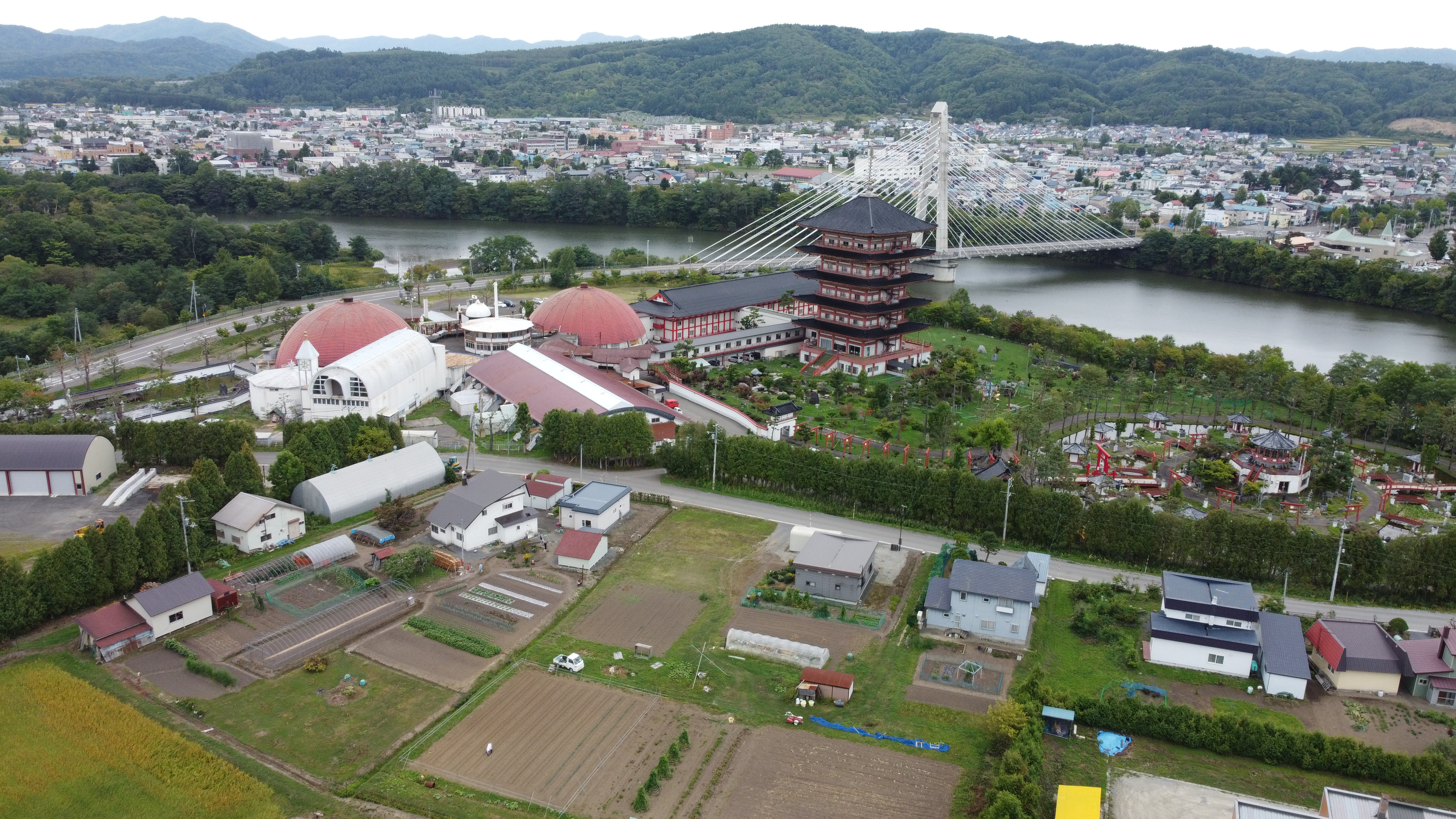

- Flag Emblem

- Location of Ashibetsu in Hokkaido (Sorachi Subprefecture)

- Location in Japan
- Coordinates: 43°31′N 142°11′E
- Country: Japan
- Region: Hokkaido
- Prefecture: Hokkaido (Sorachi Subprefecture)

Government
  - Mayor: Hiromu Konno

Area
  - Total: 865.02 km^{2} (333.99 sq mi)

Population (October 1, 2020)
  - Total: 12,555
  - Density: 14.514/km^{2} (37.591/sq mi)
- Time zone: UTC+09:00 (JST)
- City hall address: 1-3 Kita-ichijō Higashi, Ashibetsu-shi, Hokkaidō; 075-8711
- Climate: Dfb
- Website: www.city.ashibetsu.hokkaido.jp
- Symbols
- Bird: Great tit
- Flower: Lily
- Tree: Mizunara (Quercus crispula)

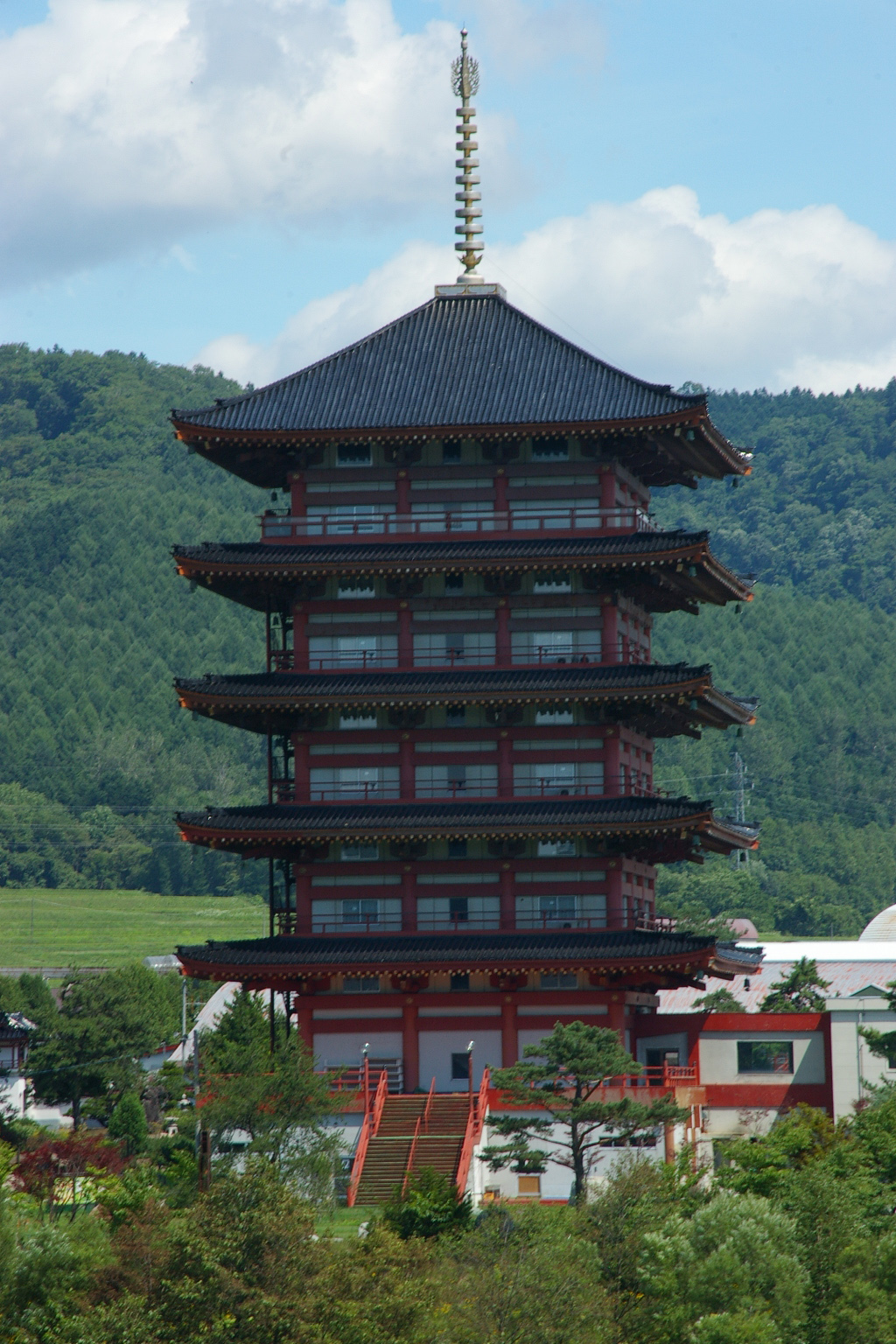
Five-storied pagoda in Ashibetu

Ashibetsu (芦別市, Ashibetsu-shi; Japanese pronunciation: [ä̀.ɕí.bè̞.t͡sɨ̀, -bé̞.t͡sɨ̥.ɕì]) is a city located in Sorachi Subprefecture, Hokkaido, Japan.

As of 1 October 2020, the city had an estimated population of 12,555 and a density of 15 persons per km^{2}. The total area is 865.02 km^{2}.

== History ==
Ashibetsu was once a prosperous coal mining city, its population exceeding 70,000 at its peak, but its population has fallen since the closing of the coal mines.

- 1893 – Satō Denjirō (originally from Yamagata Prefecture) founds Ashibetsu.
- 1897 – Nae Village (now Sunagawa City) and part of Takikawa Village (now City) split off to form Utashinai Village.
- 1900 – Ashibetsu Village split off of Utashinai Village.
- 1906 – Ashibetsu becomes a Second Class Municipality.
- 1917 – Kuhara Mining Industry Yuya Ashibetu Coal Mine opened.
- 1923 – First Class Municipality.
- 1924 – Mitsubishi Mining Industry Ashibetsu Coal Mine opened.
- 1935 – Meiji Mining Industry Meiji-Kamiashibetsu Coal Mine opened.
- 1938 – Ashibetsu-Takane Colliery Takane Mining Station opened.
- 1941 – Ashibetsu Village becomes Ashibetsu Town.
- 1943 – Mitsui-Ashibetsu Mining Industry Mitsui-Ashibetsu Coal Mine opened.
- 1953 – Ashibetsu Town becomes Ashibetsu City.
- 1963 – Meiji Mining Industry Meiji-Kamiashibetsu Coal Mine closed.
- 1964 – Mitsubishi Mining Industry Ashibetsu Coal Mine closed.
- 1967 – Ashibetsu-Takane Colliery Takane Mining Station closed.
- 1969 – Yuya Mining Industry Yuya Ashibetu Coal Mine closed.
- 1992 – Mitsui-Ashibetsu Mining Industry Mitsui-Ashibetsu Coal Mine closed.
- 1991 – Canadian World opened.
- 1997 – Canadian World closed and became a municipal park.

== Geography ==
Ashibetsu is in the northern part of Yūbari Mountains. Mount Ashibetsu is south of the city.

=== Name ===
There are two theories about the origin of "Ashibetsu". In both theories the name means Ashibetsu River, which flows through the city.

- "as pet", the river that flows in a shrub
- "hasi pet", the standing river

=== Locations of interest ===
- The Hokkaido Kannon is the third-tallest statue in Japan and is the tenth-tallest in the world. It was considered the tallest statue in the world when it opened in 1989 at 88 metres (289 ft), holding the world record until 1991.
- Canadian World is a scale model of the Canadian seaside village of Avonlea, the setting of Anne of Green Gables. It was built in 1990, which is said to be the origin of the sister city relationship between Ashibetsu and Charlottetown, the real city in Canada that Avonlea was based on. The park went bankrupt in 1997 and closed 1998, reopening in 1998 as a city-run park. It closed in October 2019 and reopened in April 2020, and is now run by the Canadian World Promotion Association which operates the park independently after receiving the buildings and other facilities free of charge from the city.

=== Neighbourhoods ===
- Asahimachi (旭町)
- Asahimachi Yuya (旭町油谷)
- Ashibetsu (芦別)
- Fukuzumichō (福住町)
- Higashiraijōchō (東頼城町)
- Honchō (本町)
- Horonai (幌内)
- Izumi (泉)
- Kamiashibetsuchō (上芦別町)
- Kawagishi (川岸)
- Kita 1 Jōhigashi (北1条東)
  - 1 chōme (1丁目)
  - 2 chōme (2丁目)
- Kita 2 Jōhigashi (北2条東)
  - 1 chōme (1丁目)
  - 2 chōme (2丁目)
- Kita 3 Jōhigashi (北3条東)
  - 1 chōme (1丁目)
  - 2 chōme (2丁目)
- Kita 4 Jōhigashi (北4条東)
- Kita 5 Jōhigashi (北5条東)
  - 1 chōme (1丁目)
  - 2 chōme (2丁目)
- Kita 6 Jōhigashi (北6条東)
- Kita 1 Jōnishi (北1条西)
  - 1 chōme (1丁目)
  - 2 chōme (2丁目)
- Kita 2 Jōnishi (北2条西)
  - 1 chōme (1丁目)
  - 2 chōme (2丁目)
  - 3 chōme (3丁目)
- Kita 3 Jōnishi (北3条西)
  - 1 chōme (1丁目)
  - 2 chōme (2丁目)
  - 3 chōme (3丁目)
- Kita 4 Jōnishi (北4条西)
  - 1 chōme (1丁目)
  - 2 chōme (2丁目)
  - 3 chōme (3丁目)
  - 4 chōme (4丁目)
- Kita 5 Jōnishi (北5条西)
  - 1 chōme (1丁目)
  - 2 chōme (2丁目)
  - 3 chōme (3丁目)
  - 4 chōme (4丁目)
  - 5 chōme (5丁目)
- Kita 6 Jōnishi (北6条西)
  - 1 chōme (1丁目)
  - 2 chōme (2丁目)
  - 3 chōme (3丁目)
  - 4 chōme (4丁目)
  - 5 chōme (5丁目)
- Kita 7 Jōnishi (北7条西)
  - 1 chōme (1丁目)
  - 2 chōme (2丁目)
  - 3 chōme (3丁目)
  - 4 chōme (4丁目)
  - 5 chōme (5丁目)
  - 6 chōme (6丁目)
- Koganechō (黄金町)
- Minami 1 Jōhigashi (南1条東)
  - 1 chōme (1丁目)
  - 2 chōme (2丁目)
- Minami 2 Jōhigashi (南2条東)
  - 1 chōme (1丁目)
  - 2 chōme (2丁目)
  - 3 chōme (3丁目)
- Minami 3 Jōhigashi (南3条東)
  - 1 chōme (1丁目)
  - 2 chōme (2丁目)
  - 3 chōme (3丁目)
- Minami 1 Jōnishi (南1条西)
- Nakanookachō (中の丘町)
- Nishiashibetsuchō (西芦別町)
- Nokananchō (野花南町)
- Raijōchō (頼城町)
- Rokusenchō (緑泉町)
- Shinjōchō (新城町)
- Takanechō (高根町)
- Takisatochō (滝里町)
- Tokiwa (常磐)
- Tokiwachō (常磐町)
- Toyooka (豊岡)
- Toyookachō (豊岡町)

== Climate ==
Climate data for Ashibetsu, elevation 91 m (299 ft), (1991–2020 normals, extremes 1978–present)
Month	Jan	Feb	Mar	Apr	May	Jun	Jul	Aug	Sep	Oct	Nov	Dec	Year
Record high °C (°F)	7.6 (45.7)	14.5 (58.1)	17.3 (63.1)	28.7 (83.7)	33.0 (91.4)	35.7 (96.3)	37.2 (99.0)	36.7 (98.1)	33.1 (91.6)	28.3 (82.9)	20.9 (69.6)	14.3 (57.7)	37.2 (99.0)
Mean daily maximum °C (°F)	−1.9 (28.6)	−0.7 (30.7)	3.8 (38.8)	11.4 (52.5)	18.8 (65.8)	23.0 (73.4)	26.5 (79.7)	26.9 (80.4)	22.6 (72.7)	15.5 (59.9)	7.1 (44.8)	0.1 (32.2)	12.8 (55.0)
Daily mean °C (°F)	−6.4 (20.5)	−5.6 (21.9)	−1.0 (30.2)	5.5 (41.9)	12.3 (54.1)	16.9 (62.4)	20.9 (69.6)	21.4 (70.5)	16.6 (61.9)	9.6 (49.3)	2.7 (36.9)	−3.8 (25.2)	7.4 (45.3)
Mean daily minimum °C (°F)	−11.3 (11.7)	−11.1 (12.0)	−6.1 (21.0)	0.0 (32.0)	6.1 (43.0)	11.8 (53.2)	16.4 (61.5)	17.0 (62.6)	11.7 (53.1)	4.7 (40.5)	−1.2 (29.8)	−7.8 (18.0)	2.5 (36.5)
Record low °C (°F)	−26.3 (−15.3)	−25.7 (−14.3)	−23.8 (−10.8)	−11.2 (11.8)	−2.4 (27.7)	1.8 (35.2)	8.0 (46.4)	8.4 (47.1)	1.7 (35.1)	−2.7 (27.1)	−13.3 (8.1)	−21.1 (−6.0)	−26.3 (−15.3)
Average precipitation mm (inches)	65.3 (2.57)	53.1 (2.09)	59.4 (2.34)	53.7 (2.11)	66.7 (2.63)	76.3 (3.00)	122.9 (4.84)	152.7 (6.01)	142.8 (5.62)	116.1 (4.57)	128.3 (5.05)	98.2 (3.87)	1,141.6 (44.94)
Average snowfall cm (inches)	161 (63)	140 (55)	108 (43)	14 (5.5)	0 (0)	0 (0)	0 (0)	0 (0)	0 (0)	2 (0.8)	67 (26)	177 (70)	666 (262)
Average extreme snow depth cm (inches)	68 (27)	79 (31)	72 (28)	21 (8.3)	0 (0)	0 (0)	0 (0)	0 (0)	0 (0)	1 (0.4)	23 (9.1)	50 (20)	79 (31)
Average precipitation days (≥ 1.0 mm)	17.2	14.9	14.1	11.8	11.2	9.1	10.7	11.8	12.5	15.4	18.7	20.4	167.3
Average snowy days (≥ 3.0 cm)	18.3	16.2	13.3	1.9	0	0	0	0	0	0.2	6.3	18.5	74.7
Mean monthly sunshine hours	76.1	84.6	129.5	160.4	188.1	169.7	163.1	155.9	155.0	126.5	69.0	55.9	1,533.9
Source: Japan Meteorological Agency (1991–2020 normals, extremes 1978–present)

== Demographics ==
Per Japanese census data, the population of Ashibetsu has declined precipitously over the past half-century. Of the residents who remain, nearly half are age 65 or older.

Historical population
Year	Pop.	±%
1970	42,730	—
1980	32,946	−22.9%
1990	25,078	−23.9%
2000	21,026	−16.2%
2010	16,628	−20.9%
2020	12,555	−24.5%

== Education ==
=== University ===
- Seisa University

=== College ===
- Kitanippon Automobile Technical College

=== High schools ===
==== Public ====
- Hokkaido Ashibetsu High School

==== Private ====
- Seisa Kokusai High School

== Transportation ==
- Nemuro Main Line: Ashibetsu – Kami-Ashibetsu – Nokanan
- Route 38

== Sister cities ==
- Charlottetown, Prince Edward Island, Canada
