= Shiribeshi-Toshibetsu River =

River in Hokkaidō, Japan

Shiribeshi-Toshibetsu River 後志利別川
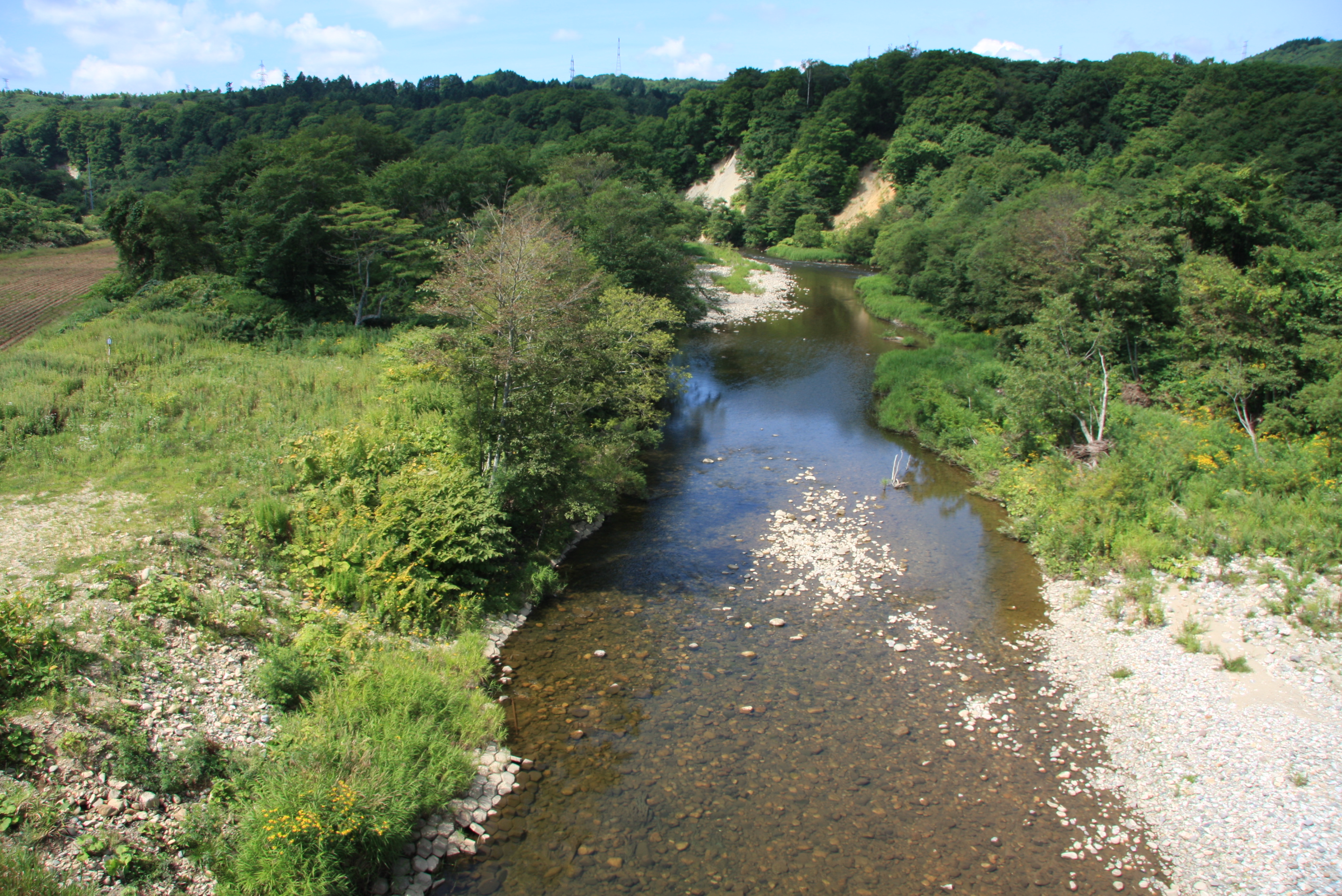
- Looking downstream from the Majo Bridge

- Location within Japan
- Native name: Shiribeshi-Toshibetsu-gawa (Japanese)

Location
- Country: Japan
- State: Hokkaidō
- Region: Hiyama
- District: Kudō District, Setana
- Municipalities: Imakane, Setana

Physical characteristics
- Source: Mount Oshamanbe
  - location: Imakane, Hokkaidō, Japan
  - coordinates: 42°35′9″N 140°11′22″E
  - elevation: 972.6 m (3,191 ft)
- Mouth: Sea of Japan
  - location: Setana, Hokkaidō, Japan
  - coordinates: 42°25′30″N 139°50′33″E
  - elevation: 0 m (0 ft)
- Length: 80 km (50 mi)
- Basin size: 720 km^{2} (280 sq mi)
- Discharge
  - average: 27.55 m^{3}/s (973 cu ft/s)

The Shiribeshi-Toshibetsu River (後志利別川, Shiribeshi-Toshibetsu-gawa) is a Class A river in Hokkaidō, Japan. It flows through Hiyama District, and empties into the Sea of Japan.

It is the only Class A river in Southern Hokkaidō, and thus is considered to be extremely important for agriculture and flood control.

The river was voted the "Cleanest River in Japan" by the Ministry of Land, Infrastructure, Transport and Tourism (MLIT) 10 times between 1987 and 2006.

== Geography ==
The Shiribeshi-Toshibetsu river originates from the ridge between Mount Taihei and Mount Oshamambe-dake. Its catchment area is 720 square kilometres (280 sq mi) and its stream length is 80 kilometres (50 mi). The river flows through Imakane, Setana. and Kitahiyama, Hokkaido.

== Climate ==
The basin is located at the northern limit of the temperate climate and is relatively warm due to the influence of the Tsushima Current moving northward across the Sea of Japan.

== Origin of name ==
The name Shiribeshi-Toshibetsu was formed by adding the word Shiribeshi to distinguish the river from the Toshibetsu River in Tokachi Subprefecture. Shiribeshi was the name of a province which existed between 1869 and 1882. The name Toshibetsu is thought to originate from the Ainu words toshu betsu, meaning 'meandering river', or to ushi betsu, meaning 'river with many marshes'.
