= Former provinces of Hokkaido =

In 1869, the island of Hokkaido, Japan was divided into 11 provinces and 86 districts. The majority of Japan's former provinces were converted into prefectures by the Meiji government between 1870 and 1876.

The Hokkaido provinces were dissolved in 1882, and replaced with Hakodate Prefecture, Sapporo Prefecture and Nemuro Prefecture. In 1886, the three prefectures were replaced with Hokkaidō-chō (北海道庁).

== List of provinces ==
The former provinces of Hokkaido are listed below with their districts.

=== Oshima Province ===
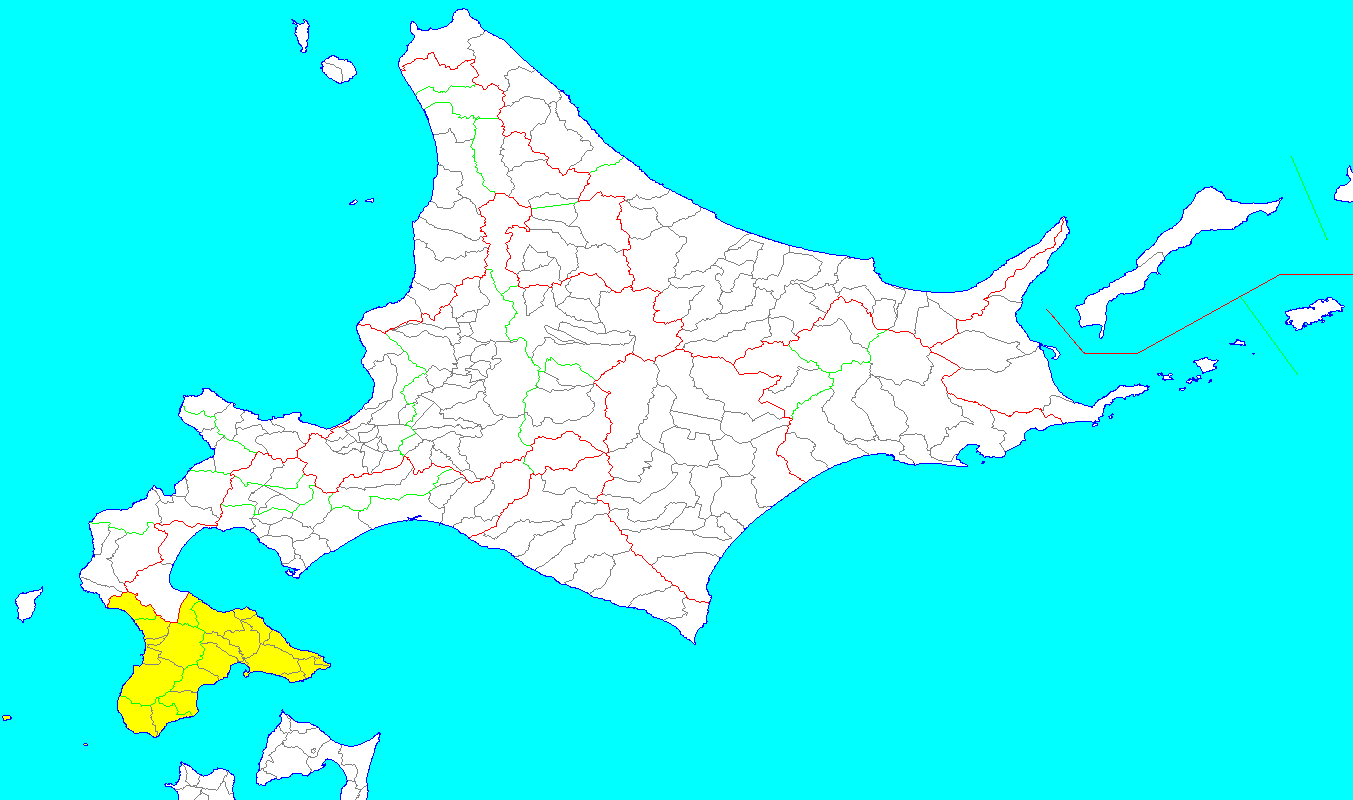
Location of Oshima Province c. 1869.

Oshima Province (渡島国, Oshima-no kuni): Presently the southern part of modern-day Oshima and Hiyama Subprefectures. Districts included:

- Kameda (亀田郡, -gun)
- Kayabe (茅部郡)
- Kamiiso (上磯郡)
- Fukushima (福島郡) – merged with Tsugaru District in 1881 to create Matsumae District
- Tsugaru (津軽郡) – merged with Fukushima District in 1881 to create Matsumae District
- Hiyama (檜山郡)
- Nishi (爾志郡)

=== Shiribeshi Province ===
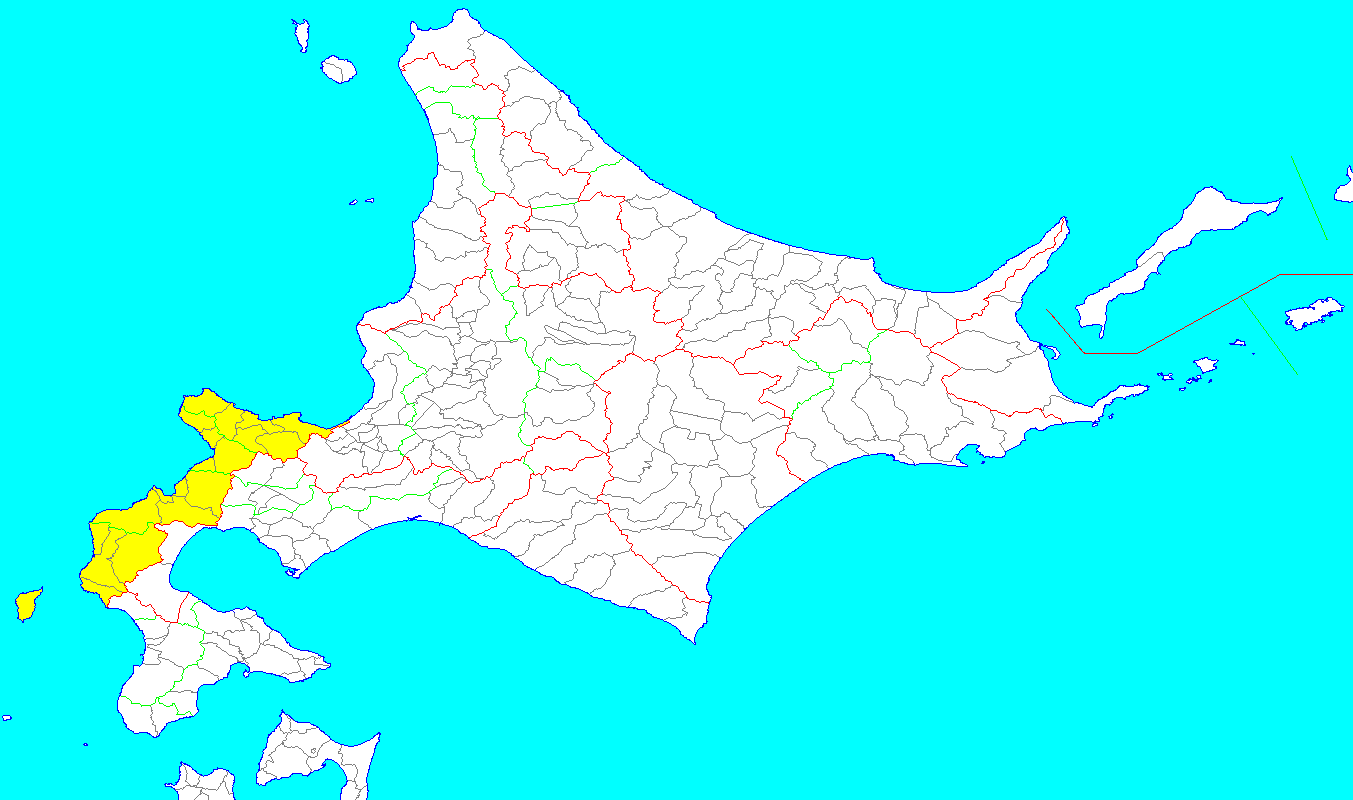
Location of Shiribeshi Province c. 1869.

Shiribeshi Province (後志国, Shiribeshi-no kuni): Modern-day Shiribeshi Subprefecture (minus Abuta) plus northern Hiyama. Districts included:

- Kudō (久遠郡)
- Okushiri (奥尻郡)
- Futoru (太櫓郡) – dissolved on April 1, 1955 when Futoru Village merged with Tōsetana Town (from Setana District) to create Kitahiyama Town
- Setana (瀬棚郡)
- Shimamake (島牧郡)
- Suttsu (寿都郡)
- Utasutsu (歌棄郡) – dissolved on January 15, 1955 when Utasutsu Village was incorporated into Suttsu Town (in Suttsu District); Neppu Village was merged with Suttsu District's Kuromatsunai Village and part of Tarukishi Village to create Sanwa Village (now Kuromatsunai Town)
- Isoya (磯屋郡, later respelled 磯谷郡)
- Iwanai (岩内郡)
- Furuu (古宇郡)
- Shakotan (積丹郡)
- Bikuni (美国郡) – dissolved September 30, 1956 when Bikuni Town was incorporated into Shakotan Town, Shakotan District.
- Furubira (古平郡)
- Yoichi (余市郡)
- Oshiyoro (忍路郡) – dissolved on April 1, 1958 when Shioya? Village was incorporated into Otaru City
- Takashima (高島郡) – dissolved on September 1, 1940 when Takashima Town was incorporated into Otaru
- Otaru (小樽郡) – dissolved on September 1, 1940 when Asato? Village was incorporated into Otaru

=== Iburi Province ===
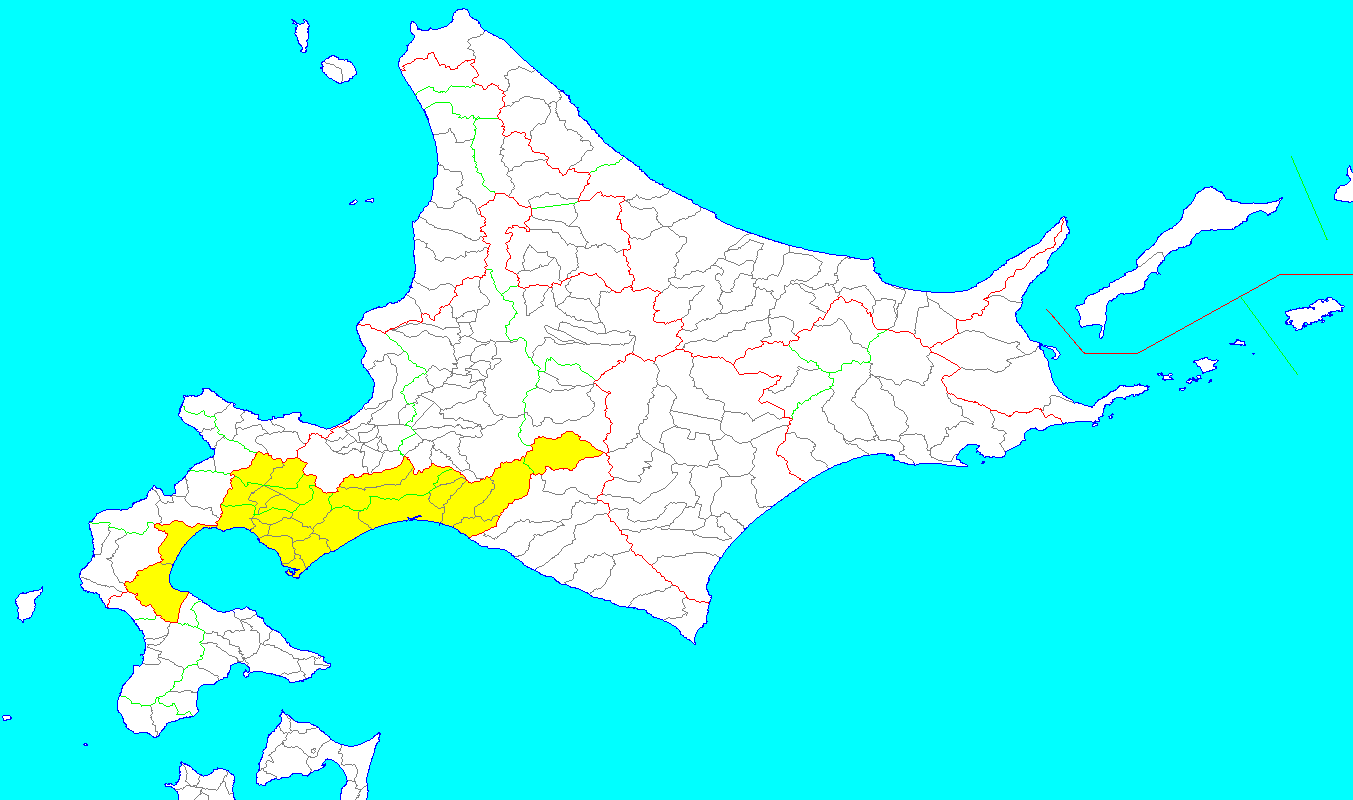
Location of Iburi Province c. 1869.

Iburi Province (胆振国, Iburi-no kuni): Modern-day Iburi Subprefecture, Yamakoshi District of Oshima, Abuta District of Shiribeshi, the cities of Chitose and Eniwa of Ishikari, and Shimukappu Village of Kamikawa. Districts included:

- Yamakoshi (山越郡)
- Abuta District (虻田郡)
- Usu (有珠郡)
- Muroran (室蘭郡) – dissolved on February 1, 1918 when four towns and villages merged to create Muroran-ku
- Yoribetsu (幌別郡) – dissolved on August 1, 1970 when Noboribetsu Town became Noboribetsu City
- Shiraoi (白老郡)
- Yūfutsu (勇払郡)
- Chitose (千歳郡) – dissolved on November 11, 1970 when Eniwa Town became a city

=== Ishikari Province ===
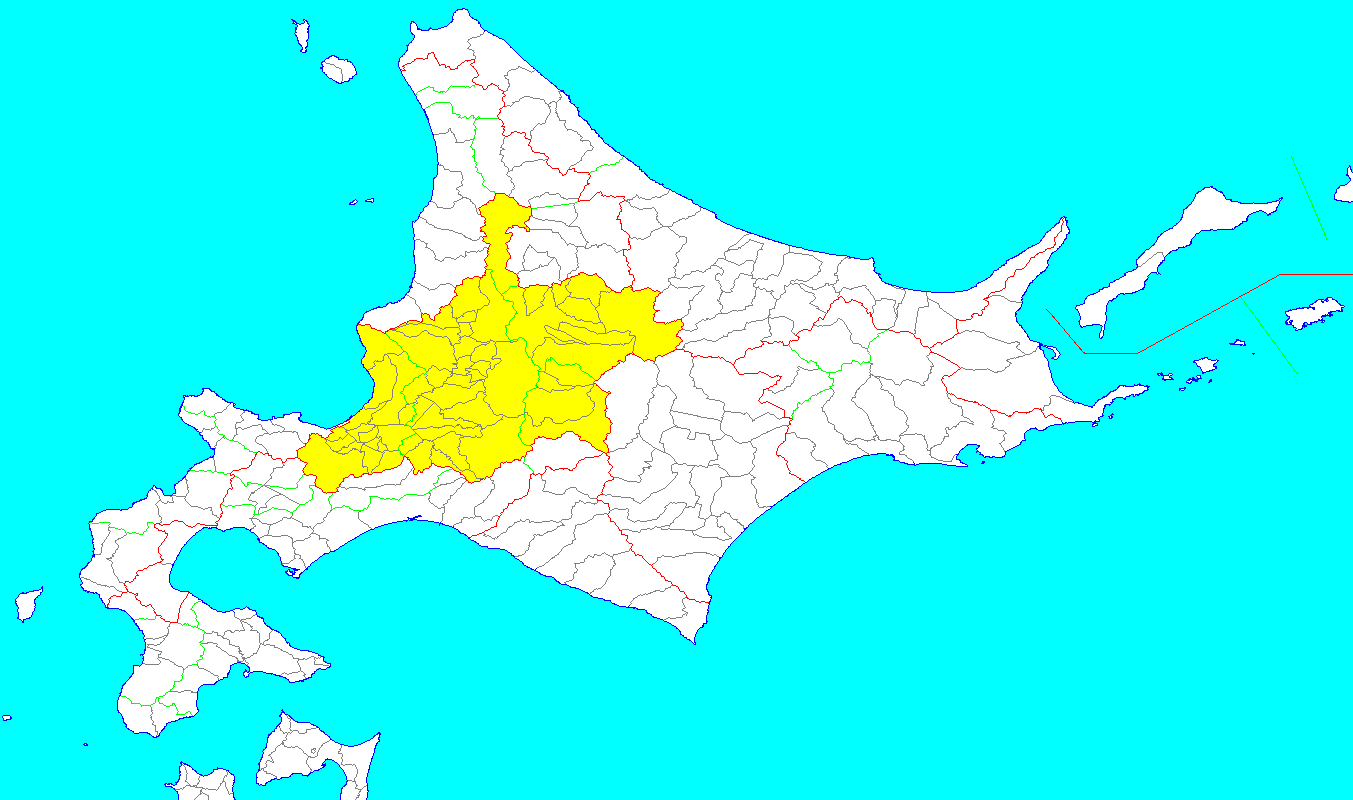
Location of Ishikari Province c. 1869.

Ishikari Province (石狩国, Ishikari-no kuni): Modern-day Ishikari Subprefecture minus Chitose and Eniwa, all of Sorachi Subprefecture, and the southern half of Kamikawa Subprefecture (including Horokanai and excluding Shimukappu). Districts included:

- Ishikari (石狩郡)
- Sapporo (札幌郡) – dissolved on September 1, 1996 when Hiroshima Town became Kitahiroshima City
- Yūbari (夕張郡)
- Kabato (樺戸郡)
- Sorachi (空知郡)
- Uryū (雨竜郡)
- Kamikawa (上川郡)
- Atsuta (厚田郡)
- Hamamasu (浜益郡)

=== Teshio Province ===
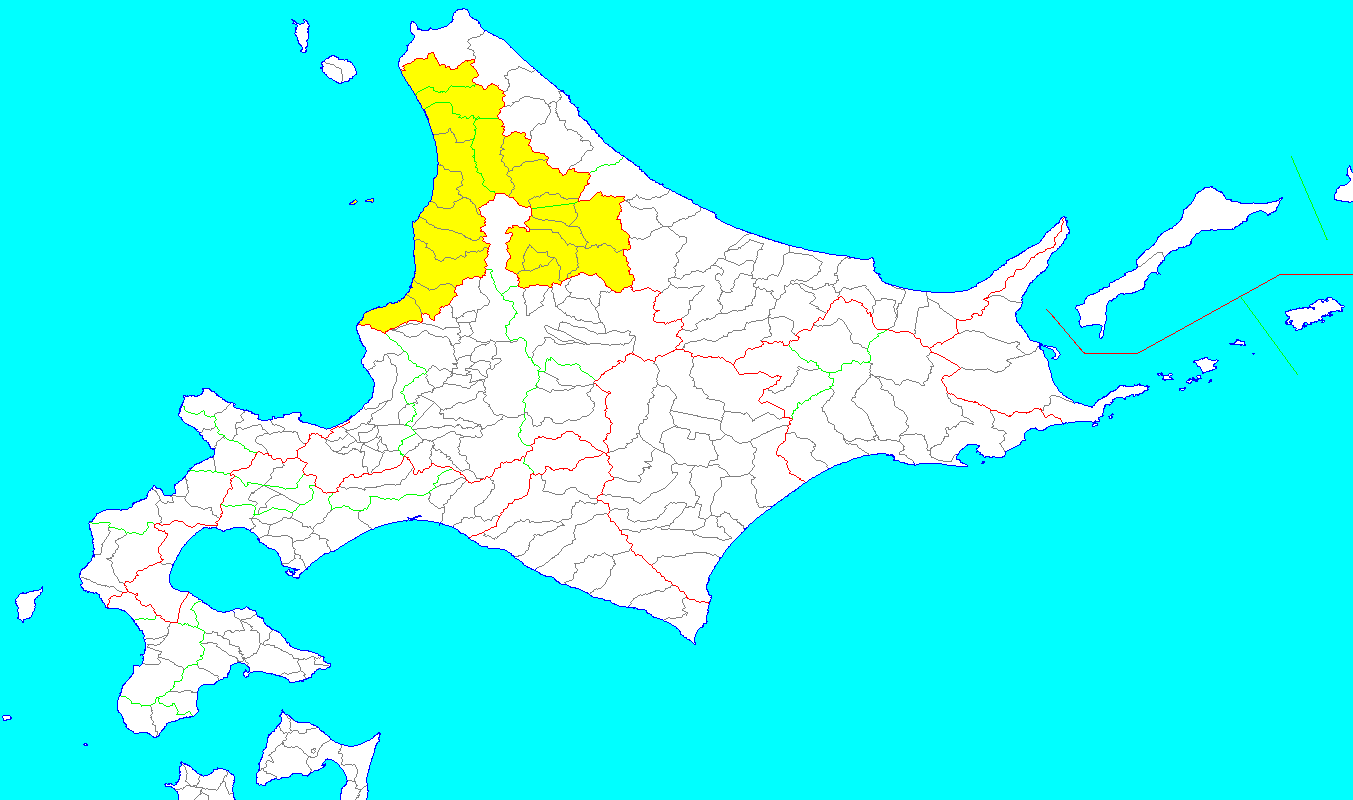
Location of Teshio Province c. 1869.

Teshio Province (天塩国, Teshio-no kuni): Presently all of modern-day Rumoi Subprefecture and the northern half of Kamikawa Subprefecture. Districts included:

- Mashike (増毛郡)
- Rumoi (留萌郡)
- Tomamae (苫前郡)
- Teshio (天塩郡)
- Nakagawa (中川郡)
- Kamikawa (上川郡)

=== Kitami Province ===
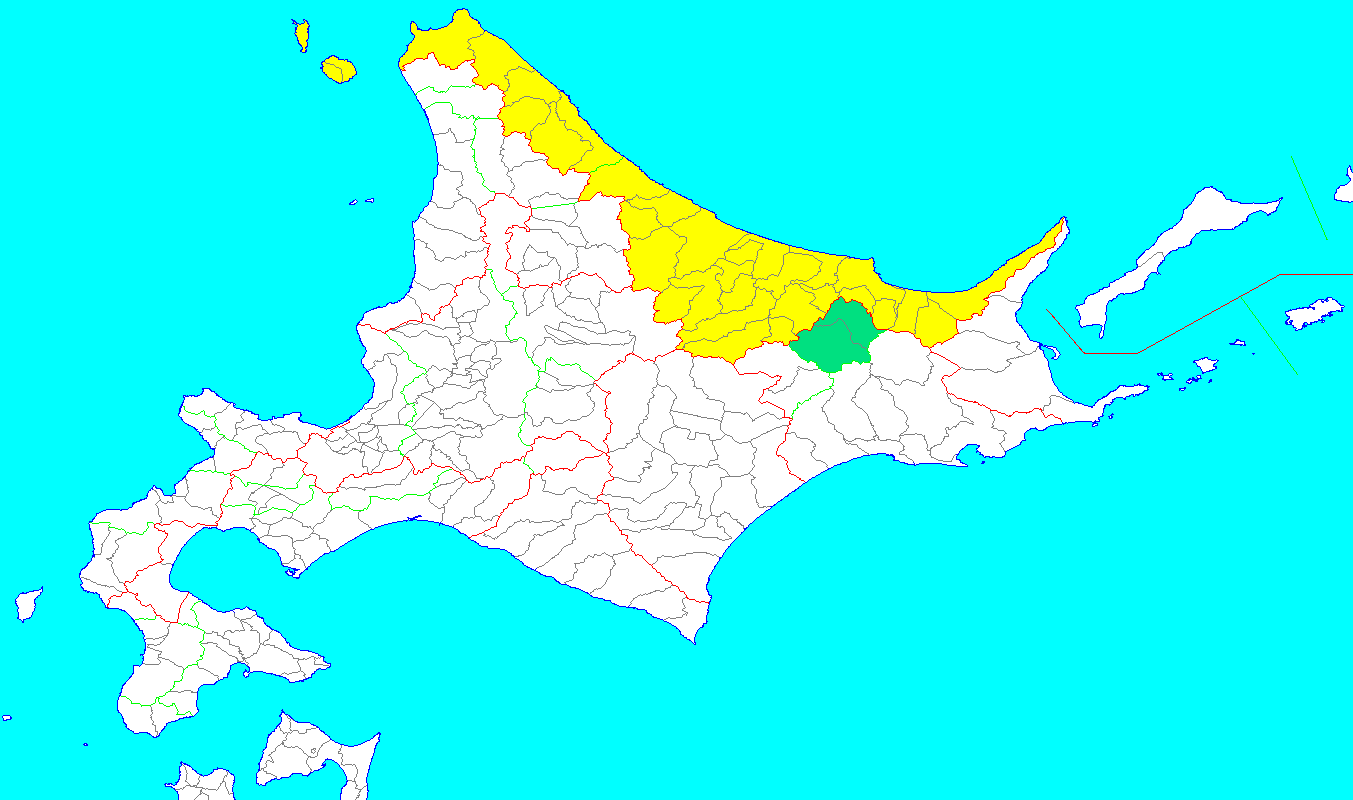
Location of Kitami Province c. 1869. Green highlighted area is Abashiri District from Kushiro Province c. 1881.

Kitami Province (北見国, Kitami no kuni): Modern-day Sōya Subprefecture and Abashiri Subprefecture minus part of Abashiri District. Districts included:

- Sōya (宗谷郡)
- Rishiri (利尻郡)
- Rebun (礼文郡)
- Esashi (枝幸郡)
- Monbetsu (紋別郡)
- Tokoro (常呂郡)
- Abashiri (網走郡)
- Shari (斜里郡)

=== Hidaka Province ===
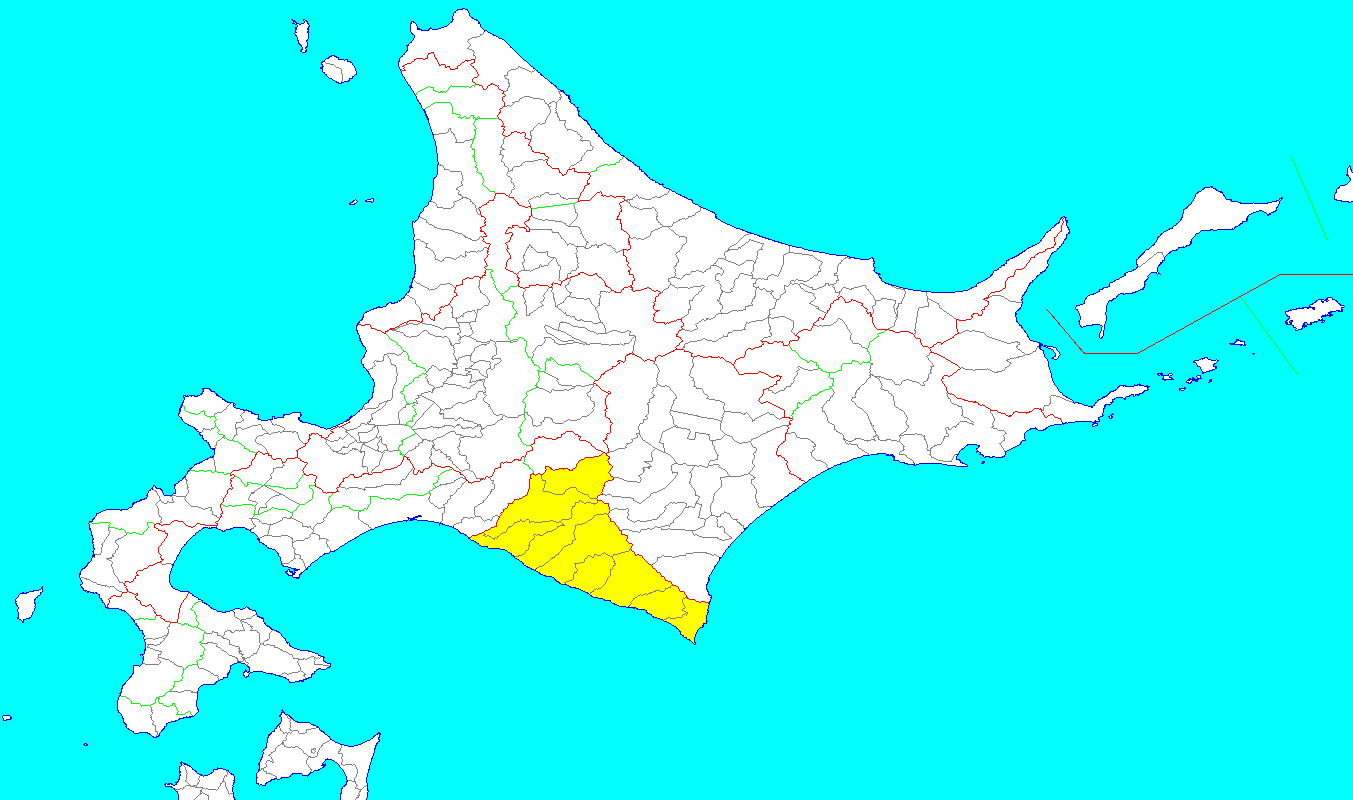
Location of Hidaka Province c. 1869.

Hidaka Province (日高国, Hideka-no kuni): Modern-day Hidaka Subprefecture. Districts included:

- Saru (沙流郡)
- Niikappu (新冠郡)
- Shizunai (静内郡)
- Mitsuishi (三石郡)
- Urakawa (浦河郡)
- Samani (様似郡)
- Horoizumi (幌泉郡)

=== Tokachi Province ===
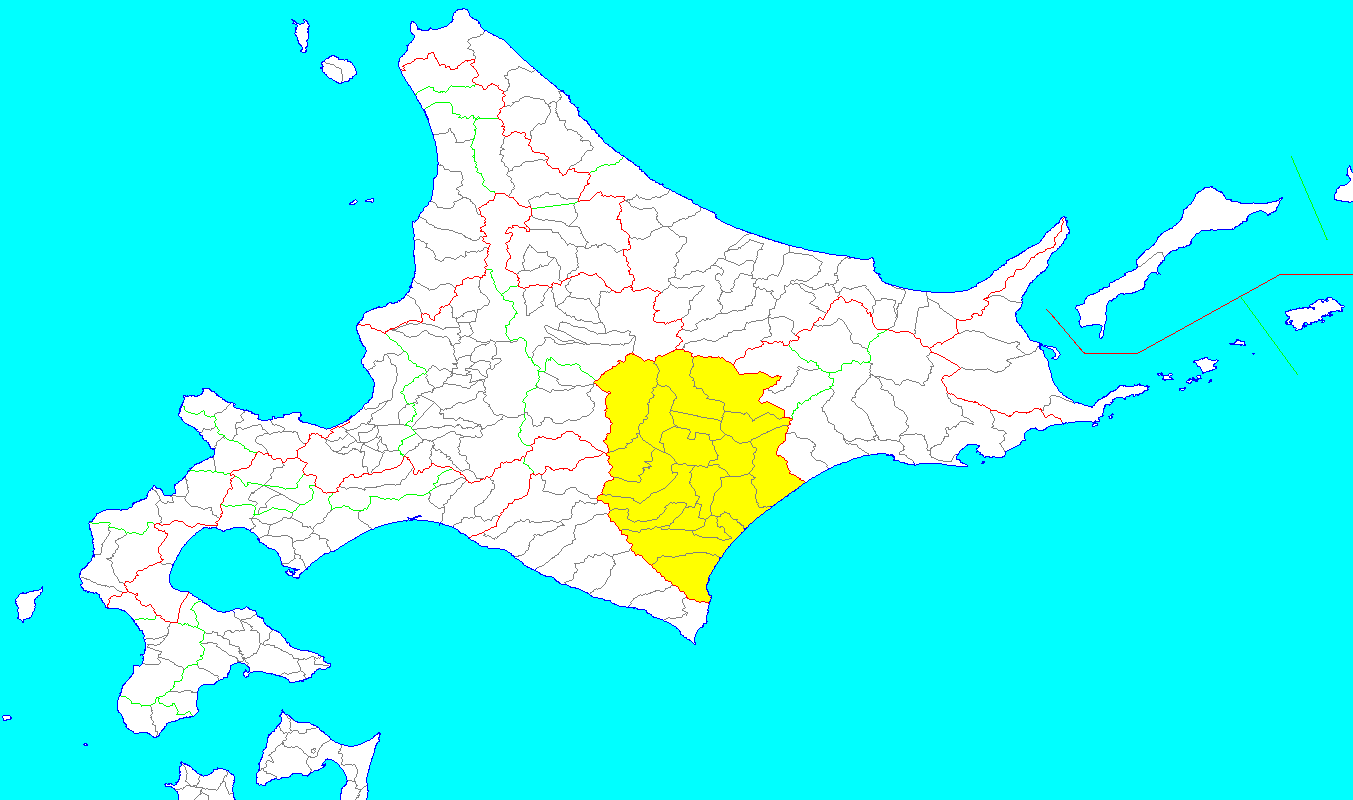
Location of Tokachi Province c. 1869.

Tokachi Province (十勝国, Tokachi-no kuni): Modern-day Tokachi Subprefecture. Districts included:

- Hiroo (広尾郡)
- Tōbui (当縁郡) – dissolved on April 1, 1906 when 3 villages merged into Moyori Village (now Hiroo Town) in Hiroo District and two villages merged with Ōtsu Village in Tokachi District
- Kamikawa (上川郡)
- Nakagawa (中川郡)
- Katō (河東郡)
- Kasai (河西郡)
- Tokachi (十勝郡)

=== Kushiro Province ===
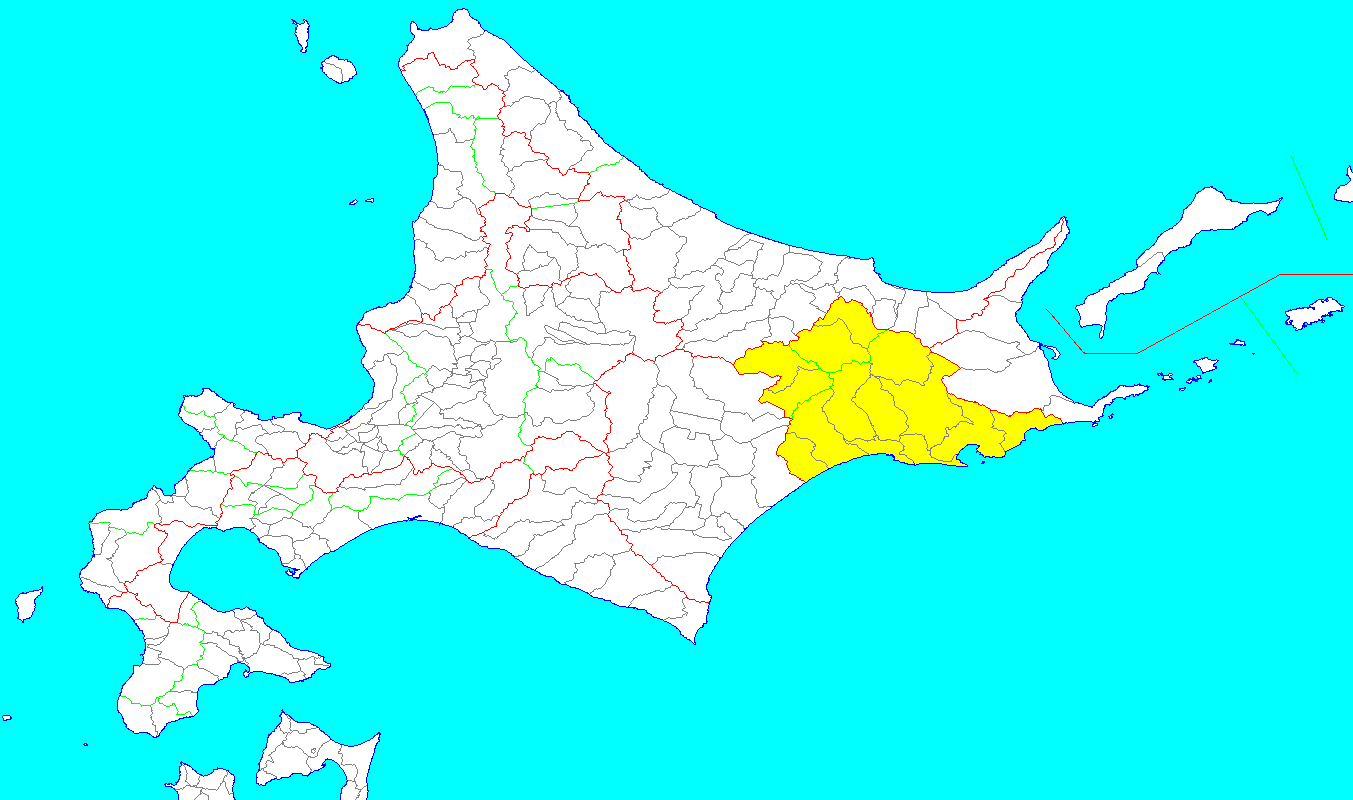
Location of Kushiro Province c. 1869.

Kushiro Province (釧路国, Kushiro-no kuni): Modern-day Kushiro Subprefecture and part of Abashiri Subprefecture. Districts included:

- Shiranuka (白糠郡)
- Ashoro (足寄郡)
- Kushiro (釧路郡)
- Akan (阿寒郡)
- Abashiri (網尻郡)
- Kawakami (川上郡)
- Akkeshi (厚岸郡)

=== Nemuro Province ===
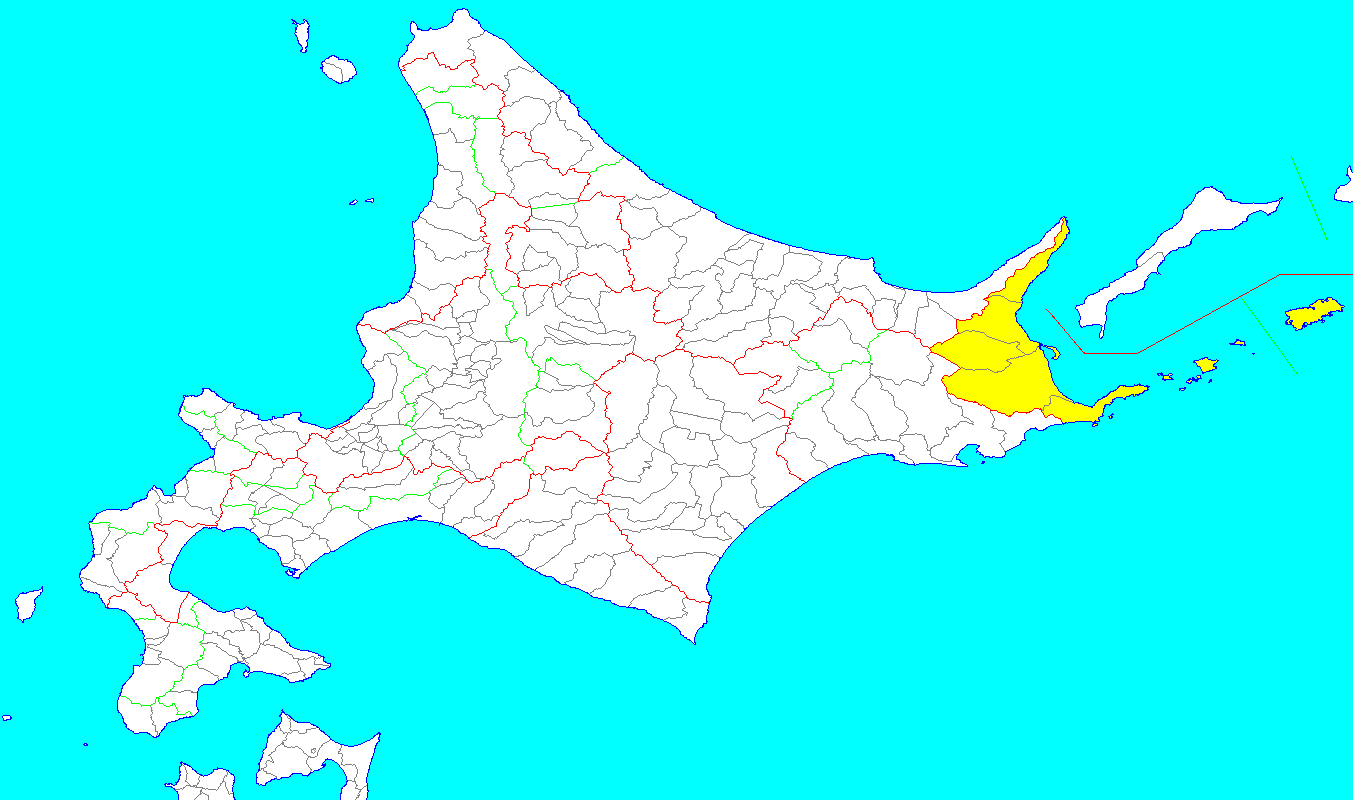
Location of Nemuro Province c. 1869.

Nemuro Province (根室国, Nemuro-no kuni): Presently the mainland portion of modern-day Nemuro Subprefecture plus Habomai Rocks and Shikotan Island. Districts included:

- Hanasaki (花咲郡) – dissolved on April 1, 1959 when Habomai Village was merged into Nemuro City; originally included Shikotan District
- Nemuro (根室郡) – dissolved on August 1, 1957 when Nemuro Town absorbed Wada Village to create Nemuro City
- Notsuke (野付郡)
- Shibetsu (標津郡)
- Menashi (目梨郡)

=== Chishima Province ===
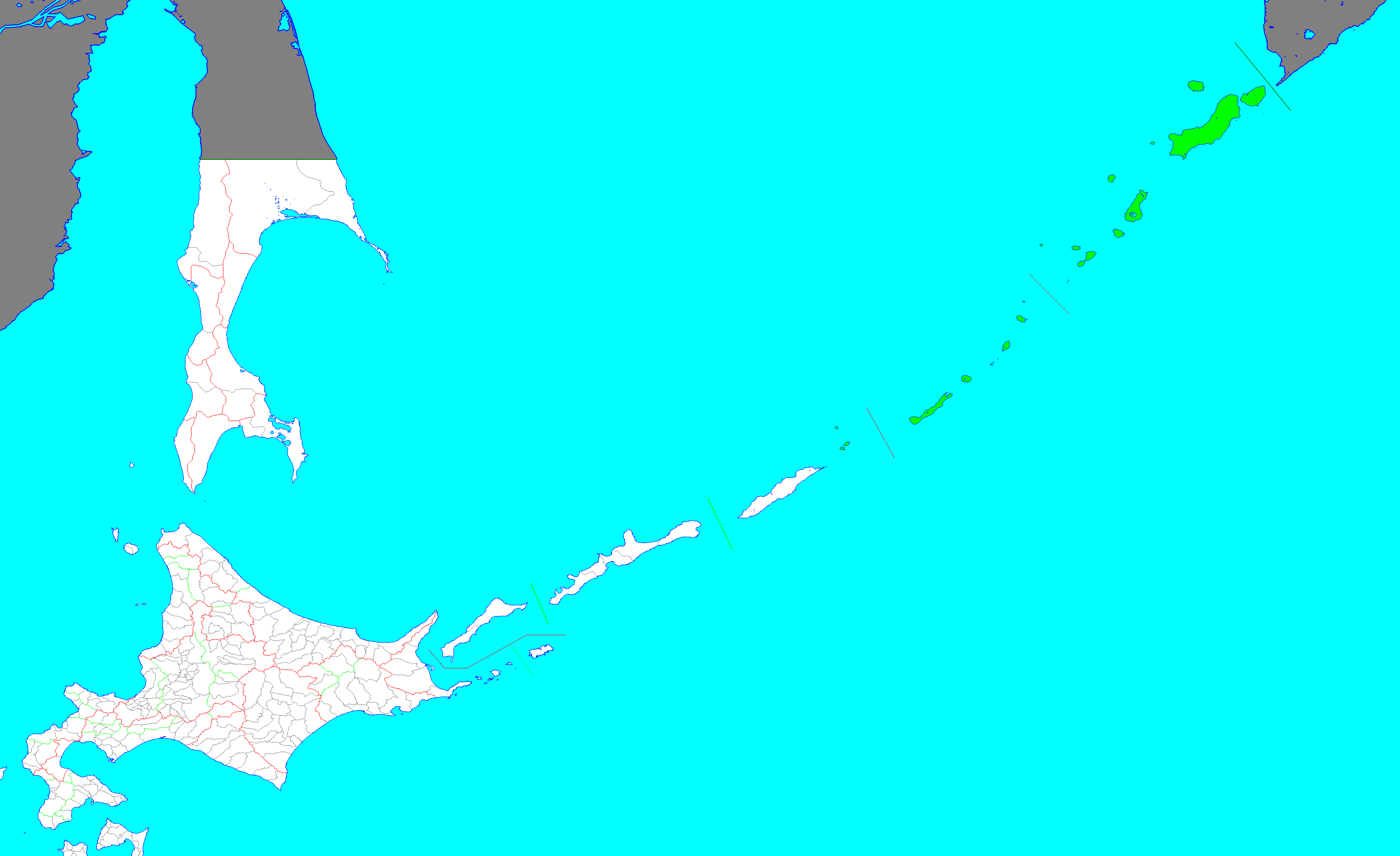
Location of Chishima Province c. 1869.

Chishima Province (千島国, Chismima-no kuni): Originally the islands of Kunashiri and Etorofu, later included Shikotan and the Kuril Islands. Districts included:

- Kunashiri (国後郡) – occupied and administered by Russia (see Kuril Islands dispute)
- Etorofu (択捉郡) – occupied and administered by Russia
- Furebetsu (振別郡) – dissolved in April 1923 when its villages merged with several villages in Shana and Etorofu Districts to create the village of Rubetsu (in Etorofu)
- Shana (紗那郡) – occupied and administered by Russia
- Shibetoro (蘂取郡) – occupied and administered by Russia
- Shikotan (色丹郡) – split off from Hanasaki District in 1885; currently occupied and administered by Russia
- Uruppu (得撫郡) – acquired in Treaty of Saint Petersburg (1875); ceded in San Francisco Treaty
- Shimushiru (新知郡) – acquired in Treaty of Saint Petersburg; ceded in San Francisco Treaty
- Shumushu (占守郡) – acquired in Treaty of Saint Petersburg; ceded in San Francisco Treaty

=== Karafuto ===
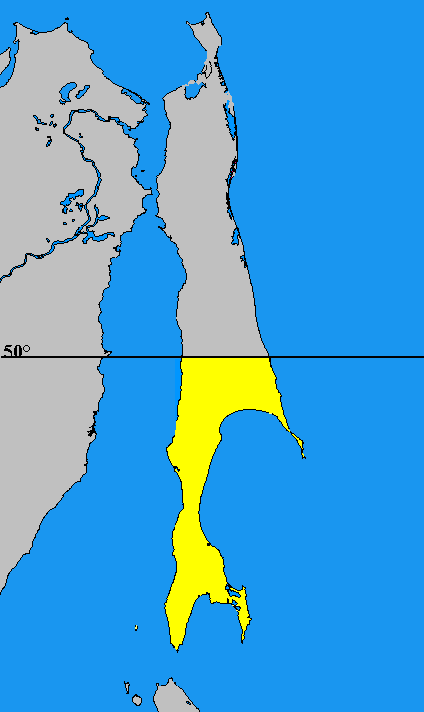
Location of Karafuto c. 1869.

Karafuto Region was the area of Sakhalin south of the border established by the 1875 Treaty of Saint Petersburg between Japan and Russia. After the 1905 Treaty of Portsmouth, Karafuto was administered from Toyohara in Karafuto Prefecture.
