= Shiribeshi Province =

Former province of Japan

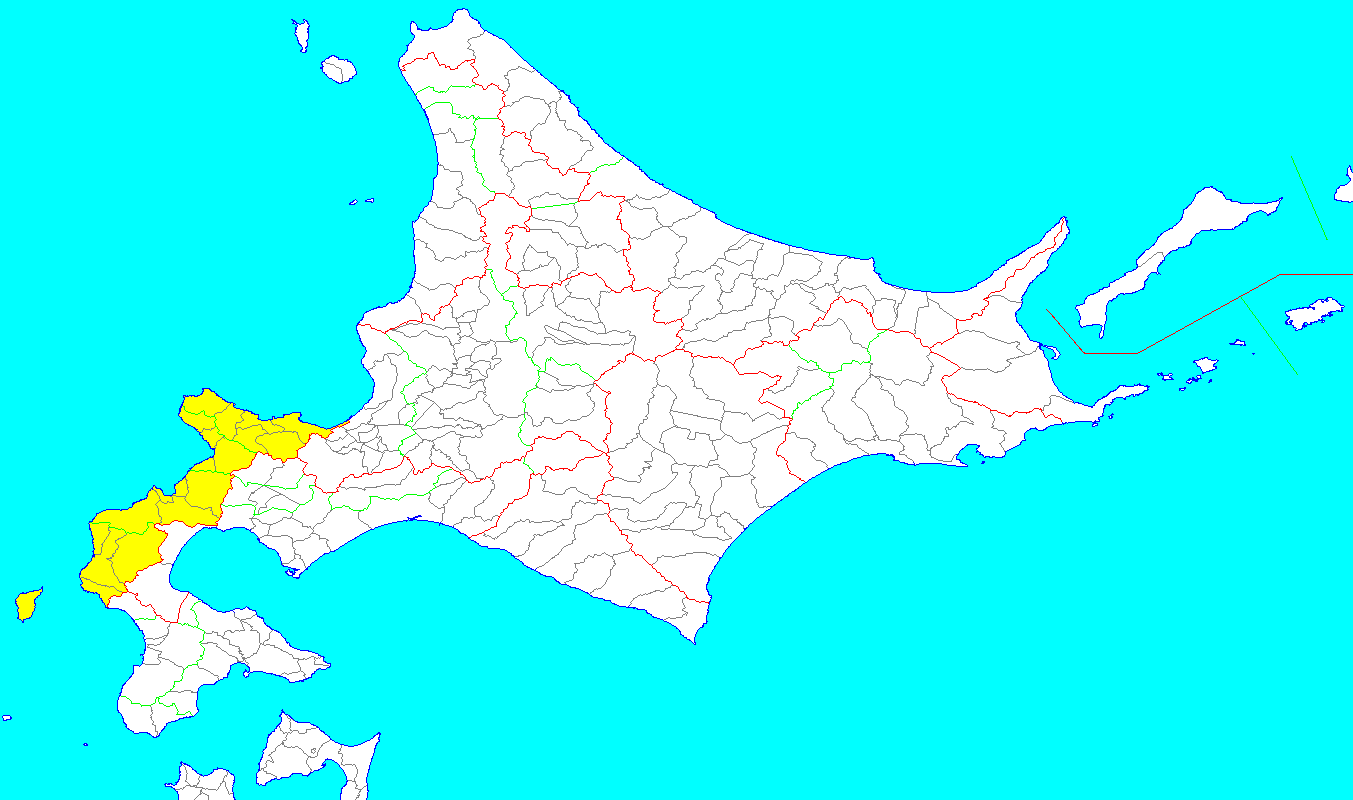
Location of Shiribeshi Province c. 1869.

Shiribeshi Province (後志国, Shiribeshi no Kuni; Japanese pronunciation: [ɕì.ɾʲí.bè̞.ɕì (nò̞ kɯ̈̀.ɲ̟ì)]) was a short-lived province in Hokkaidō. It corresponded to Shiribeshi Subprefecture minus Abuta District plus the northern part of Hiyama Subprefecture.

== History ==
After 1869, the northern Japanese island was known as Hokkaido; and regional administrative subdivisions were identified, including Shiribeshi Province.

In 1882, the Hokkaido region was separated into three prefectures — Hakodate Prefecture (函館県), Sapporo Prefecture (札幌県), and Nemuro Prefecture (根室県). In 1886, the three prefectures were abolished, and Hokkaido was put under the Hokkaido Agency (北海道庁). At the same time, the Shiribeshi Province continued to exist for some purposes. For example, Shiribeshi is explicitly recognized in treaties in 1894 (a) between Japan and the United States and (b) between Japan and the United Kingdom.

=== Timeline ===
- 659—the area named "Shiribeshi" first appears in Japanese historical records. The Nihon Shoki records that Abe no Hirafu (fl. 7th century) was dispatched by the imperial government in Kyoto to subdue the aboriginal inhabitants of the area, referred to as emishi.
- 1869—use of the Hokkaido name started
- August 15, 1869—Shiribeshi Province established with 17 districts
- 1872—Census finds 19,098 inhabitants of Shiribeshi Province
- 1882—prefectures established
- 1886—Hokkaido Agency established
- 1947—Hokkaido Prefecture established

== Districts ==
- Kudō (久遠郡)
- Okushiri (奥尻郡)
- Futoru (太櫓郡) Dissolved April 1, 1955 when Futoru Village merged with Tōsetana Town from Setana District to form Kitahiyama Town
- Setana (瀬棚郡)
- Shimamake (島牧郡)
- Suttsu (寿都郡)
- Utasutsu (歌棄郡) Dissolve January 15, 1955 when Utasutsu Village was incorporated into Suttsu Town, Suttsu District, Neppu Village merged with Suttsu District's Kuromatsunai Village and part of Tarukishi Village to form Sanwa Village (now Kuromatsunai Town)
- Isoya (磯屋郡, later respelled 磯谷郡)
- Iwanai (岩内郡)
- Furuu (古宇郡)
- Shakotan (積丹郡)
- Bikuni (美国郡) Dissolved September 30, 1956 when Bikuni Town was incorporated into Shakotan Town, Shakotan District.
- Furubira (古平郡)
- Yoichi (余市郡)
- Oshoro (忍路郡) Dissolved April 1, 1958 when Shioya? Village was incorporated into Otaru City
- Takashima (高島郡) Dissolved September 1, 1940 when Takashima Town was incorporated into Otaru
- Otaru (小樽郡) Dissolved September 1, 1940 when Asato? Village was incorporated into Otaru
