= Pirika Dam =

Dam in Hokkaidō Prefecture, Japan

Coordinates: 42°28′18″N 140°11′47″E

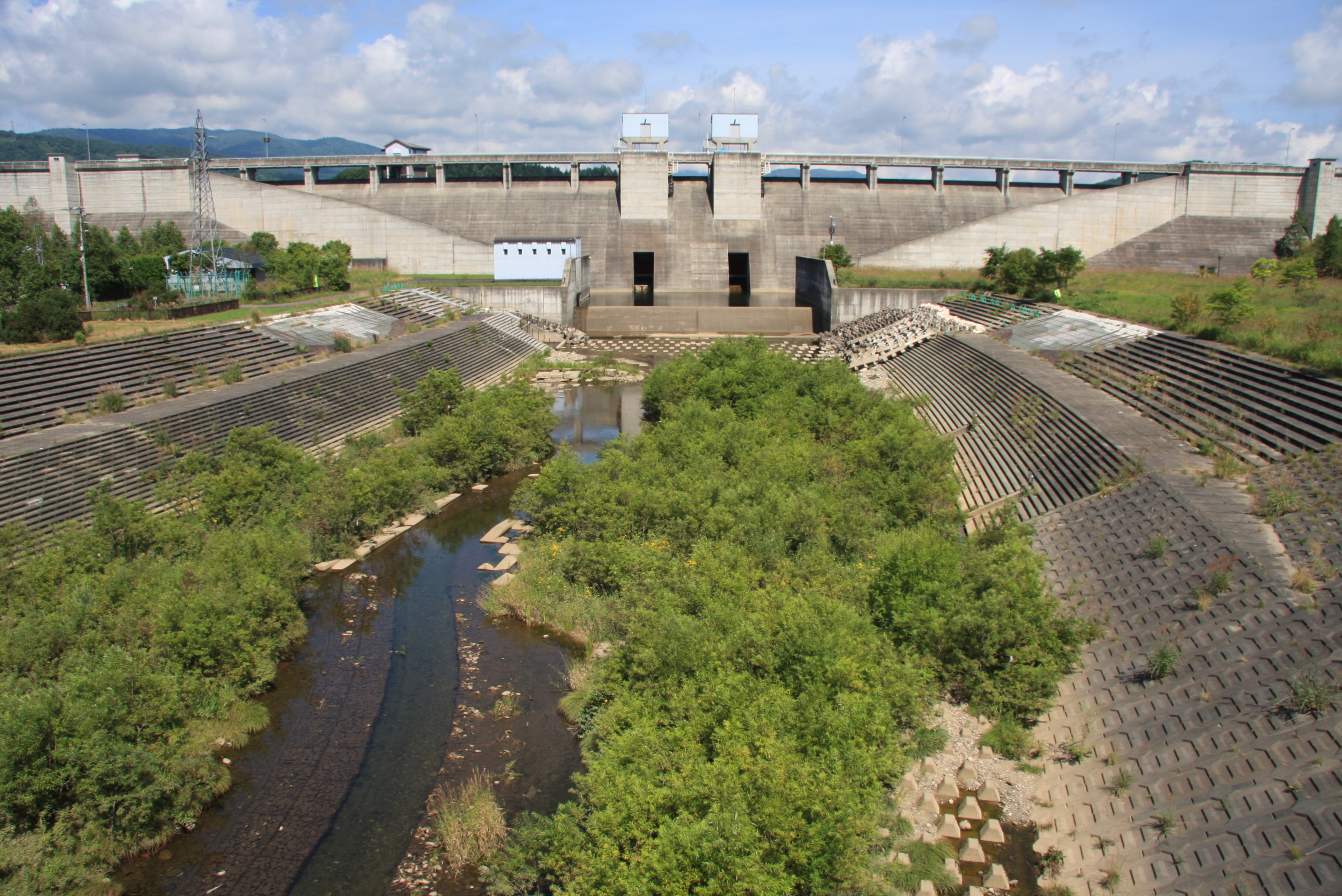
- Location: Hokkaidō, Japan
- Construction began: 1975
- Opening date: 1991

Dam and spillways
- Impounds: Shiribeshi-Ribetsu River
- Height: 40 m
- Length: 251.7 m

Reservoir
- Total capacity: 18,000,000 m^{3}
- Catchment area: 115 km^{2}
- Surface area: 185 hectares

The Pirika Dam (美利河ダム) is a dam located in Imakane, Setana District, Hiyama, Hokkaidō, Japan.

At 1480 meters in length, it is the longest dam in Japan and the largest in southern Hokkaidō. It is known for hosting the longest fish race in Japan (2.4 km).
