= Taisei, Hokkaido =

Town in Kudō district, Hiyama Subprefecture, Hokkaido Prefecture, Japan

Taisei 大成町 たいせいちょう
- Town
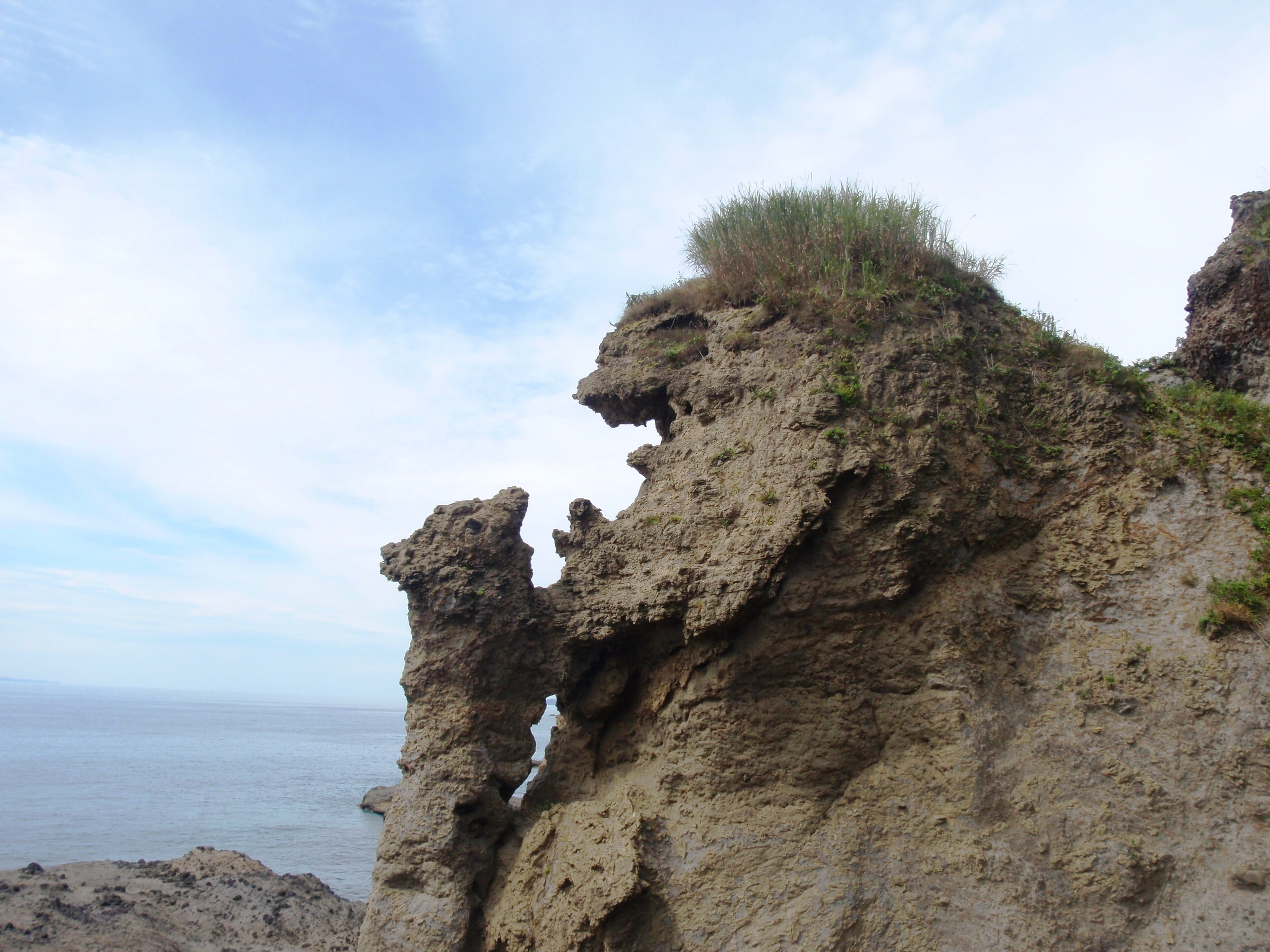
- Parent-child bear rock

- Flag Seal
- Interactive map of Taisei
- Country: Japan
- Region: Hokkaido
- Prefecture: Hokkaido
- Subprefecture: Hiyama
- District: Kudō

Area
  - Total: 133.91 km^{2} (51.70 sq mi)

Population (2004)
  - Total: 2,458
  - Density: 18.36/km^{2} (47.54/sq mi)

Taisei (大成町, Taisei-chō) was a town located in Kudō District, Hiyama Subprefecture, Hokkaido, Japan.

As of 2004, the town had an estimated population of 2,458 and a density of 18.36 persons per km^{2}. The total area was 133.91 km^{2}.

On September 1, 2005, Taisei, along with the town of Kitahiyama (from Setana District) was merged into the expanded town of Setana (formerly from Setana District, now in Kudō District).
