= Nobukazu Kuriki =

Japanese mountaineer (1982–2018)

- 栗城 史多
- Born: June 9, 1982; Imakane, Setana District, Hokkaido, Japan
- Died: May 21, 2018 (aged 35); Mount Everest, Nepal
- Occupations: Mountaineer, entrepreneur
- Agent: Yoshimoto Creative Agency

Nobukazu Kuriki (栗城 史多, Kuriki Nobukazu; June 9, 1982 – May 21, 2018) was a Japanese mountaineer and entrepreneur.

== Early life ==
Kuriki was born in Imakane, Setana District, Hokkaido, Japan. He graduated from Hokkaido Hiyama Kita High School and Sapporo International University's Humanities and Sociology Department of Sociology.

== Mountain climbing ==
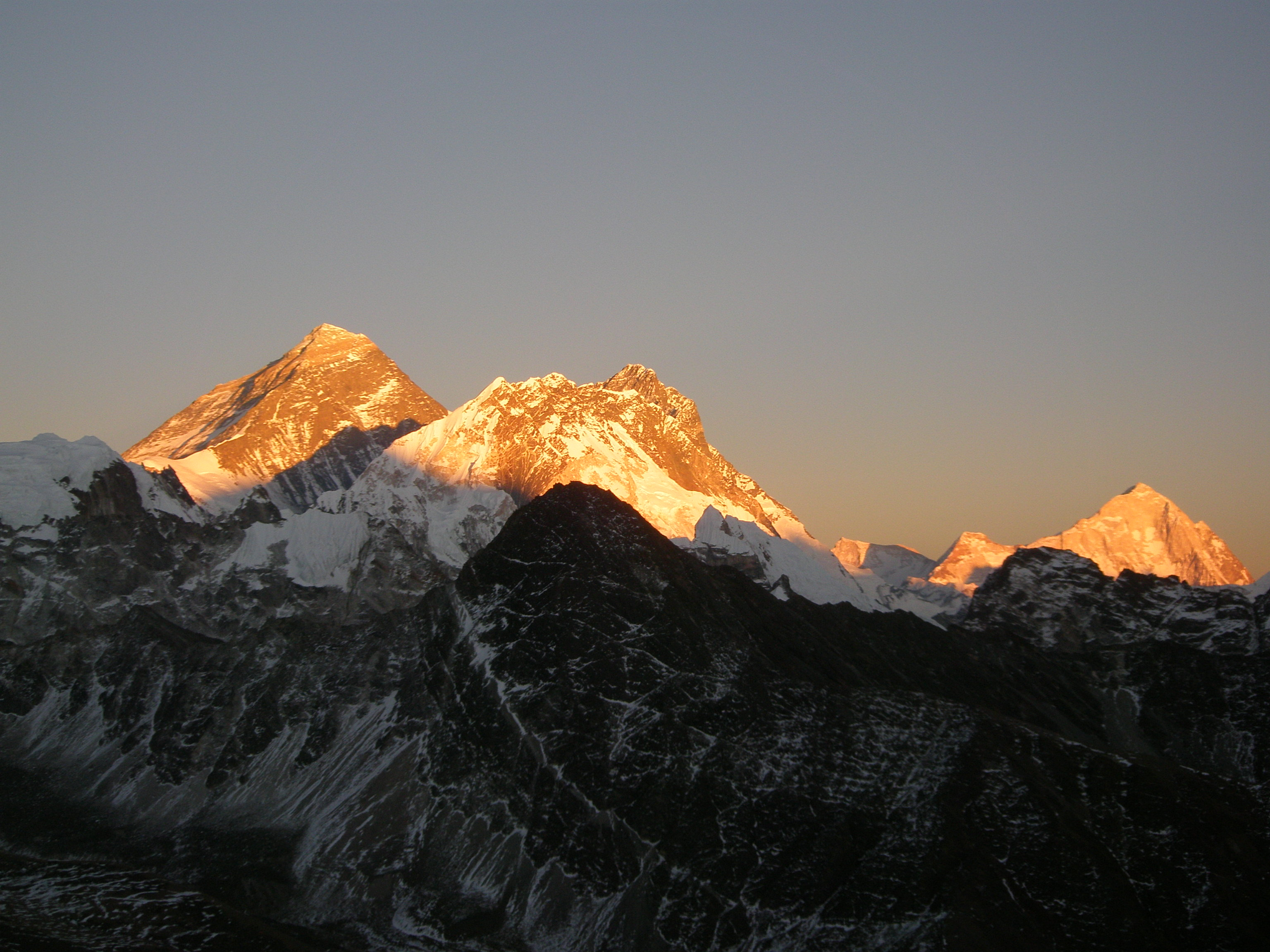
Mount Everest is the peak on the left, viewed from Gokyo Ri.

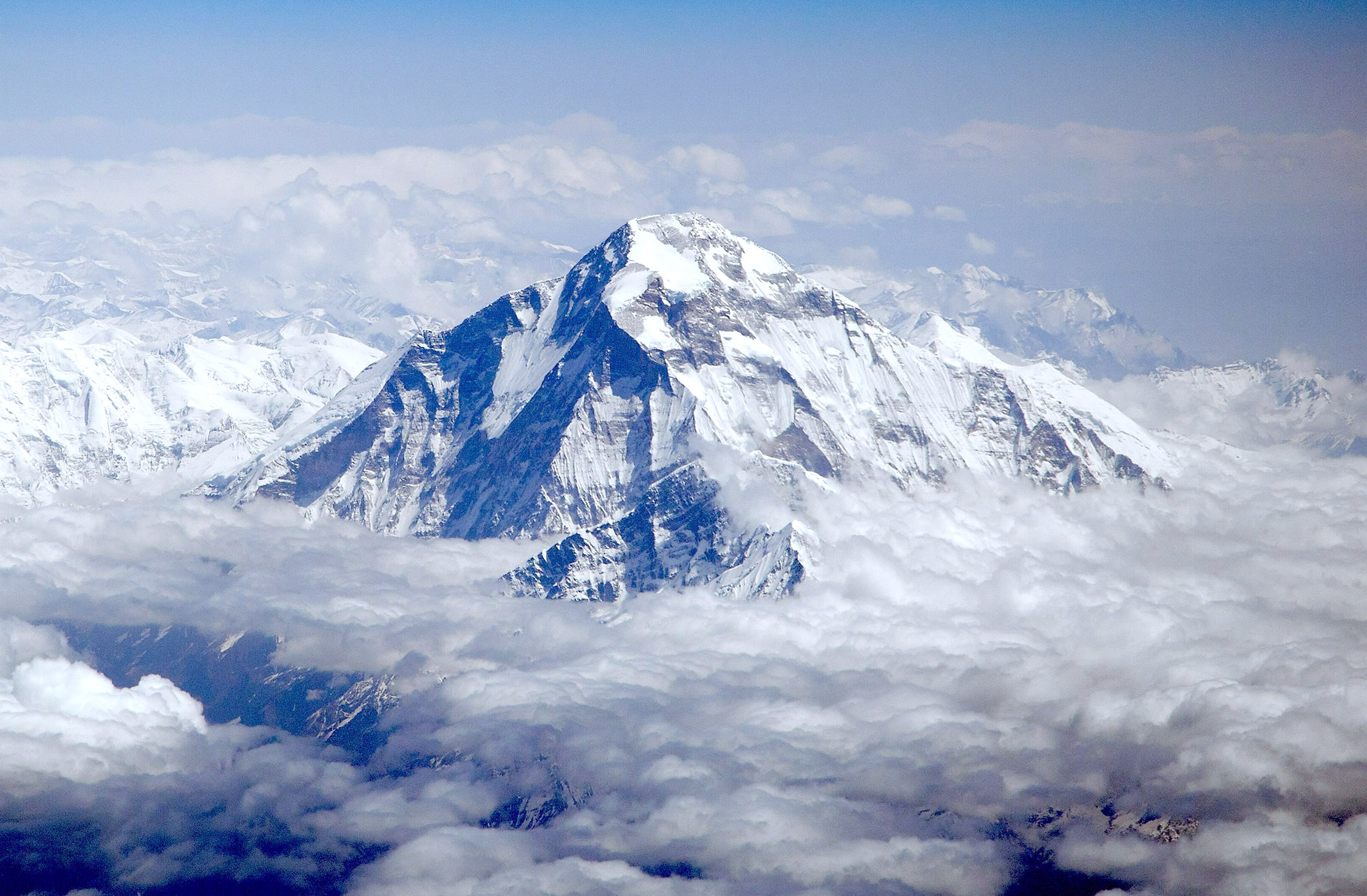
Dhaulagiri, which Kuriki summited in 2009

Kuriki climbed the Himalayas at high altitude once or twice a year. He successfully climbed the 8000 meter peaks Cho Oyu in August 2007 and Dhaulagiri in May 2009. He tried to climb Mount Everest without oxygen while live streaming over the internet, climbing the Tibet side in September 2009, and the Nepal side in September 2010, but was unable to climb above 8,000 meters. In his third time climbing the Nepal side in August to October 2011, Kuriki was not able to reach 7,900 meters. During his fourth attempt in October 2012, he gave up due to the strong wind, and lost nine of his fingers to frostbite after spending two days in a snow hole at temperatures below -20 °C. His 2015 attempt was prevented by the avalanche that struck Everest Base Camp that year, and his attempts in 2016 and 2017 were cut short by weather conditions.

Kuriki advertised his climbing style as "solo without oxygen". However, Kuriki's style was not recognized as "solo without oxygen" by the mountaineering community. He was actually supported by Sherpas and sometimes secretly used oxygen bottles.

He gave well-attended lectures across Japan on the theme of "shared adventure" and the value of perseverance, and attracted numerous social media followers with his online postings, including videos and photos of his climbs.

Kuriki successfully climbed the highest peaks of six continents (the Seven Summits) during his career, including Denali, Aconcagua, Mount Elbrus, Kilimanjaro, the Carstensz Pyramid, and Mount Vinson.

He was represented by the talent agency Yoshimoto Creative Agency.

== Death ==
In May 2018, during his eighth attempt to climb Mount Everest, he died while descending from Camp Three after abandoning the attempt due to illness.

== Filmography ==
=== TV series ===
Year	Title	Network	Notes	Ref.
2008	Taka and Toshi no do o ̄da!	UHB		
2009	The Nonfiction	Fuji TV		
2009	The Net Star	NHK BS2		
2010	7 Summit Kyokugen e no Chōsen	NHK G		
2010	Birth Day	TBS		
2010	Utsukushī Chikyū no Sanka	BS Japan		
2010	Another Sky	NTV		
2010	Arashi ni Shiyagare	NTV		
2010	Itadaki no Kanata e… Nobukazu Kuriki no Chōsen	BS Japan		
2010	Jinsei ga Kawaru 1-funkan no Fukaīhanashi	NTV		
2010	Chikyū no Itadaki e Nobukazu Kuriki Everest Chōsen	TV Tokyo		
2010	Takeshi to Hitoshi	NTV		
2011	Chikyū no Itadaki e Nobukazu Kuriki ta Everest Chōsen: Kanzenhan	TV Tokyo		
2011	Kin'yōbi no Suma-tachi e	TBS		
2011	Harukanaru Itadaki	TV Tokyo		
2012	No Limit Owaranai Chōsen	NHK G		

=== Books ===
Year	Title	Notes
2009	栗城史多 (December 2009). Ippo o Koeru Yūki. サンマーク出版. ISBN 978-4763199799.	Sunmark Publishing
2010	栗城史多 (October 2010). No Limit Jibun o Koeru Hōhō. サンクチュアリ出版. ISBN 978-4861139482.	Sanctuary Publication

=== Music ===
Year	Title	Notes
2010	Re:Birth no No Limit: Yūki o Kimi ni	King Records

== See also ==
- List of people who died climbing Mount Everest
