= Shimamaki, Hokkaido =

Shimamaki 島牧村
- Village
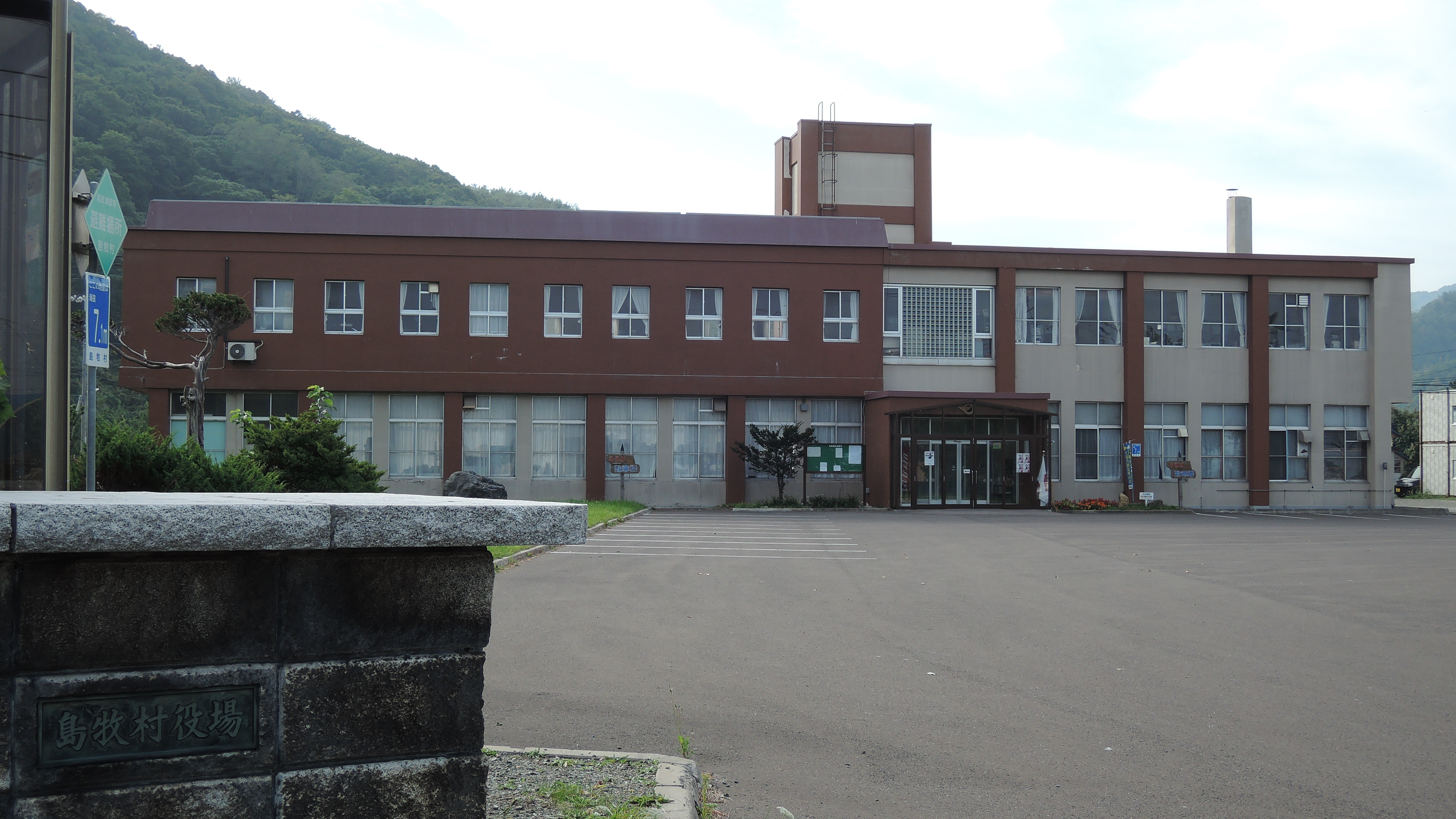
- Shimamaki Village hall

- Flag Seal

- Location of Shimamaki in Hokkaido (Shiribeshi Subprefecture)

- Location in Japan
- Coordinates: 42°42′N 140°4′E
- Country: Japan
- Region: Hokkaido
- Prefecture: Hokkaido (Shiribeshi Subprefecture)
- District: Shimamaki

Government
  - Mayor: Masaru Fujisawa

Area
  - Total: 437.26 km^{2} (168.83 sq mi)

Population (September 30, 2016)
  - Total: 1,560
  - Density: 3.57/km^{2} (9.24/sq mi)
- Time zone: UTC+09:00 (JST)
- City hall address: 83-1, Tomari, Shimamaki, Shimamaki-gun, Hokkaido; 048-0621
- Website: www.vill.shimamaki.lg.jp
- Symbols
- Flower: Leontopodium japonicum
- Tree: Fagus crenata

Shimamaki (島牧村, Shimamaki-mura) is a village located in Shiribeshi Subprefecture, Hokkaido, Japan.

== Population ==
As of September 2016, the village has an estimated population of 1,560. The total area is 437.26 km^{2}.

== Geography ==
Shimamaki is located on the southern of the Shiribeshi Subprefecture. The name is derived from the Ainu word "Shuma-ko-mak", which means "Behind rocks".

=== Neighboring towns ===
- Hiyama Subprefecture
  - Imakane
  - Setana
- Oshima Subprefecture
  - Oshamambe
- Shiribeshi Subprefecture
  - Kuromatsunai
  - Suttsu

== History ==
- 1906: The village of Higashishimamaki and the village of Nishishimamaki were founded.
- 1956: Two villages were merged to form the new village of Shimamaki.

== Industries ==
The main industry of Shimamaki is fishery. Thirty percent of the villagers are engaged in it.

== Education ==
- Elementary school
  - Shimamaki Elementary School
- Junior high school
  - Shimamaki Junior High School
