= List of Japanese prefectures by area =

This is the list of Japanese prefectures by area.

== Prefectures of Japan ranked by area as of October 1, 2015 ==
Figures here are according to the official estimates of Japan. Ranks are given by estimated areas. Undetermined areas here account for domestic boundary regions either in uncertainty or disputed among Japanese prefectures.

Rank	Prefecture	Japanese	Estimated Area (km^{2})	Determined Area (km^{2})	Undetermined Area (km^{2})	Population	Density (/km^{2})	Inhabitable Area		Forest Area (%)	Capital
Rank	Prefecture	Japanese	Estimated Area (km^{2})	Determined Area (km^{2})	Undetermined Area (km^{2})	Population	Density (/km^{2})	(km^{2})	Density (/km^{2})	Forest Area (%)	Capital
1	Hokkaido	北海道	83,424.31	83,424.31		5,381,733	64.51	22,372.86	240.55	63.8%	Sapporo
2	Iwate	岩手県	15,275.01	15,275.01		1,279,594	83.77	3,714.01	344.53	74.9%	Morioka
3	Fukushima	福島県	13,783.74	13,783.74		1,914,039	138.86	4,217.02	453.88	67.9%	Fukushima
4	Nagano	長野県	13,561.56	13,104.29	457.27	2,098,804	154.76	3,225.52	650.69	75.5%	Nagano
5	Niigata	新潟県	12,584.10	10,363.99	2,220.11	2,304,264	183.11	4,535.27	508.08	63.5%	Niigata
6	Akita	秋田県	11,637.54	11,637.54		1,023,119	87.92	3,204.39	319.29	70.5%	Akita
7	Gifu	岐阜県	10,621.29	9,768.57	852.72	2,031,903	191.30	2,211.13	918.94	79.0%	Gifu
8	Aomori	青森県	9,645.59	9,645.59		1,308,265	135.63	3,229.50	405.10	63.8%	Aomori
9	Yamagata	山形県	9,323.15	6,651.83	2,671.32	1,123,891	120.55	2,884.80	389.59	68.7%	Yamagata
10	Kagoshima	鹿児島県	9,186.94	9,042.65	144.29	1,648,177	179.40	3,312.81	497.52	63.4%	Kagoshima
11	Hiroshima	広島県	8,479.45	8,479.45		2,843,990	335.40	2,310.91	1,230.68	71.8%	Hiroshima
12	Hyogo	兵庫県	8,400.96	8,400.96		5,534,800	658.83	2,782.95	1,988.82	66.7%	Kobe
13	Shizuoka	静岡県	7,777.42	7,252.60	524.82	3,700,305	475.78	2,749.49	1,345.82	63.1%	Shizuoka
14	Miyazaki	宮崎県	7,735.31	6,794.24	941.07	1,104,069	142.73	1,849.87	596.84	75.8%	Miyazaki
15	Kumamoto	熊本県	7,409.35	7,272.41	136.94	1,786,170	241.07	2,796.13	638.80	60.4%	Kumamoto
16	Miyagi	宮城県	7,282.22	6,858.62	423.60	2,333,899	320.49	3,154.83	739.79	55.9%	Sendai
17	Okayama	岡山県	7,114.50	7,010.92	103.58	1,921,525	270.09	2,218.89	865.98	68.0%	Okayama
18	Kochi	高知県	7,103.93	7,103.93		728,276	102.52	1,163.18	626.11	83.3%	Kōchi
19	Shimane	島根県	6,708.24	6,708.24		694,352	103.51	1,298.92	534.56	77.5%	Matsue
20	Tochigi	栃木県	6,408.09	6,408.09		1,974,255	308.09	2,982.76	661.89	53.2%	Utsunomiya
21	Gunma	群馬県	6,362.28	6,362.28		1,973,115	310.13	2,279.36	865.64	63.8%	Maebashi
22	Oita	大分県	6,340.71	5,100.28	1,240.43	1,166,338	183.94	1,798.91	648.36	70.6%	Oita
23	Yamaguchi	山口県	6,112.30	6,112.30		1,404,729	229.82	1,706.74	823.05	71.6%	Yamaguchi
24	Ibaraki	茨城県	6,097.06	6,097.06		2,916,976	478.42	3,974.86	733.86	31.0%	Mito
25	Mie	三重県	5,774.40	5,758.66	15.74	1,815,865	314.47	2,059.17	881.84	64.3%	Tsu
26	Ehime	愛媛県	5,676.11	5,676.11		1,385,262	244.05	1,673.14	827.94	70.3%	Matsuyama
27	Aichi	愛知県	5,172.48	5,123.48	49.00	7,483,128	1,446.72	2,987.77	2,504.59	42.2%	Nagoya
28	Chiba	千葉県	5,157.65	5,082.90	74.75	6,222,666	1,206.49	3,554.37	1,750.71	30.4%	Chiba
29	Fukuoka	福岡県	4,986.40	4,854.20	132.20	5,101,556	1,023.09	2,761.41	1,847.45	44.5%	Fukuoka
30	Wakayama	和歌山県	4,724.69	4,724.69		963,579	203.95	1,115.11	864.11	76.4%	Wakayama
31	Kyoto	京都府	4,612.19	4,612.19		2,610,353	565.97	1,173.81	2,223.83	74.2%	Kyoto
32	Yamanashi	山梨県	4,465.27	4,253.95	211.32	834,930	186.98	954.38	874.84	77.8%	Kōfu
33	Toyama	富山県	4,247.61	2,045.94	2,201.67	1,066,328	251.04	1,842.82	578.64	56.6%	Toyama
34	Fukui	福井県	4,190.49	4,190.49		786,740	187.74	1,077.27	730.31	73.9%	Fukui
35	Ishikawa	石川県	4,186.09	4,186.09		1,154,008	275.68	1,391.86	829.11	66.0%	Kanazawa
36	Tokushima	徳島県	4,146.65	4,146.65		755,733	182.25	1,010.20	748.10	75.2%	Tokushima
37	Nagasaki	長崎県	4,132.09	4,132.09		1,377,187	333.29	1,676.17	821.63	58.4%	Nagasaki
38	Shiga	滋賀県	4,017.38	3,766.99	250.39	1,412,916	351.70	1,307.26	1,080.82	50.5%	Ōtsu
39	Saitama	埼玉県	3,797.75	3,767.62	30.13	7,266,534	1,913.38	2,584.64	2,811.43	31.9%	Saitama
40	Nara	奈良県	3,690.94	3,690.94		1,364,316	369.64	855.53	1,594.70	76.8%	Nara
41	Tottori	鳥取県	3,507.05	3,507.05		573,441	163.51	900.75	636.63	73.3%	Tottori
42	Saga	佐賀県	2,440.68	2,440.68		832,832	341.23	1,335.61	623.56	45.2%	Saga
43	Kanagawa	神奈川県	2,415.83	2,415.83		9,126,214	3,777.67	1,470.59	6,205.82	38.8%	Yokohama
44	Okinawa	沖縄県	2,281.12	2,281.12		1,433,566	628.45	1,169.16	1,226.15	46.1%	Naha
45	Tokyo	東京都	2,190.93	2,106.23	84.70	13,515,271	6,168.74	1,418.40	9,528.53	34.8%	Tokyo
46	Osaka	大阪府	1,905.14	1,905.14		8,839,469	4,639.80	1,330.58	6,643.32	30.1%	Osaka
47	Kagawa	香川県	1,876.72	1,862.50	14.22	976,263	520.20	1,005.54	970.88	46.4%	Takamatsu
	Japan	日本国	377,970.75	365,190.44	12,780.27	127,094,745	336.26	122,630.69	1,036.40	64.6%	Tokyo

== Prefectures of Japan ranked by area as of January 1, 1883 ==
Native registered (本籍, honseki) population for January 1, 1883 was calculated based on information of family registries (戸籍, koseki). Areas were calculated based on maps drawn by Inō Tadataka. Ranks are given by estimated areas.

Rank	Prefectures	Japanese	Estimated Area (hōri)	Estimated Area (km^{2})	honseki Population	Density (/km^{2})
1	Sapporo-ken	札幌県	3,245.51	50,057.03	61,144	1.22
2	Nemuro-ken	根室県	2,335.28	36,018.12	5,642	0.16
3	Kagoshima-ken	鹿児島県	1,089.65	16,806.19	1,291,586	76.85
4	Iwate-ken	岩手県	899.19	13,868.63	611,735	44.11
5	Fukushima-ken	福島県	884.33	13,639.44	840,241	61.60
6	Nagano-ken	長野県	853.76	13,167.94	1,033,969	78.52
7	Niigata-ken	新潟県	786.33	12,127.94	1,586,599	130.82
8	Akita-ken	秋田県	754.00	11,629.30	633,203	54.45
9	Gifu-ken	岐阜県	671.45	10,356.09	868,333	83.85
10	Aomori-ken	青森県	607.03	9,362.51	488,505	52.18
11	Yamagata-ken	山形県	600.15	9,256.40	695,533	75.14
12	Hyōgo-ken	兵庫県	556.68	8,585.94	1,433,355	166.94
13	Miyagi-ken	宮城県	540.79	8,340.86	633,194	75.91
14	Ishikawa-ken	石川県	537.13	8,284.41	1,428,073	172.38
15	Hiroshima-ken	広島県	520.78	8,032.24	1,252,811	155.97
16	Hakodate-ken	函館県	514.57	7,936.46	117,063	14.75
17	Shizuoka-ken	静岡県	503.82	7,770.65	985,881	126.87
18	Kumamoto-ken	熊本県	465.47	7,179.16	997,830	138.99
19	Kōchi-ken	高知県	454.72	7,013.36	549,184	78.31
20	Ehime-ken	愛媛県	454.67	7,012.59	1,491,614	212.71
21	Shimane-ken	島根県	435.82	6,721.86	674,984	100.42
22	Okayama-ken	岡山県	420.98	6,492.97	1,029,567	158.57
23	Tochigi-ken	栃木県	411.77	6,350.92	609,000	95.89
24	Gunma-ken	群馬県	407.25	6,281.21	613,410	97.66
25	Ōita-ken	大分県	402.73	6,211.49	746,411	120.17
26	Nagasaki-ken	長崎県	395.23	6,095.82	1,212,157	198.85
27	Yamaguchi-ken	山口県	389.99	6,015.00	897,370	149.19
28	Ibaraki-ken	茨城県	385.16	5,940.50	920,876	155.02
29	Mie-ken	三重県	368.55	5,684.32	870,137	153.08
30	Chiba-ken	千葉県	326.45	5,034.99	1,124,085	223.25
31	Fukuoka-ken	福岡県	317.81	4,901.73	1,128,289	230.18
32	Ōsaka-fu	大阪府	317.14	4,891.40	1,585,696	324.18
33	Aichi-ken	愛知県	312.78	4,824.15	1,354,996	280.88
34	Wakayama-ken	和歌山県	310.62	4,790.84	610,182	127.36
35	Kyōto-fu	京都府	296.55	4,573.83	840,951	183.86
36	Yamanashi-ken	山梨県	289.85	4,470.49	410,246	91.77
37	Fukui-ken	福井県	272.40	4,201.35	582,210	138.58
38	Tokushima-ken	徳島県	271.28	4,184.08	649,616	155.26
39	Saitama-ken	埼玉県	265.84	4,100.18	970,598	236.72
40	Shiga-ken	滋賀県	258.44	3,986.04	639,961	160.55
41	Kanagawa-ken	神奈川県	229.17	3,534.60	800,925	226.60
42	Tottori-ken	鳥取県	224.16	3,457.33	379,747	109.84
43	Okinawa-ken	沖縄県	156.91	2,420.10	360,770	149.07
44	Tōkyō-fu	東京府	52.32	806.96	999,623	1,238.76
	Japan	日本国	24,794.51	382,417.41	37,017,302	96.80

== See also ==
- List of Japanese prefectures by GDP
- List of Japanese prefectures by population
- ISO 3166-2 codes for Japan
- Government of Japan
- Prefectures of Japan
