= Imakane, Hokkaido =

Imakane 今金町
- Town
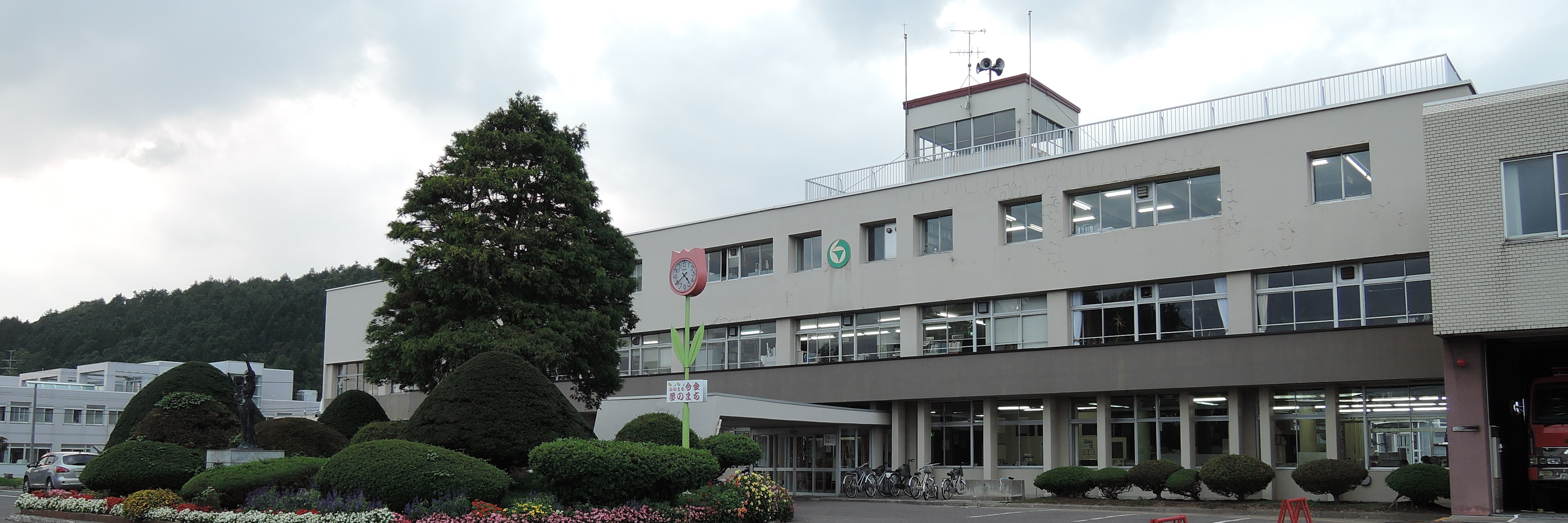
- Imakane Town hall

- Flag Emblem

- Location of Imakane in Hokkaido (Hiyama Subprefecture)

- Location in Japan
- Coordinates: 42°25′N 140°01′E
- Country: Japan
- Region: Hokkaido
- Prefecture: Hokkaido (Hiyama Subprefecture)
- District: Setana

Government
  - Mayor: Hideto Sotozaki

Area
  - Total: 568.14 km^{2} (219.36 sq mi)

Population (September 30, 2016)
  - Total: 5,575
  - Density: 9.813/km^{2} (25.41/sq mi)
- Time zone: UTC+09:00 (JST)
- Climate: Dfb
- Website: www.town.imakane.lg.jp
- Symbols
- Flower: Tulip
- Tree: Japanese yew

Imakane (今金町, Imakane-chō) is a town located in Hiyama Subprefecture, Hokkaido, Japan.

As of September 2016, the town has an estimated population of 5,575 and a density of 9.8 persons per km^{2}. The total area is 568.14 km^{2}.

== Geography ==
Imakane is located in southern Hokkaido within Setana District, Hiyama Subprefecture. The town is on Route 230 at the junction of the Shiribeshi-Toshibetsu and Toshibetsu-Mena rivers. The main landmark and meeting point in the town center is De Molen, a large windmill.

Neighboring towns and village

- Oshamanbe to the east
- Setana to the west
- Shimamaki to the north
- Yakumo to the south east

Mountains

- Mt. Kanikan (カ二カン岳, Kankan-dake) 981 m

Rivers

- Shiribeshi-Toshibetsu River (後志利別川, Shiribeshi-Toshibetsu-gawa)
- Toshibetsu-Mena River

Dams

- Pirika Dam (美利河ダム, Pirika-damu)

=== Climate ===
Climate data for Imakane (1991−2020 normals, extremes 1977−present)
Month	Jan	Feb	Mar	Apr	May	Jun	Jul	Aug	Sep	Oct	Nov	Dec	Year
Record high °C (°F)	8.9 (48.0)	11.1 (52.0)	15.6 (60.1)	26.4 (79.5)	29.1 (84.4)	31.3 (88.3)	33.8 (92.8)	34.8 (94.6)	32.2 (90.0)	24.8 (76.6)	20.1 (68.2)	13.1 (55.6)	34.8 (94.6)
Mean daily maximum °C (°F)	−0.3 (31.5)	0.6 (33.1)	4.3 (39.7)	10.7 (51.3)	16.2 (61.2)	20.2 (68.4)	23.7 (74.7)	25.7 (78.3)	22.7 (72.9)	16.2 (61.2)	8.6 (47.5)	1.9 (35.4)	12.5 (54.6)
Daily mean °C (°F)	−3.6 (25.5)	−3.0 (26.6)	0.3 (32.5)	5.7 (42.3)	11.1 (52.0)	15.4 (59.7)	19.5 (67.1)	21.1 (70.0)	17.1 (62.8)	10.6 (51.1)	4.3 (39.7)	−1.4 (29.5)	8.1 (46.6)
Mean daily minimum °C (°F)	−7.8 (18.0)	−7.5 (18.5)	−4.3 (24.3)	0.5 (32.9)	6.1 (43.0)	11.4 (52.5)	16.2 (61.2)	17.3 (63.1)	11.9 (53.4)	4.9 (40.8)	0.0 (32.0)	−5.0 (23.0)	3.6 (38.6)
Record low °C (°F)	−21.5 (−6.7)	−21.9 (−7.4)	−16.6 (2.1)	−10.0 (14.0)	−2.6 (27.3)	1.5 (34.7)	6.0 (42.8)	6.6 (43.9)	1.0 (33.8)	−3.5 (25.7)	−10.2 (13.6)	−18.2 (−0.8)	−21.9 (−7.4)
Average precipitation mm (inches)	105.0 (4.13)	85.8 (3.38)	71.7 (2.82)	78.6 (3.09)	105.5 (4.15)	74.4 (2.93)	131.4 (5.17)	166.0 (6.54)	151.4 (5.96)	126.3 (4.97)	124.3 (4.89)	121.7 (4.79)	1,336.7 (52.63)
Average snowfall cm (inches)	183 (72)	151 (59)	96 (38)	13 (5.1)	0 (0)	0 (0)	0 (0)	0 (0)	0 (0)	0 (0)	30 (12)	136 (54)	611 (241)
Average rainy days	20.4	17.3	13.7	10.2	10.3	8.5	9.8	10.6	11.5	13.8	16.9	20.5	163.5
Average snowy days	20.9	17.6	13.3	2.1	0	0	0	0	0	0	4.2	16.4	74.5
Mean monthly sunshine hours	26.6	45.1	110.3	168.9	180.8	148.4	119.7	137.2	157.1	133.2	64.7	27.7	1,324.9
Source 1: JMA
Source 2: JMA

== History ==
Imakane, at the time known as Hanaishi, was founded in the Kan'ei period between 1624 and 1643 after gold, silver and manganese were discovered in the upper Shiribetsu River, near Pirika/Hanaishi. Some of the gold mined from the area was used to build Nikkō Tōshō-gū, a Shinto shrine in Tochigi Prefecture dedicated to Tokugawa Ieyasu.

Agate was found in Hanaishi in 1877. Mining was started by Oshima Kanzaemon. Meanwhile, increasing numbers of people arrived in the area to mine existing seams of manganese, gold and silver and by the middle of the Meiji era many had settled in the Shiribetsu river area.

The town was granted independent status as the village of Toshibetsu and formed from the neighboring town of Setana in 1897. It was settled by Norioshi Shikata and 15 other families, including the Imamura and Kanamori houses. These families had arrived in the area during the preceding five years and laid out the town into 129 housing sites, a city hall and a police station.

Toshibetsu village formally received the name of Imakane in 1947 as part of its upgrade to town status. The name was taken from the family names of its two celebrated pioneers, Imamura (今村) and Kanamori (金森).

The town's constitution was established on October 1, 1967. Imakane celebrated its 100th year of autonomous government on July 15, 1997.

== Industry ==
Today Imakane's main industry is farming. Imakane is famous nationwide for potatoes, especially the Danshaku variety. Fishing is also widespread; yamame, ayu, unagi, and iwana can be found in the area.

== Culture ==
Imakane has a number of festivals, including the Snow festival in mid February (usually the weekend after Sapporo's) and the Autumn Festival on September 19 and 20 every year.

== Symbols ==
The symbol of Imakane comprises the meandering Toshibetsu River and the 1st letter of 農耕 (farming) which can be written in katakana as ノ and pronounced "no". This symbol was decided upon by a public competition on the town's 70th anniversary (1967)

Another symbol of Imakane is a large windmill located in the center of town where the old train station stood. It is called "De Moren Imakane". The Name "De Moren" is Dutch for "windmill". In Spring the tulips come into bloom and is one of the symbols for Imakane.

== Schools ==
Due to the steadily decreasing population, a number of schools have closed in recent years, including Yatsuka, Kinbara, Hanaishi and Kamioka elementary schools.

Imakane Junior High School has an exchange program with Burnside High School in Christchurch, New Zealand. Burnside High School students studying Japanese last visited Imakane in July 2016. Seven Imakane students visited Burnside High School in 2013. 2008 marked the 20th anniversary of the mutual exchange between the two groups, and Burnside Vice-Principal Mrs. Hume visited Imakane along with a number of students. Special events were held to mark the occasion, along with the signing of a Friendship agreement between Imakane and Burnside High School.

== Notable people from Imakane ==
- Nobukazu Kuriki, mountaineer and entrepreneur
- Hiroshi Suzuki, bobsledder
- Chiyozakura Teruo, sumo wrestler
