= Setana, Hokkaido =

Setana せたな町
- Town
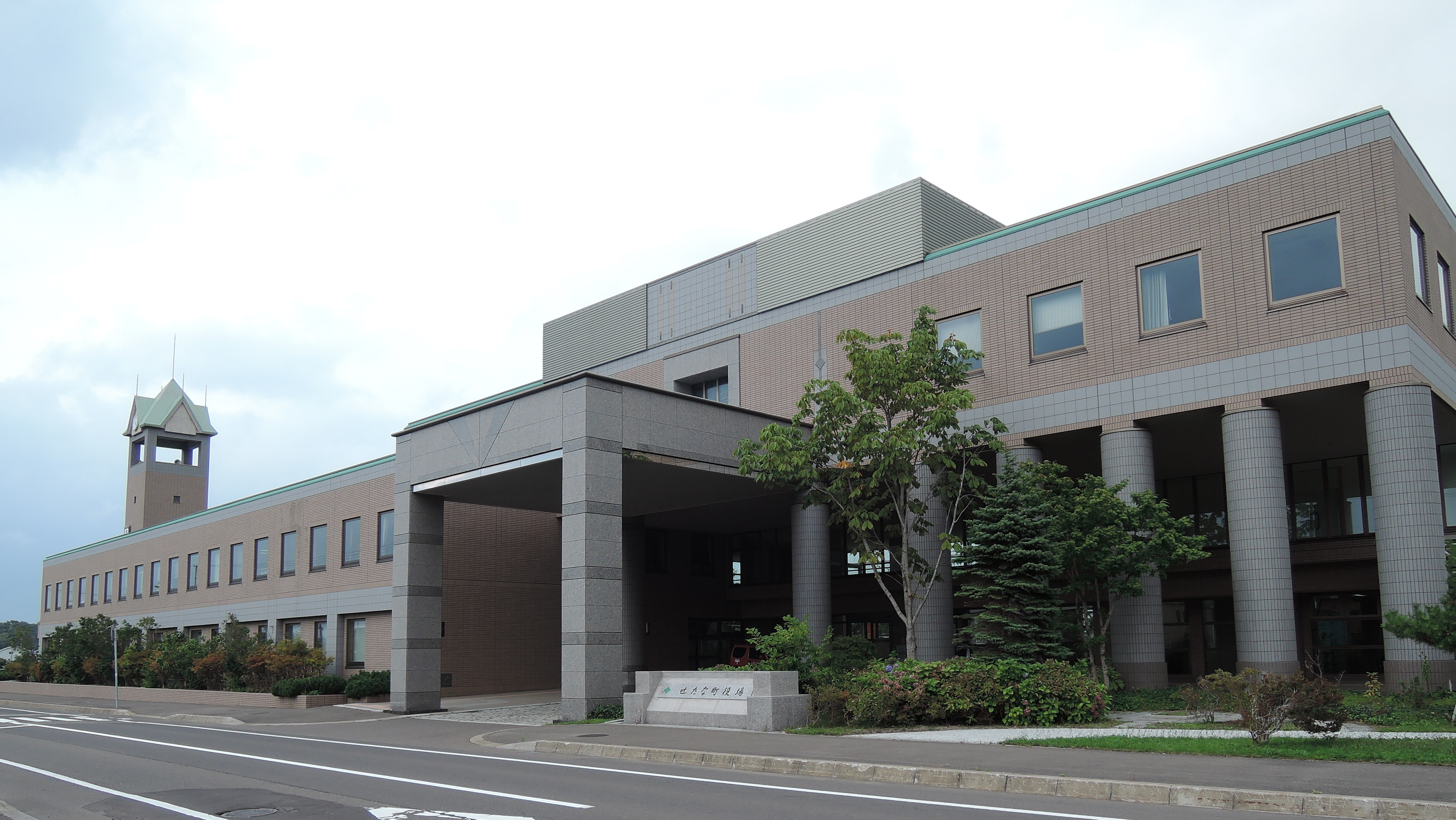
- Setana Town hall

- Flag Seal

- Location of Setana in Hokkaido (Hiyama Subprefecture)

- Location in Japan
- Coordinates: 42°27′N 139°51′E
- Country: Japan
- Region: Hokkaido
- Prefecture: Hokkaido (Hiyama Subprefecture)
- District: Kudō

Government
  - Mayor: Sadamitsu Takahashi

Area
  - Total: 638.67 km^{2} (246.59 sq mi)

Population (September 30, 2016)
  - Total: 8,501
  - Density: 13.31/km^{2} (34.47/sq mi)
- Time zone: UTC+09:00 (JST)
- City hall address: 63-1, Tokushima, Kitahiyama-ku, Setana-chō, Kudō-gun, Hokkaidō; 049-4512
- Climate: Dfb
- Website: www.town.setana.lg.jp

Setana (せたな町, Setana-chō) is a town located in Hiyama Subprefecture, Hokkaido, Japan.

== Population ==
As of September 2016, the town has an estimated population of 8,501, and a density of 13 persons per km^{2}. The total area is 638.67 km^{2}.

== History ==
On September 1, 2005, Setana (瀬棚町) absorbed the town of Kitahiyama, and the town of Taisei, to become the new and expanded town of Setana (せたな町).

- 1902; Setana Village (Setana District) and Kudo Village (Kudo District) became Second Class Villages.
- 1906: Higashisetana Village (Setana District) and Futoro Village (Futoro District) became Second Class Villages.
- 1921: Setana Village became Setana Town.
- 1923: Kaitorima Village (Kudo District) was founded.
- 1953: Higashisetana Village became Higashisetana Town.
- 1955:
  - Higashisetana Town and Futoro Village were merged to form the new town of Kitahiyama (Setana District).
  - Kudo Village and Kaitorima Village were merged to form the new village of Taisei (Kudo District).
- 1966: Taisei Village became Taisei Town.
- 1987: Setana Line was abolished.
- 2005: Setana Town, Kitahiyama Town, and Taisei Town were merged to form the new town of Setana (Kudo District).

== Geography ==
Setana is located on the northern Hiyama Subprefecture and faces the Sea of Japan. The Shiribeshi-Toshibetsu River flows through the center of the town.

The sole off-shore wind farm in Japan is at Setana, however, it only has two turbines.

=== Neighboring municipalities ===
- Hiyama Subprefecture
  - Imakane
- Oshima Subprefecture
  - Yakumo
- Shiribeshi Subprefecture
  - Shimamaki

=== Climate ===
Climate data for Setana, Hokkaido (1991−2020 normals, extremes 1976−present)
Month	Jan	Feb	Mar	Apr	May	Jun	Jul	Aug	Sep	Oct	Nov	Dec	Year
Record high °C (°F)	9.3 (48.7)	11.1 (52.0)	16.0 (60.8)	23.5 (74.3)	27.1 (80.8)	31.7 (89.1)	31.6 (88.9)	32.8 (91.0)	31.8 (89.2)	24.7 (76.5)	19.6 (67.3)	14.0 (57.2)	32.8 (91.0)
Mean daily maximum °C (°F)	0.6 (33.1)	1.2 (34.2)	4.8 (40.6)	10.4 (50.7)	15.1 (59.2)	19.0 (66.2)	23.0 (73.4)	25.1 (77.2)	22.4 (72.3)	16.4 (61.5)	9.5 (49.1)	3.0 (37.4)	12.5 (54.6)
Daily mean °C (°F)	−1.9 (28.6)	−1.4 (29.5)	1.7 (35.1)	6.5 (43.7)	11.1 (52.0)	15.3 (59.5)	19.5 (67.1)	21.4 (70.5)	18.2 (64.8)	12.4 (54.3)	6.1 (43.0)	0.3 (32.5)	9.1 (48.4)
Mean daily minimum °C (°F)	−4.7 (23.5)	−4.4 (24.1)	−1.6 (29.1)	2.4 (36.3)	7.2 (45.0)	12.0 (53.6)	16.8 (62.2)	18.2 (64.8)	13.9 (57.0)	7.9 (46.2)	2.5 (36.5)	−2.5 (27.5)	5.6 (42.2)
Record low °C (°F)	−16.2 (2.8)	−15.3 (4.5)	−11.6 (11.1)	−5.0 (23.0)	−1.5 (29.3)	2.3 (36.1)	6.9 (44.4)	9.1 (48.4)	3.0 (37.4)	−1.1 (30.0)	−6.5 (20.3)	−12.0 (10.4)	−16.2 (2.8)
Average precipitation mm (inches)	53.7 (2.11)	48.3 (1.90)	51.1 (2.01)	68.8 (2.71)	94.9 (3.74)	67.3 (2.65)	116.3 (4.58)	145.5 (5.73)	145.4 (5.72)	104.6 (4.12)	99.1 (3.90)	72.0 (2.83)	1,070.7 (42.15)
Average rainy days	13.9	11.6	10.8	9.8	10.0	7.7	9.4	9.6	11.1	13.0	14.3	14.0	135.2
Mean monthly sunshine hours	26.4	47.6	122.7	177.4	192.7	167.6	147.4	172.3	173.2	136.0	66.1	29.8	1,459.3
Source 1: JMA
Source 2: JMA

== Sister City ==
- Hanford, California, United States
  - The Hanford-Setana Sister City Program is symbolized by the "Bridging of Waters" seal which promotes extending international friendship. Each city participates by sending a delegate committee overseas each year. The group usually consists of prominent city citizens and a group of local high school students. Setana High School sends their entire upper class as delegates. The Setana group travels to Hanford in the winter while the Hanford group travels to Setana in the summer.

== Education ==
- High schools
  - Hokkaido Hiyamakita High School

== Notable people from Setana ==
- Kitaseumi Hiromitsu, former sumo wrestler
- Daiju Hisateru, former sumo wrestler
