= Kitahiyama, Hokkaido =

Dissolved municipality in Hokkaidō, Japan

Kitahiyama 北檜山町 きたひやまちょう
- Town
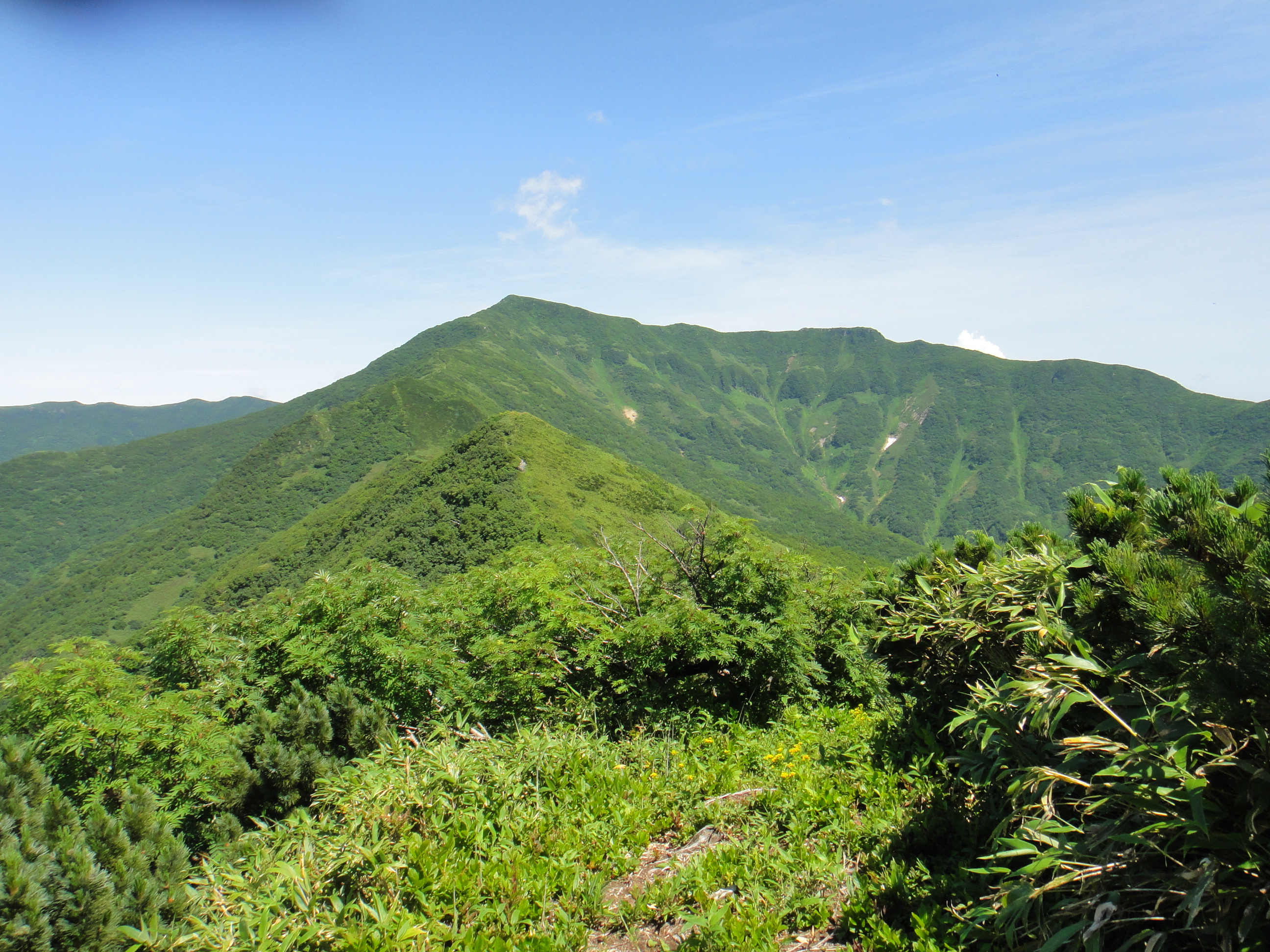
- Mount Kariba

- Flag Seal
- Interactive map of Kitahiyama
- Country: Japan
- Region: Hokkaido
- Prefecture: Hokkaido
- Subprefecture: Hiyama
- District: Setana

Area
  - Total: 379.03 km^{2} (146.34 sq mi)

Population (2004)
  - Total: 5,907
  - Density: 15.58/km^{2} (40.36/sq mi)

Kitahiyama (北檜山町, Kitahiyama-chō) was a town located in Setana District, Hiyama Subprefecture, Hokkaido, Japan.

As of 2004, the town had an estimated population of 5,908 and a density of 15.59 persons per km^{2}. The total area was 379.03 km^{2}.

On September 1, 2005, Kitahiyama, along with the town of Taisei (from Kudō District) was merged into the expanded town of Setana (formerly from Setana District, now in Kudō District).
