= Kudō District, Hokkaido =

District in Hokkaido, Japan

Coordinates: 42°14′49″N 139°59′13″E

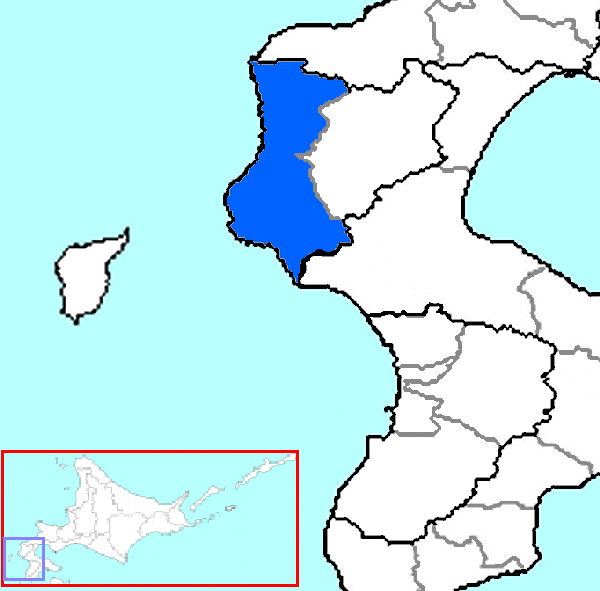
The area of Kudo District in Hiyama Subprefecture.

Kudō (久遠郡, Kudō-gun) is a district located in Hiyama Subprefecture, Hokkaido, Japan.

As of 2004, the district has an estimated population of 2,458 and a density of 18.36 persons per km^{2}. The total area is 133.91 km^{2}.

== Towns and villages ==
- Setana (Taisei and Kitahiyama were merged into Setana in 2005)
