= Hiyama Subprefecture =

Hiyama Subprefecture 檜山振興局
- Hiyama-shinkō-kyoku
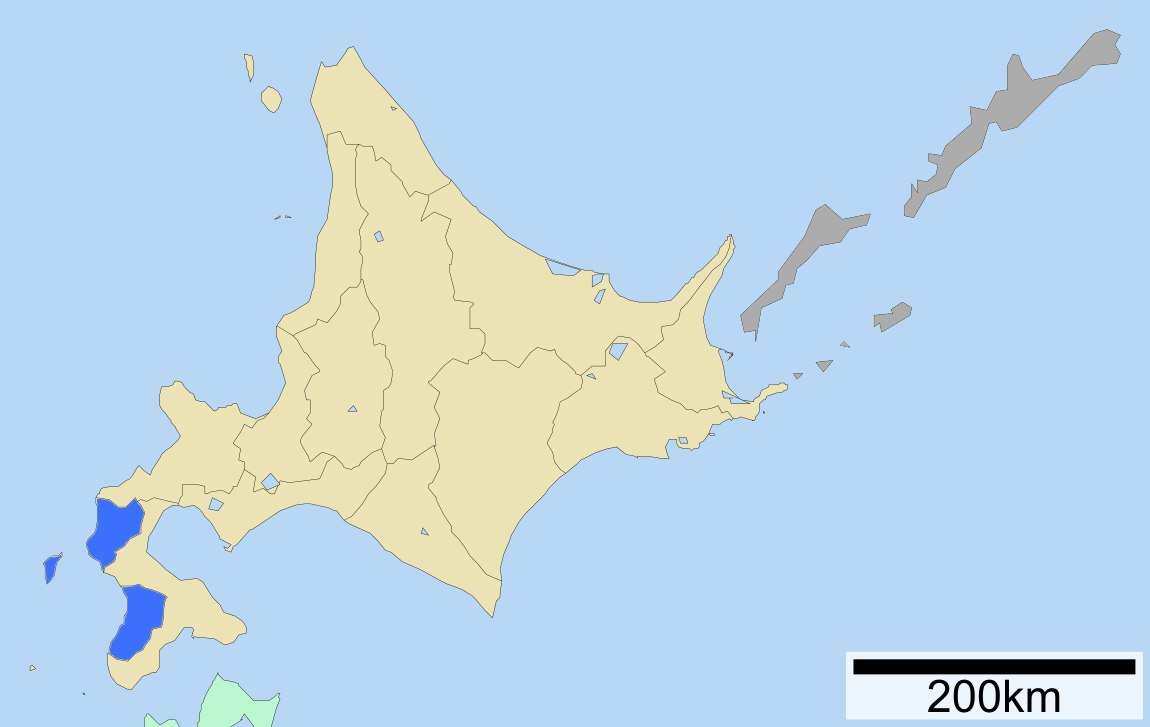
- Prefecture: Hokkaido
- Capital: Esashi

Area
  - Total: 2,629.88 km^{2} (1,015.40 sq mi)

Population (March 2009)
  - Total: 46,999
  - Density: 18/km^{2} (46/sq mi)
- Website: http://www.hiyama.pref.hokkaido.lg.jp/

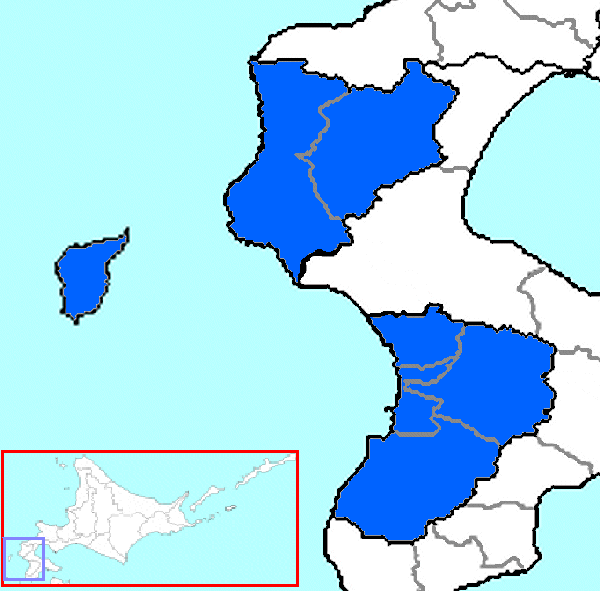
Hiyama Subprefecture

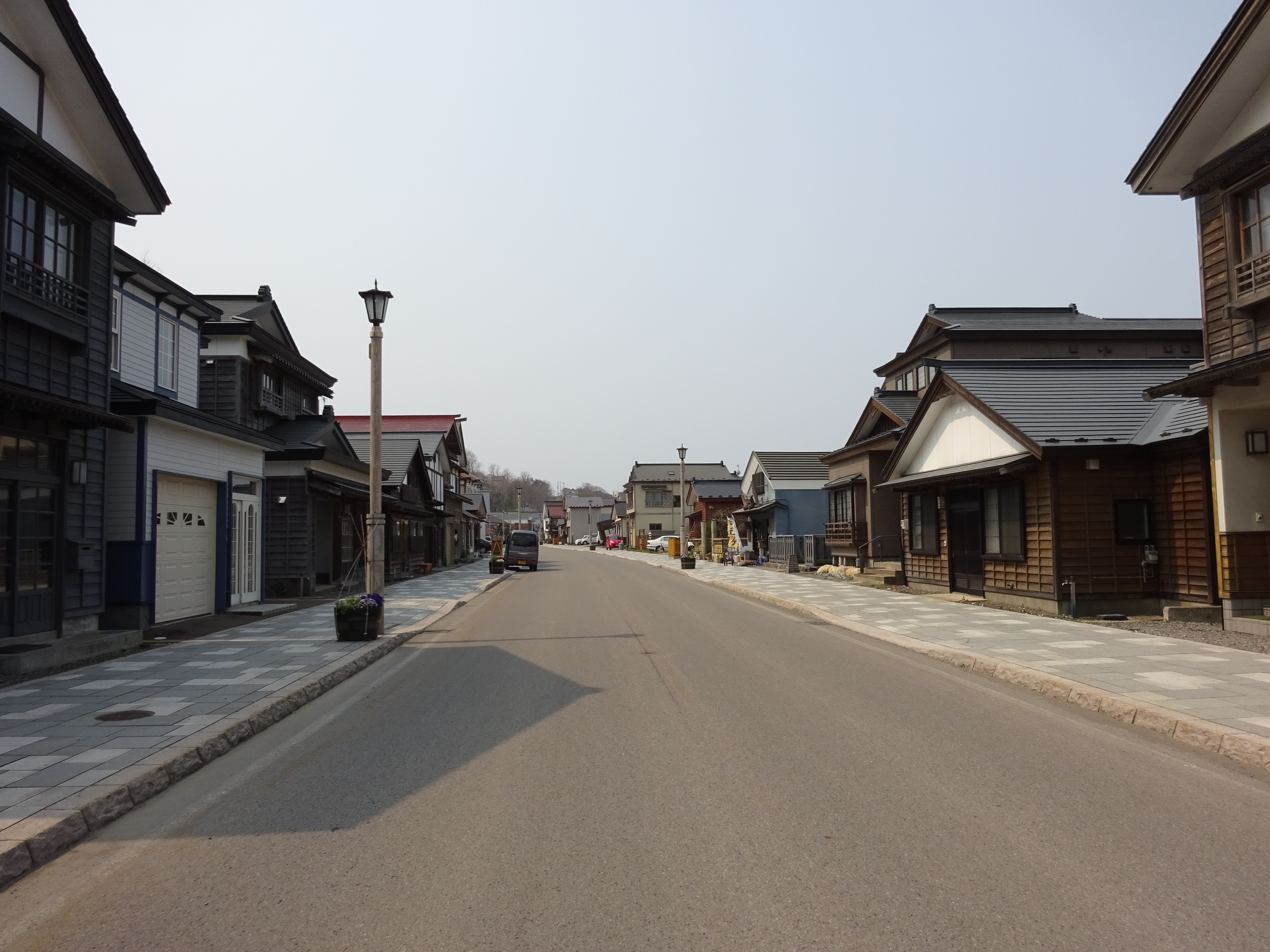
Esashi

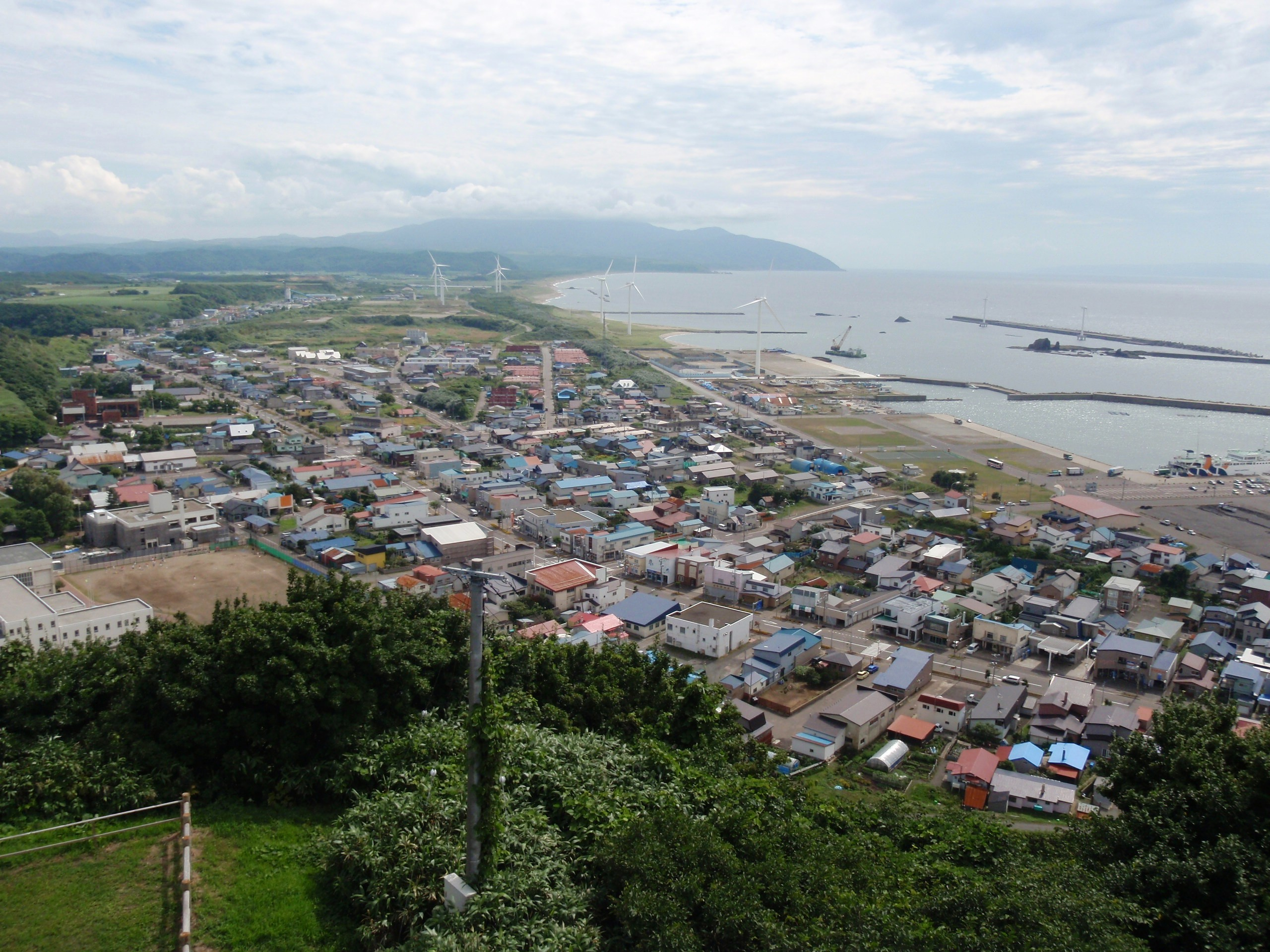
Setana

Hiyama Subprefecture (檜山振興局, Hiyama-shinkō-kyoku) is a subprefecture of Hokkaido Prefecture, Japan located on the Oshima Peninsula on the Sea of Japan side. It includes Okushiri Island. It was established in 1897.

== Geography ==
=== Municipalities ===
Name		Area (km^{2})	Population	Pop. Density	District	Type	Map
Rōmaji	Kanji	Area (km^{2})	Population	Pop. Density	District	Type	Map
Assabu	厚沢部町	460.58	3,884	8.43	Hiyama District	Town	
Esashi (capital)	江差町	109.57	8,117	74.08	Hiyama District	Town	
Imakane	今金町	568.14	5,575	9.81	Setana District	Town	
Kaminokuni	上ノ国町	547.58	5,161	9.43	Hiyama District	Town	
Okushiri	奥尻町	142.98	2,812	19.67	Okushiri District	Town	
Otobe	乙部町	162.55	3,925	24.15	Nishi District	Town	
Setana	せたな町	638.67	8,501	13.31	Kudō District	Town	

== History ==
- 1897: Hiyama Subprefecture was established.
- 2005: Kumaishi Town (Nishi District) was merged with Yakumo Town (Yamakoshi District, Oshima Subprefecture) and transferred to Oshima Subprefecture. At the same time, Hiyama Subprefecture was divided between north and south.
- 2014: Esashi Line (from Kikonai Station to Esashi Station) was abolished. Therefore, Hiyama Subprefecture became the only subprefecture in which there is no railway.
