= Setana District, Hokkaido =

District in Hokkaido, Japan

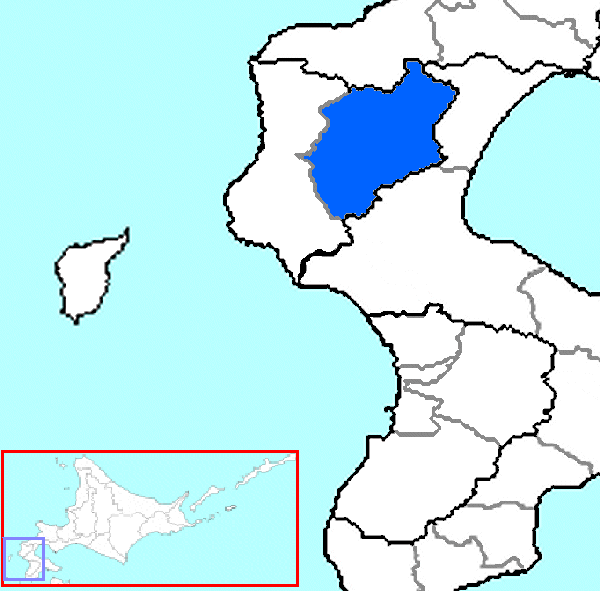
The area of Setana District in Hiyama Subprefecture.

Setana (瀬棚郡, Setana-gun) is a district located in Hiyama Subprefecture, Hokkaido, Japan.

== Population ==
As of 2004, the district has an estimated population of 15,173 and a density of 14.14 persons per km^{2}. The total area is 1,072.86 km^{2}.

== Towns and villages ==
- Imakane42°25′46″N 140°00′31″E
