= Iwamatsu Dam =

Dam in Hokkaidō Prefecture, Japan

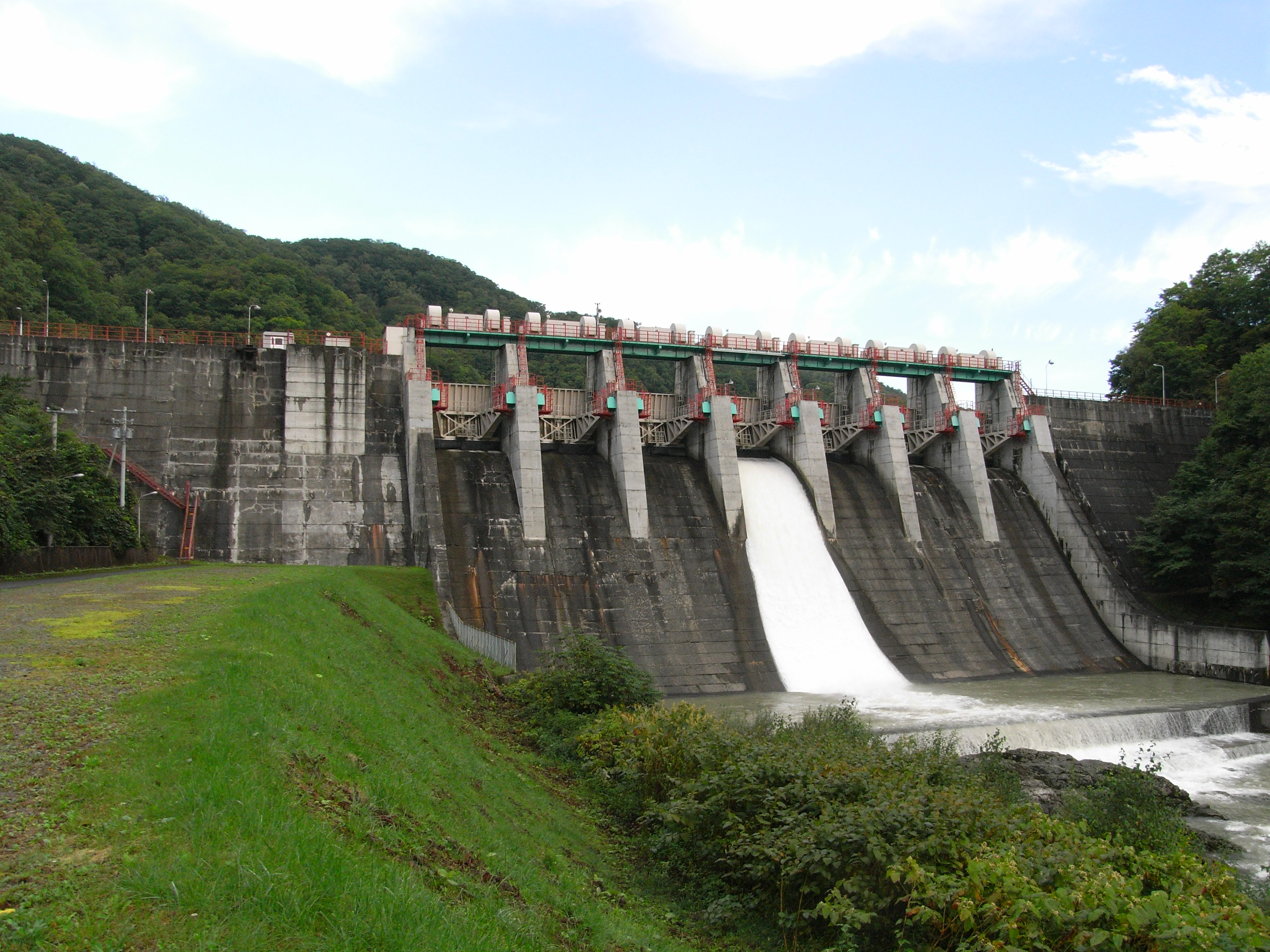
- Interactive map of Iwamatsu Dam
- Location: Hokkaidō, Japan.
- Coordinates: 43°11′49″N 142°56′11″E
- Construction began: 1939
- Opening date: 1941

Dam and spillways
- Impounds: Tokachi River
- Height: 37.2 m
- Length: 190.5 m

Reservoir
- Total capacity: 9,026,000 m^{3}
- Catchment area: 788 km^{2}
- Surface area: 102 hectares

The Iwamatsu Dam (岩松ダム) is a dam situated in Hokkaidō, Japan. Work began on the dam's construction in 1939. The construction was completed in 1941.

== Location ==
The Iwamatsu Dam is located at latitude N 43°111' 49 and longitude E 142°56' 11.

== Dam Details ==
Iwamatsu Dam is Concrete Gravity dam 37.2 meters high. Its crest is 190.5 meters long. The dam's volume is 78 thousand m3. The total catchment area of the dam is 788km2. The dam has a total water surface area of 102ha. The dam's reservoir can hold a maximum of 9026 thousand m3 of water.

== Purpose ==
The dam was a constructed to serve a variety of purposes. Among its main functions are agricultural irrigation, flood control, water supply for industry, river flow maintenance, hydropower generation, recreation and water supply. The dam can generate up to 12,000 kW of Hydroelectric power.
