= List of mergers in Hokkaido =

Here is a list of mergers in Hokkaido, Japan since the Heisei period (1989 onward).

== Okhotsk (Abashiri) Subprefecture ==
- On October 1, 2005 - the towns of Ikutahara, Engaru, and Maruseppu and the village of Shirataki (all from Monbetsu District) merged into expanded town of Engaru.
- On March 5, 2006 - the towns of Rubeshibe, Tanno and Tokoro (all from Tokoro District) merged into the expanded city of Kitami.
- On March 31, 2006 - the town of Memanbetsu and the village of Higashimokoto (both from Abashiri District) merged to create the new town of Ōzora.
- On October 5, 2009 - the town of Kamiyūbetsu (from Monbetsu District) merged into the expanded town of Yūbetsu.

== Hidaka Subprefecture ==
- On March 1, 2006 - the town of Monbetsu (from Saru District) merged into the town of Hidaka.
- On March 31, 2006 - the town of Mitsuishi (from Mitsuishi District) and Shizunai (from Shizunai District) to create the new town of Shinhidaka (in the newly created Hidaka District). Mitsuishi District and Shizunai District were both dissolved with this merger.

== Hiyama Subprefecture ==
- On September 1, 2005 - the town of Taisei (from Kudō District) merged with the towns of Setana and Kitahiyama (both from Setana District) to create the town of Setana (now in Kudō District).
- On October 1, 2005 - the town of Kumaishi (from Nishi District, Hiyama Subprefecture) merged with the town of Yakumo (from Yamakoshi District, Oshima Subprefecture) to create the new town of Yakumo (in the newly created Futami District). The former town of Kumaishi transferred to Oshima Subprefecture at the same time.

== Iburi Subprefecture ==
- On March 1, 2006 - the village of Ōtaki (from Usu District) merged into the city of Date.
- On March 27, 2006 - the towns of Hayakita and Oiwake (both from Yūfutsu (Iburi) District) merged to create the new town of Abira.
- On March 27, 2006 - the towns of Hobetsu (from Yūfutsu (Iburi) District) merged into the expanded town of Mukawa (now with a different writing).
- On March 27, 2006 - the towns of Abuta and Tōya (both from Abuta (Iburi) District) merged to create the new town of Tōyako.

== Ishikari Subprefecture ==
- On October 1, 2005 - the villages of Atsuta (from Atsuta District) and Hamamasu (from Hamamasu District) merged into the expanded city of Ishikari. Atsuta District and Hamamasu District were both dissolved with this merger.

== Kamikawa Subprefecture ==
- On September 1, 2005 - the town of Asahi (from Kamikawa (Teshio) District) merged into the expanded city of Shibetsu.
- On March 27, 2006 - the town of Fūren (from Kamikawa (Teshio) District) merged into the expanded city of Nayoro.

== Kushiro Subprefecture ==
- On October 11, 2005 - the towns of Akan (from Akan District) and Onbetsu (from Shiranuka District) merged into the expanded city of Kushiro.

== Nemuro Subprefecture ==
- There were no mergers during the 2000s in this subprefecture.

== Oshima Subprefecture ==
- On December 1, 2004 - the town of Minamikayabe (from Kayabe District), and the towns of Esan and Toi, and the village of Todohokke (all from Kameda District) merged into the expanded city of Hakodate.
- On April 1, 2005 - the town of Sawara (from Kayabe District) merged into the expanded town of Mori.
- On October 1, 2005 - the town of Yakumo (from Yamakoshi District, Oshima Subprefecture) merged with the town of Kumaishi (from Nishi District in Hiyama Subprefecture) to create the new town of Yakumo (in the newly created Futami District). The former town of Kumaishi transferred Oshima Subprefecture at the same time.
- On February 1, 2006 - the town of Kamiiso (from Kamiiso District), and the town of Ōno (from Kameda District) merged to create the new city of Hokuto.

== Rumoi Subprefecture ==
- There were no mergers during the 2000s in this subprefecture.

== Shiribeshi Subprefecture ==
- There were no mergers during the 2000s in this subprefecture.

== Sorachi Subprefecture ==
- On March 27, 2006 - the town of Kurisawa, and the village of Kita (both from Sorachi District) merged into the expanded city of Iwamizawa.

== Sōya Subprefecture ==
- On March 20, 2006 - the town of Utanobori (from Esashi District) merged into the expanded town of Esashi.

== Tokachi Subprefecture ==
- On February 6, 2006 - the village of Chūrui (from Hiroo District) merged into the expanded town of Makubetsu (in Nakagawa (Tokachi) District).
