= Yūbetsu =

Yūbetsu (Japanese: 湧別) can refer to several things:

- Yūbetsu, Hokkaido, a town in Hokkaido, Japan.
- Yūbetsu River, a river in Hokkaidō, Japan
- Yubetsu technique, a technique to make microblades, used in Upper Paleolithic
- JS Yūbetsu (FFM-8), a frigate of the Japan Maritime Self-Defense Force
- JS Yūbetsu (DE-228), a Yūbari-class destroyer escort of the Japanese Maritime Self-Defense Force
