= Yūbetsu River =

River in Hokkaidō, Japan

Yūbetsu River 湧別川
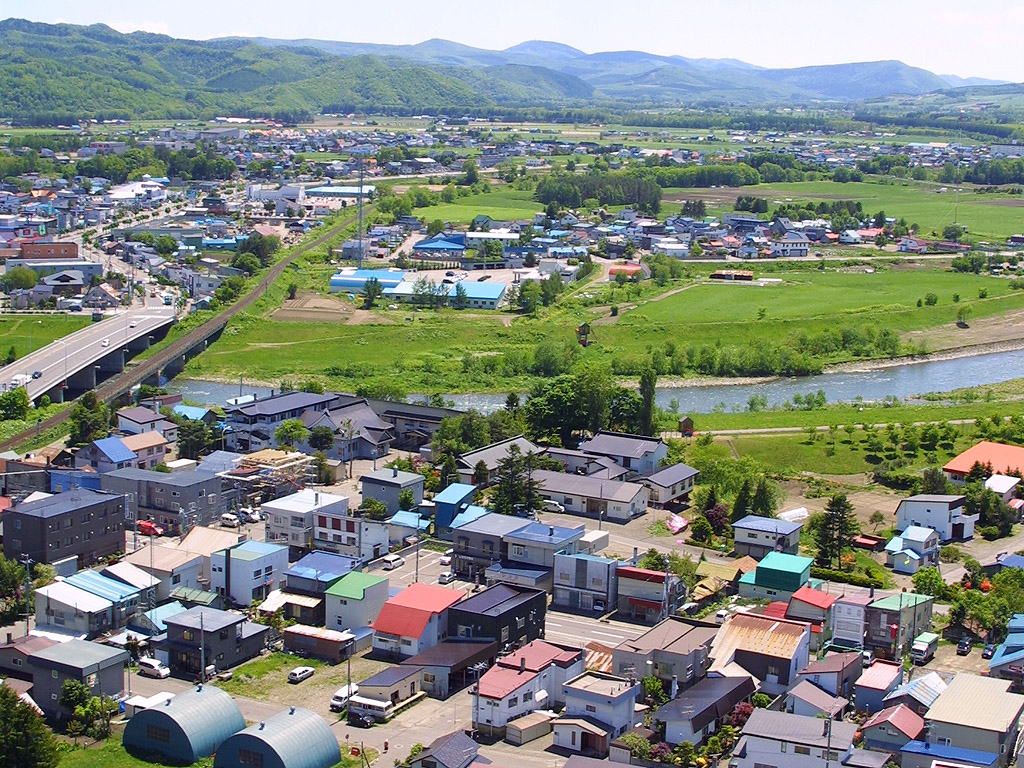

- Location within Japan
- Native name: Yūbetsu-gawa (Japanese)

Location
- Country: Japan
- State: Hokkaido
- Region: Okhotsk
- District: Monbetsu
- Municipalities: Engaru, Kamiyūbetsu, Yūbetsu

Physical characteristics
- Source: Mount Tengu (Ishikari)
  - location: Engaru, Hokkaido, Japan
  - coordinates: 43°49′2″N 143°3′38″E
  - elevation: 1,553 m (5,095 ft)
- Mouth: Sea of Okhotsk
  - location: Yūbetsu, Hokkaido, Japan
  - coordinates: 44°13′56″N 143°37′16″E
  - elevation: 0 m (0 ft)
- Length: 87 km (54 mi)
- Basin size: 1,480 km^{2} (570 sq mi)
- Discharge
  - average: 33.56 m^{3}/s (1,185 cu ft/s)

The Yūbetsu River (湧別川, Yūbetsu-gawa) is a Class A river in Hokkaido, Japan.

As of 2005, some 34,000 people live in its watershed of 1,480 square kilometres (570 mi^{2}).

== Course ==
The Yūbetsu River rises in the Kitami Mountains on the slopes of Mount Tengu. The river travels some 87 kilometres (54 mi) to the Sea of Okhotsk.
