= Engaru =

Engaru 遠軽町
- Town
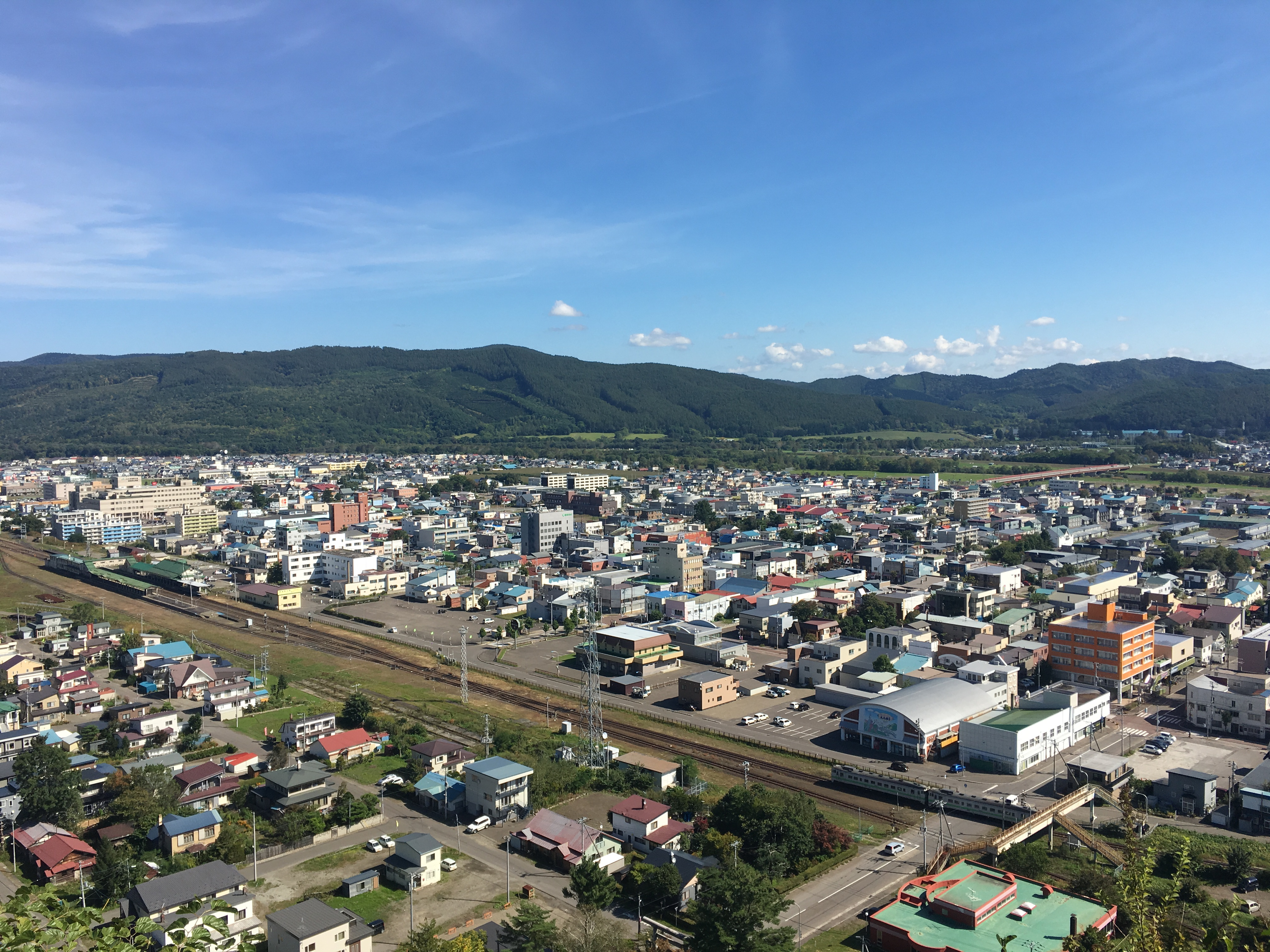

- Flag Emblem

- Location of Engaru in Hokkaido (Okhotsk Subprefecture)

- Location in Japan Location in Hokkaido
- Coordinates: 44°4′N 143°32′E
- Country: Japan
- Region: Hokkaido
- Prefecture: Hokkaido (Okhotsk Subprefecture)
- District: Mombetsu

Area
  - Total: 1,332.32 km^{2} (514.41 sq mi)

Population (October, 2025)
  - Total: 17,619
  - Density: 13.224/km^{2} (34.251/sq mi)
- Time zone: UTC+09:00 (JST)
- City hall address: 1-1 1 Jō-Kita 3chōme, Engaru-chō, Hokkaido; 099-0403
- Climate: Dfb
- Website: engaru.jp
- Symbols
- Flower: Sunflower
- Tree: Sargent's cherry

Engaru (遠軽町, Engaru-chō) is a town in the Okhotsk subprefecture of Hokkaido, Japan. The name comes from the Ainu place name Inkar-us-i ("overlook-always doing-place"), meaning a lookout point.

On October 1, 2005, the towns of Ikutahara and Maruseppu, and the village of Shirataki, all from Monbetsu District merged into the expanded town of Engaru. As of October 2025, the town has an estimated population of 17,619. The total area is 1,332.32 square kilometres (514.41 sq mi), making it the fifth largest municipality in Hokkaido.

Engaru is known as the place where Aikido originated, in the Shirataki area. It is also where the largest cosmos flower park in Japan is located. An Upper Paleolithic site at Shirataki Site Group is the source of some Yubetsu technique stone blades dating from approximately 13,000 years ago.

== History ==
- 1869: Current town area was part of the Wakayama Domain (or Kishū Domain) jurisdiction. There were expanses of plains.
- 1896: The Church of Christ in Japan established the Hokkaido Comrades Education Association, and planned a Christian university at Engaru.
- 1897: On 7 May, the first immigrant party of the Hokkaido Comrades Education Association arrived in Engaru, the first party to immigrate at Engaru. But the final construction of the university's plan did not materialize.
- 1919: The village of Engaru is split off from Kamiyūbetsu (now the town of Yūbetsu).
- 1925: The village of Ikutahara split off, becoming its own town in 1934.
- 1934: Engaru becomes a town.
- 1946: The villages of Maruseppu (later becoming a town) and Shirataki are split off.
- 2005: The towns of Engaru, Ikutahara, Maruseppu, and the village of Shirataki merge to form the new town of Engaru.

== Notable geography ==
- Mountains: Mt. Murii, 1,876 metres (6,155 ft); Mt. Hirayama, 1,771 metres (5,810 ft); Mt. Shiyūbetsu, 1,688 metres (5,538 ft); Mt. Chitokaniushi, 1,446 metres (4,744 ft); Mt. Kitami-Fuji, 1,306 metres (4,285 ft)
- Major rivers: Yūbetsu River; Ikutahara River; Maruseppu River; Setose River; Shanafuchi River; Murii River
- Waterfalls: Yamabiko no Taki, Rokumei no Taki, Jūsan no Taki, Shirataki
- Others: Gambōiwa (瞰望岩), a rocky hill made of underwater lava of andesitic (hyaloclastite) which was spewn out from an underwater volcano in the Miocene Epoch of the Neogene Period in the Cenozoic Era (about 7 million years ago) with volcanic sandstone conglomerate. The top of the cliff is about 78 metres (256 ft) high.

== Demographics ==
Per Japanese census data, the population of Engaru has declined steadily in recent decades.

Historical population
Year	Pop.	±%
1970	33,330	—
1980	30,428	−8.7%
1990	26,735	−12.1%
2000	24,844	−7.1%
2010	22,265	−10.4%
2020	19,241	−13.6%

== Economy ==
=== Industry ===
The major industries are commercial forestry, wood processing, and agriculture.

In the past, Engaru Station was the intersection of the Nayoro Main Line (closed in 1989) and the Sekihoku Main Line. It had an important position in business and overall development.

== Climate ==
According to the Köppen climate classification, Engaru has a humid continental climate (Dfb) with warm, rainy summers and extremely snowy, long, and cold winters.

Climate data for Engaru, Hokkaido (1991−2020 normals, extremes 1978−present)
Month	Jan	Feb	Mar	Apr	May	Jun	Jul	Aug	Sep	Oct	Nov	Dec	Year
Record high °C (°F)	9.8 (49.6)	16.5 (61.7)	20.0 (68.0)	30.9 (87.6)	37.7 (99.9)	36.9 (98.4)	37.4 (99.3)	36.7 (98.1)	33.3 (91.9)	29.7 (85.5)	22.8 (73.0)	16.6 (61.9)	37.7 (99.9)
Mean daily maximum °C (°F)	−2.3 (27.9)	−1.6 (29.1)	3.0 (37.4)	10.6 (51.1)	17.3 (63.1)	20.6 (69.1)	24.2 (75.6)	25.2 (77.4)	21.7 (71.1)	15.4 (59.7)	7.5 (45.5)	0.2 (32.4)	11.8 (53.3)
Daily mean °C (°F)	−8.0 (17.6)	−7.7 (18.1)	−2.4 (27.7)	4.6 (40.3)	10.7 (51.3)	14.6 (58.3)	18.6 (65.5)	19.7 (67.5)	15.7 (60.3)	9.0 (48.2)	2.2 (36.0)	−5.0 (23.0)	6.0 (42.8)
Mean daily minimum °C (°F)	−14.7 (5.5)	−15.2 (4.6)	−8.7 (16.3)	−1.4 (29.5)	4.4 (39.9)	9.4 (48.9)	14.0 (57.2)	15.3 (59.5)	10.4 (50.7)	3.3 (37.9)	−2.8 (27.0)	−10.8 (12.6)	0.3 (32.5)
Record low °C (°F)	−29.2 (−20.6)	−29.5 (−21.1)	−26.2 (−15.2)	−18.1 (−0.6)	−5.0 (23.0)	−0.6 (30.9)	3.7 (38.7)	5.6 (42.1)	0.7 (33.3)	−5.2 (22.6)	−16.6 (2.1)	−23.9 (−11.0)	−29.5 (−21.1)
Average precipitation mm (inches)	53.4 (2.10)	34.0 (1.34)	34.6 (1.36)	42.4 (1.67)	56.1 (2.21)	66.3 (2.61)	109.3 (4.30)	135.9 (5.35)	123.1 (4.85)	88.2 (3.47)	55.0 (2.17)	62.3 (2.45)	870.6 (34.28)
Average snowfall cm (inches)	144 (57)	119 (47)	103 (41)	26 (10)	2 (0.8)	0 (0)	0 (0)	0 (0)	0 (0)	0 (0)	25 (9.8)	112 (44)	531 (209)
Average precipitation days (≥ 1.0 mm)	10.7	9.7	9.8	9.2	9.5	9.8	11.1	11.8	11.0	10.1	10.1	10.8	123.6
Average snowy days (≥ 3 cm)	14.6	13.1	12.4	3.0	0.2	0	0	0	0	0	2.6	11.9	57.8
Mean monthly sunshine hours	85.1	102.2	141.6	165.4	174.7	156.9	150.0	142.9	155.2	148.0	111.3	89.7	1,626.3
Source: Japan Meteorological Agency

== Gallery ==
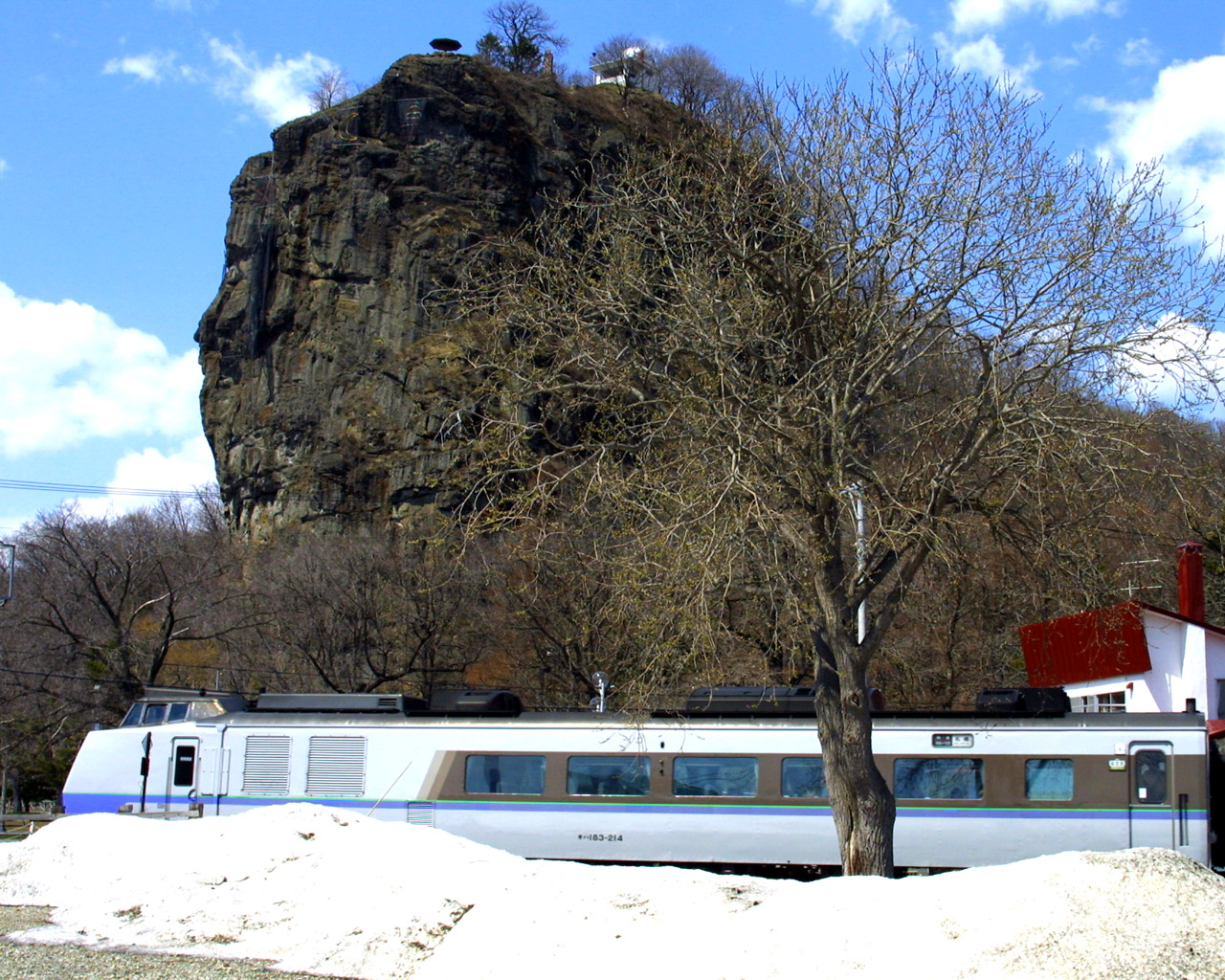
Gambōiwa

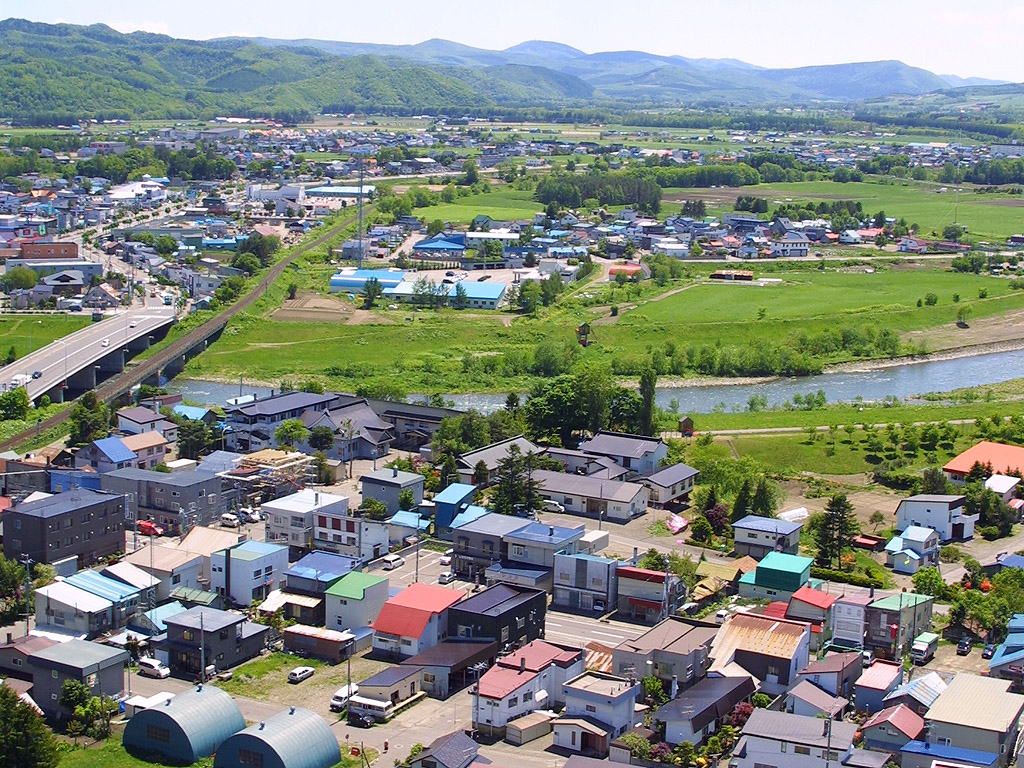
View from Gambōiwa

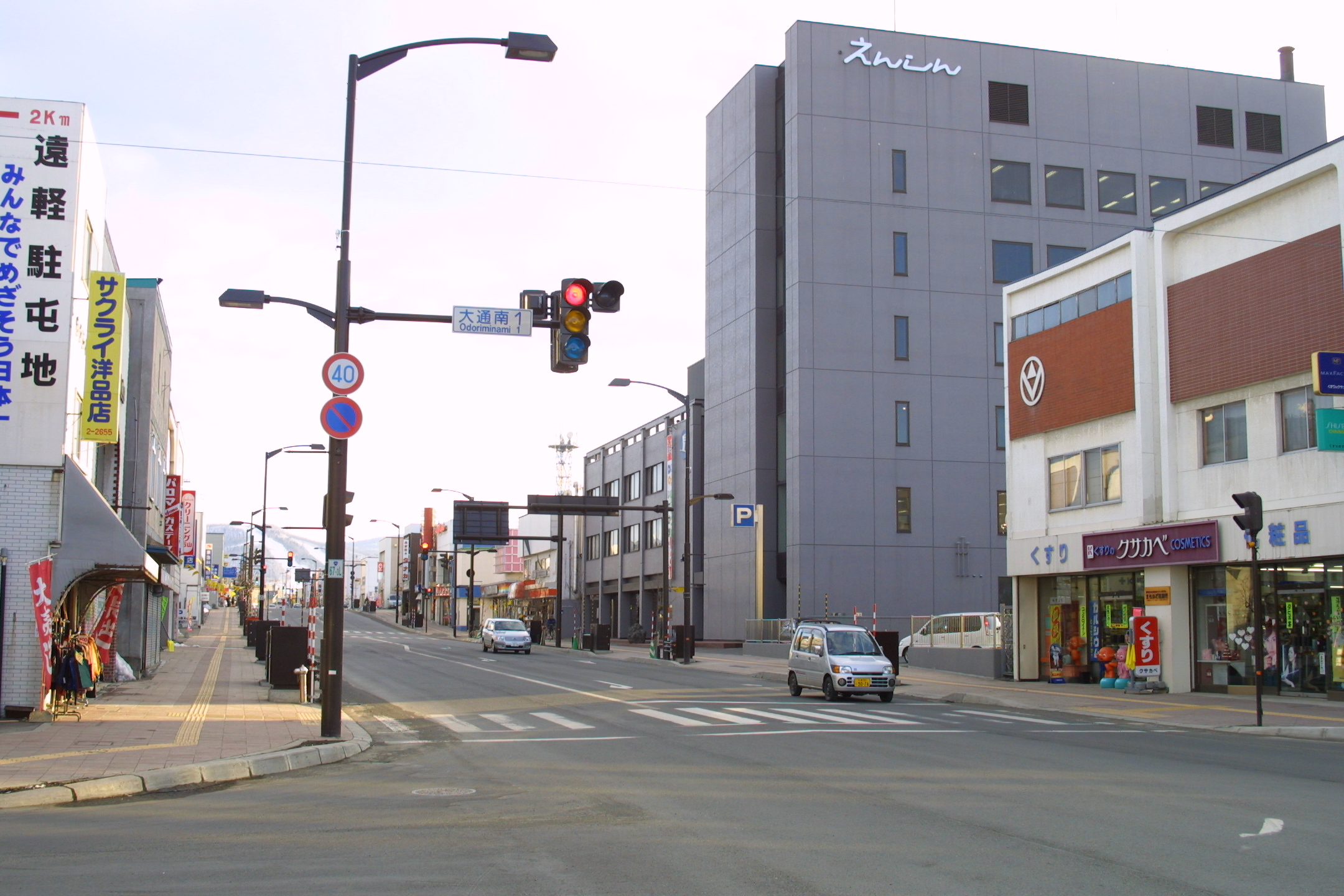
Town area in front of Engaru Station

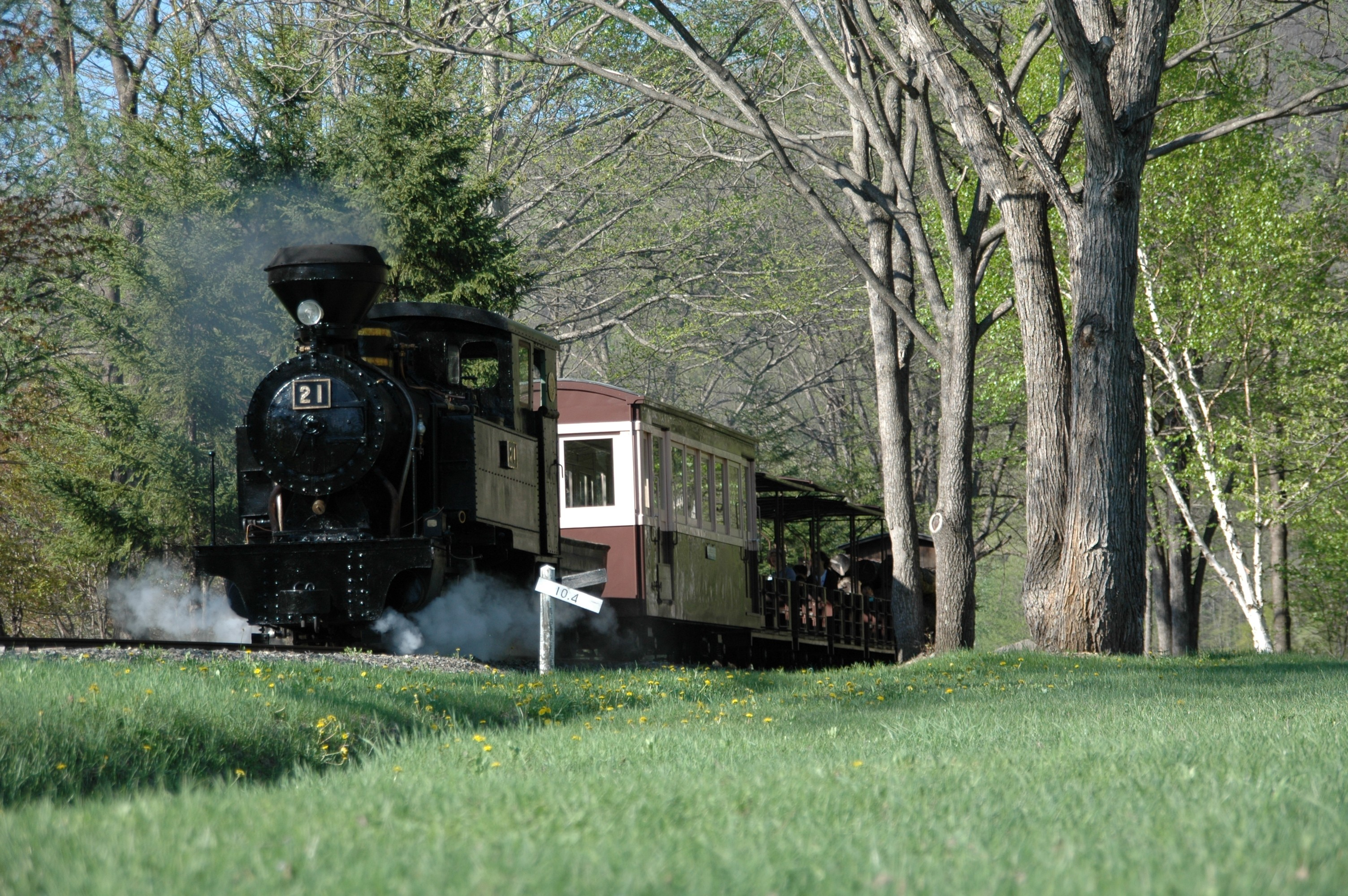
Preserved forest railway locomotive at Maruseppu

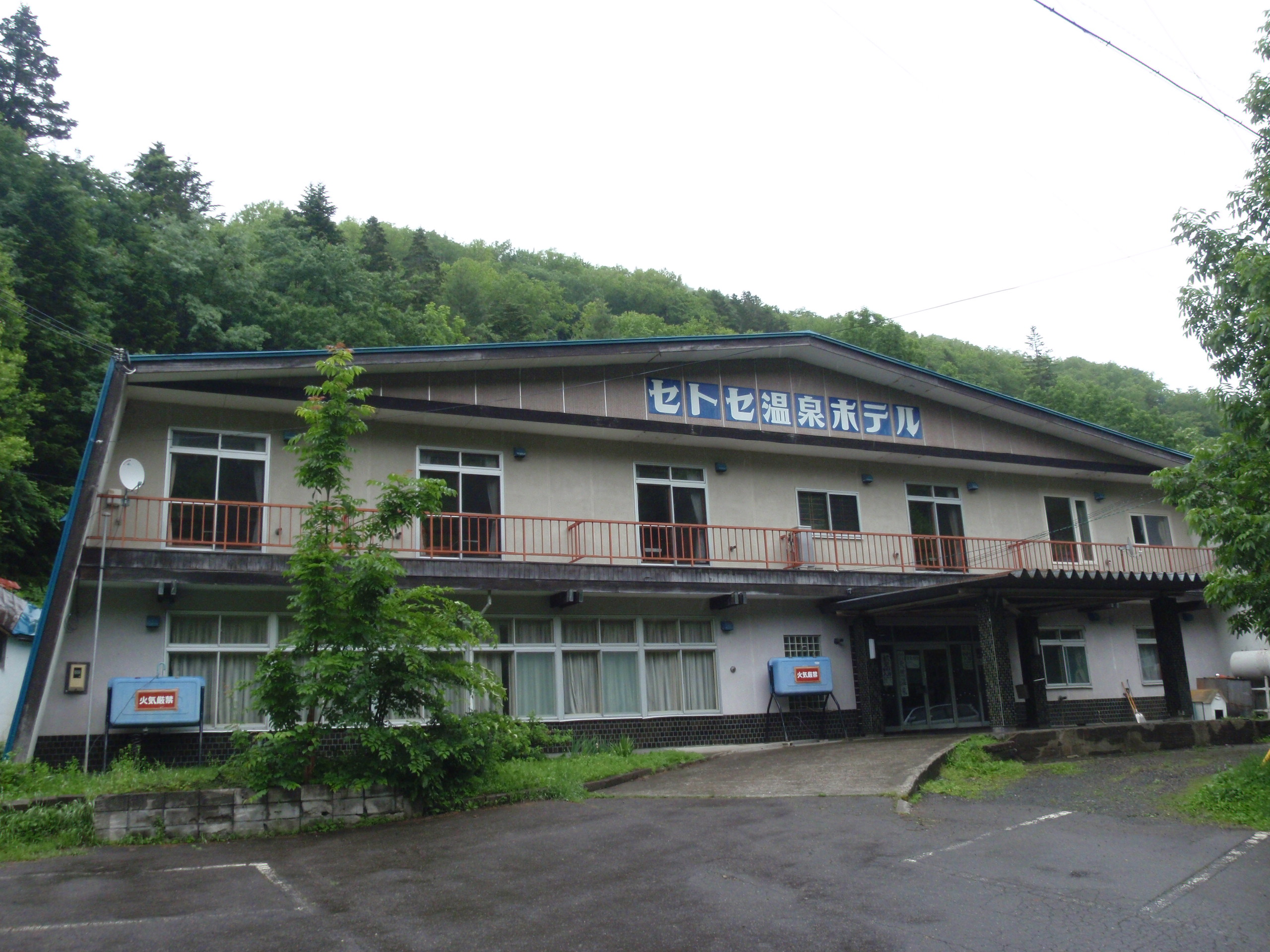
Setose Spa

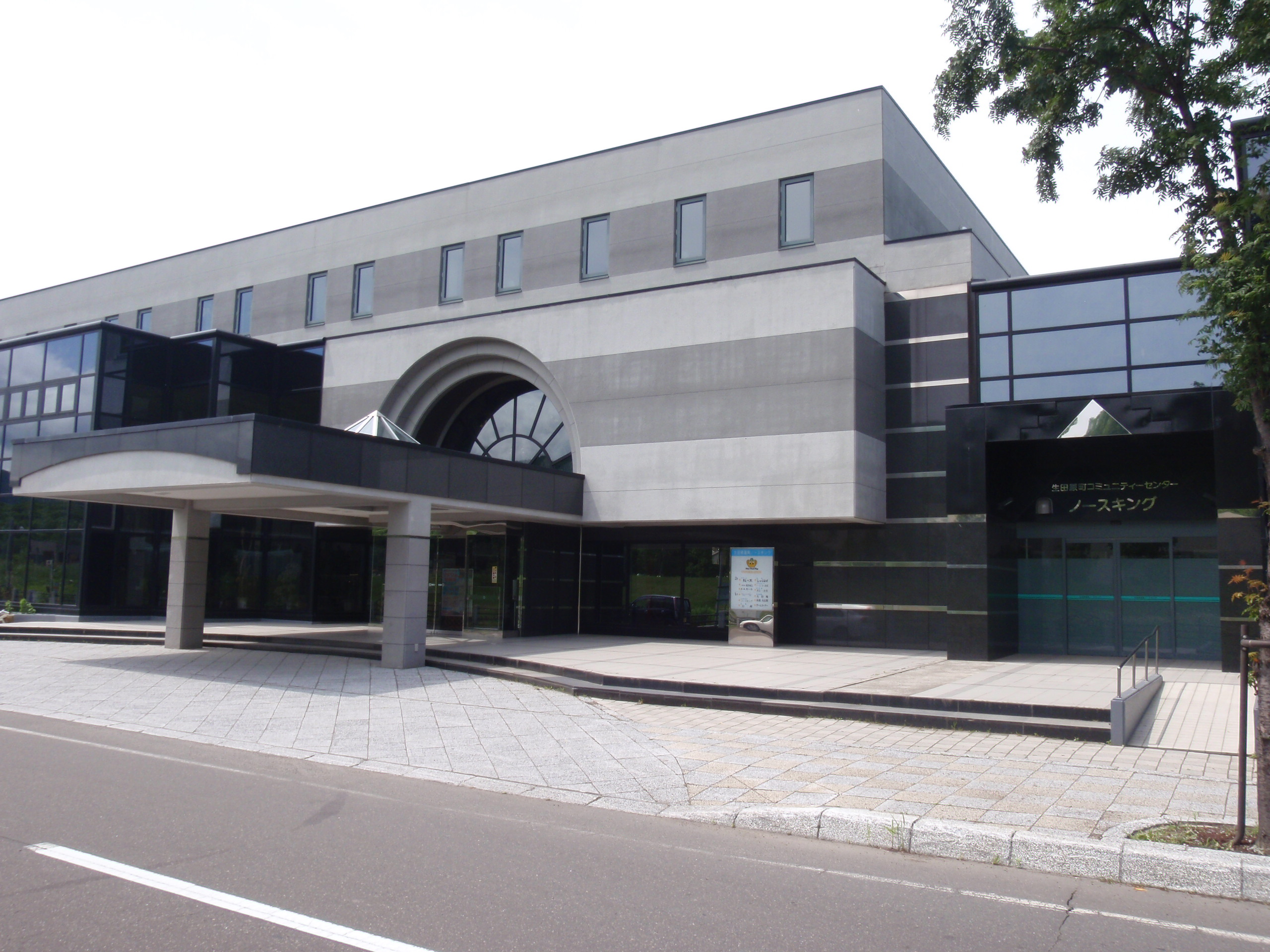
Ikutahara Spa "North King"

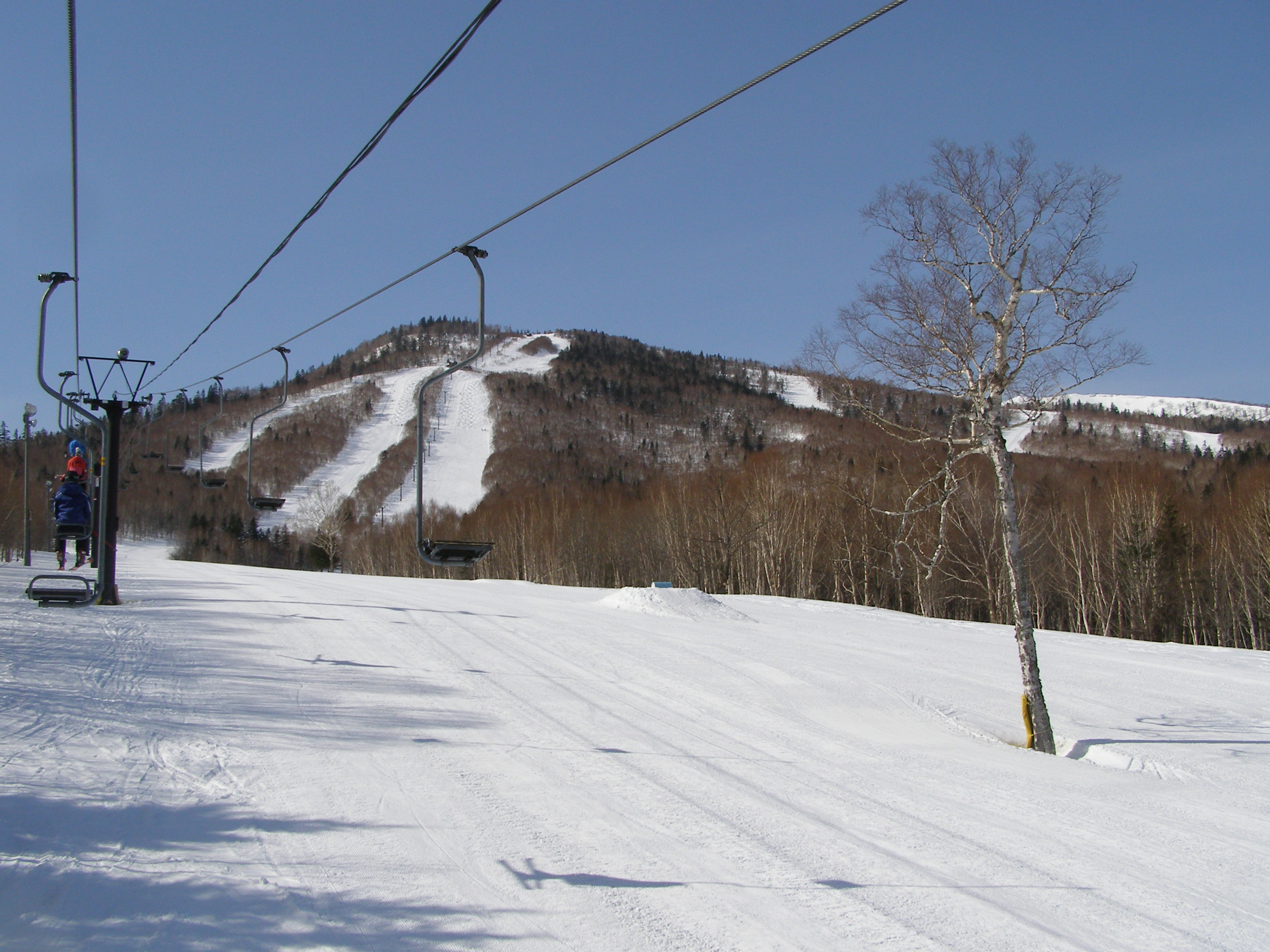
Kita-Taisetsu ski area

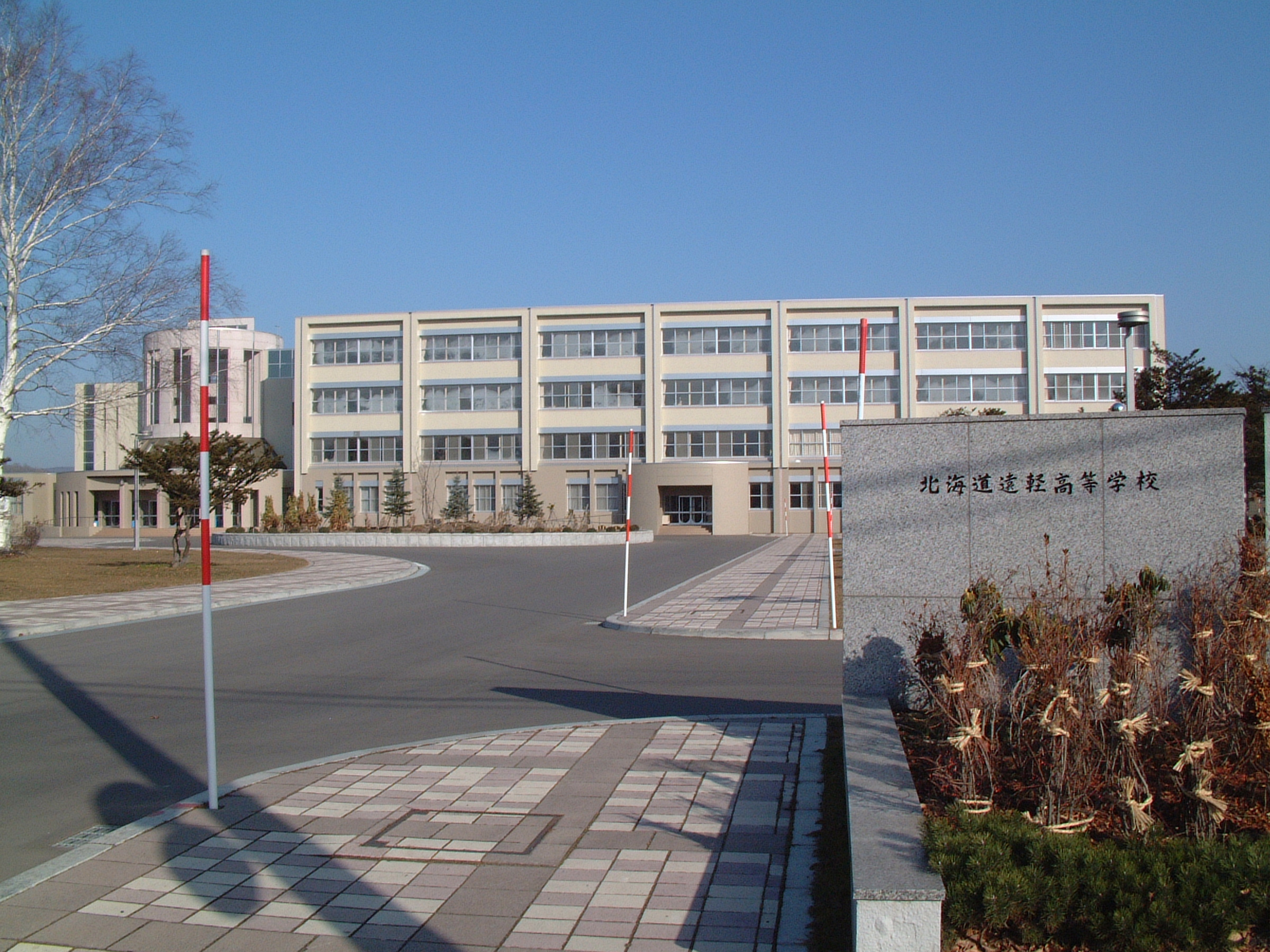
Hokkaido Prefectural Engaru High School

== Sister cities ==
- Bastos, São Paulo, Brazil
- Moirans-en-Montagne, Jura, France

== Notable people ==
- Tomonori Kogawa (born 1950) animator, and animation director of 1980 TV series Space Runaway Ideon
- Masami Tanaka (born 1979) a former swimmer
- Morihei Ueshiba (1883 - 1969) the founder of Aikido, leading Kishū Settlers Group at Shirataki area from Tanabe
- Yoshikazu Yasuhiko (born 1947) animator, manga artist, and character designer of 1979-1980 TV series Mobile Suit Gundam

== See also ==
- Engaru Shimbun - the regional newspaper
