= Maruseppu, Hokkaido =

Former municipality in Monbetsu district, Hokkaido, Japan

Maruseppu 丸瀬布町 まるせっぷちょう
- Town
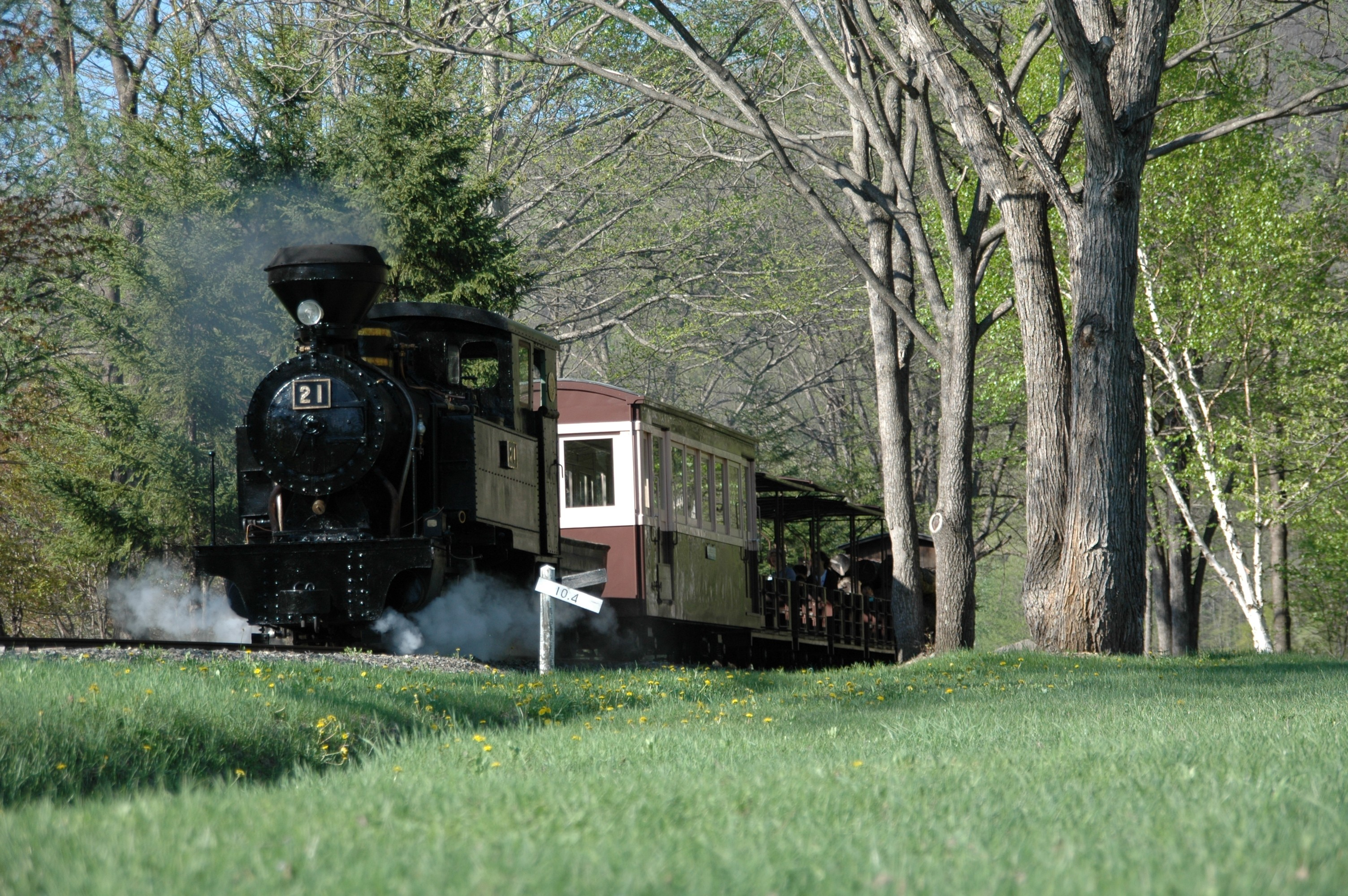
- Maruseppu Recreation Forest Park

- Flag Seal
- Interactive map of Maruseppu
- Country: Japan
- Region: Hokkaido
- Prefecture: Hokkaido
- Subprefecture: Abashiri
- District: Monbetsu
- Merged: October 1, 2005

Area
  - Total: 510.13 km^{2} (196.96 sq mi)

Population (2005)
  - Total: 2,019
  - Density: 3.958/km^{2} (10.25/sq mi)

Maruseppu (丸瀬布町, Maruseppu-chō) was a town located in Monbetsu District, Abashiri Subprefecture (now Okhotsk Subprefecture), Hokkaido, Japan. The town's name comes from a word in the Ainu language which means "a wide area where three rivers gather".

As of April 1, 2005, the town had an estimated population of 2,032, with 1,042 households. The total area was 510.13 km^{2}. Over 95 percent of the town is covered with forests. The town's economy relies upon forestry.

On October 1, 2005, Maruseppu, along with the town of Ikutahara, and the village of Shirataki (all from Monbetsu District), was merged into the expanded town of Engaru.
