= Ikutahara, Hokkaido =

Dissolved municipality in Monbetsu district, Hokkaido, Japan

Ikutahara 生田原町 いくたはらちょう
- Town
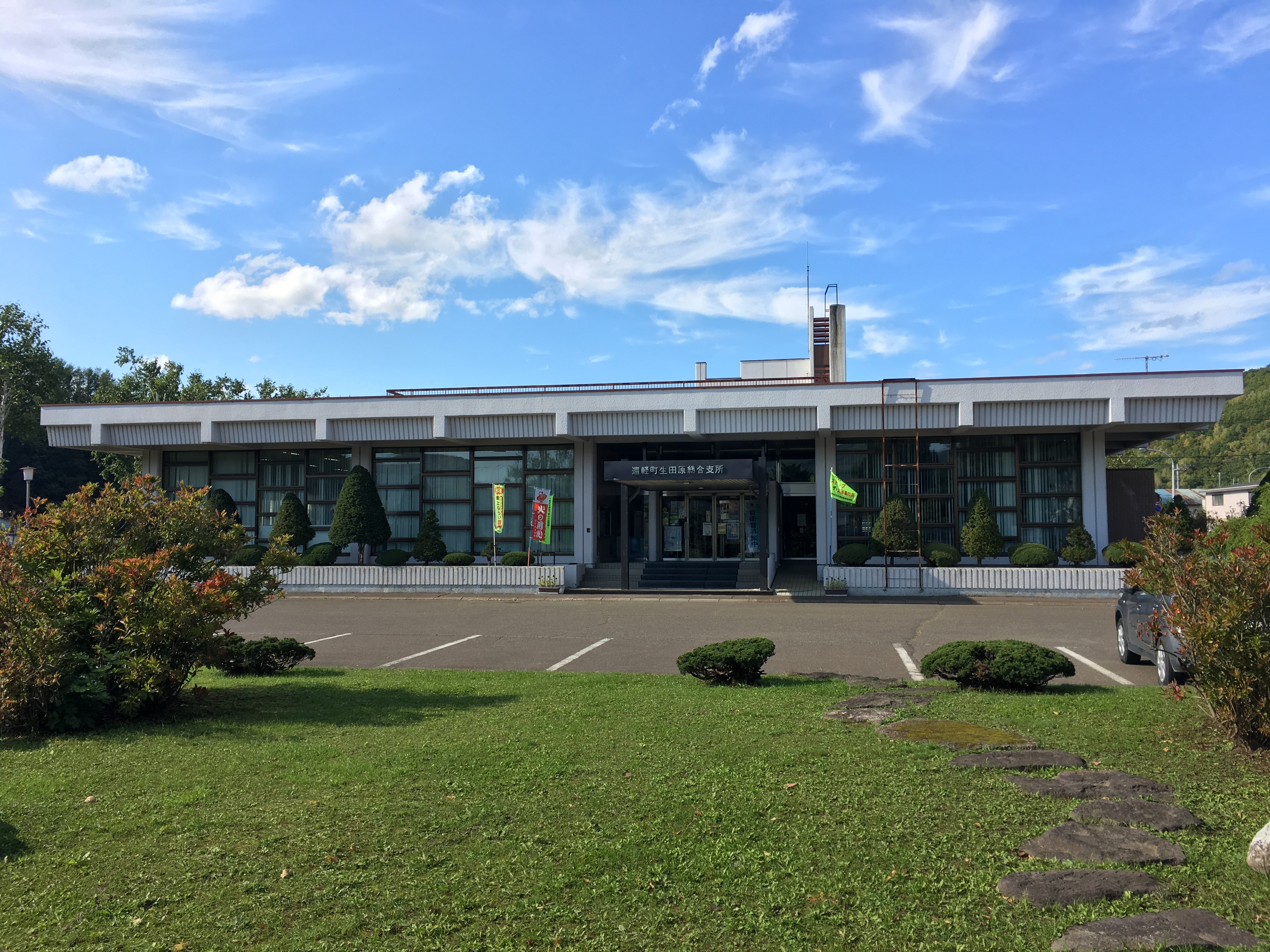
- Ikutahara Town Hall

- Flag Seal
- Interactive map of Ikutahara
- Country: Japan
- Region: Hokkaido
- Prefecture: Hokkaido
- Subprefecture: Abashiri
- District: Monbetsu

Area
  - Total: 269.1 km^{2} (103.9 sq mi)

Population (2005)
  - Total: 2,517
  - Density: 9.353/km^{2} (24.23/sq mi)

Ikutahara (生田原町, Ikutahara-chō) was a town located in Monbetsu District, Abashiri Subprefecture (now Okhotsk Subprefecture), Hokkaido, Japan.

As of 2004, the town had an estimated population of 2,618 and a population density of 9.73 persons per km^{2}. The total area was 269.10 km^{2}.

On October 1, 2005, Ikutahara, along with the town of Maruseppu, and the village of Shirataki (all from Monbetsu District), was merged into the expanded town of Engaru.

== Climate ==
Climate data for Ikutahara (1991−2020 normals, extremes 1977−present)
Month	Jan	Feb	Mar	Apr	May	Jun	Jul	Aug	Sep	Oct	Nov	Dec	Year
Record high °C (°F)	8.1 (46.6)	11.5 (52.7)	18.6 (65.5)	29.8 (85.6)	37.0 (98.6)	36.4 (97.5)	35.9 (96.6)	35.9 (96.6)	32.6 (90.7)	26.7 (80.1)	22.7 (72.9)	14.8 (58.6)	37.0 (98.6)
Mean daily maximum °C (°F)	−3.0 (26.6)	−2.0 (28.4)	2.5 (36.5)	10.1 (50.2)	17.3 (63.1)	21.0 (69.8)	24.3 (75.7)	24.9 (76.8)	21.1 (70.0)	14.8 (58.6)	6.7 (44.1)	−0.6 (30.9)	11.4 (52.6)
Daily mean °C (°F)	−9.0 (15.8)	−8.6 (16.5)	−3.2 (26.2)	3.9 (39.0)	10.3 (50.5)	14.5 (58.1)	18.4 (65.1)	19.2 (66.6)	14.9 (58.8)	8.1 (46.6)	1.2 (34.2)	−6.0 (21.2)	5.3 (41.6)
Mean daily minimum °C (°F)	−16.3 (2.7)	−16.6 (2.1)	−10.1 (13.8)	−2.4 (27.7)	3.4 (38.1)	8.7 (47.7)	13.4 (56.1)	14.4 (57.9)	9.3 (48.7)	2.0 (35.6)	−4.0 (24.8)	−12.3 (9.9)	−0.9 (30.4)
Record low °C (°F)	−31.0 (−23.8)	−33.8 (−28.8)	−29.0 (−20.2)	−17.0 (1.4)	−7.7 (18.1)	−2.3 (27.9)	2.1 (35.8)	4.1 (39.4)	−1.1 (30.0)	−6.5 (20.3)	−17.5 (0.5)	−27.9 (−18.2)	−33.8 (−28.8)
Average precipitation mm (inches)	40.3 (1.59)	27.7 (1.09)	30.7 (1.21)	39.6 (1.56)	54.6 (2.15)	67.7 (2.67)	113.3 (4.46)	136.3 (5.37)	122.0 (4.80)	79.6 (3.13)	47.6 (1.87)	49.4 (1.94)	808.9 (31.85)
Average precipitation days (≥ 1 mm)	10.2	9.1	9.7	9.4	10.1	10.7	11.8	12.1	11.2	10.1	9.4	10.6	124.4
Mean monthly sunshine hours	95.6	111.7	148.1	170.4	181.3	159.9	153.5	144.8	147.4	145.4	114.8	95.9	1,668.6
Source: JMA
