= Shirataki, Hokkaido =

Former village on Hokkaido, Japan

Shirataki 白滝村 しらたきむら
- Village
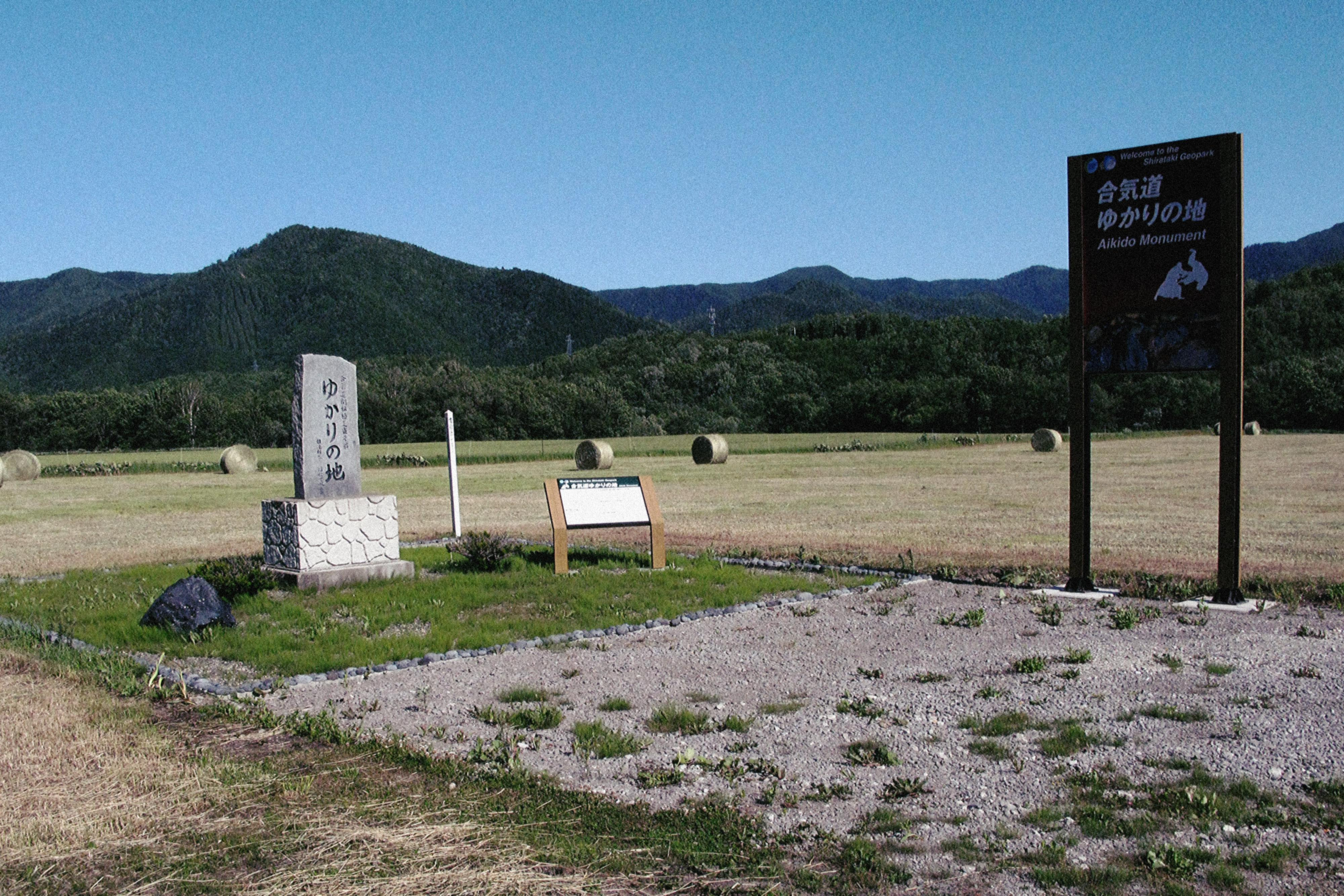
- Aikido monument

- Flag Seal
- Interactive map of Shirataki
- Country: Japan
- Region: Hokkaido
- Prefecture: Hokkaido
- Subprefecture: Abashiri
- District: Monbetsu

Area
  - Total: 342.96 km^{2} (132.42 sq mi)

Population (2004)
  - Total: 1,305
  - Density: 3.805/km^{2} (9.855/sq mi)

Shirataki (白滝村, Shirataki-mura) was a village located in Monbetsu District, Abashiri Subprefecture (now Okhotsk Subprefecture), Hokkaido, Japan.

== Population ==
As of 2004, the village had an estimated population of 1,305 and a population density of 3.81 persons per km^{2}. The total area was 342.96 km^{2}.

== History ==
On October 1, 2005, Shirataki, along with the towns of Ikutahara and Maruseppu (all from Monbetsu District), was merged into the expanded town of Engaru.

An Upper Palaeolithic site at Shirataki is the source of some Yubetsu technique stone blades dating from c 13,000 years ago.

Shirataki is considered the birthplace of Aikido. Leading a group of settlers, Morihei Ueshiba refined his martial art and developed the techniques he would later call Aikido.

== Tourism ==
Shirataki Ruins Group - The ruins concentrated from the summit of Mount Akaishi (elevation 117 meters), located 6.5 kilometers north-northwest of Honmura, to the Yubetsu River basin can be divided into a quarry base at an elevation of over 800 meters, a relay station around an elevation of 600 meters, and a settlement built at an elevation of around 400 meters. It can be assumed that there was a division of labor system divided into stone extraction, transportation, and production. These were then transported to key relay points throughout the Hokkaido region[1].

== Famous People ==
Morihei Ueshiba - Founder of Aikido. In 1912, he settled in the Shirataki wilderness of Kamiyubetsu Village, Monbetsu District, as the head of a group of 54 households from the Kishu region. A monument has been erected on the site of his former home in the Kamishirataki area. He was from Wakayama Prefecture.

== Climate ==
Climate data for Shirataki (1993−2020 normals, extremes 1993−present)
Month	Jan	Feb	Mar	Apr	May	Jun	Jul	Aug	Sep	Oct	Nov	Dec	Year
Record high °C (°F)	7.3 (45.1)	14.0 (57.2)	17.4 (63.3)	25.4 (77.7)	33.4 (92.1)	33.4 (92.1)	34.0 (93.2)	33.6 (92.5)	31.0 (87.8)	26.1 (79.0)	20.1 (68.2)	12.3 (54.1)	34.0 (93.2)
Mean daily maximum °C (°F)	−5.0 (23.0)	−3.8 (25.2)	0.8 (33.4)	8.3 (46.9)	16.1 (61.0)	20.1 (68.2)	23.6 (74.5)	23.7 (74.7)	19.4 (66.9)	12.6 (54.7)	4.4 (39.9)	−2.6 (27.3)	9.8 (49.6)
Daily mean °C (°F)	−8.5 (16.7)	−7.8 (18.0)	−3.6 (25.5)	3.1 (37.6)	9.9 (49.8)	14.2 (57.6)	18.1 (64.6)	18.5 (65.3)	14.0 (57.2)	7.3 (45.1)	0.5 (32.9)	−5.8 (21.6)	5.0 (41.0)
Mean daily minimum °C (°F)	−12.6 (9.3)	−12.3 (9.9)	−8.2 (17.2)	−1.9 (28.6)	4.0 (39.2)	8.9 (48.0)	13.9 (57.0)	14.0 (57.2)	9.1 (48.4)	2.6 (36.7)	−3.2 (26.2)	−9.3 (15.3)	0.4 (32.7)
Record low °C (°F)	−24.2 (−11.6)	−23.8 (−10.8)	−21.5 (−6.7)	−11.6 (11.1)	−4.4 (24.1)	−1.7 (28.9)	5.1 (41.2)	4.5 (40.1)	−0.7 (30.7)	−6.6 (20.1)	−14.8 (5.4)	−21.6 (−6.9)	−24.2 (−11.6)
Average precipitation mm (inches)	37.5 (1.48)	29.9 (1.18)	39.4 (1.55)	38.1 (1.50)	56.2 (2.21)	65.8 (2.59)	109.9 (4.33)	143.5 (5.65)	116.8 (4.60)	94.4 (3.72)	76.6 (3.02)	59.0 (2.32)	870.8 (34.28)
Average snowfall cm (inches)	133 (52)	109 (43)	114 (45)	43 (17)	2 (0.8)	0 (0)	0 (0)	0 (0)	0 (0)	6 (2.4)	63 (25)	143 (56)	604 (238)
Average precipitation days (≥ 1.0 mm)	13.0	11.6	12.5	10.9	10.4	10.3	10.7	12.1	12.3	14.0	16.2	15.6	149.6
Average snowy days (≥ 3 cm)	14.7	13.9	14.3	5.6	0.3	0	0	0	0	0.7	7.1	16.5	73.1
Mean monthly sunshine hours	71.4	80.5	120.4	155.6	176.7	160.1	166.4	149.4	142.2	129.0	74.7	56.9	1,484.3
Source: JMA
