= Oiwake =

Oiwake may refer to:

- Oiwake, Hokkaido
- Oiwake station (disambiguation)
