= 追分 =

追分, meaning "fork in a road", may refer to:

- Oiwake (disambiguation), Japanese place names
- Zhuifen railway station, railway station of the Taiwan Railways Administration

== See also ==
- The dictionary definition of 追 at Wiktionary
- The dictionary definition of 分 at Wiktionary
