= Engaru Shimbun =

- Type: Daily (Tuesday to Saturday) newspaper
- Format: JIS A4
- Owner: Eiji Kobayashi (President)
- Founded: 20 July 1976
- Ceased publication: 30 June 2015
- Language: Japanese
- Headquarters: Engaru, Hokkaido; Japan
- Circulation: 1,000

The Engaru Shimbun was a regional daily newspaper, published by Engaru Shimbun Inc. based on Engaru, Hokkaido, Japan. It served the town of Engaru and surrounding communities. It was discontinued on 30 June 2015.

== History ==
The Engaru Shimbun (lit. "Engaru News") was founded in 1946 as Hokutō Mimpō and Takuhoku Shimbun. On 20 July 1976, Hokutō Mimpō and Nikkan Takuhoku merged to form the Engaru Shimbun.

Hokutō Mimpō (lit. "Northeast People's News") was founded on 10 January 1946 by Gunichi Terado who managed printing company at Engaru. At first, it was published every ten days. It was changed daily newspaper in 1960.

Nikkan Takuhoku was founded in September 1946 or 1947 as Takuhoku Shimbun (lit. "North Pioneer News") by Sadashichi Kobayashi. Takuhoku Shimbun was published every ten days. In 1950, the paper was changed weekly paper as Takuhoku Shimpō. In 1957, it began daily publishing as Nikkan Takuhoku (lit. "Daily North Pioneer").
