= Tōya, Hokkaido =

Dissolved municipality in Hokkaido, Japan

Tōya 洞爺村 とうやむら
- Town
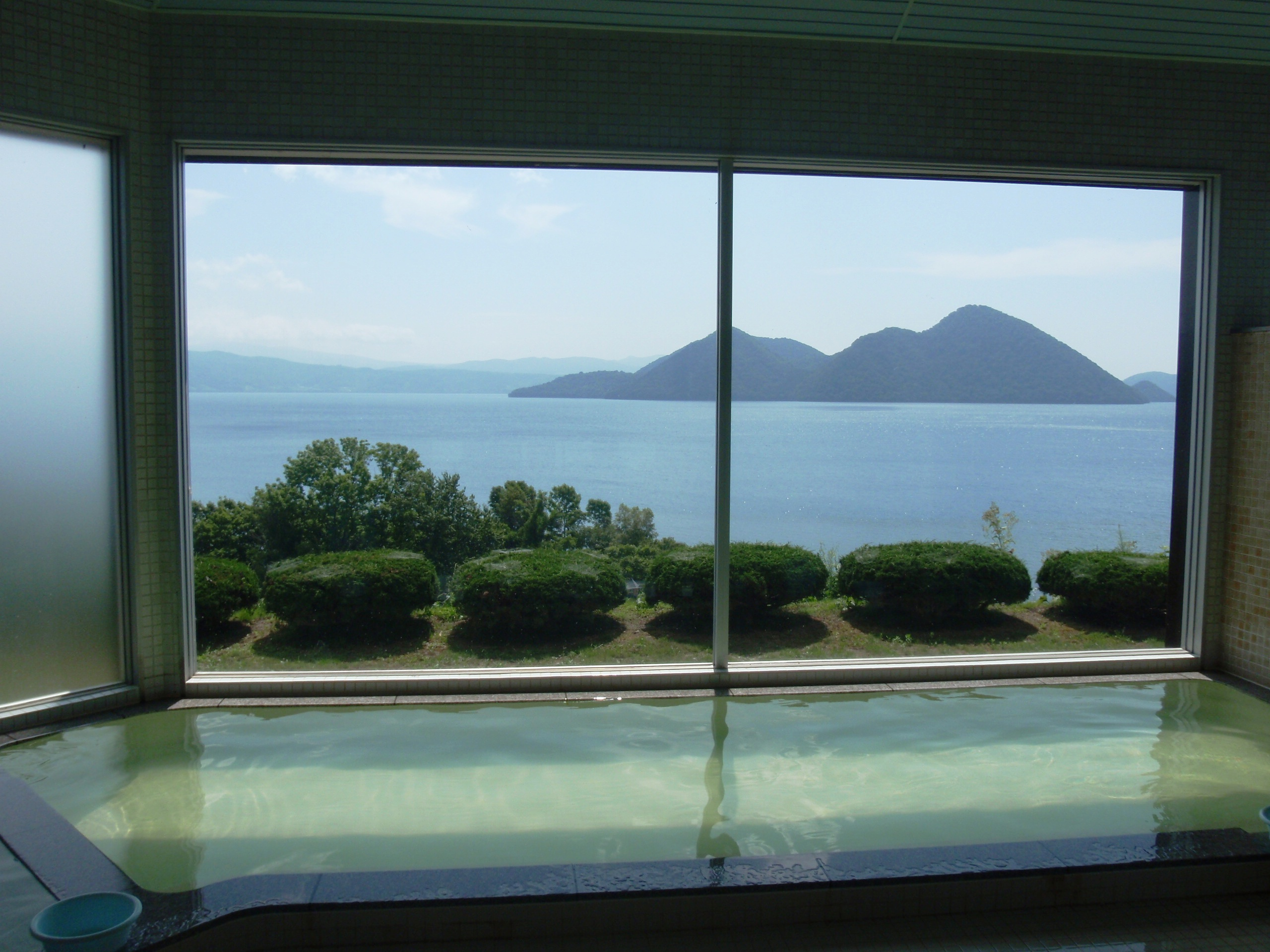
- Tōya Spa

- Flag Seal
- Interactive map of Tōya
- Country: Japan
- Region: Hokkaido
- Prefecture: Hokkaido
- Subprefecture: Iburi
- District: Abuta

Area
  - Total: 113.69 km^{2} (43.90 sq mi)

Population (2004)
  - Total: 2,221
  - Density: 19.54/km^{2} (50.60/sq mi)

Tōya (洞爺村, Tōya-mura) was a village located in Abuta (Iburi) District, Iburi Subprefecture, Hokkaido, Japan.

As of 2004, the village had an estimated population of 2,221 and a density of 19.54 persons per km^{2}. The total area was 113.69 km^{2}.

On March 27, 2006, Tōya was merged with the town of Abuta (also from Abuta (Iburi) District) to create the new town of Tōyako.

The locality has yearly Gap Year volunteers from the UK sent by the organization Project Trust, that worked with the local Board of Education to help teach English to the local residents, both old and young. They teach evening classes for the adults and participate in lessons at all the schools locally, ranging from nursery to high school.
