= Nishiokoppe =

Nishiokoppe 西興部村
- Village
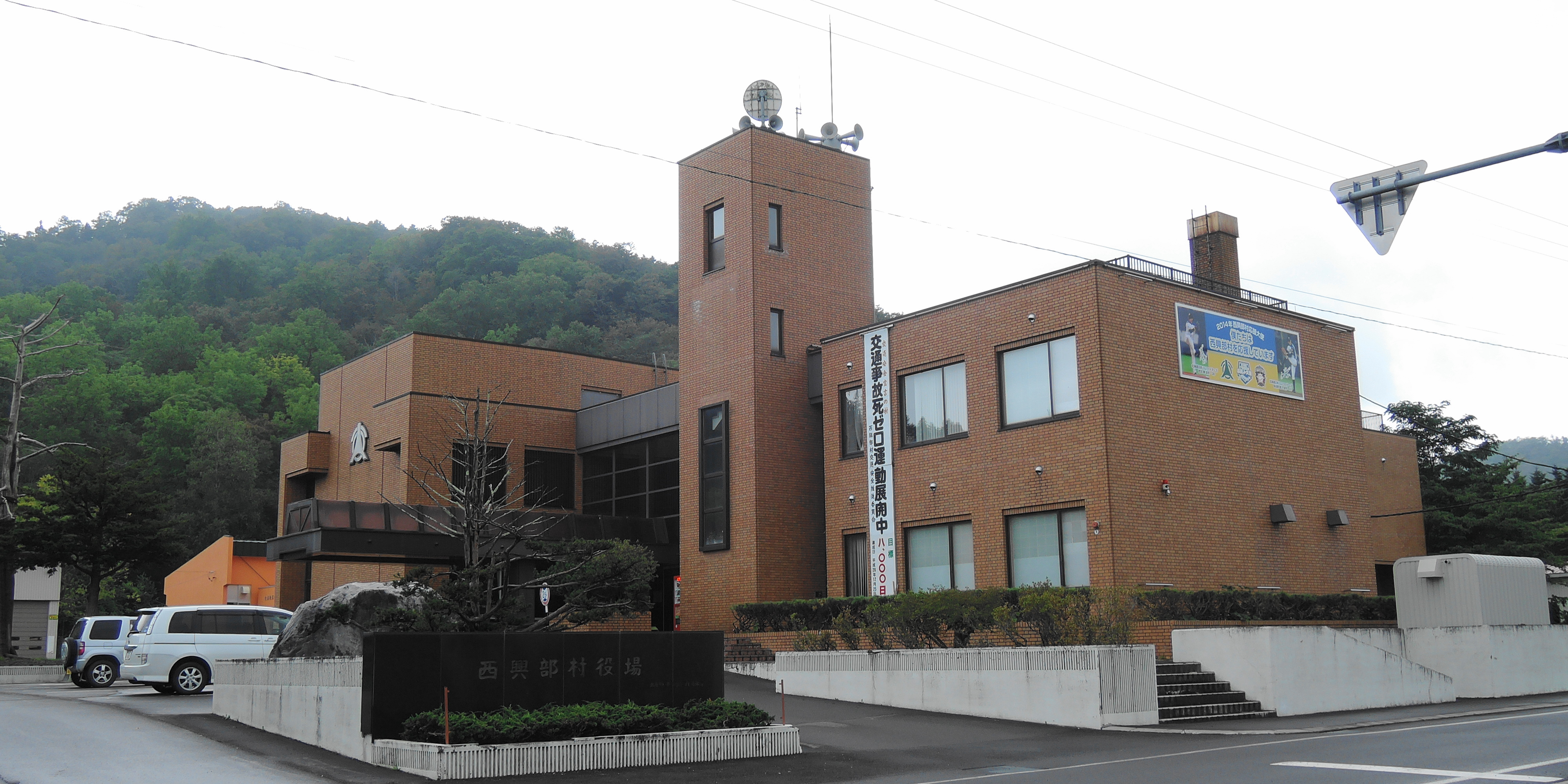
- Nishiokoppe village hall

- Flag Seal

- Location of Nishiokoppe in Hokkaido (Okhotsk Subprefecture)

- Location in Japan
- Coordinates: 44°20′N 142°57′E
- Country: Japan
- Region: Hokkaido
- Prefecture: Hokkaido (Okhotsk Subprefecture)
- District: Monbetsu

Area
  - Total: 308.12 km^{2} (118.97 sq mi)

Population (September 30, 2016)
  - Total: 1,120
  - Density: 3.63/km^{2} (9.41/sq mi)
- Time zone: UTC+09:00 (JST)
- Climate: Dfb
- Website: www.vill.nishiokoppe.hokkaido.jp

Nishiokoppe (西興部村, Nishi-Okoppe-mura) is a village located in Okhotsk Subprefecture, Hokkaido, Japan.

As of September 2016, the village has an estimated population of 1,120. The total area is 308.12 km^{2}.

== Geography ==
=== Climate ===
Climate data for Nishiokoppe (1991−2020 normals, extremes 1977−present)
Month	Jan	Feb	Mar	Apr	May	Jun	Jul	Aug	Sep	Oct	Nov	Dec	Year
Record high °C (°F)	7.5 (45.5)	13.9 (57.0)	17.2 (63.0)	27.9 (82.2)	33.4 (92.1)	33.7 (92.7)	35.7 (96.3)	36.4 (97.5)	32.1 (89.8)	25.7 (78.3)	21.2 (70.2)	14.7 (58.5)	36.4 (97.5)
Mean daily maximum °C (°F)	−3.1 (26.4)	−2.2 (28.0)	2.3 (36.1)	9.5 (49.1)	16.5 (61.7)	20.1 (68.2)	23.4 (74.1)	24.4 (75.9)	20.9 (69.6)	14.3 (57.7)	6.0 (42.8)	−0.9 (30.4)	10.9 (51.7)
Daily mean °C (°F)	−7.8 (18.0)	−7.3 (18.9)	−2.6 (27.3)	4.0 (39.2)	10.1 (50.2)	14.0 (57.2)	18.0 (64.4)	19.0 (66.2)	14.8 (58.6)	8.3 (46.9)	1.9 (35.4)	−4.6 (23.7)	5.7 (42.2)
Mean daily minimum °C (°F)	−14.0 (6.8)	−14.2 (6.4)	−8.5 (16.7)	−1.7 (28.9)	3.6 (38.5)	8.5 (47.3)	13.3 (55.9)	14.5 (58.1)	9.3 (48.7)	2.7 (36.9)	−2.2 (28.0)	−9.5 (14.9)	0.1 (32.3)
Record low °C (°F)	−30.8 (−23.4)	−33.2 (−27.8)	−27.7 (−17.9)	−15.1 (4.8)	−5.8 (21.6)	−2.2 (28.0)	2.5 (36.5)	4.0 (39.2)	−1.0 (30.2)	−7.0 (19.4)	−17.5 (0.5)	−25.1 (−13.2)	−33.2 (−27.8)
Average precipitation mm (inches)	57.4 (2.26)	41.5 (1.63)	47.7 (1.88)	46.0 (1.81)	61.7 (2.43)	70.3 (2.77)	116.9 (4.60)	137.7 (5.42)	150.9 (5.94)	114.8 (4.52)	99.0 (3.90)	74.5 (2.93)	1,015.1 (39.96)
Average snowfall cm (inches)	153 (60)	122 (48)	110 (43)	32 (13)	2 (0.8)	0 (0)	0 (0)	0 (0)	0 (0)	3 (1.2)	55 (22)	150 (59)	623 (245)
Average precipitation days (≥ 1.0 mm)	14.6	12.9	13.3	11.7	10.7	9.7	10.5	11.4	13.2	14.4	17.1	17.2	156.7
Average snowy days (≥ 3 cm)	16.5	14.1	13.3	4.4	0.2	0	0	0	0	0.3	6.3	17.0	72.1
Mean monthly sunshine hours	72.5	91.8	130.4	163.7	176.4	152.7	143.0	139.8	152.6	133.7	73.4	59.4	1,489.4
Source: JMA

== Mascot ==
Setoshi-kun, the town's mascot

Nishiokoppe's mascot is Setoshi-kun (セトウシくん). He is an orange and white bull who is a musician. He works at the local dairy farm. He carries his electric guitar to play (though he sometimes uses it as a weapon).

== Notable people from Nishiokoppe ==
- Hagurohana Toji, former sumo wrestler
