= Ōmu =

Ōmu 雄武町
- Town
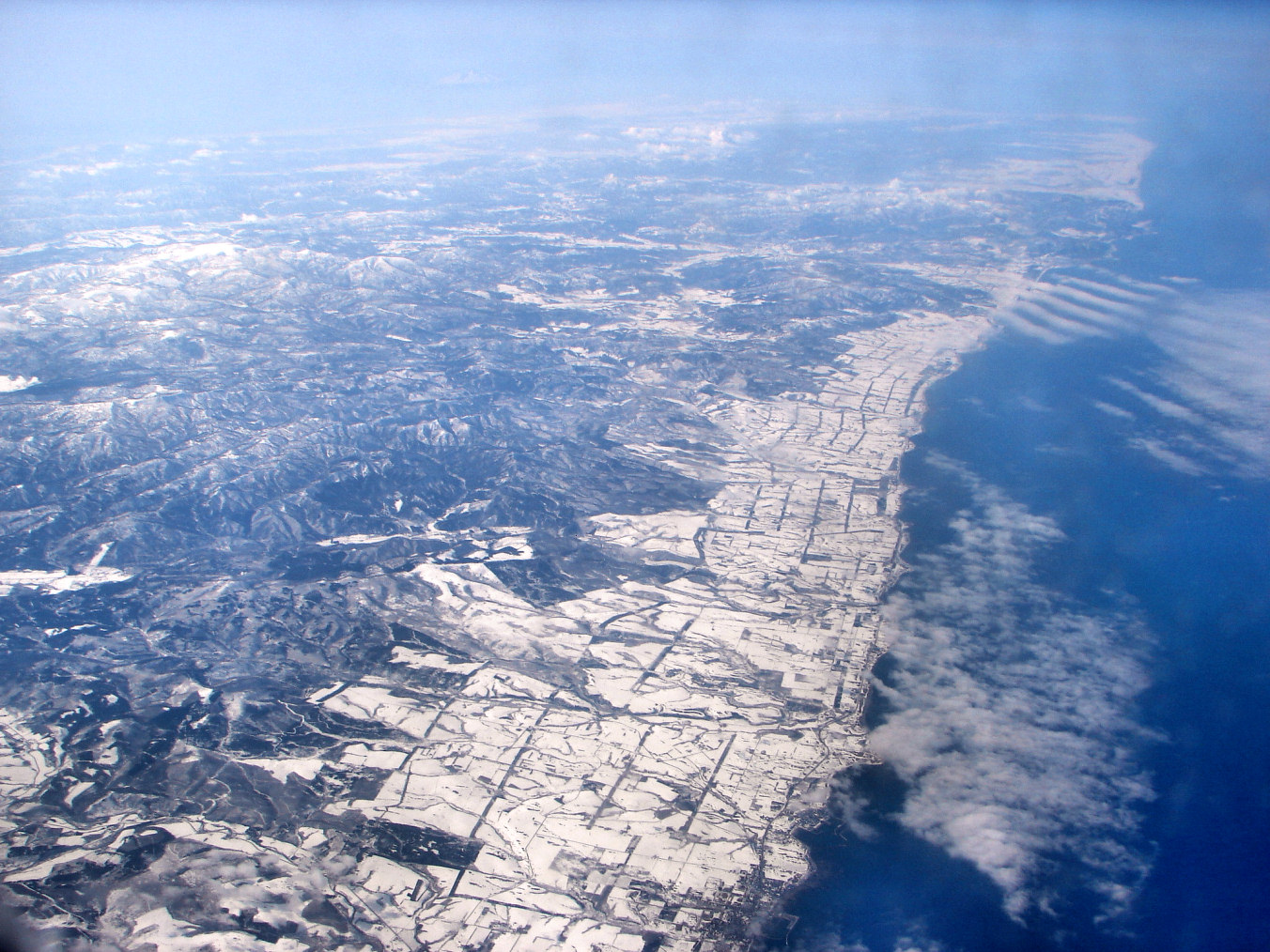
- Aerial view of Ōmu (at bottom edge of picture) with Esashi in the distance

- Flag Seal

- Location of Ōmu in Hokkaido (Okhotsk Subprefecture)

- Location in Japan
- Coordinates: 44°35′N 142°58′E
- Country: Japan
- Region: Hokkaido
- Prefecture: Hokkaido (Okhotsk Subprefecture)
- District: Monbetsu

Area
  - Total: 637.03 km^{2} (245.96 sq mi)

Population (September 30, 2016)
  - Total: 4,596
  - Density: 7.215/km^{2} (18.69/sq mi)
- Time zone: UTC+09:00 (JST)
- Climate: Dfb
- Website: www.town.oumu.hokkaido.jp

Ōmu (雄武町, Ōmu-chō) is a town located in Okhotsk Subprefecture, Hokkaido, Japan.

As of August 2026, the town has an estimated population of 3,910 and a population density of 7.2 persons per km^{2}. The total area is 637.03 km^{2}.

== Climate ==
Omu has a humid continental climate (Köppen climate classification Dfb) with warm summers and cold winters. Precipitation is significant throughout the year, but is heaviest from August to October.

The highest temperature ever recorded in Ōmu was 35.3 °C (95.5 °F) on 17 August 2023. The coldest temperature ever recorded was −27.5 °C (−17.5 °F) on 18 February 1978.

Climate data for Ōmu (1991−2020 normals, extremes 1942−present)
Month	Jan	Feb	Mar	Apr	May	Jun	Jul	Aug	Sep	Oct	Nov	Dec	Year
Record high °C (°F)	8.4 (47.1)	15.1 (59.2)	17.3 (63.1)	28.1 (82.6)	33.4 (92.1)	35.1 (95.2)	35.2 (95.4)	35.3 (95.5)	32.3 (90.1)	28.3 (82.9)	21.5 (70.7)	15.3 (59.5)	35.2 (95.4)
Mean maximum °C (°F)	3.8 (38.8)	6.1 (43.0)	11.6 (52.9)	19.8 (67.6)	26.7 (80.1)	28.2 (82.8)	29.6 (85.3)	30.6 (87.1)	27.4 (81.3)	21.7 (71.1)	16.3 (61.3)	7.2 (45.0)	32.1 (89.8)
Mean daily maximum °C (°F)	−2.5 (27.5)	−2.1 (28.2)	2.1 (35.8)	8.6 (47.5)	13.8 (56.8)	16.2 (61.2)	20.1 (68.2)	22.5 (72.5)	20.5 (68.9)	14.6 (58.3)	6.7 (44.1)	0.0 (32.0)	10.0 (50.1)
Daily mean °C (°F)	−5.9 (21.4)	−6.1 (21.0)	−1.7 (28.9)	4.1 (39.4)	9.0 (48.2)	12.3 (54.1)	16.5 (61.7)	18.8 (65.8)	16.0 (60.8)	9.8 (49.6)	2.9 (37.2)	−3.3 (26.1)	6.0 (42.9)
Mean daily minimum °C (°F)	−10.9 (12.4)	−11.7 (10.9)	−6.4 (20.5)	−0.7 (30.7)	4.0 (39.2)	8.4 (47.1)	13.2 (55.8)	15.2 (59.4)	11.2 (52.2)	4.6 (40.3)	−1.4 (29.5)	−7.7 (18.1)	1.5 (34.7)
Mean minimum °C (°F)	−18.4 (−1.1)	−19.3 (−2.7)	−14.8 (5.4)	−6.7 (19.9)	−2.2 (28.0)	2.4 (36.3)	7.7 (45.9)	9.8 (49.6)	4.9 (40.8)	−1.1 (30.0)	−8.5 (16.7)	−15.0 (5.0)	−20.3 (−4.5)
Record low °C (°F)	−26.0 (−14.8)	−27.5 (−17.5)	−24.8 (−12.6)	−13.4 (7.9)	−6.2 (20.8)	−1.9 (28.6)	1.5 (34.7)	4.8 (40.6)	−0.8 (30.6)	−5.6 (21.9)	−15.1 (4.8)	−20.6 (−5.1)	−27.5 (−17.5)
Average precipitation mm (inches)	43.3 (1.70)	36.0 (1.42)	39.0 (1.54)	44.6 (1.76)	61.1 (2.41)	74.8 (2.94)	115.1 (4.53)	133.8 (5.27)	137.2 (5.40)	92.3 (3.63)	77.4 (3.05)	62.1 (2.44)	916.5 (36.08)
Average snowfall cm (inches)	84 (33)	71 (28)	59 (23)	17 (6.7)	2 (0.8)	0 (0)	0 (0)	0 (0)	0 (0)	1 (0.4)	31 (12)	83 (33)	343 (135)
Average rainy days	11.8	10.2	9.5	8.1	8.1	8.8	9.7	10.1	11.2	10.8	12.9	12.6	123.8
Average snowy days	17.3	14.6	13.9	4.0	0.3	0	0	0	0	0.3	7.4	16.1	73.9
Average relative humidity (%)	77	76	73	71	77	86	88	85	80	75	76	77	78
Mean monthly sunshine hours	94.4	115.5	159.4	177.7	176.0	145.7	132.5	138.9	159.9	150.6	97.9	89.9	1,638.3
Source 1: Japan Meteorological Agency
Source 2: Météo Climat

== Mascot ==
Ikurasujiko, the town's mascot

Ōmu's mascot is Ikurasujiko (いくらすじ子). She is a salmon who 3 years old but acts like a mature person. She wears a large bag containing items such as nutrients that enables her to do any talents. Her favorite thing to do is being in an onsen while watching the clouds and the sea. She likes people who smile at each other. Her favourite foods are beef and seafood. She can survive in both extremely cold and extremely hot conditions. She wears a hat that looks like a parrot. She was unveiled in March 2019.
