= Okoppe =

Okoppe 興部町
- Town
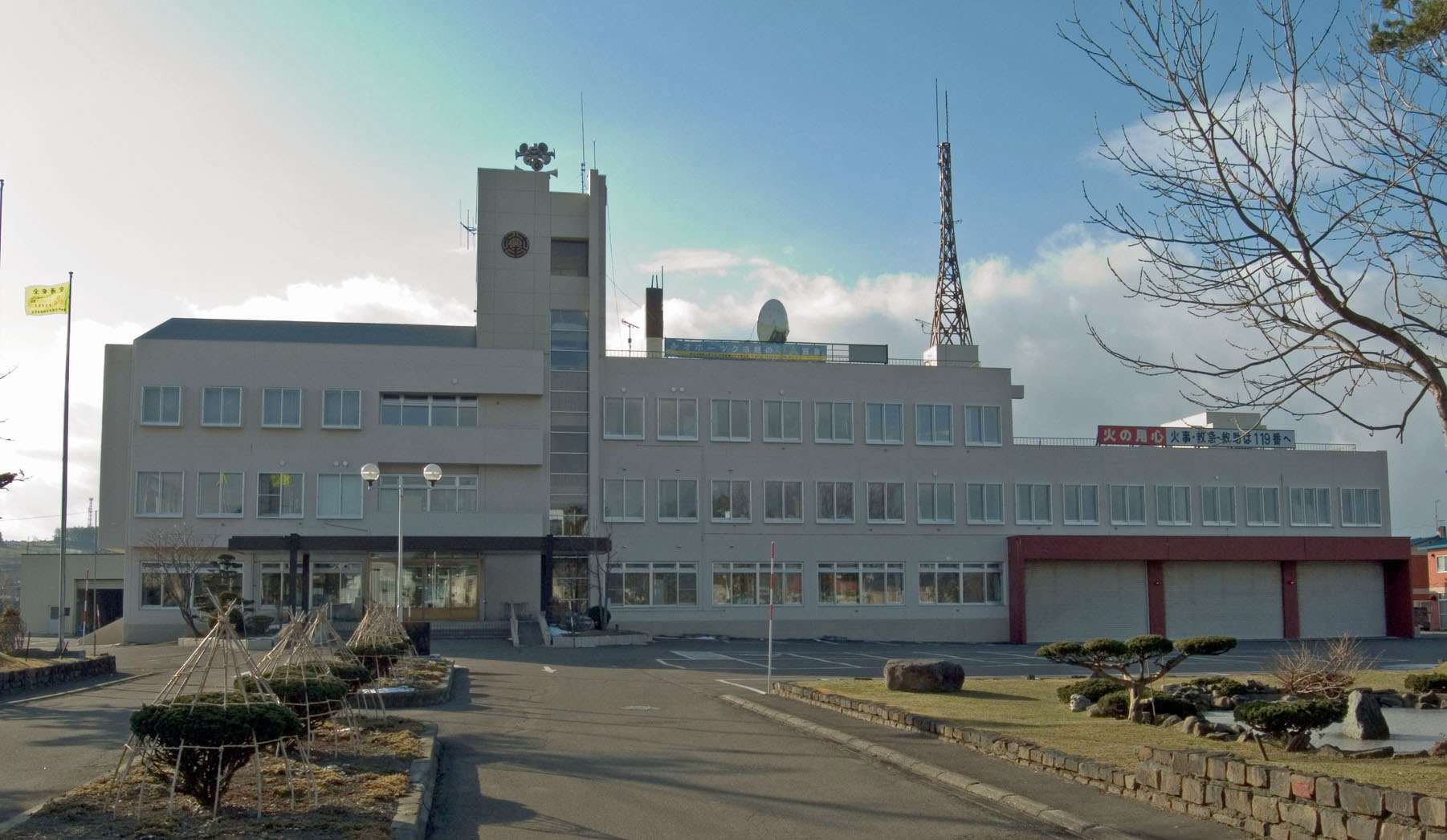
- Okoppe town hall

- Flag Seal

- Location of Okoppe in Hokkaido (Okhotsk Subprefecture)

- Location in Japan
- Coordinates: 44°28′N 143°7′E
- Country: Japan
- Region: Hokkaido
- Prefecture: Hokkaido (Okhotsk Subprefecture)
- District: Monbetsu

Area
  - Total: 362.41 km^{2} (139.93 sq mi)

Population (September 30, 2016)
  - Total: 3,963
  - Density: 10.94/km^{2} (28.32/sq mi)
- Time zone: UTC+09:00 (JST)
- Climate: Dfb
- Website: www.town.okoppe.lg.jp

Okoppe (興部町, Okoppe-chō) is a town located in Okhotsk Subprefecture, Hokkaido, Japan.

As of August 2026, the town has an estimated population of 3,392 and a population density of 11 persons per km^{2}. The total area is 362.41 km^{2}. It is 137 miles from the New Chitose Airport.

Okoppe is twinned with the Town of Stettler, Alberta, Canada since June 26, 1990.

== Climate ==
Climate data for Okoppe (1991−2020 normals, extremes 1977−present)
Month	Jan	Feb	Mar	Apr	May	Jun	Jul	Aug	Sep	Oct	Nov	Dec	Year
Record high °C (°F)	9.3 (48.7)	13.8 (56.8)	16.9 (62.4)	28.6 (83.5)	33.9 (93.0)	33.4 (92.1)	34.1 (93.4)	34.3 (93.7)	32.5 (90.5)	25.5 (77.9)	21.8 (71.2)	15.6 (60.1)	34.3 (93.7)
Mean daily maximum °C (°F)	−2.3 (27.9)	−1.9 (28.6)	2.2 (36.0)	8.9 (48.0)	14.4 (57.9)	17.3 (63.1)	21.0 (69.8)	23.1 (73.6)	20.8 (69.4)	14.8 (58.6)	6.9 (44.4)	0.2 (32.4)	10.5 (50.8)
Daily mean °C (°F)	−6.6 (20.1)	−6.7 (19.9)	−2.0 (28.4)	4.1 (39.4)	9.1 (48.4)	12.6 (54.7)	16.8 (62.2)	18.8 (65.8)	15.6 (60.1)	9.3 (48.7)	2.6 (36.7)	−3.8 (25.2)	5.8 (42.5)
Mean daily minimum °C (°F)	−12.4 (9.7)	−13.1 (8.4)	−7.3 (18.9)	−1.2 (29.8)	3.6 (38.5)	8.0 (46.4)	13.0 (55.4)	14.7 (58.5)	10.3 (50.5)	3.6 (38.5)	−2.1 (28.2)	−8.9 (16.0)	0.7 (33.2)
Record low °C (°F)	−28.1 (−18.6)	−29.8 (−21.6)	−24.5 (−12.1)	−14.4 (6.1)	−5.9 (21.4)	−1.8 (28.8)	0.7 (33.3)	5.2 (41.4)	0.9 (33.6)	−4.5 (23.9)	−13.7 (7.3)	−23.8 (−10.8)	−29.8 (−21.6)
Average precipitation mm (inches)	49.3 (1.94)	36.8 (1.45)	38.4 (1.51)	46.5 (1.83)	61.7 (2.43)	73.8 (2.91)	111.4 (4.39)	133.1 (5.24)	127.3 (5.01)	88.7 (3.49)	72.2 (2.84)	63.0 (2.48)	902.1 (35.52)
Average precipitation days (≥ 1.0 mm)	13.2	10.9	11.4	10.0	10.2	9.8	10.6	11.2	11.3	12.0	13.5	12.9	137
Mean monthly sunshine hours	87.5	105.5	147.4	173.5	179.4	151.2	139.6	142.5	160.2	147.3	91.2	80.8	1,606.1
Source: Japan Meteorological Agency
