= Tōyako, Hokkaido =

Tōyako 洞爺湖町
- Town
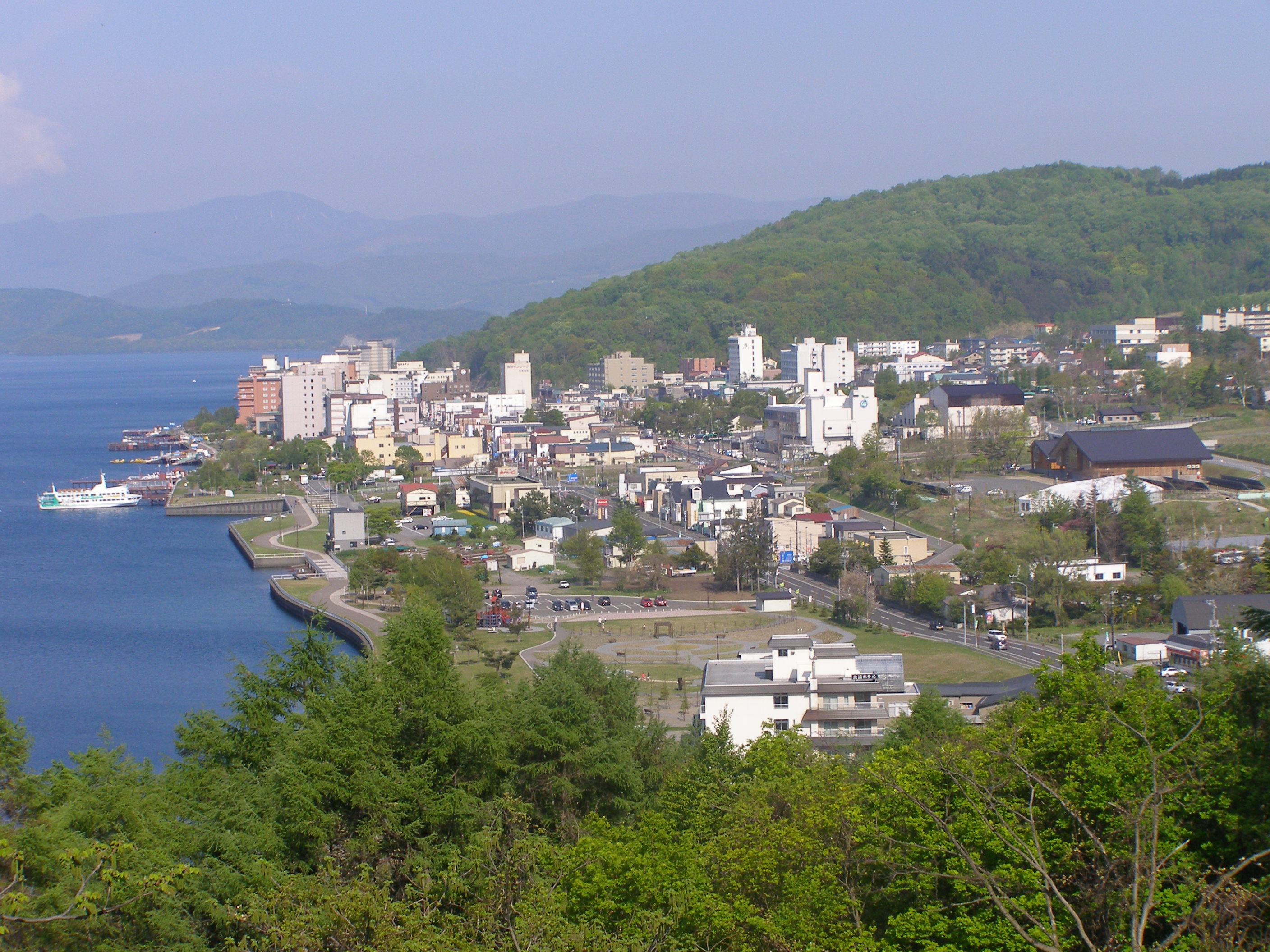
- View of Tōyako

- Flag Seal

- Location of Tōyako in Hokkaido (Iburi Subprefecture)

- Location in Japan
- Coordinates: 42°33′N 140°46′E
- Country: Japan
- Region: Hokkaido
- Prefecture: Hokkaido (Iburi Subprefecture)
- District: Abuta (Iburi)

Government
  - Mayor: Yoshio Nagasaki

Area
  - Total: 180.54 km^{2} (69.71 sq mi)

Population (October 1, 2020)
  - Total: 8,442
  - Density: 46.76/km^{2} (121.1/sq mi)
- Time zone: UTC+09:00 (JST)
- Postal code: 049-5692
- City hall address: 58 Sakae-chō, Tōyako-chō, Abuta-gun, Hokkaido; 049-5692
- Website: http://www.town.toyako.hokkaido.jp/
- Symbols
- Flower: Viola mandshurica, Rhododendron
- Tree: Cherry blossom, Sorbus commixta

Tōyako (洞爺湖町, Tōyako-chō) is a town in Iburi Subprefecture, Hokkaido, Japan. It was formed on March 23, 2006, through the merger of the town of Abuta and the village of Tōya. As of 1 October 2020, the town has an estimated population of 8,442, and a population density of 47 persons per km^{2}. The total area is 180.54 km^{2}.

The name of the town was derived from the nearby Lake Tōya (Tōya-ko).

== G8 summit ==
On April 23, 2007, the town and its surrounding area was announced as the site of the 2008 summer G8 summit. Japan's former Prime Minister Shinzo Abe reportedly chose the area because of its proximity to many famous sightseeing grounds, such as Lake Tōya and Tōyako Onsen.

== Famous sights ==
- Shikotsu-Tōya National Park
  - Lake Tōya
  - Mount Usu
- The Windsor Hotel Toya Resort & Spa, the main conference site of 34th G8 summit
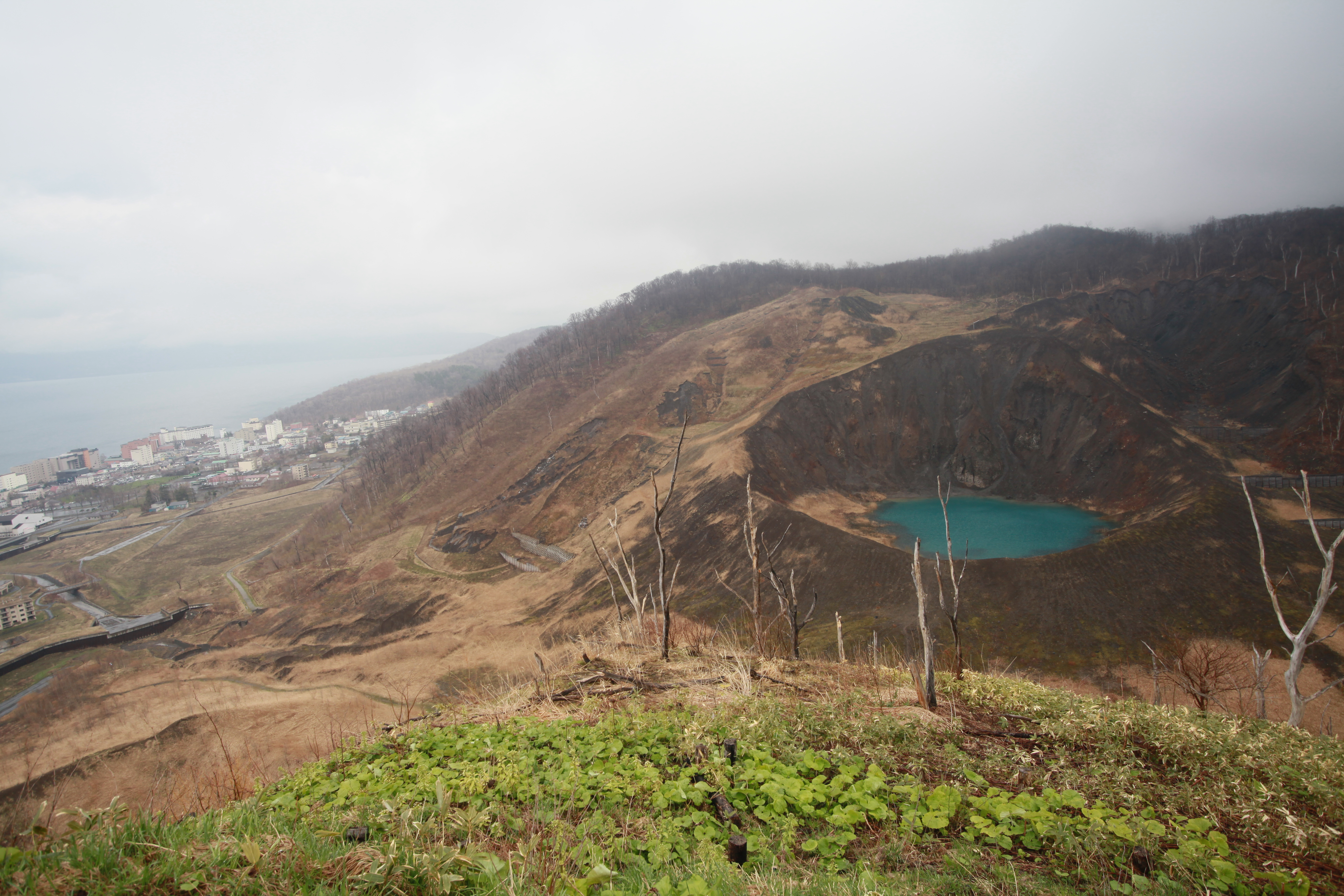
The volcanic crater of Mount Usu, with Tōyako on the left

== Notable people from Tōyako ==
- Mashiro Ayano, singer

== See also ==
- Yo, Blair
