= Yubetsu technique =

Special technique to make microblades

The Yubetsu technique (湧別技法, Yūbetsu gihō) is a special technique to make microblades, proposed by Japanese scholar Yoshizaki in 1961, based on his finds in some Upper Palaeolithic sites in Hokkaido, Japan, which date from c. 13,000 BP.

The name comes from the Yūbetsu River (湧別川, Yubetsugawa), on the right bank of which the Shirataki (白滝遺跡, Shirataki Iseki) Palaeolithic sites were discovered.

To make microblades by this technique, a large biface is made into a core which looks like a tall carinated scraper. Then one lateral edge of the bifacial core is removed, producing at first a triangular spall. After, more edge removals will produce ski spalls of parallel surfaces.

This technique was also used from Mongolia to the Kamchatka Peninsula during the later Pleistocene.
