= Abuta, Hokkaido =

Abuta 虻田町
- Town
- Flag Emblem

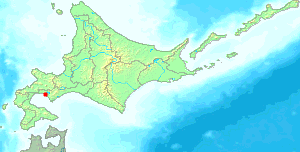
- Location of Abuta in Hokkaido (Iburi Subprefecture)

- Location in Japan
- Coordinates: 42°33′N 140°45′E
- Country: Japan
- Region: Hokkaido
- Prefecture: Hokkaido (Kushiro Subprefecture)
- Now part of Tōyako: March 27, 2006

Area
  - Total: 66.85 km^{2} (25.81 sq mi)

Population (2004)
  - Total: 7,811
  - Density: 116.84/km^{2} (302.6/sq mi)
- Time zone: UTC+09:00 (JST)
- City hall address: 58 Sakaemachi, Abuta-cho, Abuta-gun, Hokkaido; 049-5692
- Website: web.archive.org/web/20060213031645/http://wbsv.town.abuta.hokkaido.jp/index.jsp
- Symbols
- Flower: Viola mandshurica
- Tree: Sorbus commixta

Abuta (虻田町, Abuta-chō) was a town in Japan in the Abuta (Iburi) District of Iburi Subprefecture, Hokkaido.

As of 2004, the town had an estimated population of 7,811 and a density of 116.84 persons per km^{2}. The total area of the town was 66.85 square kilometers (25.81 mi^{2}).

On March 27, 2006, Abuta was merged with the village of Tōya (also from Abuta (Iburi) District) to create the new town of Tōyako.
