= Kamiyūbetsu, Hokkaido =

Coordinates: 44°9′N 143°34′E

Kamiyūbetsu 上湧別町 かみゆうべつちょう
- Town
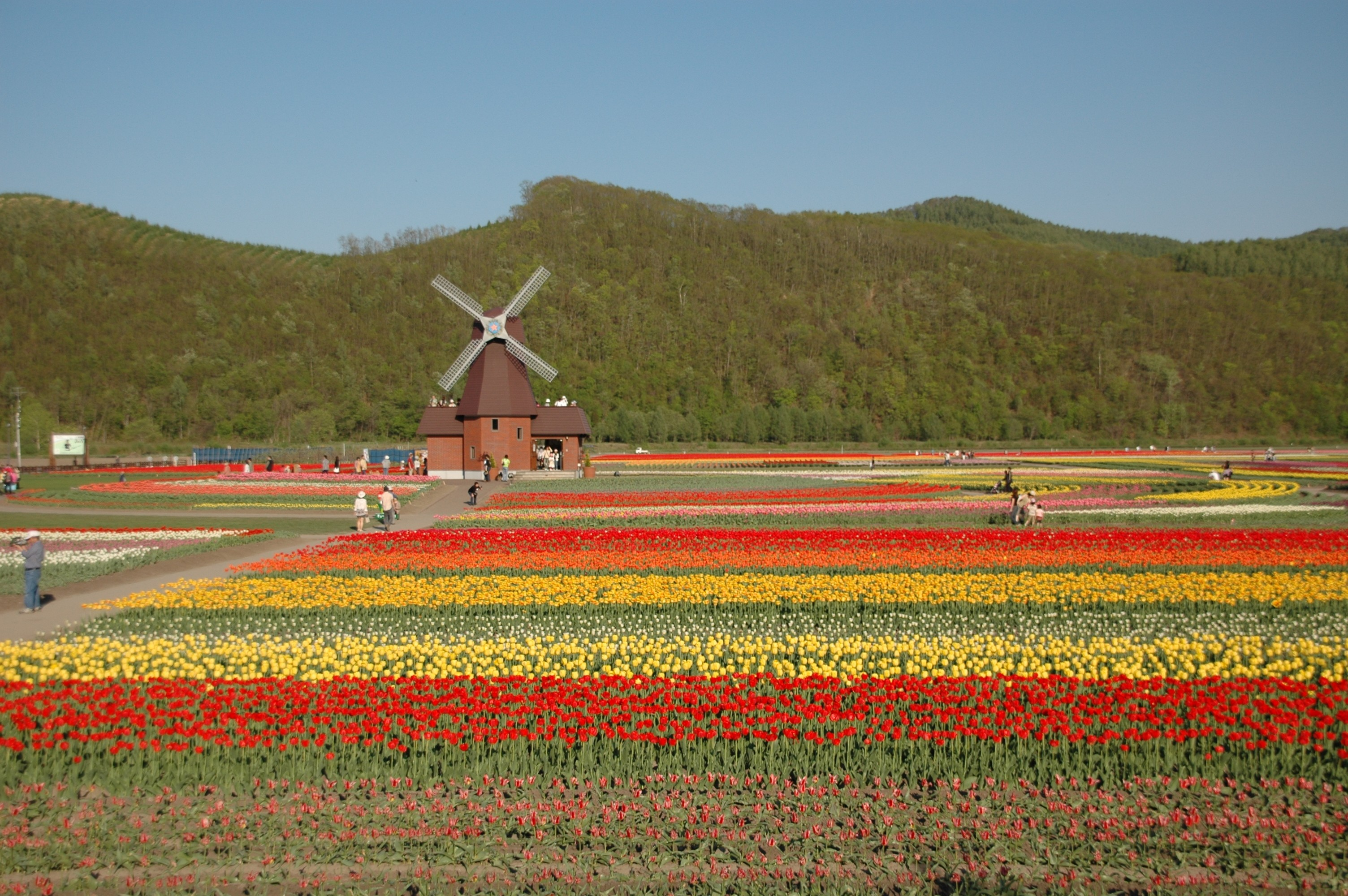
- Kamiyūbetsu Tulip Fair, 2006

- Flag Seal
- Interactive map of Kamiyūbetsu
- Country: Japan
- Region: Hokkaido
- Prefecture: Hokkaido
- Subprefecture: Abashiri
- District: Monbetsu
- Merged: October 5, 2009

Area
  - Total: 161.39 km^{2} (62.31 sq mi)

Population (2005)
  - Total: 5,841
  - Density: 36.19/km^{2} (93.74/sq mi)

Location of Kamiyubetsu in Okhotsk Subprefecture

Kamiyūbetsu (上湧別町, Kamiyūbetsu-chō) was a town located in Monbetsu District, Abashiri Subprefecture (now Okhotsk Subprefecture), Hokkaido, Japan.

As of 2007, the town had an estimated population of 5,695 and a population density of 36.3 persons per km^{2}. The total area is 161.39 km^{2}.

On October 1, 2009, Kamiyūbetsu was merged into the town of Yūbetsu; both are in Monbetsu District, Okhotsk Subprefecture.
