= Hayakita, Hokkaido =

Hayakita 早来町
- Town
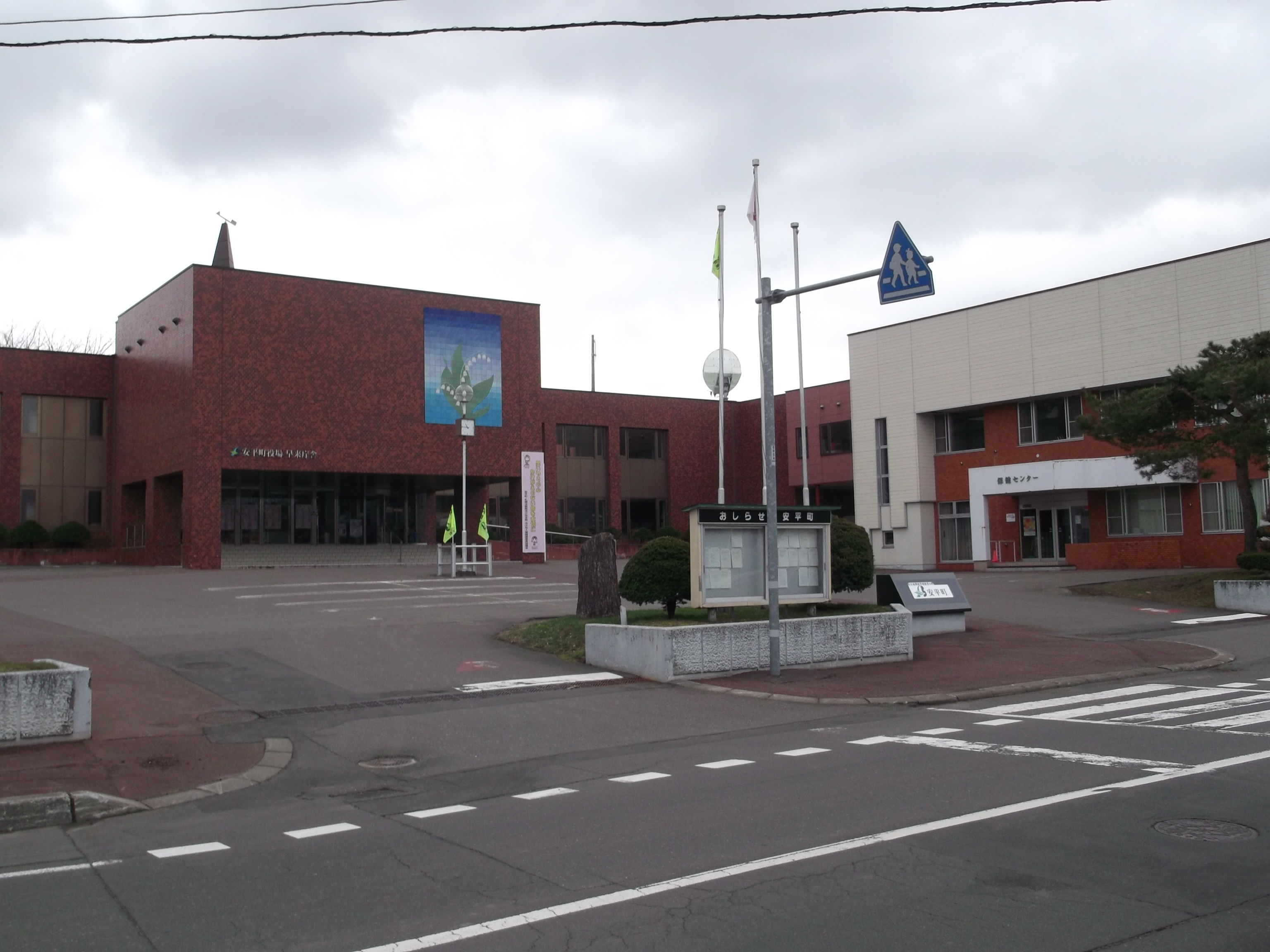
- Hayakita Town Hall

- Flag Emblem

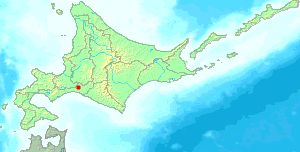
- Location of Hayakita in Hokkaido (Tokachi Subprefecture)

- Location in Japan
- Coordinates: 42°45′46″N 141°49′5″E
- Country: Japan
- Region: Hokkaido
- Prefecture: Hokkaido (Iburi Subprefecture)
- Now part of Abira: March 27, 2006

Area
  - Total: 154.61 km^{2} (59.70 sq mi)

Population (2004)
  - Total: 5,267
  - Density: 34.07/km^{2} (88.2/sq mi)
- Time zone: UTC+09:00 (JST)
- City hall address: 95 Omachi, Hayakita-cho, Yufutsu-gun, Hokkaido; 059-1595
- Website: web.archive.org/web/20060221140258/http://www.town.hayakita.lg.jp/
- Symbols
- Flower: Convallaria keiskei
- Tree: Quercus dentata

Hayakita (早来町, Hayakita-chō) was a town located in Yūfutsu (Iburi) District, Iburi Subprefecture, Hokkaido, Japan.

As of 2004, the town had an estimated population of 5,267 and a density of 34.07 persons per km^{2}. The total area was 154.61 km^{2}.

On March 27, 2006, Hayakita was merged with the town of Oiwake (also from Yufutsu (Iburi) District) to create the new town of Abira.
