= Oiwake, Hokkaido =

Dissolved municipality in Hokkaido, Japan

Oiwake 追分町 おいわけちょう
- Town
- Flag Seal
- Interactive map of Oiwake
- Country: Japan
- Region: Hokkaido
- Prefecture: Hokkaido
- Subprefecture: Iburi
- District: Yūfutsu

Area
  - Total: 82.52 km^{2} (31.86 sq mi)

Population (2005)
  - Total: 3,981
  - Density: 48.24/km^{2} (124.9/sq mi)

Oiwake (追分町, Oiwake-chō) was a town located in Yūfutsu (Iburi) District, Iburi Subprefecture, Hokkaido, Japan.

== Population ==
As of 2005, the town had an estimated population of 3,981 and a density of 48.24 persons per km^{2}. The total area was 82.52 km^{2}.

== Merge ==
On March 27, 2006, Oiwake was merged with the town of Hayakita (also from Yufutsu (Iburi) District) to create the new town of Abira.
