= Oiwake Station =

Oiwake Station (追分駅, Oiwake eki) is the name of multiple train stations in Japan. The word oiwake means "junction" in Japanese.

- Oiwake Station (Akita) - in Akita Prefecture
- Oiwake Station (Hokkaido) - in Hokkaido Prefecture
- Oiwake Station (Mie) - in Mie Prefecture
- Oiwake Station (Shiga) - in Shiga Prefecture
