= Monbetsu District =

District in Hokkaido, Japan

Coordinates: 44°23′24″N 143°11′24″E

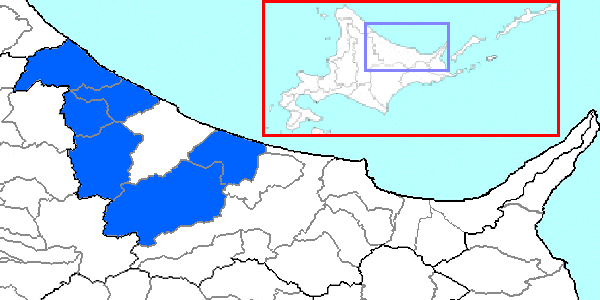
Location of Monbetsu District in Okhotsk Subprefecture

Monbetsu (紋別郡, Monbetsu-gun) is a district located in Okhotsk Subprefecture, Hokkaido, Japan.

In 1869, Hokkaido was divided into 11 provinces and 86 districts. Monbetsu was originally placed in Kitami Province.

As of 2004, the district has an estimated population of 49,851 and a population density of 12.74 persons per km^{2}. The total area is 3,912.51 km^{2}.

== Towns and villages ==
- Engaru
- Nishiokoppe
- Okoppe
- Ōmu
- Takinoue
- Yūbetsu

== History ==
- On November 15, 1950, a section of Shimoyūbetsu Village was cut off and incorporated into Saroma Village, Tokoro District.
- On July 1, 1954, Monbetsu Town, Kamishokotsu Village and Shokotsu Village merged to form Monbetsu City, splitting it from the district.
- On October 1, 2005, the towns of Ikutahara and Maruseppu, and the village of Shirataki merged into the expanded town of Engaru.
- On October 1, 2009, the town of Kamiyūbetsu merged into the town of Yūbetsu; both are in Monbetsu District, Abashiri Subprefecture.
