= Yūbetsu, Hokkaido =

Yūbetsu 湧別町
- Town
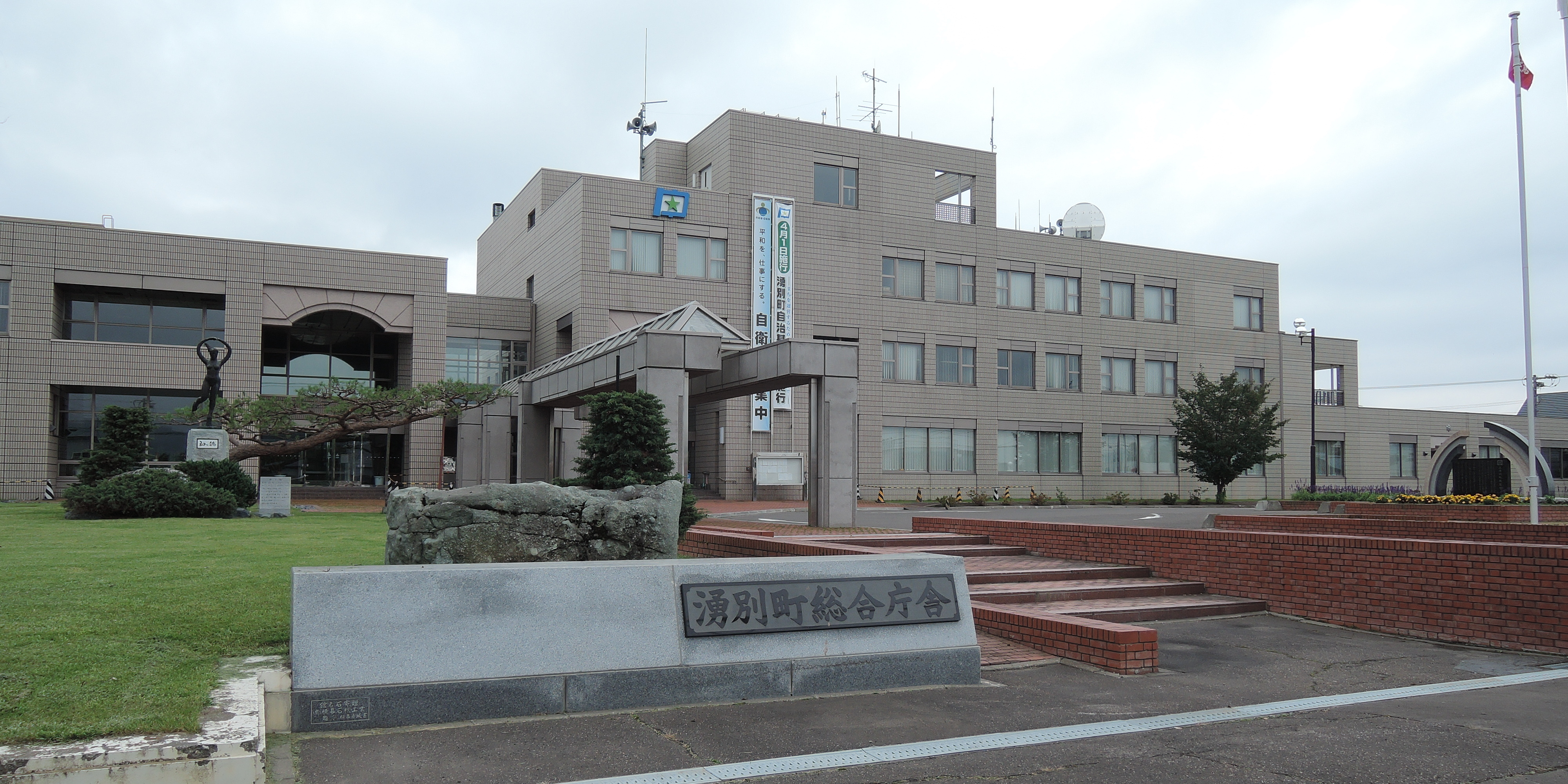
- Yubetsu town hall

- Flag Seal

- Location of Yūbetsu in Hokkaido (Okhotsk Subprefecture)

- Location in Japan
- Coordinates: 44°13′27″N 143°36′58″E
- Country: Japan
- Region: Hokkaido
- Prefecture: Hokkaido (Okhotsk Subprefecture)
- District: Monbetsu

Area
  - Total: 505.74 km^{2} (195.27 sq mi)

Population (February 28, 2021)
  - Total: 8,474
  - Density: 16.76/km^{2} (43.40/sq mi)
- Time zone: UTC+09:00 (JST)
- Climate: Dfb
- Website: www.town.yubetsu.lg.jp

Yūbetsu (湧別町, Yūbetsu-chō) is a town located in Okhotsk Subprefecture, Hokkaido, Japan.

As of May 2025, the town has an estimated population of 7,821. The total area is 505.74 km^{2}.

== History ==
In 1871, tondenhei soldier settlers began a fishing operation in this area, and by 1900 Yūbetsu village was formed as its own entity.

On October 1, 2009, the town of Kamiyūbetsu was merged into Yūbetsu; both are in Monbetsu District, Okhotsk Subprefecture.

== Climate ==
Yūbetsu is situated along Hokkaido's northeastern coast on the Sea of Okhotsk. Due to the Okhotsk Subprefecture's unique geography, it is home to many of Japan's driest places; Yūbetsu is the third driest municipality in Japan with only 750.7mm (29.56 inches) of average annual precipitation.

Climate data for Yūbetsu (1991−2020 normals, extremes 1977−present)
Month	Jan	Feb	Mar	Apr	May	Jun	Jul	Aug	Sep	Oct	Nov	Dec	Year
Record high °C (°F)	9.4 (48.9)	17.1 (62.8)	18.3 (64.9)	31.1 (88.0)	38.5 (101.3)	33.8 (92.8)	34.9 (94.8)	35.5 (95.9)	32.6 (90.7)	28.0 (82.4)	22.3 (72.1)	17.0 (62.6)	38.5 (101.3)
Mean daily maximum °C (°F)	−2.5 (27.5)	−2.3 (27.9)	1.9 (35.4)	9.3 (48.7)	15.0 (59.0)	18.0 (64.4)	21.9 (71.4)	23.7 (74.7)	21.2 (70.2)	15.2 (59.4)	7.3 (45.1)	0.1 (32.2)	10.7 (51.3)
Daily mean °C (°F)	−6.6 (20.1)	−6.8 (19.8)	−2.2 (28.0)	4.3 (39.7)	9.7 (49.5)	13.4 (56.1)	17.5 (63.5)	19.3 (66.7)	16.1 (61.0)	9.8 (49.6)	2.9 (37.2)	−3.8 (25.2)	6.1 (43.0)
Mean daily minimum °C (°F)	−11.7 (10.9)	−12.7 (9.1)	−7.1 (19.2)	−0.4 (31.3)	4.8 (40.6)	9.4 (48.9)	13.9 (57.0)	15.6 (60.1)	11.7 (53.1)	5.0 (41.0)	−1.2 (29.8)	−8.4 (16.9)	1.6 (34.8)
Record low °C (°F)	−26.9 (−16.4)	−27.6 (−17.7)	−24.6 (−12.3)	−14.7 (5.5)	−3.2 (26.2)	0.0 (32.0)	3.8 (38.8)	5.8 (42.4)	2.5 (36.5)	−4.0 (24.8)	−14.9 (5.2)	−22.1 (−7.8)	−27.6 (−17.7)
Average precipitation mm (inches)	32.0 (1.26)	23.1 (0.91)	25.5 (1.00)	38.6 (1.52)	53.7 (2.11)	67.3 (2.65)	102.9 (4.05)	114.1 (4.49)	117.3 (4.62)	79.3 (3.12)	49.3 (1.94)	43.1 (1.70)	750.7 (29.56)
Average precipitation days (≥ 1.0 mm)	10.0	8.4	8.1	9.0	9.9	10.4	11.4	11.6	11.9	10.3	9.8	9.7	120.5
Mean monthly sunshine hours	102.2	120.1	161.0	177.1	179.8	163.0	157.2	157.2	165.3	152.2	110.3	99.0	1,747.4
Source: Japan Meteorological Agency

== Mascots ==
Tupit and Lip-chan, the town's mascots

Yūbetsu's mascots are Tupit (チューピット, Chūpitto) and Lip-chan (リップちゃん, Rippu-chan). They are mischievous tulip siblings who live in the Kamiyubetsu Tulip Park.

- Tupit is a kikomachi tulip. He is 12 years old. He likes onsens and is a very good table tennis player.
- Lip-chan is a jacqueline tulip. She is 10 years old and Tupit's younger sister. She is a good reader and is good at studying the benefits of massage therapy.

== Twin towns ==
=== Canada ===
==== Whitecourt, Alberta ====
In 1991, Hokkaido Prefecture established a partnership with Alberta, Canada to promote international exchange. After the first student exchange that same year, many students and townspeople have visited Whitecourt. Yūbetsu has been twinned with Whitecourt, Alberta, Canada, since 1998.

=== New Zealand ===
==== Selwyn ====
In 1991, a town development committee member visited New Zealand which led to the establishment of a relationship with the town of Selwyn. Student exchanges began with Darfield High school in 1992. Yūbetsu has been twinned with Selwyn, New Zealand since 2000.

=== Hokkaido ===
==== Shinshinotsu Village ====
Between 1942 and 1944, 30 members of the Kamiyubetsu Pioneer Group settled in Shinshinotsu Village. The two municipalities have been close friends with each other and have maintained a mutual exchange program for elementary students since 2005. Yūbetsu has been twinned with Shinshinotsu since 2003.

== Tourism ==
=== Points of Interest ===
==== Kami-Yūbetsu Tulip Park ====
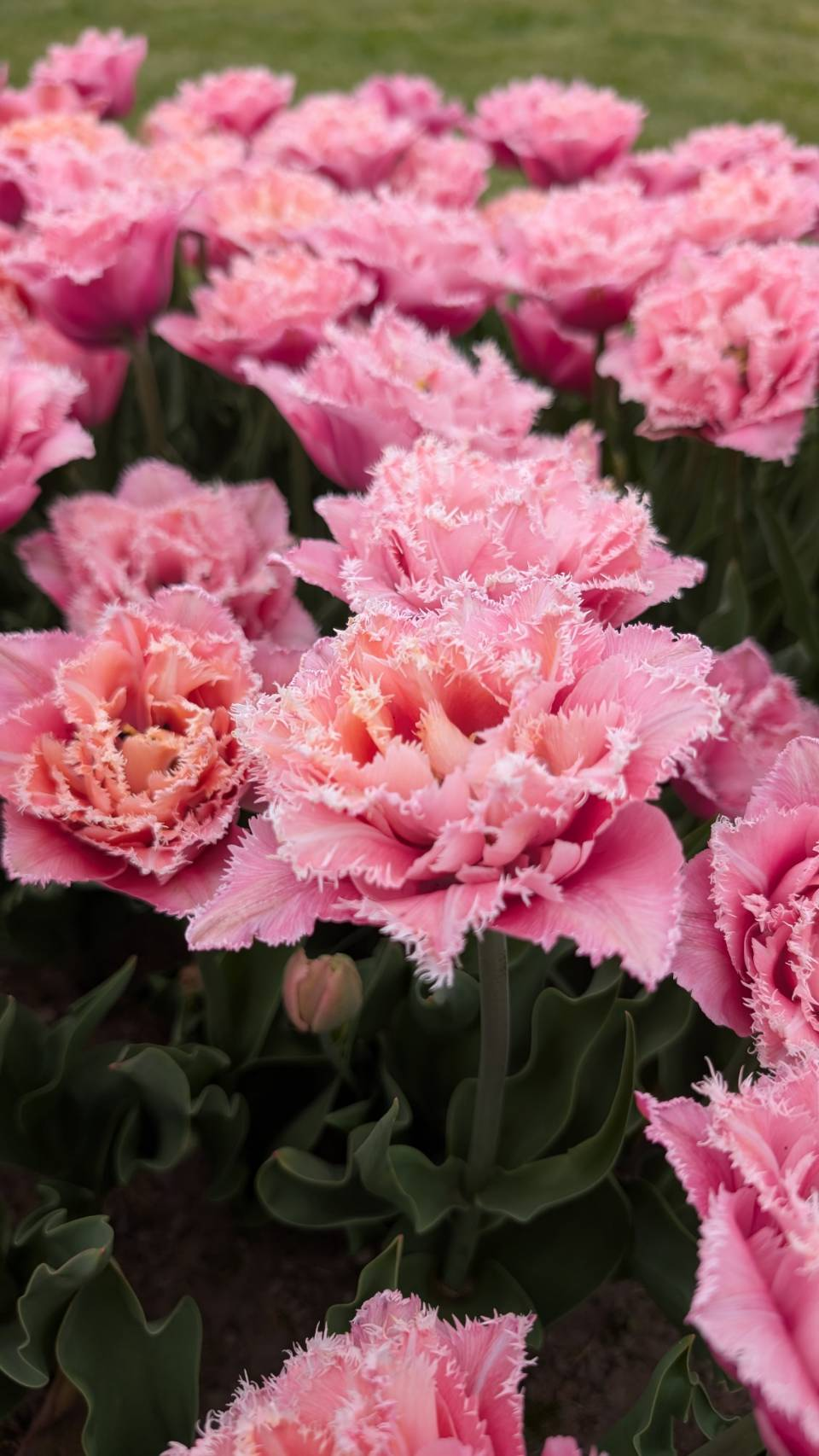
Pink Magic Tulip in bloom in Kami-Yūbetsu Tulip Park (2025)

The Tulip Park is a large 12.5 hectare park consisting of roughly 700,00 individual tulips with roughly 200 varieties planted each year. The park is open to the public from May 1 to May 31. During the opening period, there are various events within the park such as musical performances, talk shows, tulip picking and street performances.

There are various attractions within the park. An electric tour bus named after one of the town's mascots, "The Tupit" (チューピット号, Chūpittogō), tours guests around the park. There is a giant 300 kg Dutch Clog statue which is a popular photo spot. Within the park is a large Dutch-style windmill which was built in 1987 as a part of the town's tourism development project. Occasionally during the open period, the town mascots, Tupit and Lip-chan, can be seen roaming around taking photos with guests.

Potential visitors are able to explore a previous tulip park via a 360º walkthrough experience on the town website.

==== Town Museum JRY ====
Located next to Kami-Yūbetsu Tulip Park, the Town Museum JRY (ふるさと館JRY, furusatokan jeri), showcasing artifacts and detailing the history of the town from the time of its colonization.

The museum features two floors, with the first floor containing a relocated and restored Japanese colonial soldier settler's house. These soldiers, called Tondenhei (屯田兵, tondenhei, literally "field-encampent soldiers"), first colonized the Yūbetsu area during the Meiji era. This restored Tondenhei house (屯田兵屋, tondenheiya) is recognized as a Hokkaido Heritage Site. The second floor contains artifacts and documents from the Tondenhei's recruitment until its disbandment.

==== Culture Centre TOM ====
The Culture Centre TOM (文化センターTOM, bunka sentā tomu) was built on the site of the former Naka-Yūbetsu train station. The centre contains the Okhotsk Manga Museum, Twin Town artifacts room, and the Naka-Yūbetsu library. The building also contains public working spaces, a 752-seat large theatre hall, an audiovisual theatre, Japanese style rooms, and other meetings spaces.

==== Family Ai-land YOU ====
Located on a small hill overlooking Lake Saroma, Family Ai-land YOU (Family愛Land YOU) is a small amusement park. The park contains several rides such as small monorail, an 800-meter go-kart track, a giant jungle gym, a pirate ship type ride called Great Poseidon, and Japan's most northern ferris wheel. The park is also one of Yūbetsu's two roadside stations.

==== Roadside Station Kami-Yūbetsu Onsen ====
Located within the Naka-Yūbetsu area of Yūbetsu, Roadside Station Kami-Yūbetsu Onsen Tulip Hot Spring (道の駅「かみゆうべつ温泉チューリップの湯」, michi no eki "Kami-Yūbetsu onsen chūrippunoyu), is one of two roadside stations in Yūbetsu. This roadside station contains the Tulip Onsen, a public bath with some tulip themed elements. The building also contains a restaurant serving locally produced food, along with a small shop containing items such as omiyage, locally made delicacies, and sweets made from tulips. On October 27, 2025, Yūbetsu received and installed a Poké Lid near the entrance to the building.

==== Kami-Yūbetsu Centennial Memorial Park ====
Located in the Naka-Yūbetsu area between the Tulip Hot Spring and Culture Centre TOM; the Kami-Yūbetsu Centennial Memorial Park (上湧別百年記念公園, kami-yūbetsu hyakunen kinen kōen) is a small park built on the former site of the Naka-Yūbetsu train station which closed on May 1, 1989. The park contains part of the former train station. The park preserves the northbound and southbound platforms, two train cars, a passenger bridge and level crossing signals of the era. The Centennial Memorial Park Sports Field is open to the public for use. It is also the location of the yearly Tonden Tanabata Festival.
