= Subprefectures of Hokkaido =

List of subprefectures in Hokkaido, Japan

Hokkaido Prefecture had 14 branch offices called 支庁 (shichō) in Japanese, which is often translated in English as subprefectures. Normally, a subprefecture consists of a few to a dozen cities, towns, and/or villages. From April 2010, Hokkaido has nine General Subprefecture Bureaus (総合振興局, sōgō-shinkō-kyoku, literally "Comprehensive Promotion Bureau") and five Subprefecture Bureaus (振興局, shinkō-kyoku, literally "Promotion Bureau")).

For historical reasons, some older people in Hokkaido use the subprefecture name suffixed by -kannai in their address.

== History ==
1897	Nineteen shichō were placed under Hokkaido Agency (an agency of the national government): Sapporo, Hakodate, Kameda, Matsumae, Hiyama, Suttsu, Iwanai, Otaru, Sorachi, Kamikawa, Mashike, Souya, Abashiri, Muroran, Urakawa, Kushiro, Kasai, Nemuro, and Shana.
1899	Sapporo-ku, Hakodate-ku, and Otaru-ku were established as municipalities independent of shichō. Sapporo-shichō and Otaru-shichō were continued with remaining area, but Hakodate-shichō was dissolved. Previous Kameda-shichō was renamed Hakodate-shichō.
1903	Matsumae-shichō was merged with Hakodate-shichō. Shana-shichō was merged with Nemuro-shichō.
1910	Suttsu-shichō, Iwanai-shichō, and Otaru-shichō were merged to form Shiribeshi-shichō.
1914	Asahikawa-ku was established as a municipality independent of Kamikawa-shichō. Mashike-shichō was renamed as Rumoi-shichō.
1918	Muroran-ku was established as a municipality independent of Muroran-shichō.
1920	Kushiro-ku was established as a municipality independent of Kushiro-shichō.
1922	The six ku were restated as shi (cities). Sapporo-shichō was renamed Ishikari-shichō. Hakodate-shichō was renamed Oshima-shichō. Muroran-shichō was renamed Iburi-shichō.
1932	Urakawa-shichō was renamed Hidaka-shichō. Kasai-shichō was renamed Tokachi-shichō.
1947	Hokkaido Agency was abolished and Hokkaido Prefecture was established. Hokkaido Prefecture took over shichō.

== List of subprefectures ==
Subprefecture		Japanese	Capital	Largest municipality	Pop. (2009)	Area (km^{2})	Pop. Density	Municipalities		
Subprefecture		Japanese	Capital	Largest municipality	Pop. (2009)	Area (km^{2})	Pop. Density	Cities	Towns	Villages
1	Sorachi	空知総合振興局	Iwamizawa	Iwamizawa	338,485	5,791.19	58.45	10	14	0
a	↳ Ishikari	石狩振興局	Sapporo	Sapporo	2,324,878	3,539.86	656.77	6	1	1
2	Shiribeshi	後志総合振興局	Kutchan	Otaru	234,984	4,305.83	54.57	1	13	6
3	Iburi	胆振総合振興局	Muroran	Tomakomai	419,115	3,698.00	113.34	4	7	0
b	↳ Hidaka	日高振興局	Urakawa	Shinhidaka	76,084	4,811.97	15.81	0	7	0
4	Oshima	渡島総合振興局	Hakodate	Hakodate	433,475	3,936.46	110.12	2	9	0
c	↳ Hiyama	檜山振興局	Esashi	Setana	43,210	2,629.94	16.43	0	7	0
5	Kamikawa	上川総合振興局	Asahikawa	Asahikawa	527,575	10,619.20	49.68	4	17	2
d	↳ Rumoi	留萌振興局	Rumoi	Rumoi	53,916	3,445.75	15.65	1	6	1
6	Sōya	宗谷総合振興局	Wakkanai	Wakkanai	71,423	4,625.09	15.44	1	8	1
7	Okhotsk	オホーツク総合振興局	Abashiri	Kitami	309,487	10,690.62	28.95	3	14	1
8	Tokachi	十勝総合振興局	Obihiro	Obihiro	353,291	10,831.24	32.62	1	16	2
9	Kushiro	釧路総合振興局	Kushiro	Kushiro	252,571	5,997.38	42.11	1	6	1
e	↳ Nemuro	根室振興局	Nemuro	Nemuro	84,035	3,406.23	24.67	1	4	*
* Japan claims the southern part of Kuril Islands (Northern Territories), currently administered by Russia, belong to Nemuro Subprefecture divided into six villages. However, the table above excludes these islands' data.

== Reorganisation ==
The prefectural government of Hokkaido planned to reorganise the current fourteen subprefectures into nine sub-prefectural bureaus. Five subprefectures, namely Hidaka, Hiyama, Ishikari, Nemuro, and Rumoi were subject to be cut down. The capital municipalities of these subprefectures opposed the plan, but on June 28, 2008, the prefectural council passed the ordinance of the reorganization. The change should have taken effect in April 2009.

However, it was impossible to make the reform on time. The Public Offices Election Act and the Election Law were not amended on April 1, 2009, but the amendment the Public Offices Election Act was passed in the prefectural assembly on March 31, 2009, and took effect from April 1, 2010.

=== List of subprefecture bureaus ===
- Sorachi General Subprefectural Bureau (空知総合振興局), Iwamizawa, covering Ishikari and Sorachi areas. (Horokanai belongs to Kamikawa Subprefectural Bureau.)
  - Ishikari Subprefectural Bureau (石狩振興局), Sapporo, covering Ishikari area
- Shiribeshi General Subprefectural Bureau (後志総合振興局), Kutchan, covering Shiribeshi area
- Iburi General Subprefectural Bureau (胆振総合振興局), Muroran, covering Iburi and Hidaka areas
  - Hidaka Subprefectural Bureau (日高振興局), Urakawa, covering Hidaka area
- Oshima General Subprefectural Bureau (渡島総合振興局), Hakodate, covering Oshima and Hiyama areas
  - Hiyama Subprefectural Bureau (檜山振興局), Esashi, covering Hiyama area
- Kamikawa General Subprefectural Bureau (上川総合振興局), Asahikawa, covering Kamikawa and Rumoi areas
  - Rumoi Subprefectural Bureau (留萌振興局), Rumoi, covering Rumoi area. (Horonobe belongs to Soya Subprefectural Bureau.)
- Sōya General Subprefectural Bureau (宗谷総合振興局), Wakkanai, covering Sōya area
- Okhotsk General Subprefectural Bureau (オホーツク総合振興局), Abashiri, covering Abashiri area
- Tokachi General Subprefectural Bureau (十勝総合振興局), Obihiro, covering Tokachi area
- Kushiro General Subprefectural Bureau (釧路総合振興局), Kushiro, covering Kushiro and Nemuro areas
  - Nemuro Subprefectural Bureau (根室振興局), Nemuro, covering Nemuro area
