= Okhotsk Subprefecture =

Coordinates: 44°01′36″N 144°15′39″E

Okhotsk Subprefecture オホーツク総合振興局
- Ohōtsuku-sōgō-shinkō-kyoku
- Prefecture: Hokkaido
- Capital: Abashiri

Area
  - Total: 10,690.09 km^{2} (4,127.47 sq mi)

Population (September 30, 2010)
  - Total: 309,487
  - Density: 28.9508/km^{2} (74.9823/sq mi)

Okhotsk Subprefecture (オホーツク総合振興局, Ohōtsuku-sōgō-shinkō-kyoku) is a subprefecture of Hokkaido Prefecture, Japan. It was renamed from the earlier Abashiri Subprefecture on April 1, 2010. Abashiri Subprefecture was established in 1897.

== Etymology ==
Abashiri Prefecture was named after the subprefectural office in Abashiri. However, the area was more commonly referred to as the Okhotsk region (オホーツク地方, Ohōtsuku-chihō), as it faces the Sea of Okhotsk, and the name Abashiri was changed to the more commonly used Okhotsk during the administrative redivision of Hokkaido's 14 subprefectures to 9 subprefectural bureaus in April, 2010. The sea is named for the port of Okhotsk, itself named for the Okhota, whose name is derived from the Even word окат (okat) meaning "river".

== Geography ==
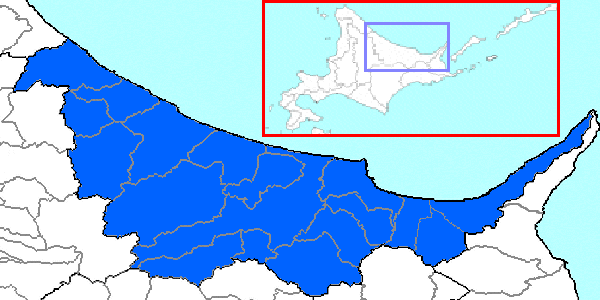
Okhotsk Subprefecture

=== Municipalities ===
Name		Area (km^{2})	Population	District	Type	Map
Rōmaji	Kanji	Area (km^{2})	Population	District	Type	Map
Abashiri (capital)	網走市	470.94	34,919	no district	City	
Bihoro	美幌町	438.36	20,920	Abashiri District	Town	
Engaru	遠軽町	1,332.32	20,757	Monbetsu District	Town	
Kitami	北見市	1,427.56	119,135	no district	City	
Kiyosato	清里町	402.73	4,222	Shari District	Town	
Koshimizu	小清水町	287.04	5,029	Shari District	Town	
Kunneppu	訓子府町	190.89	5,227	Tokoro District	Town	
Monbetsu	紋別市	830.7	22,983	no district	City	
Nishiokoppe	西興部村	308.12	1,120	Monbetsu District	Village	
Oketo	置戸町	527.54	3,042	Tokoro District	Town	
Okoppe	興部町	362.41	3,963	Monbetsu District	Town	
Ōmu	雄武町	637.03	4,596	Monbetsu District	Town	
Ōzora	大空町	343.62	7,430	Abashiri District	Town	
Saroma	佐呂間町	404.99	5,617	Tokoro District	Town	
Shari	斜里町	736.97	11,897	Shari District	Town	
Takinoue	滝上町	786.89	2,757	Monbetsu District	Town	
Tsubetsu	津別町	716.6	5,011	Abashiri District	Town	
Yūbetsu	湧別町	505.74	8,474	Monbetsu District	Town	
