= Kitami (train) =

Japanese limited rapid train service

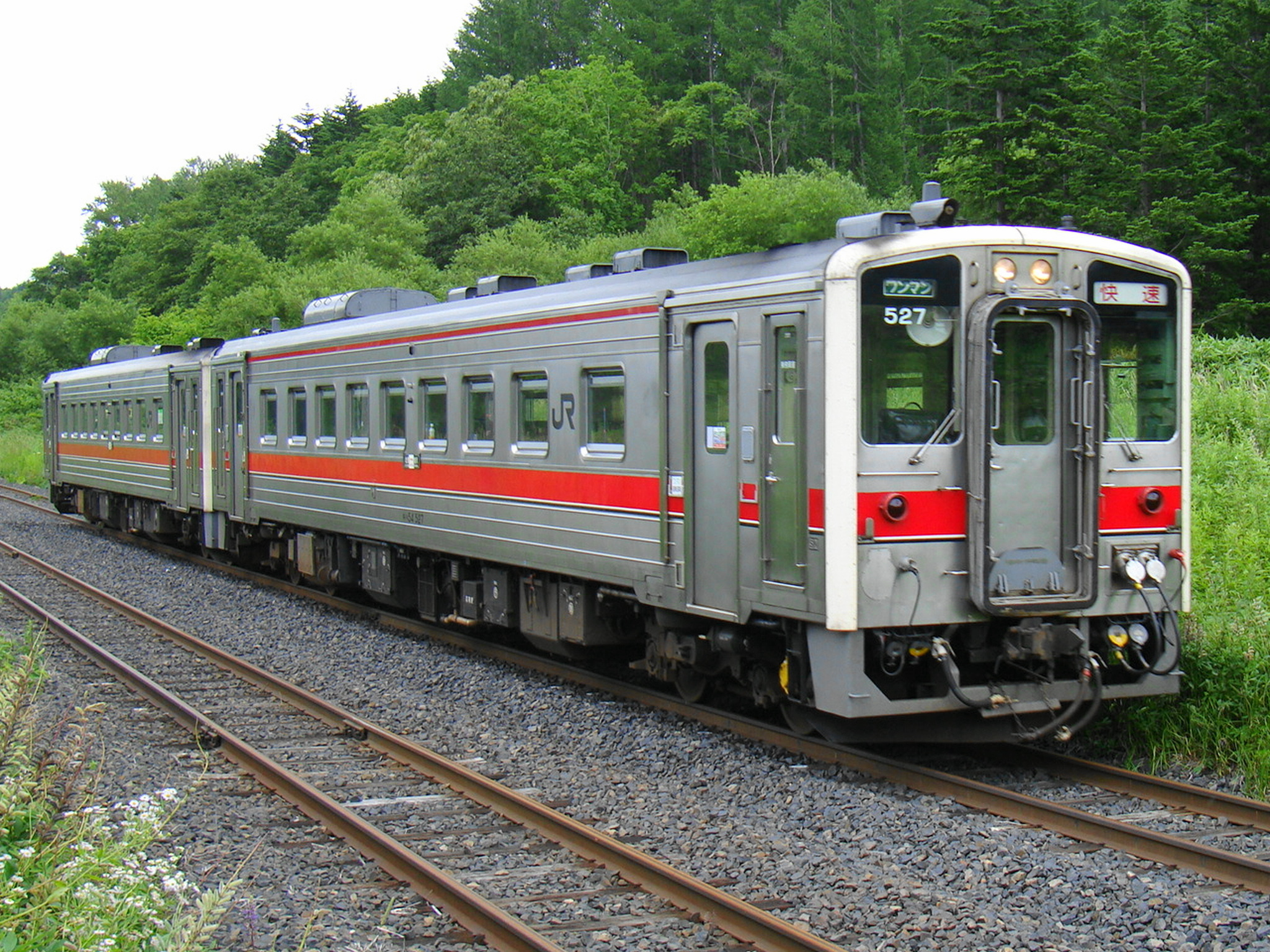
- Two KiHa 54 diesel cars on a Kitami service, July 2009

Overview
- Service type: Rapid
- Status: Operational
- First service: 19 March 1988
- Current operator: JR Hokkaido

Route
- Termini: Asahikawa; Abashiri
- Stops: 26
- Distance travelled: 237.7 km (147.7 mi)
- Average journey time: 4 hours 30 minutes approx.
- Service frequency: 1 return working daily
- Line used: Sekihoku Main Line

On-board services
- Class: Standard only
- Disabled access: Yes
- Sleeping arrangements: None
- Catering facilities: None
- Observation facilities: None
- Entertainment facilities: None
- Other facilities: Toilet

Technical
- Rolling stock: KiHa 54 DMU; KiHa 150 DMU
- Electrification: Diesel
- Operating speed: 110 km/h (68 mph) (Asahikawa - Shin-Asahikawa); 95 km/h (59 mph) (Shin-Asahikawa - Abashiri)
- Track owner: JR Hokkaido

The Kitami (きたみ) is a rapid (快速, kaisoku) train service operated by Hokkaido Railway Company (JR Hokkaido) in Hokkaido, Japan, since 1988. It runs from Asahikawa to Abashiri on the Sekihoku Main Line.

Prior to the March 2025 timetable revision, it was classified as a special rapid (特別快速, tokubetsu kaisoku) train and only ran as far as Kitami.

== Service pattern and station stops ==
There is one train per day in each direction, with the journey taking approximately 4 hours 30 minutes from Asahikawa to Abashiri.

Trains stop at the following stations.

- Asahikawa (A28)
- (Asahikawa-Yojo) (A29)
- (Shin-Asahikawa) (A30)
- (Minami-Nagayama) (A31)
- (Higashi-Asahikawa) (A32)
- (Sakuraoka) (A34)
- Tōma (A35)
- Kamikawa (A43)
- Shirataki (A45)
- Maruseppu (A48)
- Engaru (A50)
- Yasukuni (A51)
- Ikutahara (A53)
- Rubeshibe (A56)
- Ainonai (A57)
- Higashi-Ainonai (A58)
- Nishi-Kitami (A59)
- Kitami (A60)
- Hakuyō (A61)
- Itoshino (A62)
- Tanno (A63)
- Hiushinai (A64)
- Bihoro (A65)
- Nishi-Memambetsu (A66)
- Memambetsu (A67)
- Yobito (A68)
- Abashiri (A69)

Stations in brackets are only served by Kitami-bound (eastbound) trains.

== Rolling stock ==
Services are formed of one or two single-car KiHa 54 diesel cars based at Asahikawa Depot. Very occasionally, KiHa 150 diesel trains may be used.

== History ==
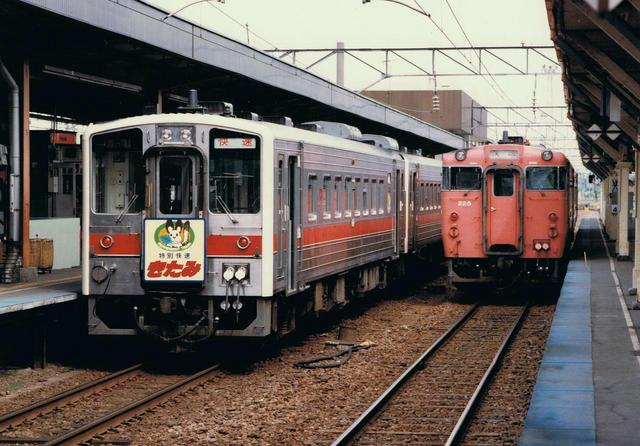
Kitami service with train headboard, June 1988

The Kitami service was first introduced from 19 March 1988 as a seasonal "special rapid" train service. From 3 November 1988, it became a regular daily service.

From 13 March 2004, the train became entirely no-smoking.

The service was extended from Kitami to Abashiri in 2025, and downgraded from "special rapid" to "rapid".
