= Aibetsu =

Town in Hokkaido, Japan

Aibetsu 愛別町
- Town
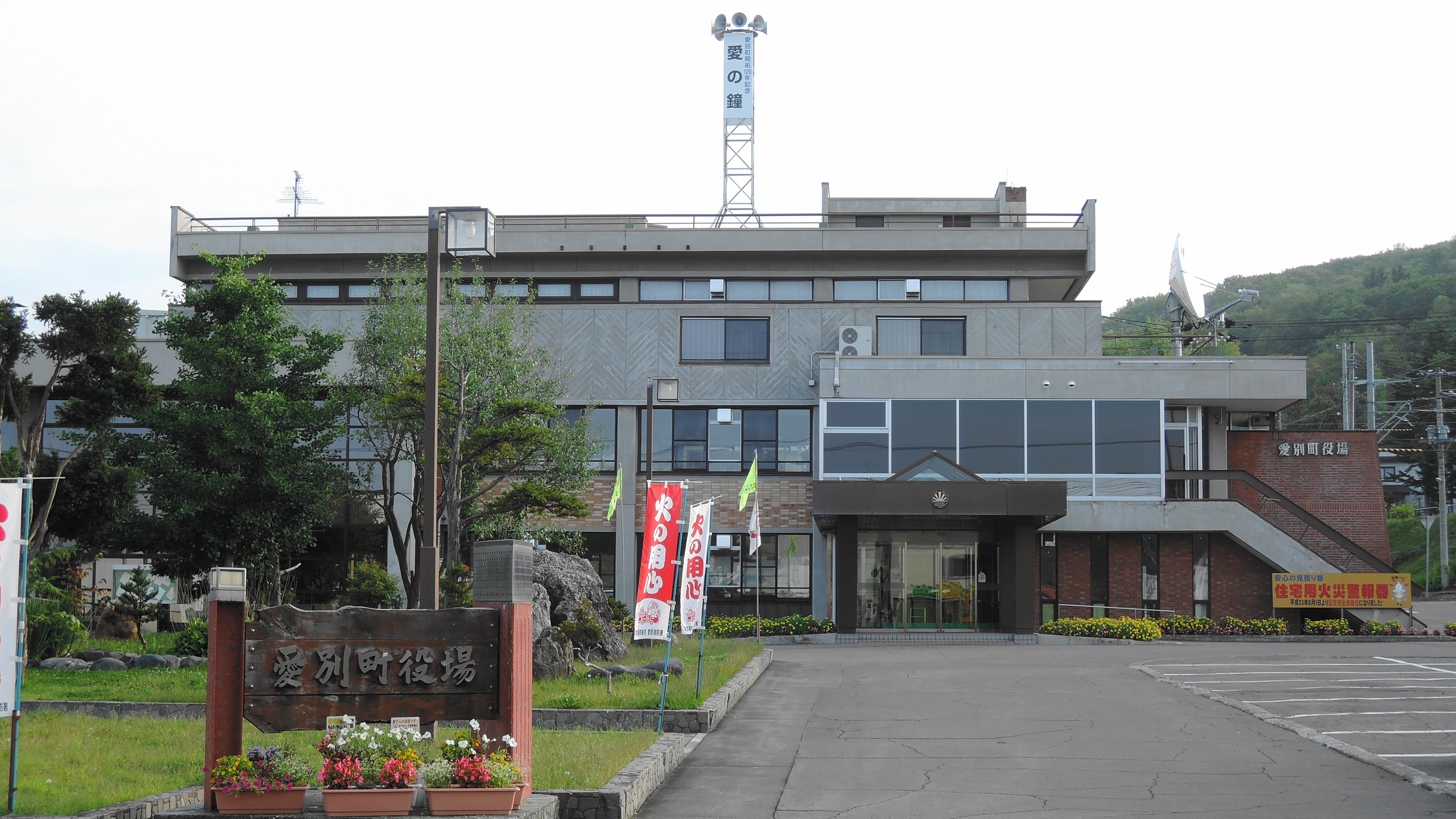
- Aibetsu town hall

- Flag Emblem
- Interactive map of Aibetsu
- Location in Japan
- Coordinates: 43°54′23″N 142°34′41″E
- Country: Japan
- Region: Hokkaido
- Prefecture: Hokkaido (Kamikawa Subprefecture)
- District: Kamikawa (Ishikari)

Area
  - Total: 250.13 km^{2} (96.58 sq mi)

Population (1 April 2024)
  - Total: 2,571
  - Density: 10.28/km^{2} (26.62/sq mi)
- Time zone: UTC+09:00 (JST)
- City hall address: 179 Honmachi, Aibetsu-cho, Kamikawa-gun, Hokkaido 078-1492
- Website: www.town.aibetsu.hokkaido.jp
- Symbols
- Flower: Rhododendron
- Mascot: Ai-chanman (あいちゃんマン) and Lovely-chan (ラブリーちゃん)
- Tree: Cherry blossom

Aibetsu (愛別町, Aibetsu-chō) is a town in Kamikawa Subprefecture, Hokkaido, Japan. As of 1 April 2024, the town had an estimated population of 2,571 in 1353 households, and a population density of 10 people per km^{2}. The total area of the town is 250.13 km^{2} (96.58 sq mi).

== Geography ==
Aibetsu is located at the confluence of the Ishikari River and the Aibetsu River at the northeastern end of the Kamikawa Basin.

=== Neighbouring municipalities ===
- Hokkaido
  - Shibetsu
  - Kamikawa
  - Tōma
  - Pippu

== Climate ==
Aibetsu has a Humid continental climate (Köppen Dfb) characterized by cold summers and cold winters with heavy snowfall. The average annual temperature in Aibetsu is 5.2 °C. The average annual rainfall is 1387 mm with September as the wettest month. The temperatures are highest on average in August, at around 19.4 °C, and lowest in January, at around −9.1 °C.

=== Demographics ===
Per Japanese census data, the population of Aibetsu is as shown below. The town is in a long period of sustained population loss.

Historical population
Year	Pop.	±%
1940	8,494	—
1950	9,337	+9.9%
1960	9,704	+3.9%
1970	7,443	−23.3%
1980	5,815	−21.9%
1990	4,735	−18.6%
2000	4,065	−14.1%
2010	3,328	−18.1%
2020	2,605	−21.7%

== History ==
The area of Aibetsu was part of Matsumae Domain in the Edo period. In 1895, 179 households of settlers from Wakayama, Gifu and Aichi settled in the Aibetsu area. In 1906 the second-class village of Aibetsu was established. In 1924 Kamikawa Village, Kamikawa District (currently Kamikawa Town) separated from Aibetsu. Aibetsu became a first-class village in 1937 and was raised to town status in 1961.

== Government ==
Aibetsu has a mayor-council form of government with a directly elected mayor and a unicameral town council of nine members. Aibetsu, collectively with the other municipalities of Kawakami sub-prefecture, contributes three members to the Hokkaidō Prefectural Assembly. In terms of national politics, the town is part of the Hokkaidō 6th district of the lower house of the Diet of Japan.

== Economy ==
Rice farming is the main industry, but mushroom cultivation, which began in 1972, is also a pillar of Aibetsu's agriculture, and the town is known as one of the leading "mushroom villages" in Hokkaido. Approximately 80% of the town area is forest, and forestry and woodworking are also thriving.

== Education ==
Aibetsu has two public schools, one elementary school and one junior high school operated by the town government. The town does not have a high school.

== Transportation ==
=== Railways ===
JR Hokkaido – Sekihoku Main Line

■ Aibetsu – Naka-Aibetsu – Antaroma

=== Highways ===
- Asahikawa-Monbetsu Expressway
- National Route 39

== Culture ==
=== Mascot ===
Ai-chanman and Lovely-chan, the town's mascots

Aibetsu's mascots are Ai-chanman (あいちゃんマン) and Lovely-chan (ラブリーちゃん).

- Ai-chanman is a superhero mushroom. He was unveiled in 1985.
- Lovely-chan, like Ai-chanman, is also a superhero mushroom. She is also Ai-chanman's lover.
