= Shōgunzan Station =

Railway station in Tōma, Hokkaido, Japan

Coordinates: 43.8576°N 142.5213°E

Shōgunzan Station 将軍山駅
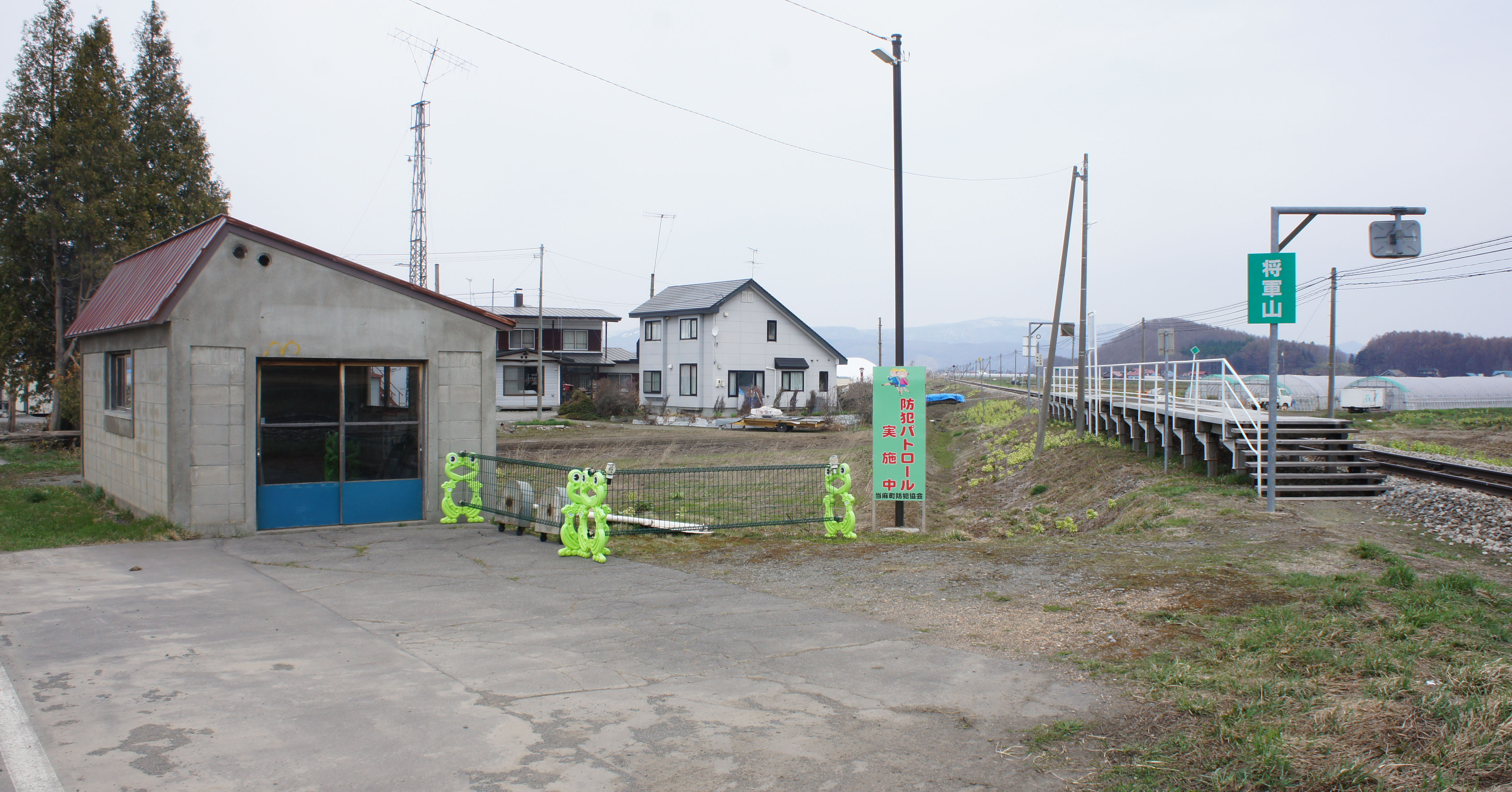

General information
- Location: Kamikawa, Hokkaido; Japan
- Operator: Hokkaido Railway Company
- Line: Sekihoku Main Line

Other information
- Station code: A36

History
- Opened: 1960
- Closed: 13 March 2021
Location

Shōgunzan Station (将軍山駅, Shōgunzan-eki) was a railway station in Tōma, Kamikawa District (Ishikari), Hokkaidō Prefecture, Japan. Its station number is A36.

== Lines ==
- Hokkaido Railway Company

- Sekihoku Main Line

== Adjacent stations ==
«	Service	»
Sekihoku Main Line
Limited Rapid Kitami: Does not stop at this station
Limited Express Okhotsk: Does not stop at this station
Limited Express Taisetsu: Does not stop at this station
Tōma	Local	Ikaushi
