= Tōun Station =

Railway station in Kamikawa, Hokkaido, Japan

Coordinates: 43°50′37″N 142°43′00″E

Tōun Station 東雲駅
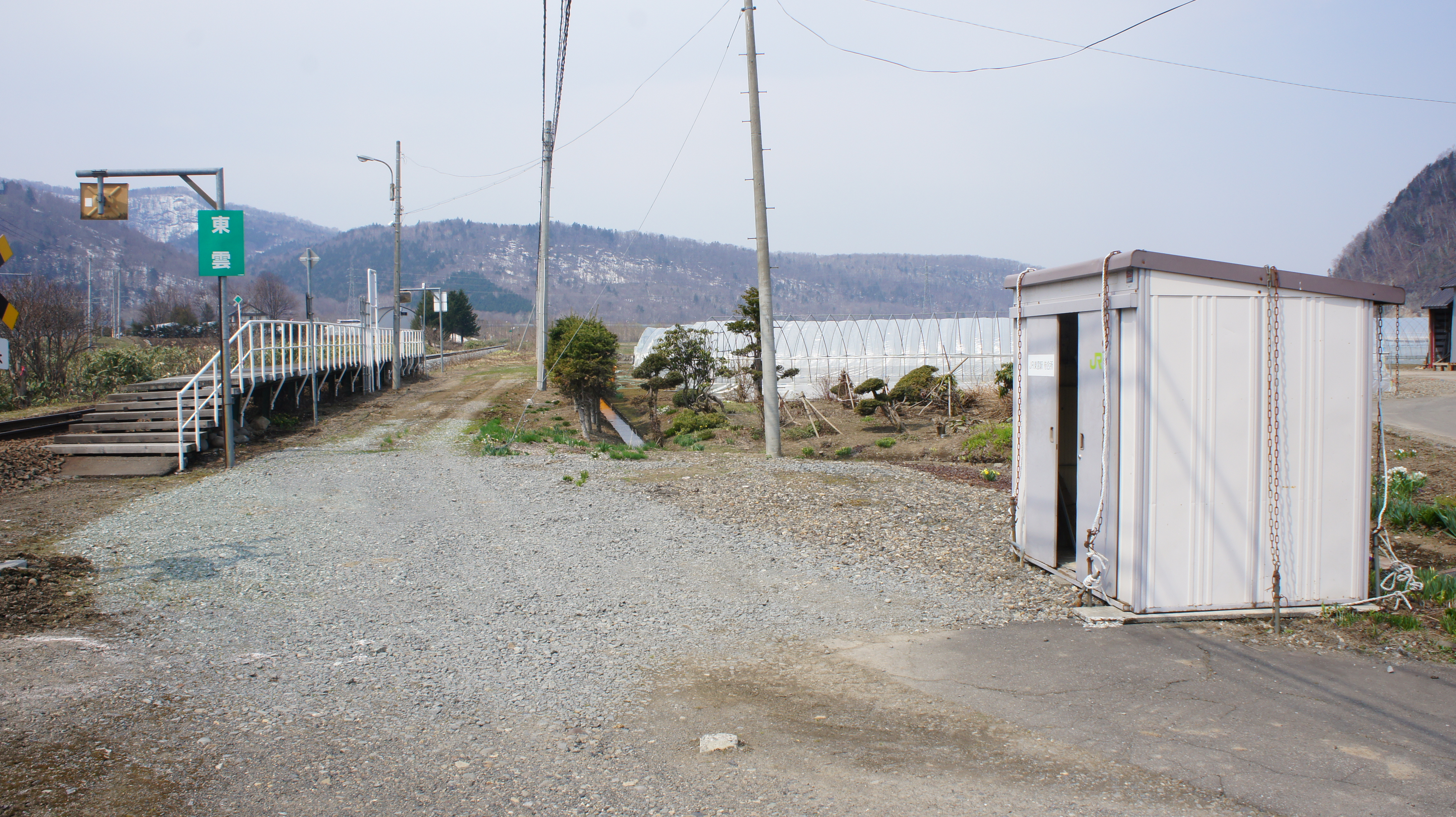
- Toun Station Site

General information
- Location: Kamikawa, Hokkaido; Japan
- Operator: Hokkaido Railway Company
- Line: Sekihoku Main Line

Other information
- Station code: A42

History
- Opened: 1960
- Closed: 13 March 2021
Location

Tōun Station (東雲駅, Tōun-eki) was a railway station in Kamikawa, Hokkaidō Prefecture, Japan. Its station number is A42.

== Lines ==
- Hokkaido Railway Company

- Sekihoku Main Line

== Layout ==
The station has one platform with one track.

== Adjacent stations ==
«	Service	»
Sekihoku Main Line
Limited Rapid Kitami: Does not stop at this station
Limited Express Okhotsk: Does not stop at this station
Limited Express Taisetsu: Does not stop at this station
Antaroma	Local	Kamikawa
