= Aizan =

Aizan may refer to:

== Japan-related ==
- Aizan Station (Japanese: 愛山駅), former railway station in Aibetsu, Hokkaidō Prefecture, Japan until 2024
- Yamaji Aizan (Japanese: 山路愛山; 1865–1917), Japanese writer, journalist, and historian

== Other uses ==
- Aizan and Sasan, Ethiopian Catholic saints; see List of Africans venerated in the Catholic Church
- Ayizan, loa of the marketplace in Vodou
- Orkney Scots for combustion
