= Kita-Hinode Station =

Railway station in Asahikawa, Hokkaido, Japan

Coordinates: 43°46′55″N 142°27′58″E

Kita-Hinode Station 北日ノ出駅
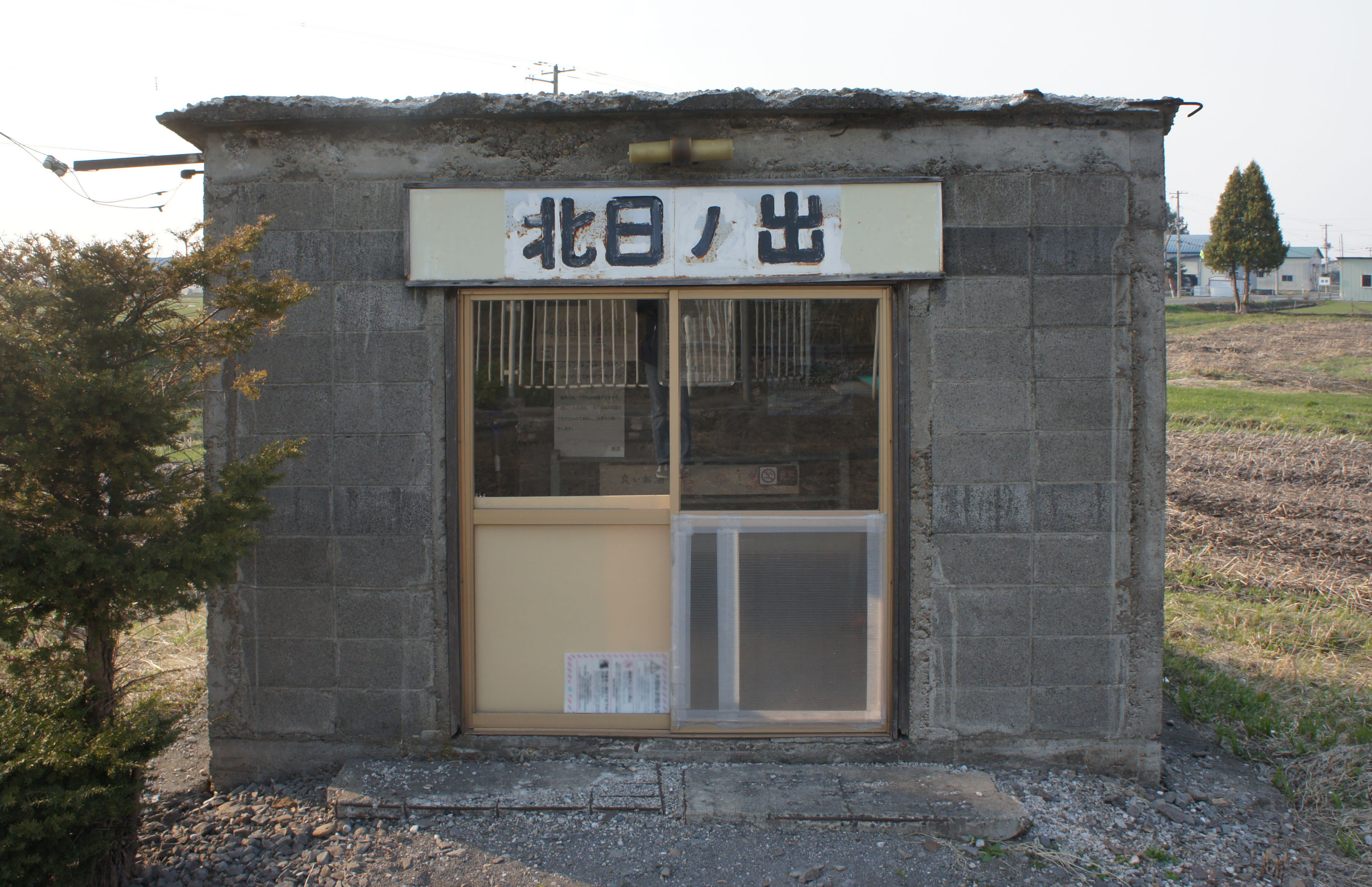
- Station Building

General information
- Location: Asahikawa, Hokkaido; Japan
- Operator: Hokkaido Railway Company
- Line: Sekihoku Main Line

Other information
- Station code: A33

History
- Opened: 1960
- Closed: 13 March 2021
Location

Kita-Hinode Station (北日ノ出駅, Kita-Hinode-eki) was a railway station in Asahikawa, Hokkaidō Prefecture, Japan. Its station number is A33.

== Lines ==
- Hokkaido Railway Company

- Sekihoku Main Line

== Adjacent stations ==
«	Service	»
Sekihoku Main Line
Limited Rapid Kitami: Does not stop at this station
Limited Express Okhotsk: Does not stop at this station
Limited Express Taisetsu: Does not stop at this station
Higashi-Asahikawa	Local	Sakuraoka
