= Aizan Station =

Railway station in Aibetsu, Hokkaido, Japan

Aizan Station 愛山駅
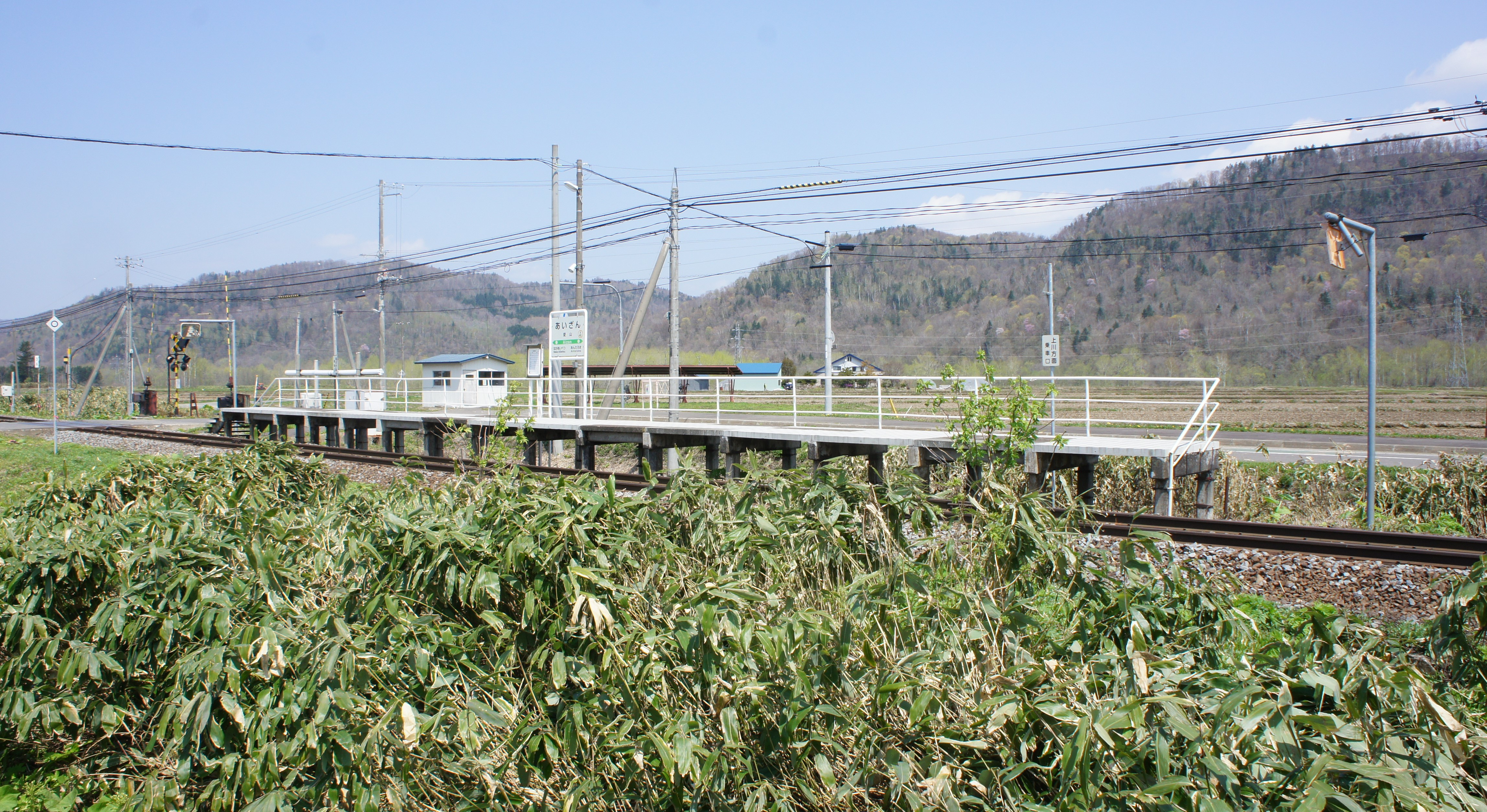
- View of Aizan Station

General information
- Location: Aibetsu, Kamikawa, Hokkaidō Prefecture; Japan
- Coordinates: 43.8664°N 142.6800°E
- Operator: Hokkaido Railway Company
- Line: Sekihoku Main Line

Construction
- Accessible: No

History
- Closed: 16 March 2024
Location

Aizan Station (愛山駅, Aizan-eki) was a railway station in Aibetsu, Kamikawa, Hokkaidō Prefecture, Japan. Its station number was A40.

== Lines ==
- Hokkaido Railway Company
  - Sekihoku Main Line

== History ==
In June 2023, this station was selected to be among 42 stations on the JR Hokkaido network to be slated for abolition owing to low ridership. The last train served the station on 15 March 2024 and the station was officially closed the next day.

== Adjacent stations ==
«	Service	»
Sekihoku Main Line
Limited Rapid Kitami: Does not stop at this station
Limited Express Okhotsk: Does not stop at this station
Limited Express Taisetsu: Does not stop at this station
Naka-Aibetsu	Local	Antaroma
