= Hakuyō Station =

Railway station in Kitami, Hokkaido, Japan

Coordinates: 43.8247°N 143.9170°E

Hakuyō Station 柏陽駅
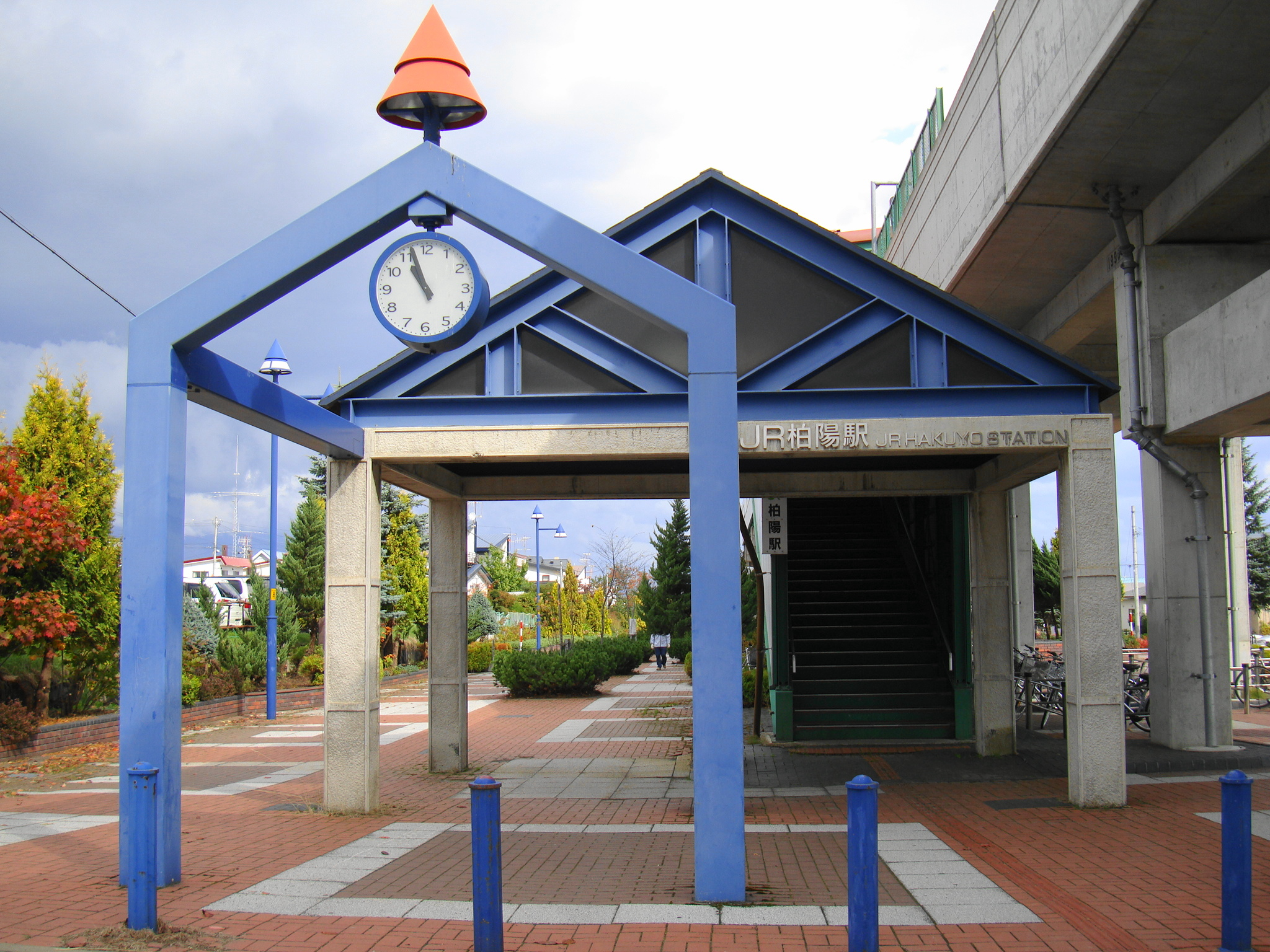
- Elevated station entrance, October 2009

General information
- Location: Kitami, Hokkaido; Japan
- Operator: JR Hokkaidō
- Line: Sekihoku Main Line
Location

Hakuyō Station (柏陽駅, Hakuyō-eki) is a railway station located in the neighbourhood of Namiki in Kitami city in Hokkaidō, Japan, and is located on the JR Sekihoku Main Line operated by JR Hokkaidō.

== Station structure ==
The station is elevated. The station is unstaffed, and consists of a single railway line and a single side platform. The station is mainly used by students commuting to a local senior high school.

== Station environs ==
Because the town is becoming a residential area of Kitami, there are many shops and other businesses. Kitami Institute of Technology, Kitami-Hakuyō Senior High School, Japanese Red Cross Hokkaido College of Nursing and National Highway 39 are all nearby.

== History ==
- December 1, 1957: Temporary platform opened.
- April 1, 1987: Station status upgraded.
- October 1, 1992: Overhead station building constructed.

== Adjacent stations ==
«	Service	»
Sekihoku Main Line
Limited Express Okhotsk: Does not stop at this station
Limited Express Taisetsu: Does not stop at this station
Kitami	Local	Itoshino
