= Tanno Station =

Railway station in Kitami, Hokkaido, Japan

Coordinates: 43.8514°N 143.9425°E

Tanno Station 端野駅
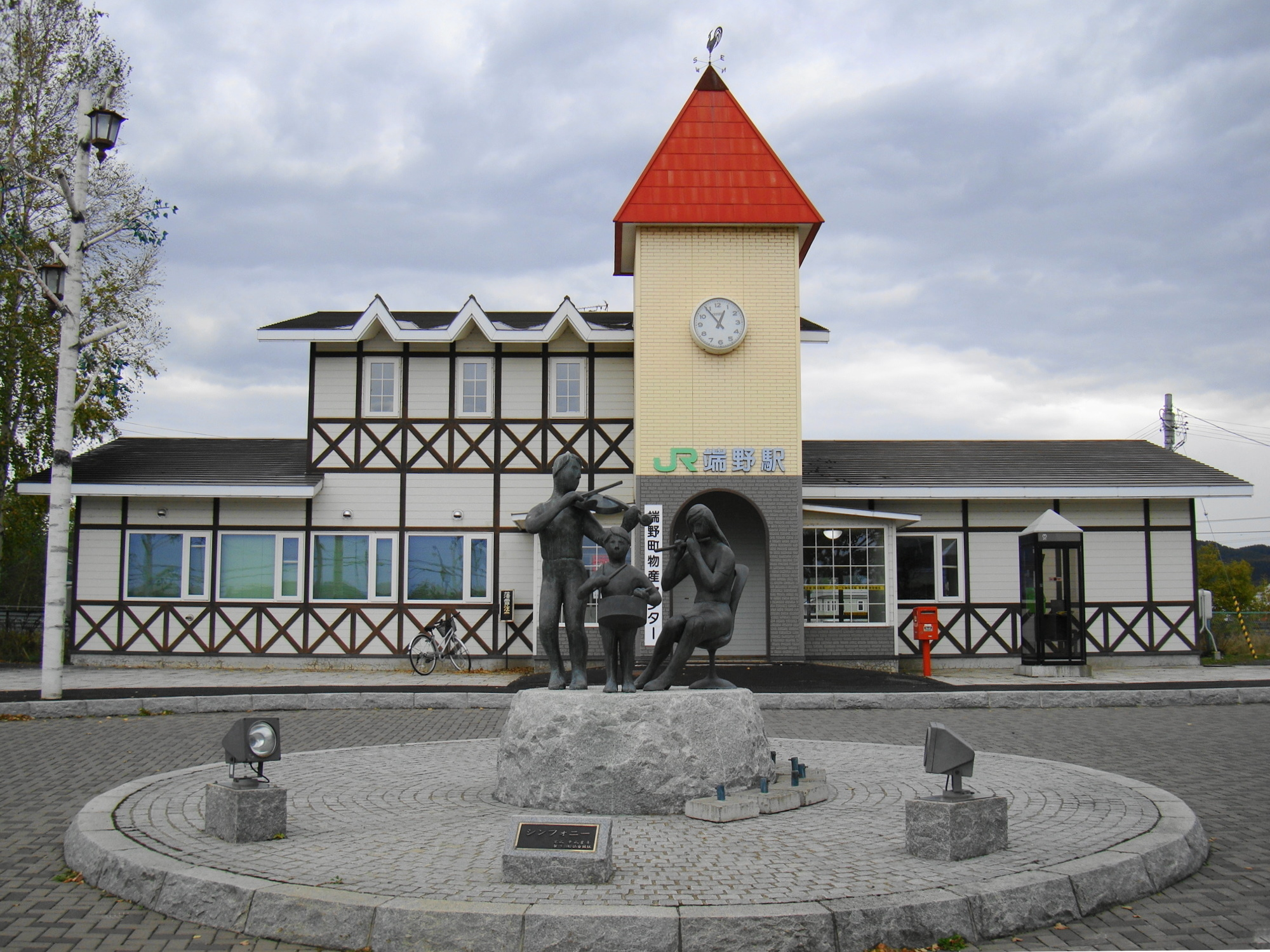
- Station building

General information
- Location: Tannochotanno, Kitami, Hokkaido （北海道北見市端野町端野） Japan
- Operator: JR Hokkaido
- Line: Sekihoku Main Line

Other information
- Station code: A63

History
- Opened: 1912
Location

Tanno Station (端野駅, Tanno-eki) is a railway station located in the Tannocho neighbourhood of Kitami city in Hokkaidō, Japan, and services the Sekihoku Main Line operated by JR Hokkaido.

== Station structure ==
The station is above ground and has two side platforms alongside two railway tracks. It is not permanently staffed.

== Adjacent stations ==
«	Service	»
Sekihoku Main Line
Limited Express Okhotsk: Does not stop at this station
Limited Express Taisetsu: Does not stop at this station
Itoshino	Local	Hiushinai

== History ==
- October 5, 1912: Station opened.
- Station unstaffed since completion of CTC system.
- February 1991: Station building renovated.
