= Sekihoku Main Line =

Railway line in Hokkaido, Japan

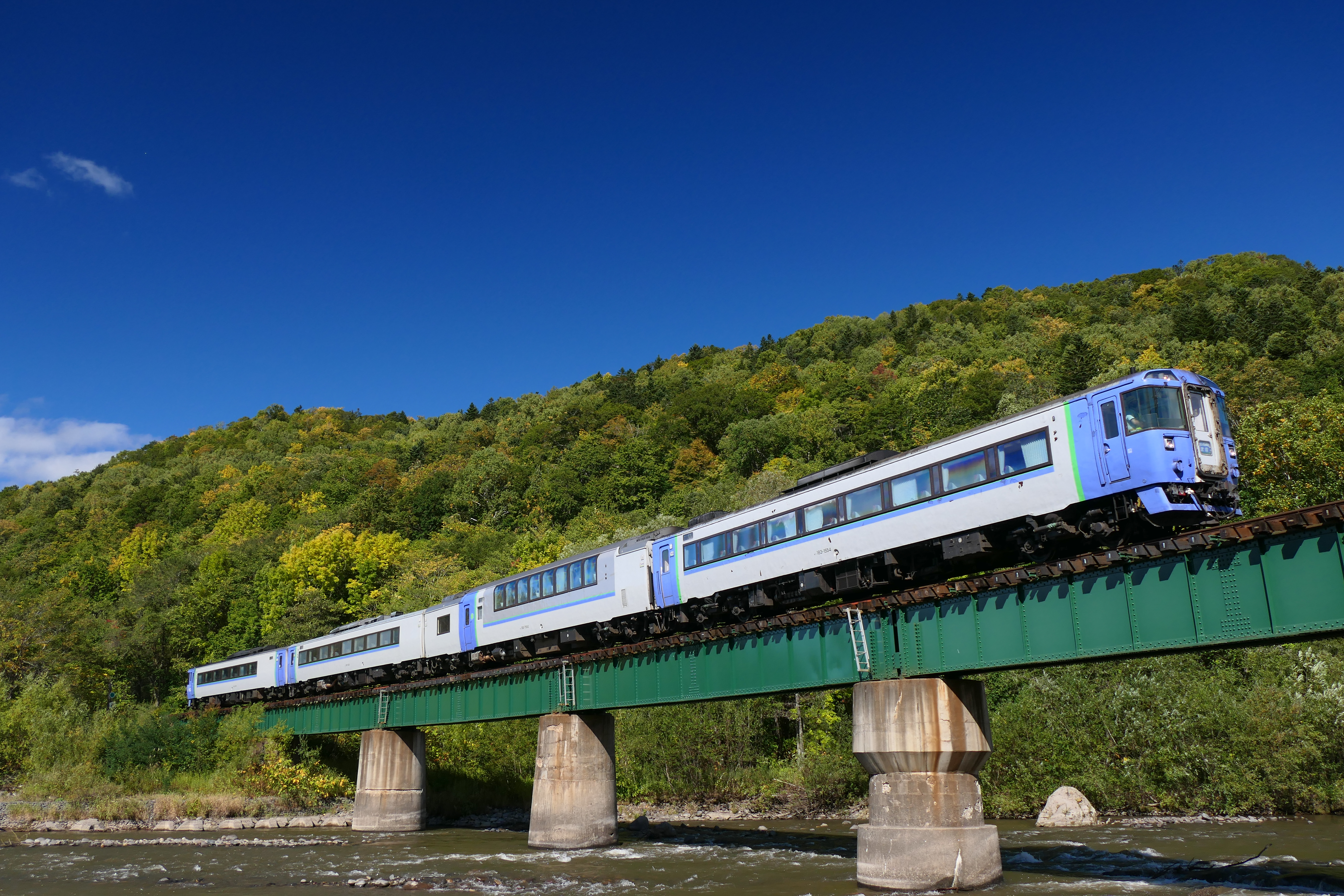
- Taisetsu limited express train from Asahikawa to Abashiri

Overview
- Native name: 石北本線
- Status: In operation
- Owner: JR Hokkaido
- Locale: Hokkaido
- Termini: Shin-Asahikawa; Abashiri
- Stations: 31

Service
- Type: Heavy rail
- Operator(s): JR Hokkaido, JR Freight
- Rolling stock: KiHa 283 series DMU, KiHa 40 series DMU, KiHa 54 series DMU, KiHa 150 series DMU

History
- Opened: 1932; 94 years ago

Technical
- Line length: 234.0 km (145.4 mi)
- Number of tracks: Entire line single tracked
- Character: Rural
- Track gauge: 1,067 mm (3 ft 6 in)
- Electrification: None
- Operating speed: 110 km/h (68 mph)
Route map

Sekihoku Main Line (石北本線, Sekihoku-honsen) is a railway line in Hokkaido, Japan, operated by Hokkaido Railway Company (JR Hokkaido) between Shin-Asahikawa in Asahikawa and Abashiri Station in Abashiri. The name comes from the first Kanji characters of Ishikari Province (石狩国) and Kitami Province (北見国), names of 19th century provinces along the line.

On 19 November 2016, JR Hokkaido's President announced plans to rationalize the network by up to 1,237 km (769 mi), or ~50% of the current network, including the proposed conversion to Third Sector operation of the Sekihoku Main Line, but if local governments are not agreeable, the line will face closure.

== Basic data ==
- Operators, distances
  - Hokkaido Railway Company (Services and tracks)
    - Whole line, from Shin-Asahikawa to Abashiri: 234.0 km (145.4 mi)
  - Japan Freight Railway Company (Services)
    - From Shin-Asahikawa to Kitami: 181.0 km (112.5 mi)
- Signal boxes: 4
- Track: single
- Block system: Automatic

== Services ==
The Okhotsk limited express train, named after the Sea of Okhotsk, runs from Sapporo to Abashiri with two daily return workings. The Taisetsu limited express train runs from Asahikawa to Abashiri with two return workings daily. The rapid train Kitami operates between Asahikawa and Abashiri, with one return service daily.

Local services along the line are roughly divided into three segments. In the segment between Asahikawa and Kamikawa, the line functions as a commuter rail of Asahikawa City. There is one local train service per one to two hours. The segment between Kamikawa and Engaru is a sparsely populated area. Between Kamikawa and Shirataki, a local train runs one lap per day. For the segment between Engaru and Abashiri, there is one local train service per one to two hours.

== Stations ==
LE: Limited Express Okhotsk/Taisetsu
LR: Limited Rapid Kitami
All non-local trains stop at stations marked +, Some stop at those marked *, No such trains (other than local) stop at those marked -. Local trains may skip stations marked ◌.

| Station | | | Distance (km) | LE | LR | Transfers | Location |
Asahikawa to Shin-Asahikawa: officially Sōya Main Line
| A28 | Asahikawa | 旭川 | -3.7 | + | + | ■ Hakodate Main Line ■ Sōya Main Line ■ Furano Line | Asahikawa |
| A29 | Asahikawa-Yojō | 旭川四条 | -1.9 | - | - | ■ Sōya Main Line | Asahikawa |
| A30 | Shin-Asahikawa | 新旭川 | 0.0 | - | - | ■ Sōya Main Line | Asahikawa |
Sekihoku Main Line
| A31 | Minami-Nagayama | 南永山 | 2.5 | - | - | | Asahikawa |
| A32 | Higashi-Asahikawa | 東旭川 | 5.2 | - | - | | Asahikawa |
| A33 | Sakuraoka | 桜岡 | 10.2 | - | - | | Asahikawa |
| A34 | Tōma | 当麻 | 13.9 | - | + | | Tōma, Kamikawa |
| A37 | Ikaushi | 伊香牛 | 19.5 | - | - | | Tōma, Kamikawa |
| A38 | Aibetsu | 愛別 | 25.9 | - | - | | Aibetsu, Kamikawa |
| A39 | Naka-Aibetsu | 中愛別 | 32.0 | - | - | | Aibetsu, Kamikawa |
| A41 | Antaroma | 安足間 | 38.0 | - | - | | Aibetsu, Kamikawa |
| A43 | Kamikawa | 上川 | 44.9 | + | + | | Kamikawa, Kamikawa |
| A45 | Shirataki | 白滝 | 82.2 | * | + | | Engaru, Monbetsu |
| A48 | Maruseppu | 丸瀬布 | 101.9 | * | + | | Engaru, Monbetsu |
| A49 | Setose | 瀬戸瀬 | 109.7 | - | - | | Engaru, Monbetsu |
| A50 | Engaru | 遠軽 | 120.8 | + | + | ■ ~~Nayoro Main Line~~ (Closed 1989) | Engaru, Monbetsu |
| A51 | Yasukuni | 安国 | 128.8 | - | + | | Engaru, Monbetsu |
| A53 | Ikutahara | 生田原 | 137.7 | + | + | | Engaru, Monbetsu |
| A55 | Nishi-Rubeshibe | 西留辺蘂 | 156.2 | - | - | | Kitami |
| A56 | Rubeshibe | 留辺蘂 | 158.2 | + | + | | Kitami |
| A57 | Ainonai | 相内 | 169.1 | - | + | | Kitami |
| A58 | Higashi-Ainonai | 東相内 | 173.7 | - | + | | Kitami |
| A59 | Nishi-Kitami | 西北見 | 176.3 | - | + | | Kitami |
| A60 | Kitami | 北見 | 181.0 | + | + | ■ ~~Furusato Ginga Line~~ (Closed 2006) | Kitami |
| A61 | Hakuyō | 柏陽 | 183.7 | - | | | Kitami |
| A62 | Itoshino | 愛し野 | 185.9 | - | | | Kitami |
| A63 | Tanno | 端野 | 187.3 | - | | | Kitami |
| A64 | Hiushinai | 緋牛内 | 194.6 | - | | | Kitami |
| A65 | Bihoro | 美幌 | 206.1 | + | | ■ ~~Aioi Line~~ (Closed 1985) | Bihoro, Abashiri |
| A66 | Nishi-Memambetsu ◌ | 西女満別 | 213.1 | - | | | Ōzora, Abashiri |
| A67 | Memambetsu | 女満別 | 218.1 | + | | | Ōzora, Abashiri |
| A68 | Yobito | 呼人 | 225.9 | - | | | Abashiri |
| A69 | Abashiri | 網走 | 234.0 | + | | ■ Senmō Main Line ■ ~~Yūmō Line~~ (Closed 1987) | Abashiri |

=== Closed Stations ===
- Nakakoshi, Oku-Shirataki and Temmaku: Since 1 July 2001, of which Nakakoshi and Oku-Shirataki downgraded to signal bases
- Shin-sakaeno: Since 18 March 2006
- A44 Kami-Shirataki, A54 Kanehana, A46 Kyū-Shirataki and A47 Shimo-Shirataki: Since 26 March 2016, of which Kanehana and Shimo-Shirataki downgraded to signal bases
- A52 Ikuno, A33 Kita-Hinode, A36 Shōgunzan and A42 Tōun: Since 13 March 2021
- A40 Aizan: Since 16 March 2024

== History ==
The principal route between Sapporo and Okhotsk Subprefecture has changed several times. Originally, the route was the Hakodate Main Line to Asahikawa, then the southbound Nemuro Main Line and then the northbound line from Ikeda, via the Abashiri Main Line (網走本線, Abashiri-honsen) to Kitami. The route shortened by 53.5 km (33.2 mi) when the section between Takikawa and Furano on the Nemuro Main Line opened in 1913.

Another route, northbound from Asahikawa to Nayoro, then southeast to Kitami was completed as the Nayoro Main Line (名寄本線, Nayoro-honsen) and Yūbetsu Line (湧別線, Yūbetsu-sen) in 1921.

A third route was a shortcut between Asahikawa and Engaru, straight through the Kitami Pass. The Sekihoku Line (石北線, Sekihoku-sen), completed in 1932, finally completed the main route still used today.

The current Sekihoku Main Line consists of the remnants of these three lines. The section between Shin-Asahikawa and Engaru is from the Sekihoku Line, the section between Engaru and Kitami from the Yūbetsu Line, and the section between Kitami and Abashiri from the Abashiri Main Line.

The first of the above-mentioned sections to open was from Abashiri to Kitami in 1912. The Kitami to Engaru line was opened between 1912 and 1915 as a 762 mm (2 ft 6 in) gauge line, but was converted to 1,067 mm (3 ft 6 in) gauge in 1916.

The Asahikawa to Kamikawa section opened between 1922 and 1923, and the Engaru to Shiritaki section between 1927 and 1929. The final section, including the Ishikita tunnel, opened in 1932.

In July 2015, JR Hokkaido announced that it would be closing four stations line (Shimo-Shirataki Station, Kyu-Shirataki Station, Kami-Shirataki Station, and Kanehana Station) in March 2016, due to low passenger usage.

== See also ==
- List of railway lines in Japan
