= Tōma =

Tōma 当麻町
- Town
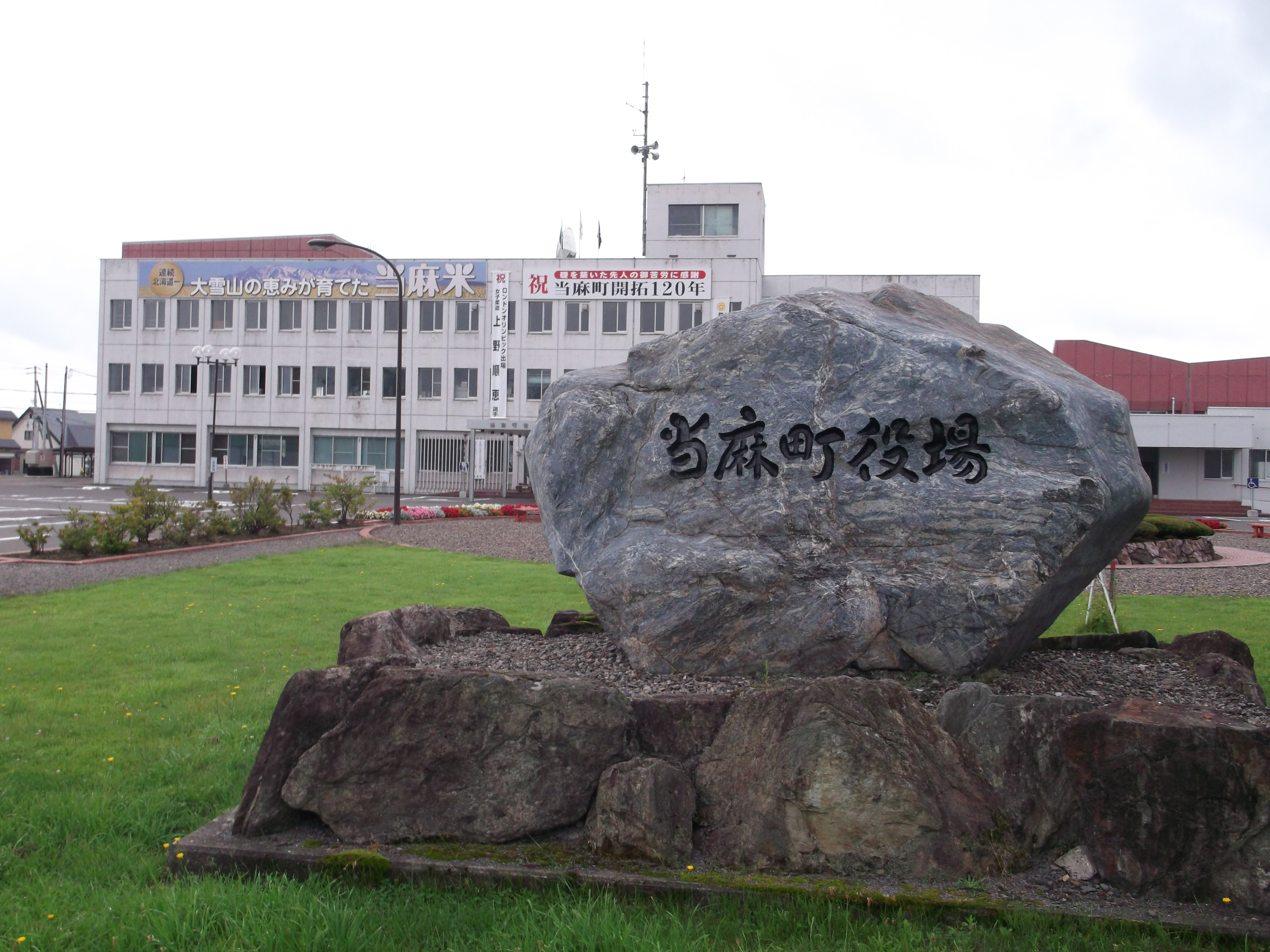
- Tōma town hall

- Flag Seal
- Location of Tōma in Hokkaido (Kamikawa Subprefecture)

- Location in Japan
- Coordinates: 43°49′41″N 142°30′29″E
- Country: Japan
- Region: Hokkaido
- Prefecture: Hokkaido (Kamikawa Subprefecture)
- District: Kamikawa (Ishikari)

Area
  - Total: 204.90 km^{2} (79.11 sq mi)

Population (January 1, 2025)
  - Total: 6,119
  - Density: 29.86/km^{2} (77.35/sq mi)
- Time zone: UTC+09:00 (JST)
- City hall address: 11-1, 3-jo Higashi 2-chome, Touma-cho, Kamikawa-gun, Hokkaido 078-1393
- Website: Official website
- Symbols
- Flower: Chrysanthemum
- Tree: Japanese yew

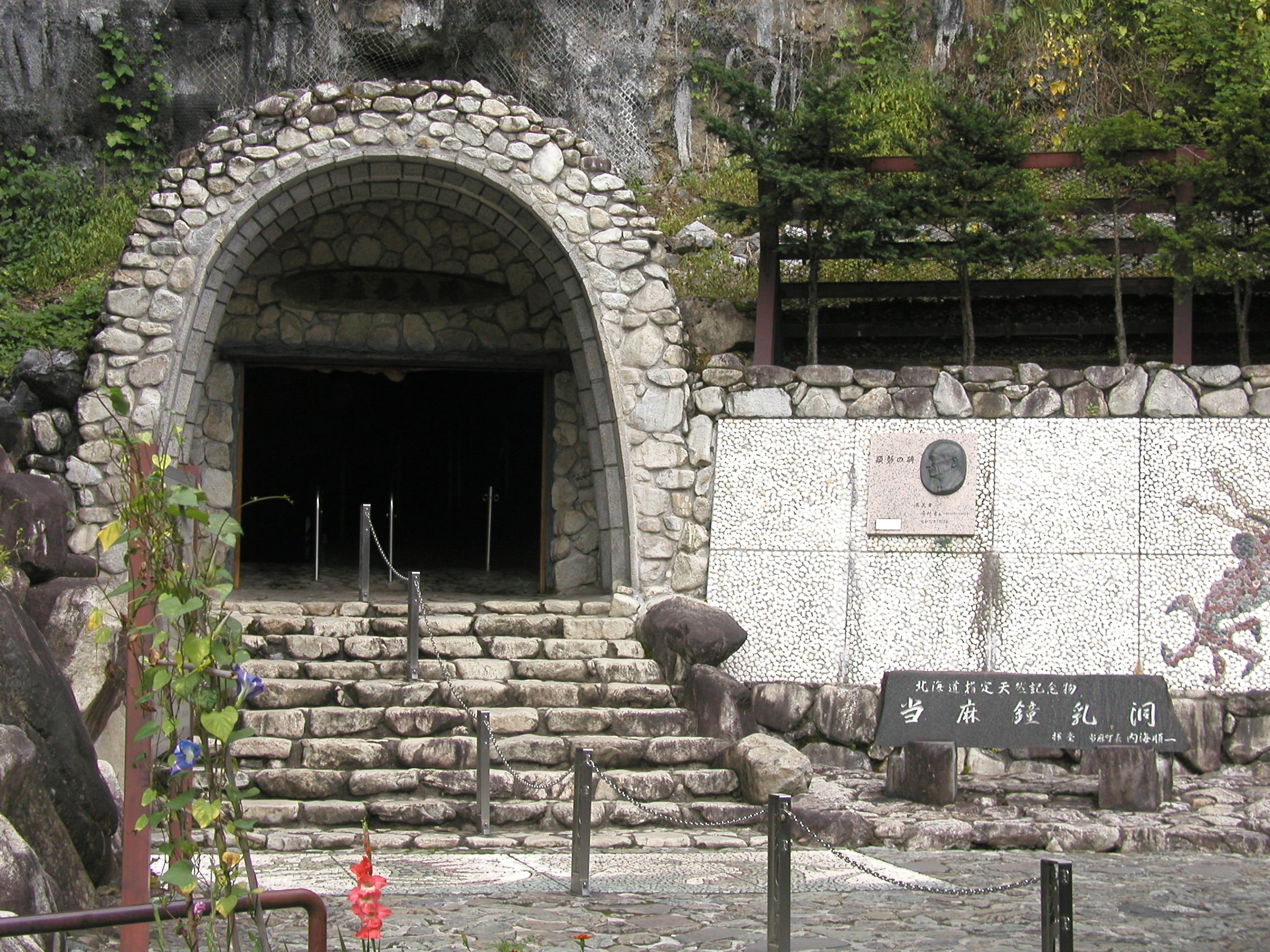
Tōma Caves

Tōma (当麻町, Tōma-chō) is a town located in Kamikawa Subprefecture, Hokkaido, Japan. As of 1 January 2025, the town had an estimated population of 6,119 in 3033 households, and a population density of 30 people per km^{2}. The total area of the town is 204.90 km^{2} (79.11 sq mi).

== Geography ==
Tōma is located on the eastern edge of the Kamikawa Basin, and the mountainous area to the east of the town continues into the Daisetsuzan mountain range. The Ishikari River flows along the border with Pippu Town, and its tributary, the Ushishube River, flows through the town.

=== Neighbouring municipalities ===
- Hokkaido
  - Asahikawa
  - Pippu
  - Aibetsu
  - Kamikawa

=== Demographics ===
Per Japanese census data, the population of Tōma is as shown below. The town is in a long period of sustained population loss.

Historical population
Year	Pop.	±%
1940	9,411	—
1950	13,410	+42.5%
1960	13,592	+1.4%
1970	11,068	−18.6%
1980	9,619	−13.1%
1990	8,383	−12.8%
2000	7,643	−8.8%
2010	7,088	−7.3%
2020	6,319	−10.8%

== History ==
The area of Tōma was part of Matsumae Domain in the Edo period. In 1893, 400 tondenhei soldier/settlers colonized the area. In 1906 the second-class village of Tōma was established. It became a first-class village in 1919 and was raised to town status in 1958.

== Government ==
Tōma has a mayor-council form of government with a directly elected mayor and a unicameral town council of ten members. Tōma, collectively with the other municipalities of Kawakami sub-prefecture, contributes three members to the Hokkaidō Prefectural Assembly. In terms of national politics, the town is part of the Hokkaidō 6th district of the lower house of the Diet of Japan.

== Economy ==
The primary industry, centered on rice farming, is the main industry. In addition roses, chrysanthemums, cucumbers, and tomatoes are also cultivated. Local specialties include densuke watermelons (でんすけスイカ) known throughout Japan, and imazuri mai rice, voted "Most Delicious Rice In Hokkaido 7 Years In A Row". Watermelon-flavored soft-serve ice cream, ramen noodles, senbei and more are available year-round at the town's Roadside Station or Michi no Eki (道の駅), located on National Route 39.

The Tōma Town Forestry Association, which is responsible for managing private forests in the town, is responsible for management, operation, and lumbering, and is also working to promote local production and consumption by using timber produced in the town for public facilities and subsidizing the use of timber produced in the town for private homes.

== Education ==
Tōma has two public elementary schools and one public junior high school operated by the town government. The town does not have a high school.

== Transportation ==
=== Railways ===
JR Hokkaido - Sekihoku Main Line

■ Tōma - Ikaushi

=== Highways ===
- National Route 39

== Local attractions ==
In the late 1990s, the town government embarked on a campaign to make Tohma the number one "sports town" in Japan. While bubble-era funding eventually dried up, a number of first rate sports facilities and tourist attractions are still in operation today. Among these are a campground, large children's obstacle course, tennis courts, soccer, baseball and softball fields, park golf course, ski slope (beginner level with 1 rope lift only) and sports center. In addition, the town is also home to the Papillion Chateau insect museum, the Tōma Shōnyūdō Limestone Cave (one of the few in Hokkaido), and Healthy Chateau, a medium-sized hot spring.

== Culture ==
=== Mascot ===
Ryuta-kun, the town's mascot

Tōma's mascot is Ryuta-kun (おとっきー). He is a green dragon. Because he is based on a local legend, he resides at the Toma Limestone Cave.
