= Antaroma Station =

Railway station in Aibetsu, Hokkaido, Japan

A41 Antaroma Station 安足間駅
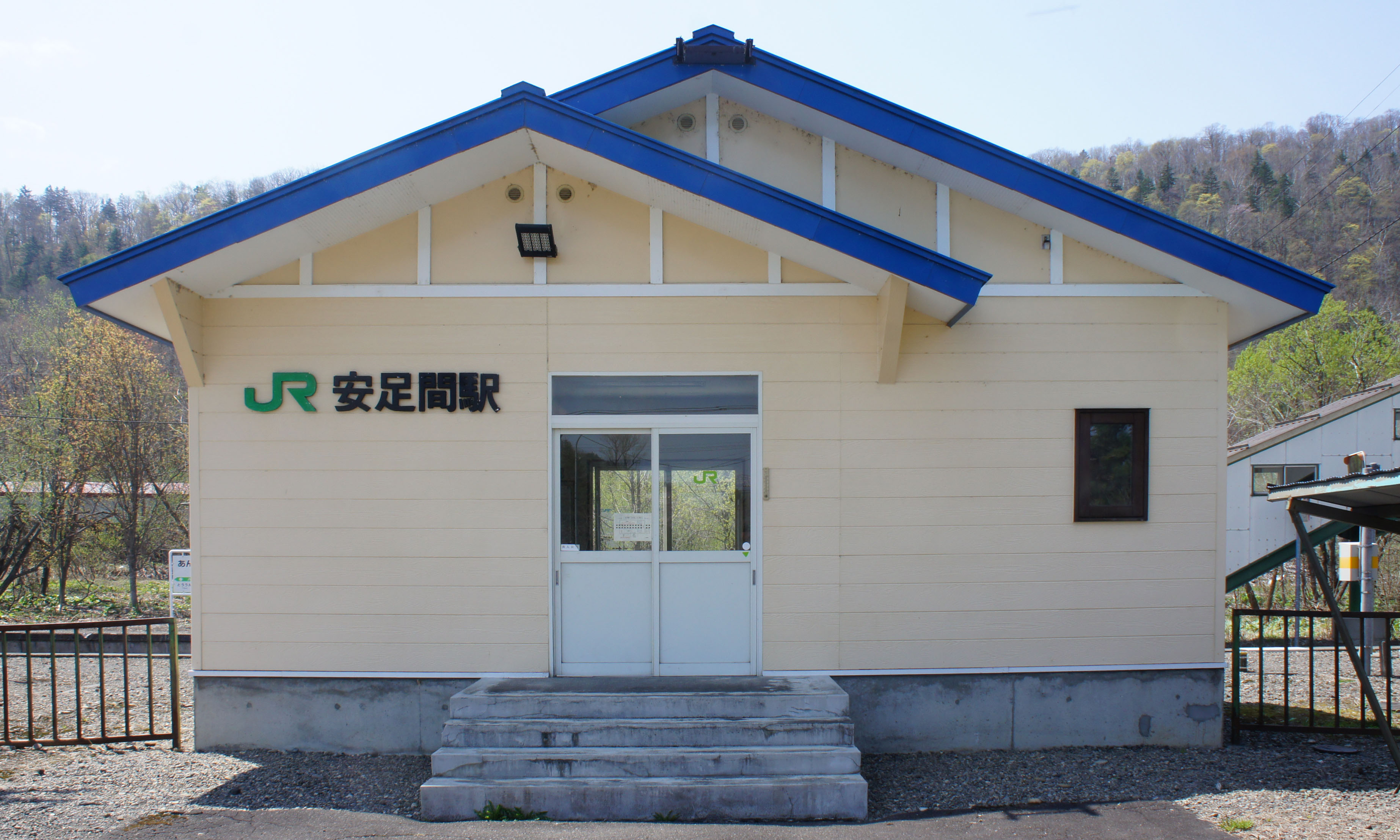
- Station Building

General information
- Location: Aizan, Aibetsu-cho, Kamikawa^gun, Hokkaido 078-1653; Japan
- Coordinates: 43.8517°N 142.6938°E
- System: regional rail
- Operator: JR Hokkaido
- Line: Sekihoku Main Line
- Distance: 38.0 km (23.6 mi) from Shin-Asahikawa
- Platforms: 2 side platforms
- Tracks: 2
- Train operators: JR Hokkaido

Construction
- Structure type: At grade
- Accessible: No

Other information
- Status: Unattended
- Station code: A41
- Website: Official website

History
- Opened: 15 November 1923

Passengers
- FY2019: 4

Services
Preceding station	JR Hokkaido	Following station
Kamikawa towards Shin-Asahikawa	Sekihoku Main Line Local	Naka-Aibetsu towards Abashiri
Location
- Location within Hokkaido Location within Japan

Antaroma Station (安足間駅, Antaroma-eki) is a railway station in the town of Aibetsu, Kamikawa, Hokkaidō, Japan. It is operated by JR Hokkaido. Its station number is A41.

== Lines ==
The station is served by the 234.0 km (145.4 mi) Sekihoku Main Line from Asahikawa to Abashiri and is located 38.0 km from the starting point of the line at Shin-Asahikawa.

== Layout ==
The station is an above-ground station with two side platforms connected by a footbridge. The station is unattended.

=== Platforms ===
1	■ Sekihoku Main Line	for Asahikawa
2	■ Sekihoku Main Line	for Kamikawa

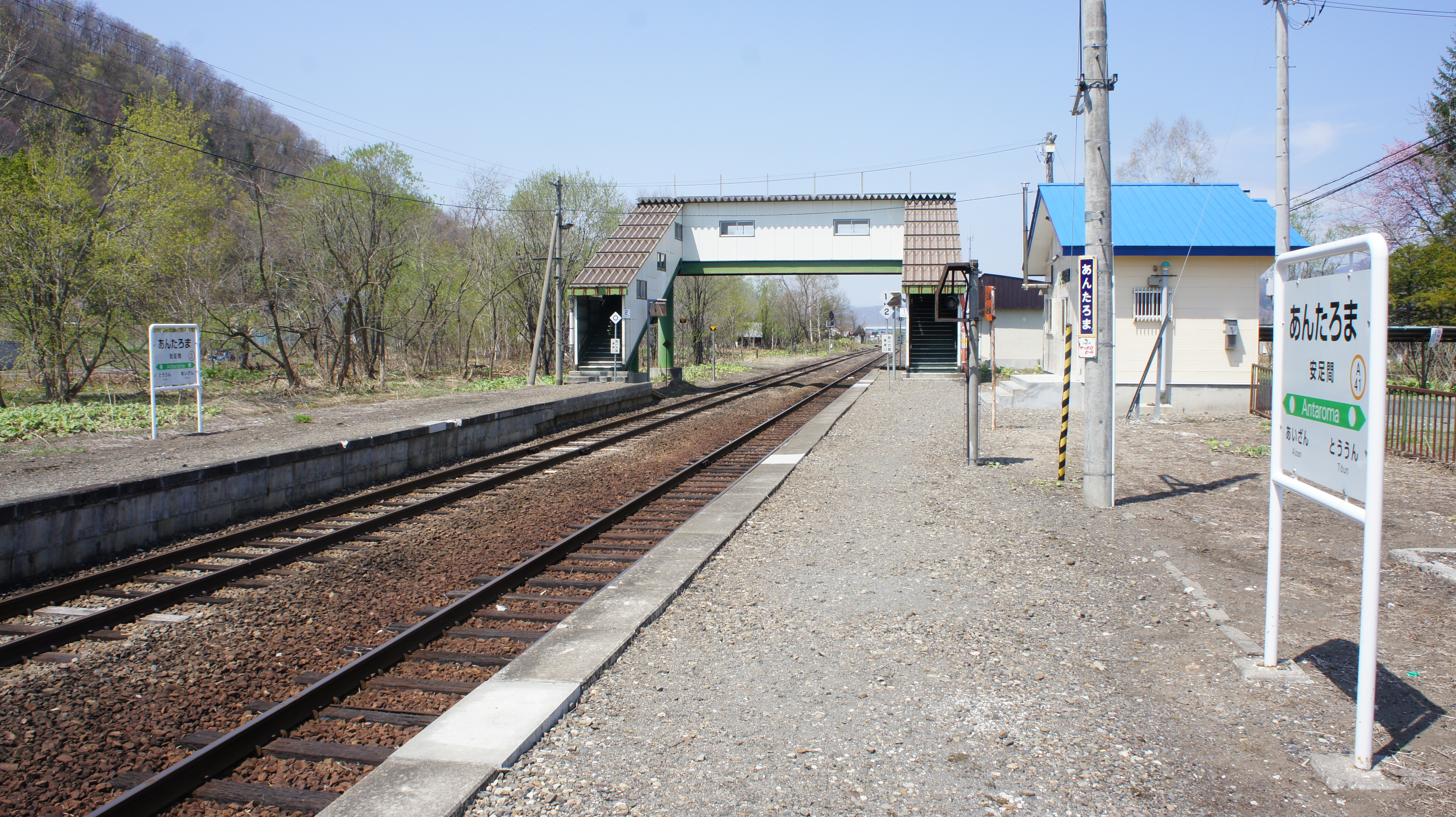
Platform

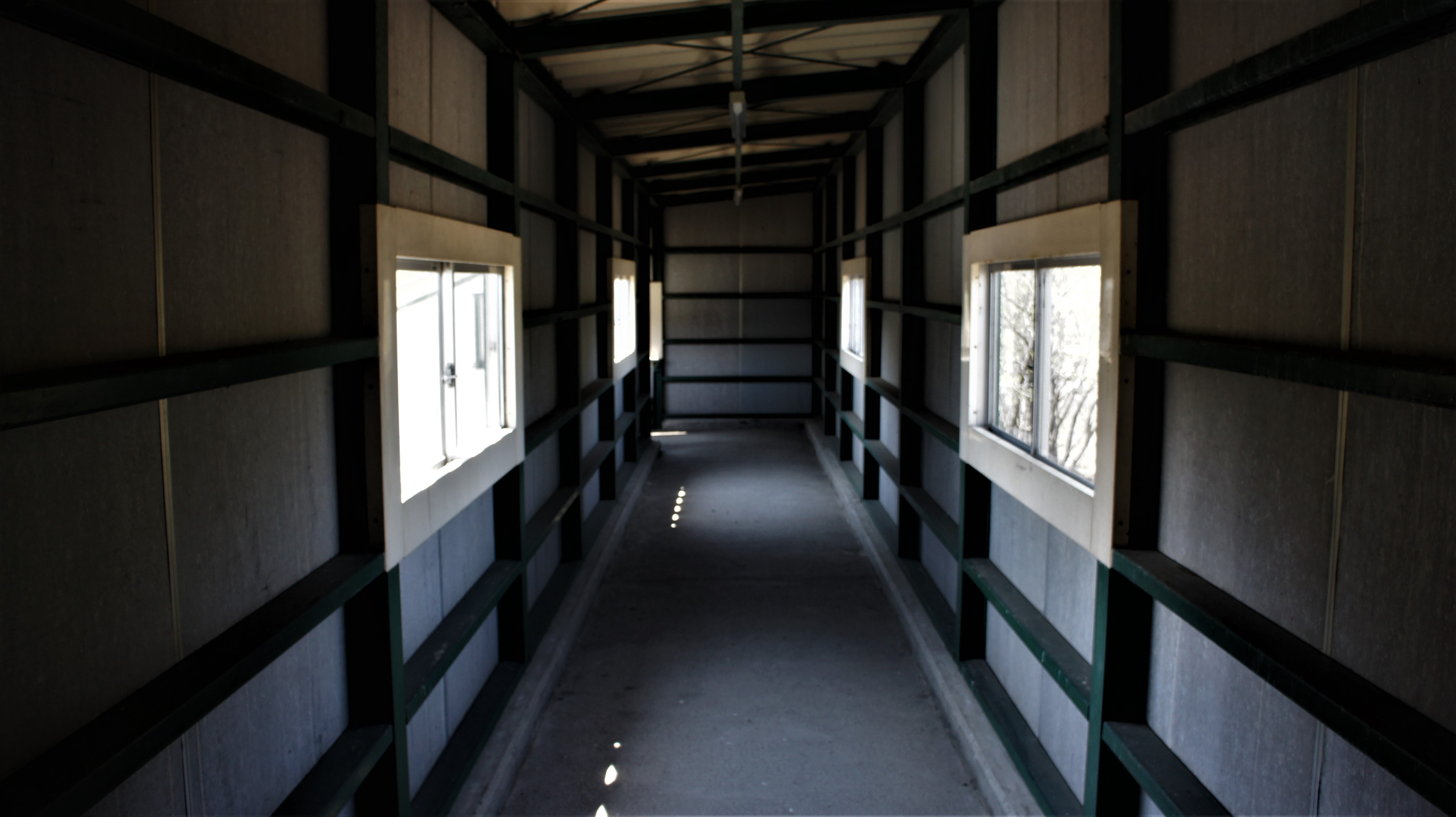
Footbridge

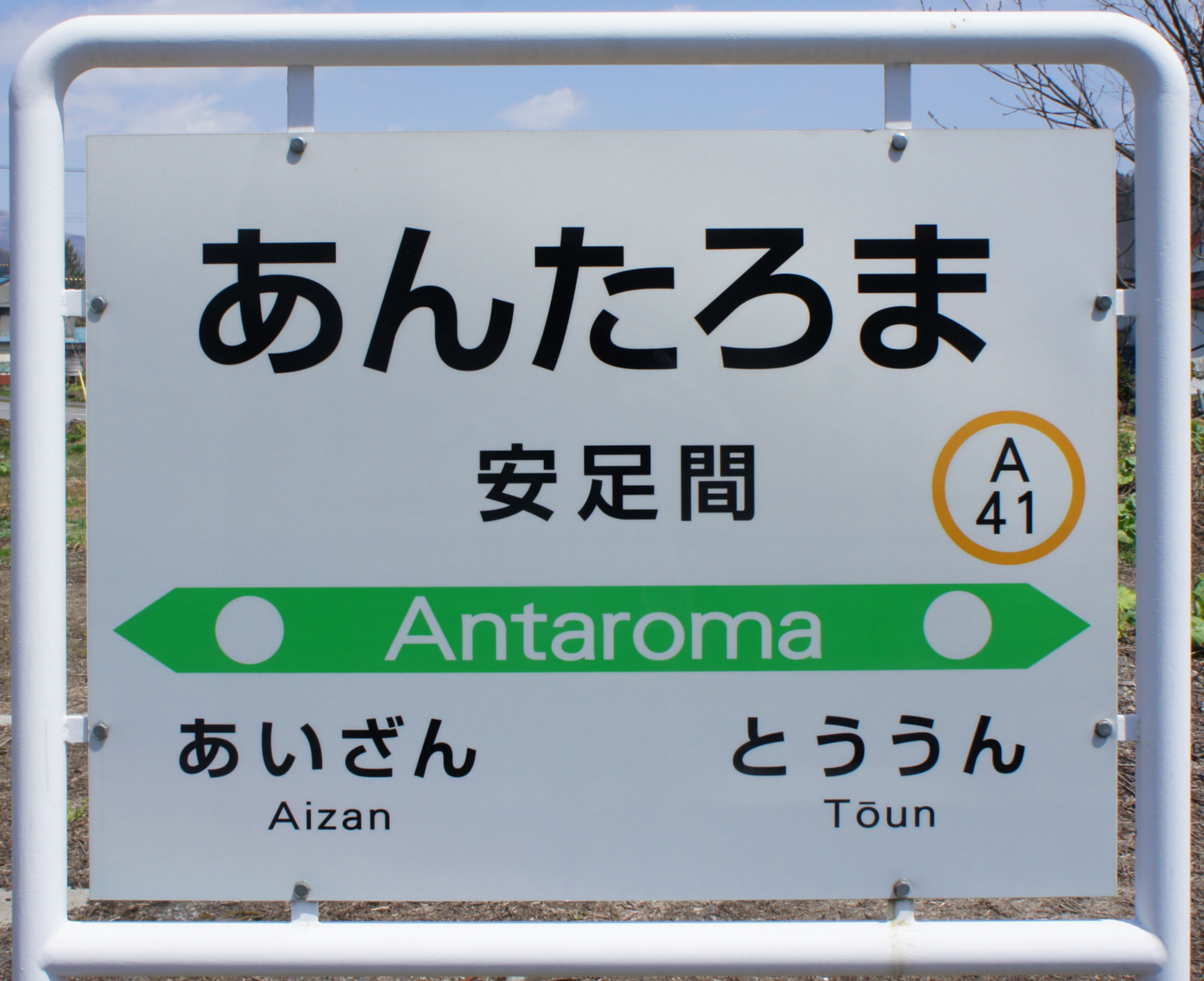
Sign Board

== History ==
The station was opened as on 15 November 1923 with the extension of the Hokkaido Government Railway Sekihoku Line between Aibetsu Station and Kamikawa Station. With the privatization of Japanese National Railways (JNR) on 1 April 1987, the station came under the control of JR Hokkaido. The station building was rebuilt in 1988.

== Passenger statistics ==
During fiscal 2019, the station was used on average by 4 passengers daily.

== Surrounding area ==
- Japan National Route 39

== See also ==
- List of railway stations in Japan
