= Asahikawa-Yojō Station =

Railway station in Asahikawa, Hokkaido, Japan

A29 Asahikawa-Yojō Station 旭川四条駅
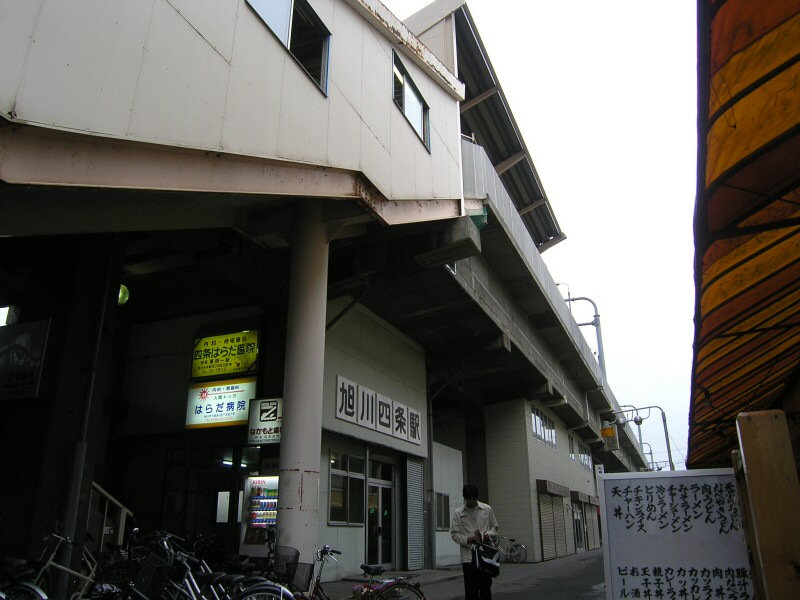

General information
- Location: 4-Jōdōri 18-chōme, Asahikawa, Hokkaidō; Japan
- Coordinates: 43.76406°N 142.37592°E
- Operator: JR Hokkaidō
- Lines: Sōya Main Line; Sekihoku Main Line

Construction
- Accessible: Yes

History
- Opened: 1 February 1957; 69 years ago
Location

Asahikawa-Yojō Station (旭川四条駅, Asahikawa-Yojō eki) is a railway station located in 4-Jōdōri 18-chōme, Asahikawa, Hokkaidō, on the Sōya Main Line, and is operated by the Hokkaido Railway Company (JR Hokkaidō).

== Lines ==
- JR Hokkaidō
  - Sōya Main Line
  - Sekihoku Main Line (the starting point is at Shin-Asahikawa Station, but all local trains originate and terminate at Asahikawa Station.)

== Adjacent stations ==
«	Service	»
Sōya Main Line
Limited express Sōya: Does not stop at this station
Limited express Sarobetsu: Does not stop at this station
Asahikawa	Rapid Nayoro	Nagayama
Asahikawa	Local	Shin-Asahikawa
Sekihoku Main Line
Limited express Okhotsk: Does not stop at this station
Limited express Taisetsu: Does not stop at this station
Asahikawa	Limited rapid Kitami (Kitami-bound only)	Shin-Asahikawa
Asahikawa	Local	Shin-Asahikawa
