= Tōma Station =

Railway station in Tōma, Hokkaido, Japan

Coordinates: 43.8255°N 142.5168°E

Tōma Station 当麻駅
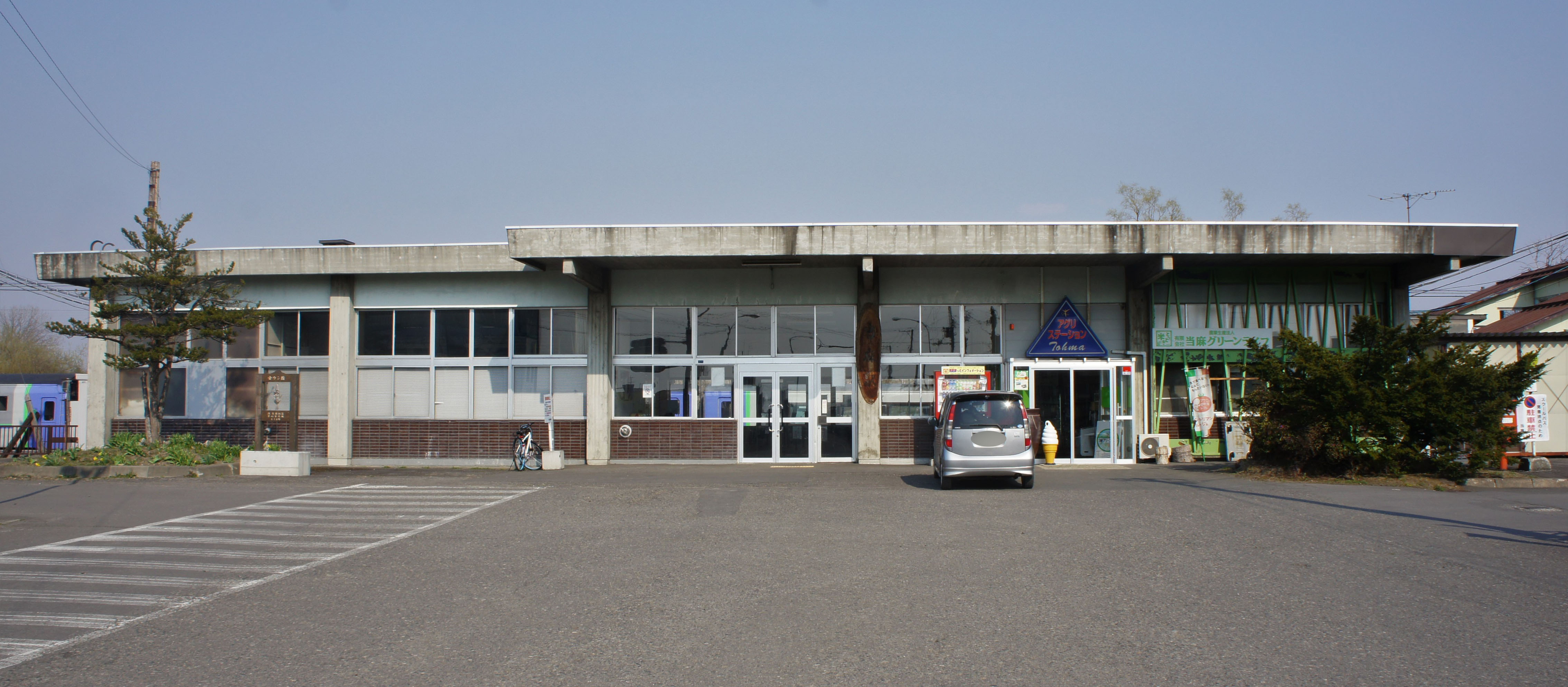

General information
- Location: Kamikawa, Hokkaido; Japan
- Operator: Hokkaido Railway Company
- Line: Sekihoku Main Line

Other information
- Station code: A35

History
- Opened: 1922
Location

Tōma Station (当麻駅, Tōma-eki) is a railway station in Tōma, Kamikawa, Hokkaidō Prefecture, Japan. Its station number is A35.

== Lines ==
- Hokkaido Railway Company

- Sekihoku Main Line

== History ==
Tōma Station opened on 4 November 1922.

With the privatization of the Japan National Railway (JNR) on 1 April 1987, the station came under the aegis of the Hokkaido Railway Company (JR Hokkaido).

== Adjacent stations ==
«	Service	»
Sekihoku Main Line
Asahikawa	Limited Rapid Kitami	Kamikawa
Sakuraoka	Local	Ikaushi
Limited Express Okhotsk: Does not stop at this station
Limited Express Taisetsu: Does not stop at this station
