= Kamikawa Station =

Railway station in Kamikawa, Hokkaido, Japan

Coordinates: 43.8485°N 142.7669°E

Kamikawa Station 上川駅
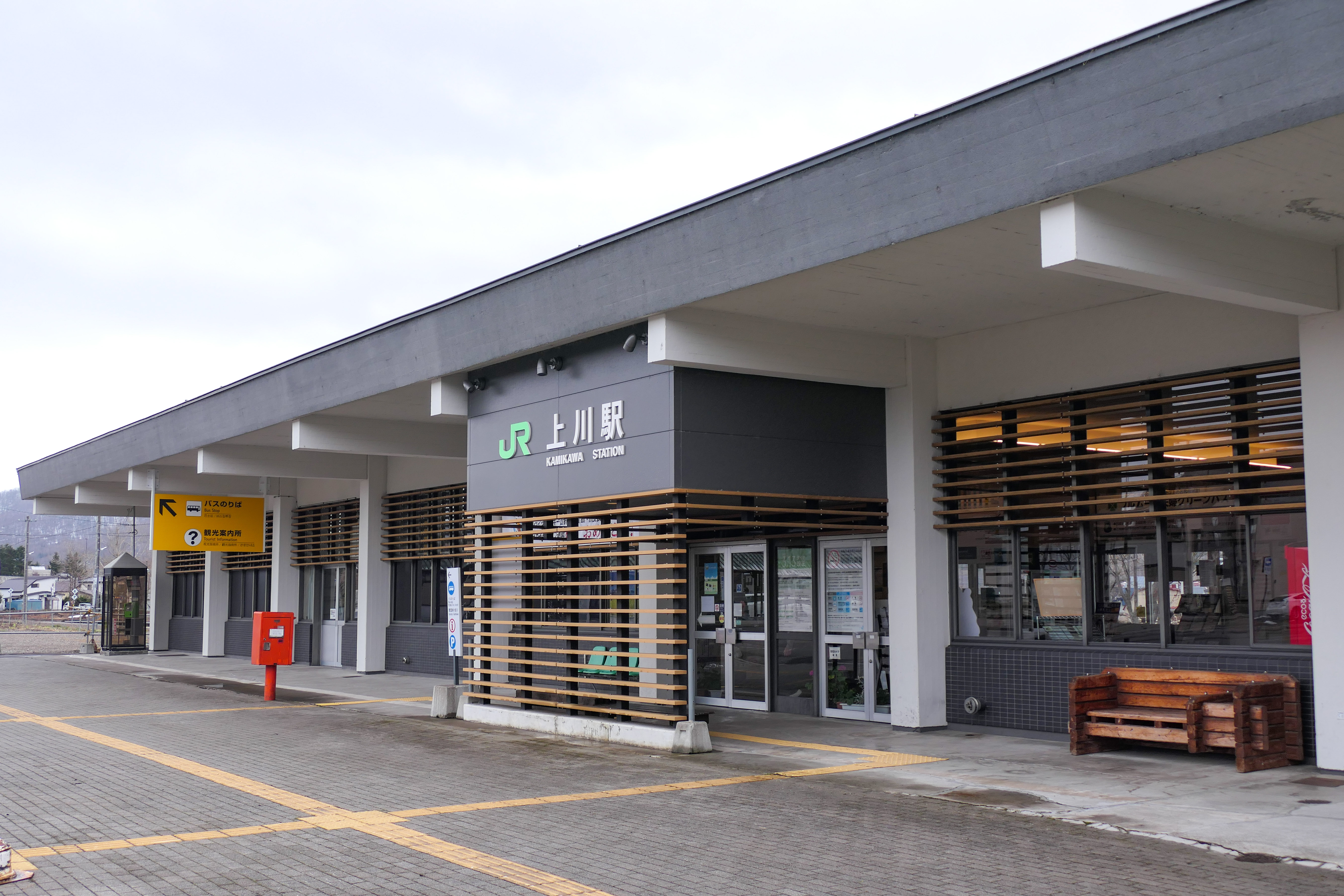

General information
- Location: Kamikawa, Hokkaido; Japan
- Operator: Hokkaido Railway Company
- Line: Sekihoku Main Line

Other information
- Station code: A43

History
- Opened: 1923

Passengers
- FY2023: 162 (daily)
Location

Kamikawa Station (上川駅, Kamikawa-eki) is a railway station in Kamikawa, Kamikawa, Hokkaidō Prefecture, Japan. Its station number is A43.

After Kami-Shirataki Station ceased operation in 2016, Shirataki Station as adjacent station from this station with distance of 37.3 km, make longest distance between any stations on JR ordinary lines (not include shared tracks with shinkansen).

== Lines ==
- Hokkaido Railway Company

- Sekihoku Main Line

== Adjacent stations ==
«	Service	»
Sekihoku Main Line
Asahikawa	Limited Express Okhotsk	Shirataki
Asahikawa	Limited Express Taisetsu	Shirataki or Maruseppu
Tōma	Limited Rapid Kitami	Shirataki
Antaroma	Local	Shirataki
