= Itoshino Station =

Railway station in Kitami, Hokkaido, Japan

Itoshino Station 愛し野駅
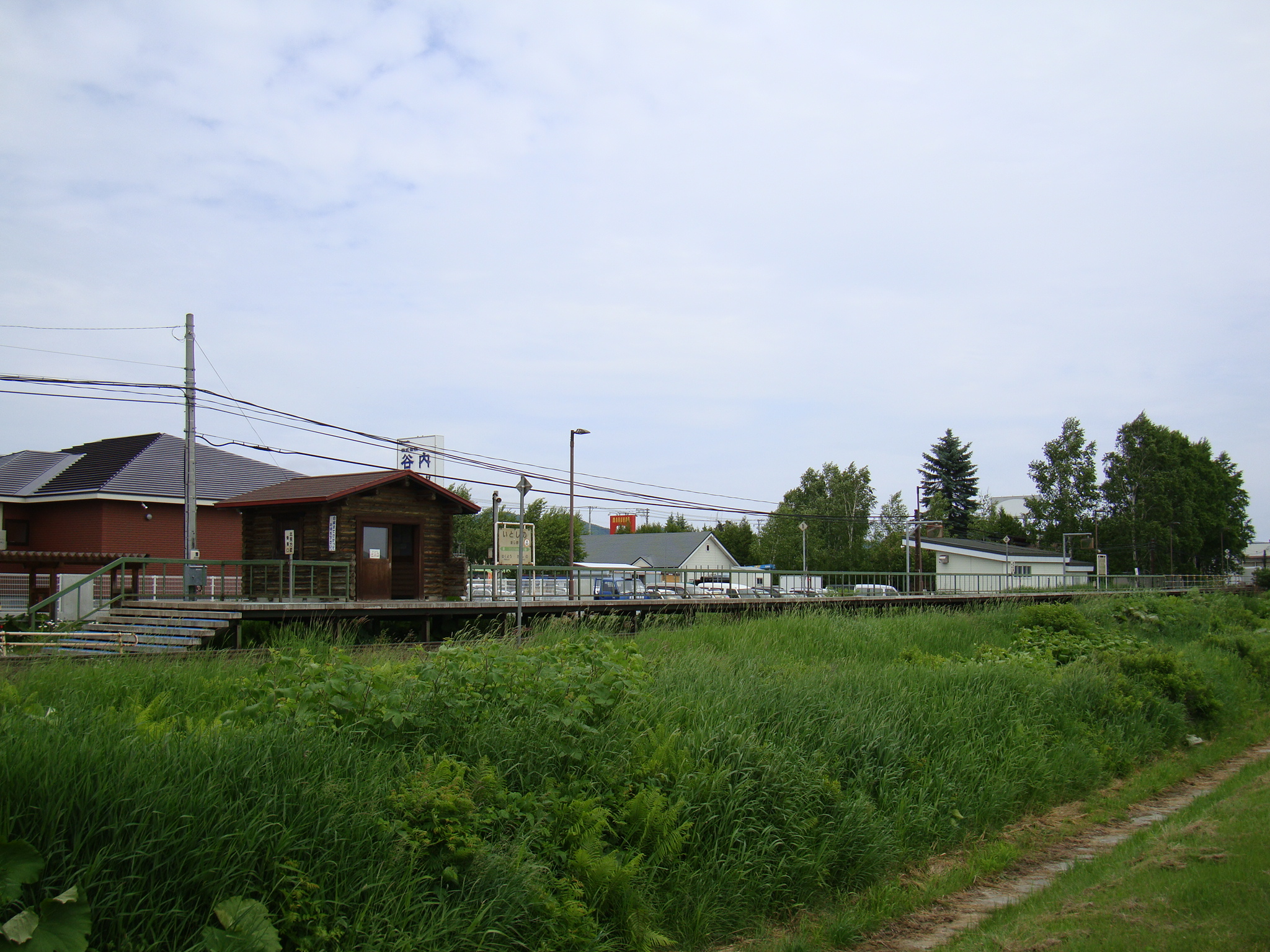
- Itoshino Station

General information
- Location: Tanno-machi, Kitami, Hokkaido （北海道北見市端野町） Japan
- Coordinates: 43°50′27.8″N 143°55′56.7″E
- Operator: JR Hokkaido
- Line: Sekihoku Main Line

Other information
- Station code: A62

History
- Opened: 1986
Location

Itoshino Station (愛し野駅, Itoshino-eki) is a railway station located in the third ward of Tanno, a suburb of Kitami city in Hokkaidō, Japan, and services the Sekihoku Main Line operated by JR Hokkaidō.

== Station structure ==
The station is above ground, and consists of a single platform alongside the railway track. Trains operate in both directions along the line. The waiting room is constructed in the style of a small log cabin. The station itself is mostly used by students attending the nearby senior high school.

== Station environs ==
As suburbanisation advances, residential area, agricultural land and shops and businesses exist in balance. In front of the station is a site for construction materials, and a large quantity of prefabricated buildings will be constructed.

== History ==
- November 1, 1986: The station opened as a temporary platform.
- April 1, 1987: Since the privatisation of the national rail network, the station status was upgraded and ownership was transferred to JR Hokkaidō.
