= Shin-Asahikawa Station =

Railway station in Asahikawa, Hokkaido, Japan

Coordinates: 43°46′49″N 142°23′05″E

A30 Shin-Asahikawa Station 新旭川駅
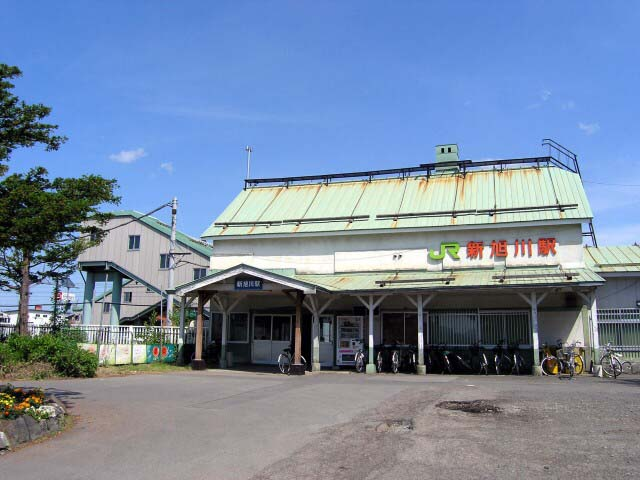
- Shin-Asahikawa

General information
- Location: Higashi-8-Jō 6-chōme, Asahikawa, Hokkaido （北海道旭川市東8条6丁目） Japan
- Operator: JR Hokkaido
- Lines: Sekihoku Main Line, Soya Main Line

Other information
- Station code: A30

History
- Opened: 4 November 1922; 103 years ago
Location

Shin-Asahikawa Station (新旭川駅, Shin-Asahikawa eki) is a railway station located in Asahikawa, Hokkaido, Japan, operated by the Hokkaido Railway Company (JR Hokkaido).

== Lines ==
Shin-Asahikawa Station is served by the Soya Main Line and is also the official starting point of the Sekihoku Main Line, although all local trains originate and terminate at Asahikawa Station.

== Adjacent stations ==
«	Service	»
Soya Main Line
Rapid Nayoro: Does not stop at this station
Limited Express Sōya: Does not stop at this station
Limited Express Sarobetsu: Does not stop at this station
Asahikawa-Yojō	Local	Nagayama
Sekihoku Main Line
Asahikawa-Yojo	Local	Minami-Nagayama
Asahikawa-Yojō	Limited Rapid Kitami (Kitami-bound only)	Minami-Nagayama
Limited Express Okhotsk: Does not stop at this station
Limited Express Taisetsu: Does not stop at this station

== History ==
The station opened on 4 November 1922. With the privatization of Japanese National Railways (JNR) on 1 April 1987, the station came under the control of JR Hokkaido.

== See also ==
- List of railway stations in Japan
