= Ikuno Station (Hokkaido) =

Railway station in Engaru, Hokkaido, Japan

Coordinates: 43°57′36″N 143°31′58″E

Ikuno Station 生野駅
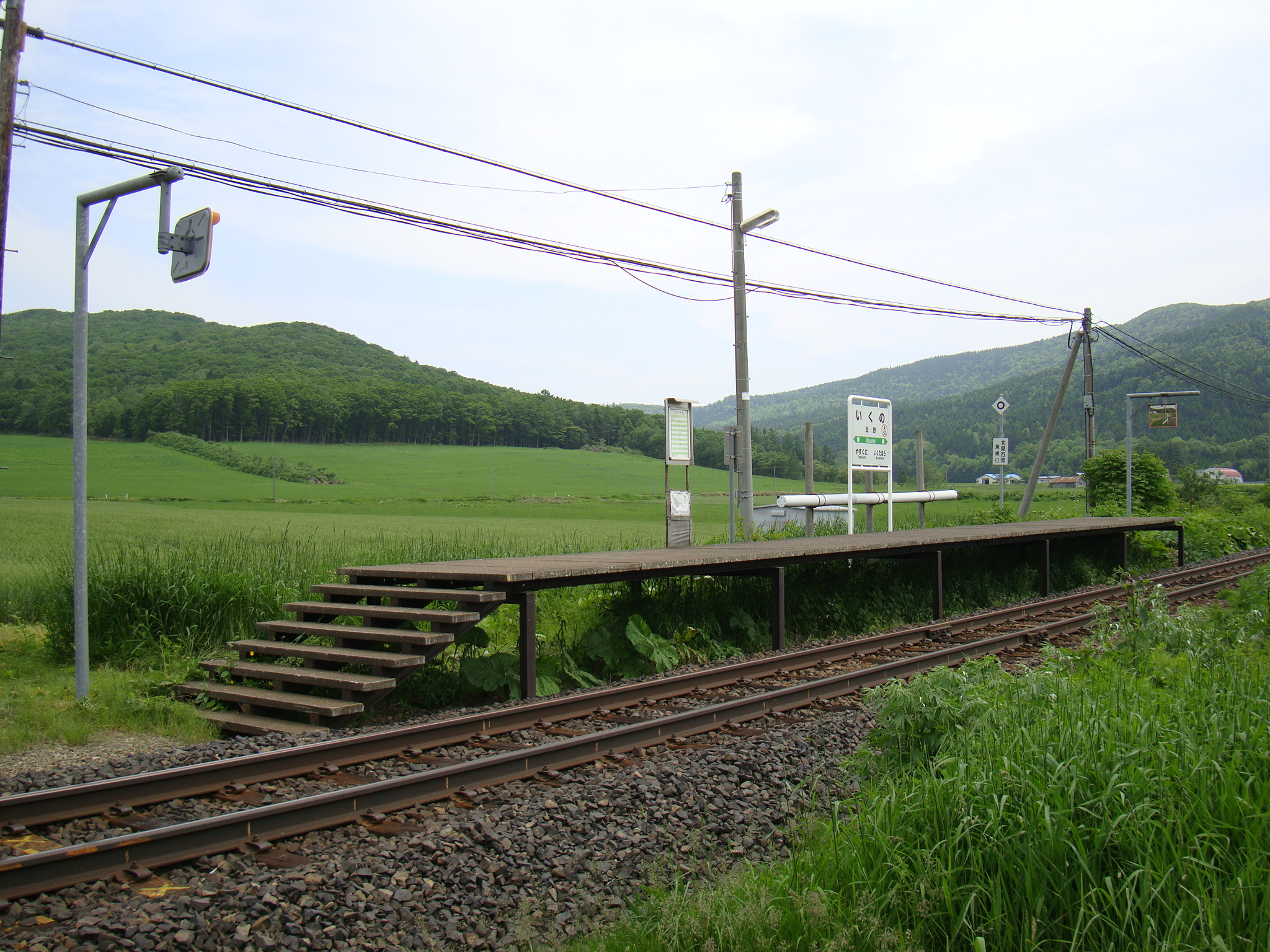
- Station Platform in 2009

General information
- Location: Ikutahara, Engaru, Monbetsu, Hokkaido; Japan
- Operator: Hokkaido Railway Company
- Line: Sekihoku Main Line
- Platforms: 1 side Platform

Other information
- Status: Unstaffed
- Station code: A52

History
- Opened: 1946
- Closed: 13 March 2021

Passengers
- 2011: 2 daily
Location

Ikuno Station (生野駅, Ikuno-eki) was a railway station in Engaru, Monbetsu, Hokkaido Prefecture, Japan. Its station number is A52.

== Lines ==
- Hokkaido Railway Company

- Sekihoku Main Line

== Adjacent stations ==
«	Service	»
Sekihoku Main Line
Limited Rapid Kitami: Does not stop at this station
Limited Express Okhotsk: Does not stop at this station
Limited Express Taisetsu: Does not stop at this station
Yasukuni	Local	Ikutahara
