= Nishi-Kitami Station =

Railway station in Kitami, Hokkaido, Japan

Coordinates: 43.8032°N 143.8415°E

Nishi-Kitami Station 西北見駅
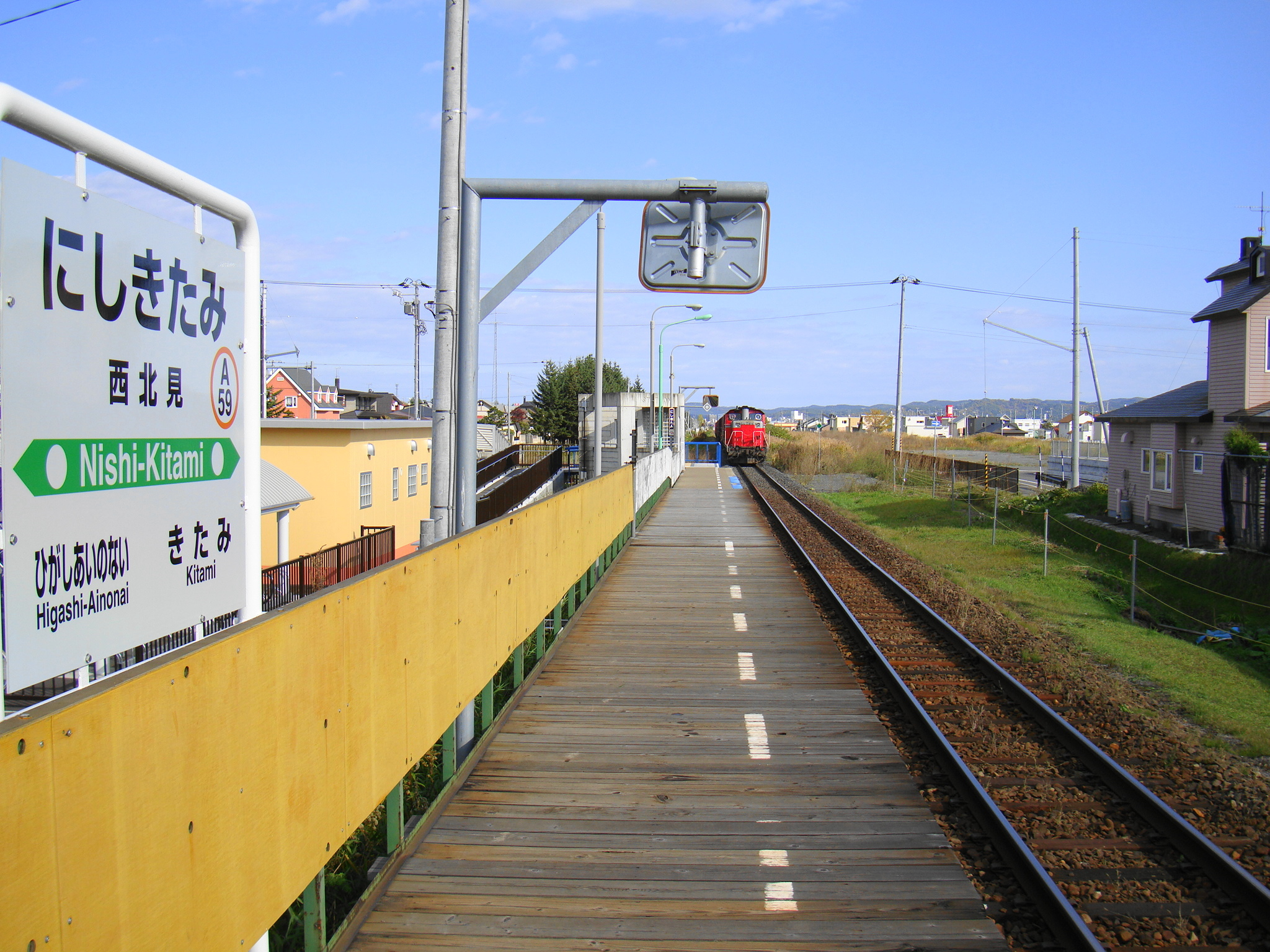
- Platform

General information
- Location: Kitami, Hokkaido （北海道北見市） Japan
- Operator: JR Hokkaido
- Line: Sekihoku Main Line

Other information
- Station code: A59

History
- Opened: 1986
Location

Nishi-Kitami Station (西北見駅, Nishi-Kitami-eki) is a railway station in Kitami, Hokkaidō Prefecture, Japan. Its station number is A59.

== Layout ==
Nishi-Kitami Station has a ground side platform serving bi-directional traffic.

== Adjacent stations ==
«	Service	»
Sekihoku Main Line
Higashi-Ainonai	Limited Rapid Kitami	Kitami
Higashi-Ainonai	Local	Kitami
Limited Express Okhotsk: Does not stop at this station
Limited Express Taisetsu: Does not stop at this station
