= Taisetsu =

Railway service in Hokkaido, Japan

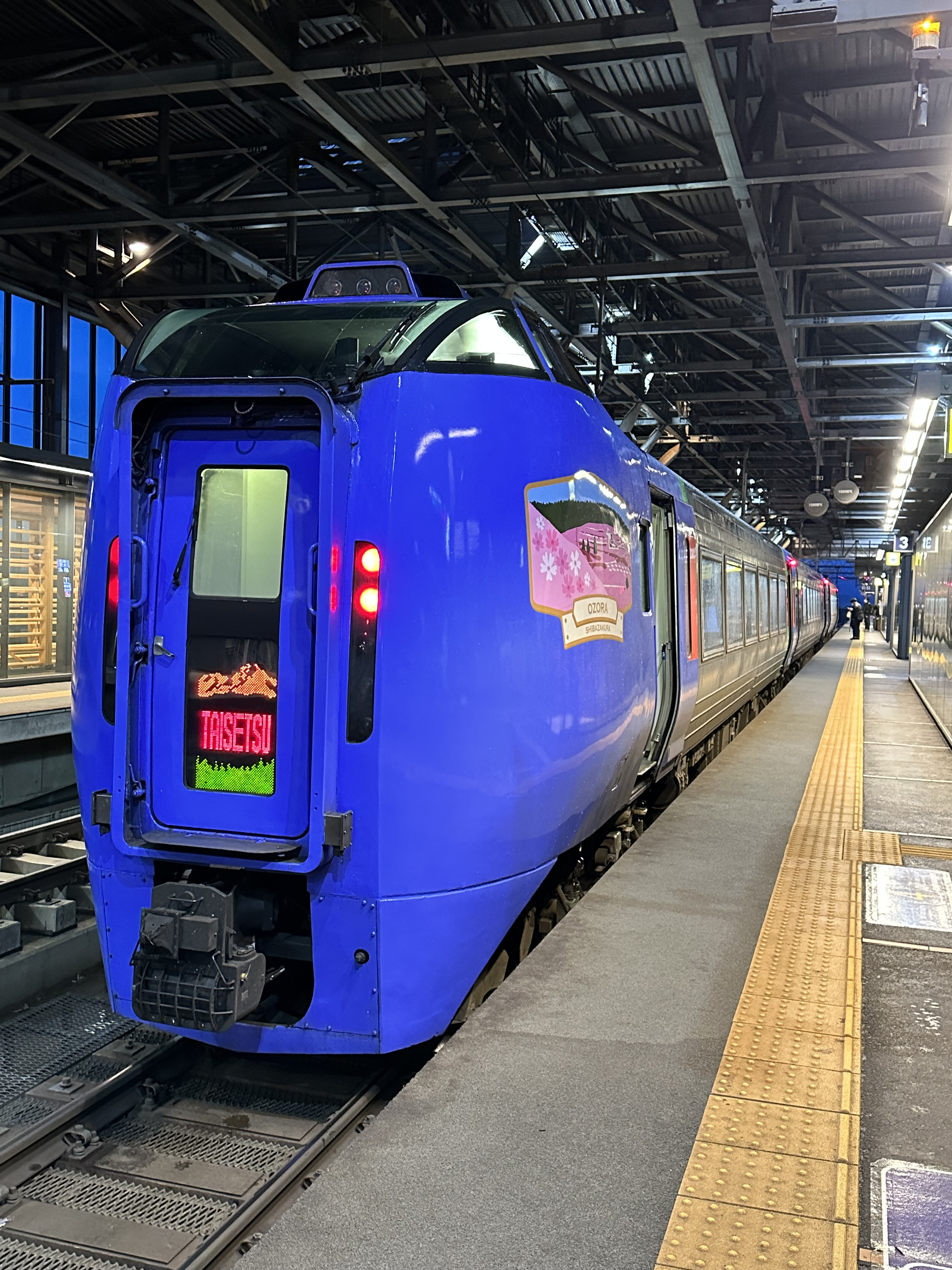
- KiHa 283 series DMU operating Limited Express Taisetsu service at Asahikawa Station in October 2023

Overview
- Service type: Special Rapid
- Status: Operational
- Locale: Japan
- Predecessor: Okhotsk
- First service: 29 June 1947 (Express); 4 March 2017 (Limited Express); 15 March 2025 (Special Rapid)
- Current operator(s): JR Hokkaido
- Former operator(s): JNR

Route
- Termini: Asahikawa; Abashiri
- Stops: 11
- Distance travelled: 237.7 km (147.7 mi)
- Average journey time: 3 hours 45 minutes approx
- Service frequency: 2 return services daily
- Line(s) used: Sekihoku Main Line

On-board services
- Class(es): Non-Reserved
- Disabled access: Yes
- Sleeping arrangements: None
- Catering facilities: None
- Observation facilities: None
- Entertainment facilities: None
- Other facilities: Toilets

Technical
- Rolling stock: H100 series DEMUs
- Track gauge: 1,067 mm (3 ft 6 in)
- Electrification: None
- Operating speed: 95 km/h (59 mph)
- Track owner(s): JR Hokkaido

The Taisetsu (大雪) is a special rapid service operated by Hokkaido Railway Company (JR Hokkaido) between Asahikawa and Abashiri in Hokkaido via the Sekihoku Main Line since 15 March 2025. The service was formerly classified as a limited express train from 4 March 2017 until 14 March 2025. The Taisetsu name was also formerly used for express services operated by Japanese National Railways (JNR) and later by JR Hokkaido from June 1947 until March 1992.

== Service outline ==
As of March 2017, two return services operate daily between Asahikawa and Abashiri on the Sekihoku Main Line, supplementing the Okhotsk limited express services operating between Sapporo and Abashiri.

== Stops ==
Trains stop at the following stations:

Asahikawa - Kamikawa - (Shirataki) - (Maruseppu) - Engaru - Ikutahara - Rubeshibe - Kitami - Bihoro - Memanbetsu - Abashiri

== Rolling stock ==
As of 15 March 2025, Taisetsu services are normally formed of H100 series diesel-electric multiple units (DEMU) railcars, with monoclass non-reserved seats.

=== Former ===
Until 17 March 2023, services were formed of 4-car KiHa 183 series diesel multiple unit (DMU) trains as shown below. All cars were no-smoking.

Until the end of limited express services on 14 March 2025, 3-car KiHa 283 series diesel multiple unit (DMU) trains, with monoclass passenger accommodation.

Car No.	1	2		3		4
Accommodation	Non-reserved	Non-reserved	Reserved	Reserved	Green	Reserved
Facilities		Toilet		Toilet		

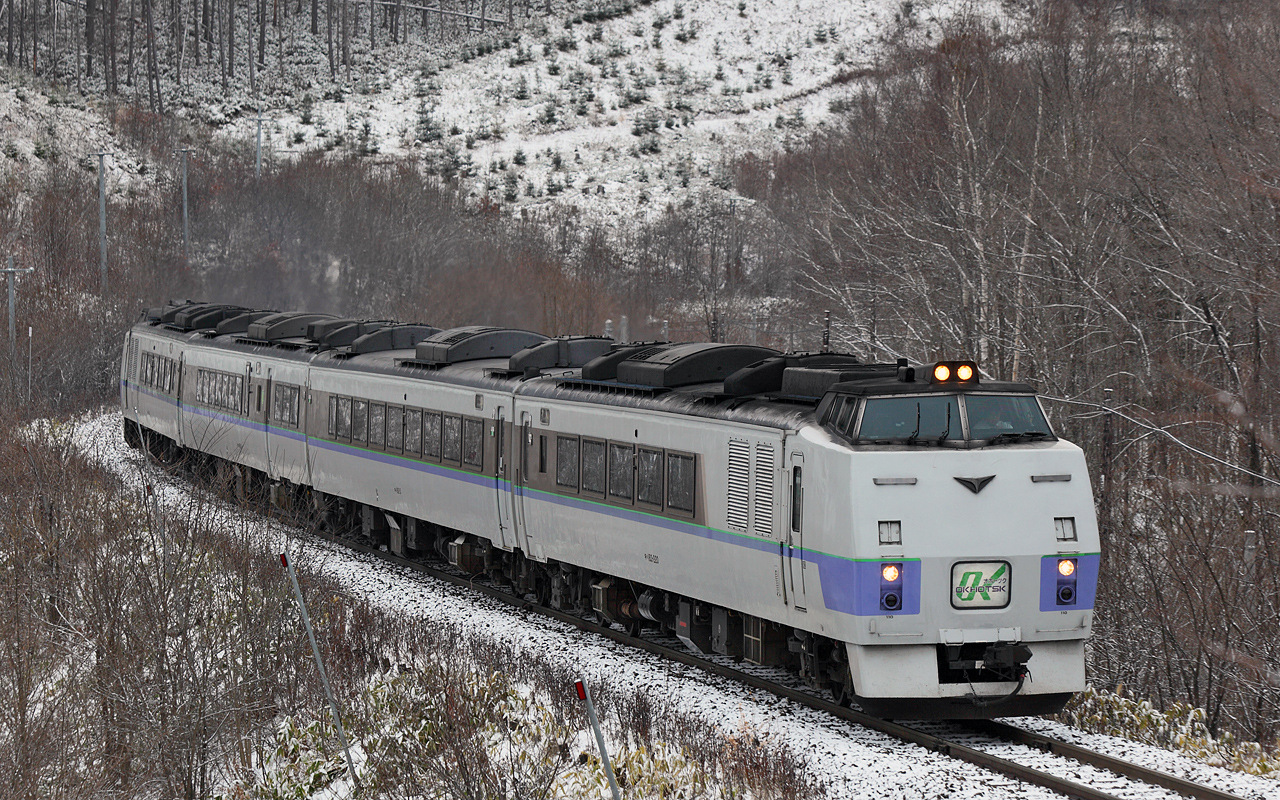
A KiHa 183 series four-car train on an Okhotsk service in 2009

== History ==
=== 1947–1963 ===
The train service that was later to become the Taisetsu was first introduced on 29 June 1947 as an unnamed steam-hauled express service operating between Hakodate and Asahikawa via Otaru and Sapporo. The train received the name Taisetsu from 1 April 1951.

This service ran until 31 May 1963, after which it was replaced by the Lilac service.

=== 1963–1992 ===
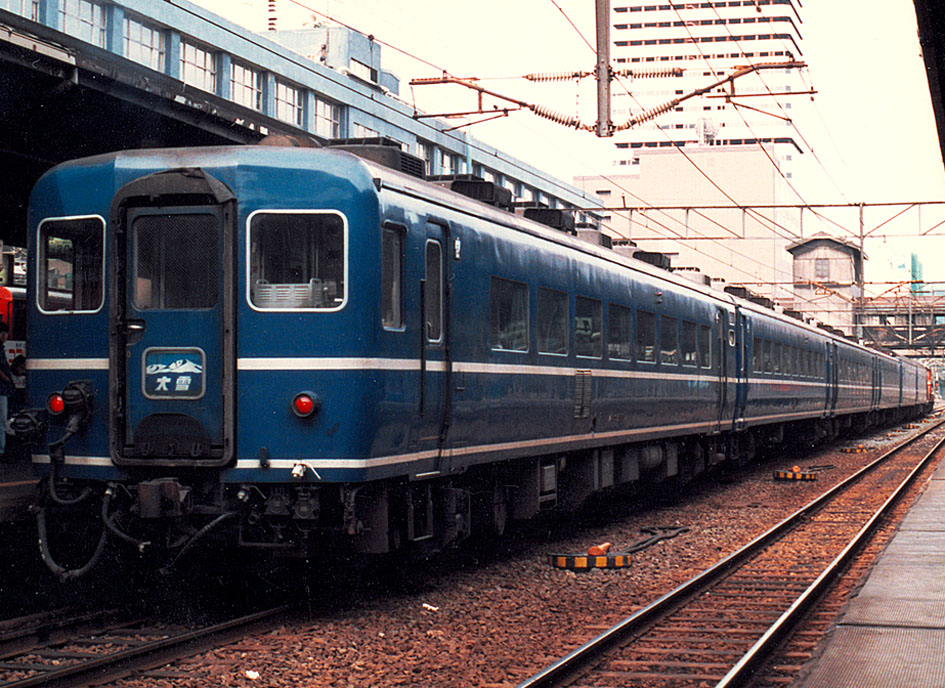
A Taisetsu overnight service in 1986

From 1 June 1963, the Taisetsu service operated as an express between Sapporo and Abashiri, via Asahikawa. This service was discontinued from the start of the revised timetable on 14 March 1992.

=== 2017– 2025 ===
The Taisetsu name was revived from 4 March 2017 as a limited express service operating between Asahikawa and Abashiri on the Sekihoku Main Line.
