= Ikuno Station =

Ikuno Station is the name of two train stations in Japan:

- Ikuno Station (Hokkaidō)
- Ikuno Station (Hyōgo)
