= Nayoro Main Line =

Defunct railway line in Hokkaido

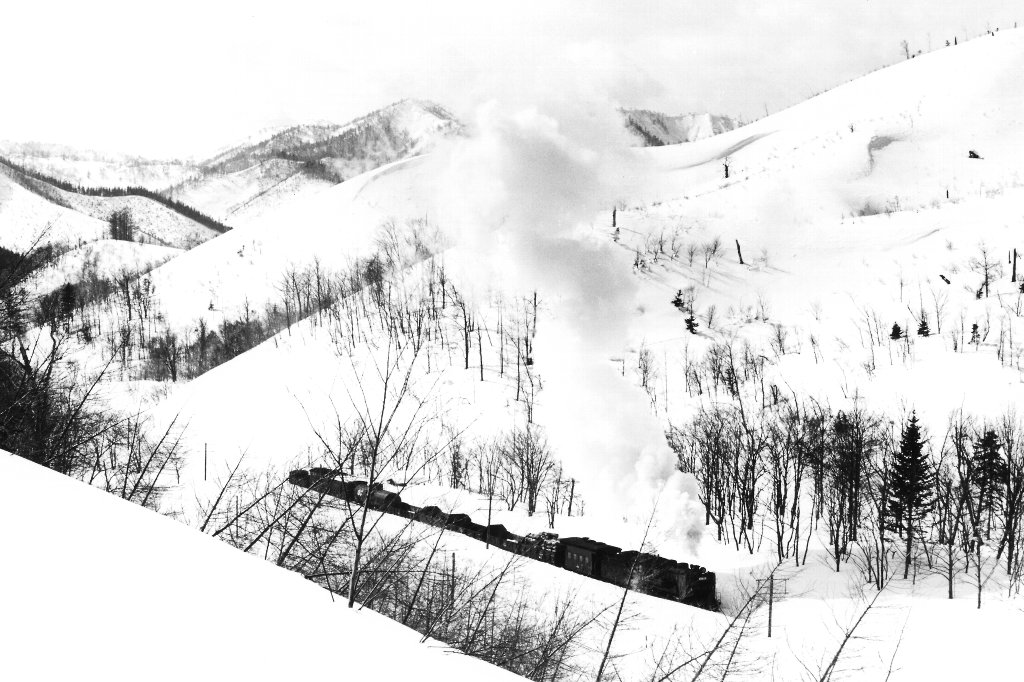
- A freight train driven by a Type 9600 steam engine in Tenpoku Pass, March 1973

Overview
- Status: Defunct
- Termini: Nayoro; Engaru
- Stations: 40

History
- Opened: November 1, 1915 (Yubetsu Line; as Yubetsu Light Rail Line); October 20, 1919 (Main Line; as Nayoro Line)
- Closed: May 1, 1989

Technical
- Line length: 138.1 km (85.8 mi)
- Track gauge: 1,067 mm (3 ft 6 in)
Route map

The Nayoro Main Line (名寄本線) was a rail line which was operated by Japanese National Railways and later under JR Hokkaido, which extended from Nayoro to Engaru, where it connected with the Sekihoku Main Line. It had a branch line known as the Yubetsu Line (湧別線) which ran between Naka-Yubetsu and Yubetsu, and was originally a light rail line before it was converted in 1916.

The line opened in 1919 as the Nayoro Line (名寄線), and was designated as a main line in 1923. It was designated as one of the specified local lines under the JNR Reconstruction Act, and the entire line was closed on May 1, 1989. The Nishi-Okoppe and Yubetsu stations are now the site of a hotel and fire station respectively.

== Services ==
In 1962, three services would start using the line - the Monbetsu, which ran between Sapporo and Engaru; the Asahikawa, which was a round trip service that made stops at Engaru and Nayoro before returning to Asahikawa; and the Tento, which ran between Okoppe and Abashiri.

== Stations ==
=== Main Line ===
Station		Distance (km)	Transfers	Location	
Nayoro	名寄駅	0.0	■ Sōya Main Line Shinmei Line (closed September 4, 1995)	Kamikawa Subprefecture	Nayoro
Naka-Nayoro	中名寄駅	5.8		Kamikawa Subprefecture	Nayoro
Kami-Nayoro	上名寄駅	9.7		Kamikawa Subprefecture	Kamikawa, Hokkaido
Yabumi	矢文駅	12.1		Kamikawa Subprefecture	Kamikawa, Hokkaido
Gifubashi	岐阜橋駅	13.8		Kamikawa Subprefecture	Kamikawa, Hokkaido
Shimokawa	下川駅	16.5		Kamikawa Subprefecture	Kamikawa, Hokkaido
Ninohashi	二ノ橋駅	21.4		Kamikawa Subprefecture	Kamikawa, Hokkaido
Kōsei	幸成駅	(25.0)		Kamikawa Subprefecture	Kamikawa, Hokkaido
Ichinohashi	一ノ橋駅	27.9		Kamikawa Subprefecture	Kamikawa, Hokkaido
Kami-Okoppe	上興部駅	38.9		Okhotsk Subprefecture	Monbetsu District, Hokkaido
Nishi-Okoppe	西興部駅	45.2		Okhotsk Subprefecture	Monbetsu District, Hokkaido
Rokkō	六興駅	(48.8)		Okhotsk Subprefecture	Monbetsu District, Hokkaido
Naka-Okoppe	中興部駅	52.2		Okhotsk Subprefecture	Monbetsu District, Hokkaido
Panke	班渓駅	(55.3)		Okhotsk Subprefecture	Monbetsu District, Hokkaido
Utsu	宇津駅	58.6		Okhotsk Subprefecture	Monbetsu District, Hokkaido
Hakkō	北興駅	64.3		Okhotsk Subprefecture	Monbetsu District, Hokkaido
Okoppe	興部駅	67.8	Kōhin South Line (closed July 15, 1985)	Okhotsk Subprefecture	Monbetsu District, Hokkaido
Asahigaoka	旭ヶ丘駅	(69.1)		Okhotsk Subprefecture	Monbetsu District, Hokkaido
Toyono	豊野駅	73.0		Okhotsk Subprefecture	Monbetsu District, Hokkaido
Saruru	沙留駅	77.7		Okhotsk Subprefecture	Monbetsu District, Hokkaido
Tomioka	富丘駅	(81.4)		Okhotsk Subprefecture	Monbetsu District, Hokkaido
Shokotsu	渚滑駅	88.9	Shokotsu Line (closed April 1, 1985)	Okhotsk Subprefecture	Monbetsu City, Hokkaido
Shiomichō	潮見町駅	91.9		Okhotsk Subprefecture	Monbetsu City, Hokkaido
Monbetsu	紋別駅	93.1		Okhotsk Subprefecture	Monbetsu City, Hokkaido
Moto-Monbetsu	元紋別駅	97.7		Okhotsk Subprefecture	Monbetsu City, Hokkaido
Ipponmatsu	一本松駅	(102.6)		Okhotsk Subprefecture	Monbetsu City, Hokkaido
Komukai	小向駅	105.9		Okhotsk Subprefecture	Monbetsu City, Hokkaido
Kōdō	弘道駅	(108.2)		Okhotsk Subprefecture	Monbetsu City, Hokkaido
Numanoue	沼ノ上駅	112.6		Okhotsk Subprefecture	Monbetsu City, Hokkaido
Asahi	旭駅	117.2		Okhotsk Subprefecture	Monbetsu District, Hokkaido
Kawanishi	川西駅	119.3		Okhotsk Subprefecture	Monbetsu District, Hokkaido
Naka-Yubetsu	中湧別駅	121.9	Yubetsu Line Yūmō Line (closed March 20, 1987)	Okhotsk Subprefecture	Monbetsu District, Hokkaido
Hokuyū	北湧駅	(125.0)		Okhotsk Subprefecture	Monbetsu District, Hokkaido
Kami-Yubetsu	上湧別駅	126.5		Okhotsk Subprefecture	Monbetsu District, Hokkaido
Kyōshin	共進駅	129.7		Okhotsk Subprefecture	Monbetsu District, Hokkaido
Kaisei	開盛駅	133.6		Okhotsk Subprefecture	Monbetsu District, Hokkaido
Kita-Engaru	北遠軽駅	135.4		Okhotsk Subprefecture	Monbetsu District, Hokkaido
Engaru	遠軽駅	138.1	■ Sekihoku Main Line	Okhotsk Subprefecture	Monbetsu District, Hokkaido

=== Yubetsu Line ===
Station		Distance (km)	Transfers	Location		
Naka-Yubetsu	中湧別駅	0.0	Nayoro Main Line Yūmō Line	Okhotsk Subprefecture	Monbetsu District, Hokkaido	Kamiyūbetsu, Hokkaido
Shigōsen	四号線駅	(3.0)		Okhotsk Subprefecture	Monbetsu District, Hokkaido	Monbetsu, Hokkaido
Yubetsu	湧別駅	4.9		Okhotsk Subprefecture	Monbetsu District, Hokkaido	Monbetsu, Hokkaido

== History ==
In 1915, the Yubetsu Light Rail Line was extended from Nokkeushi (which was renamed to Kitami in 1942) to Shanabuchi (later Kaisei). The light railroad lines of the national railroads were built with the same gauge of 1067mm as the other lines, but only the Yubetsu Light Rail Line had a gauge of 762mm. In the following year, the gauge was changed to 1067mm.

The section of the line from Nayoro to Naka-Yubetsu, on the other hand, was constructed from both sides as the Nayoro West Line and the Nayoro East Line to avoid the difficult Sekihoku and Kitami Passes, and the entire line was opened to traffic as the Nayoro Line between 1919 and 1921. In 1922, with the repeal of the Light Railways Act, the Yubetsu Light Rail Line was renamed to the Yubetsu Line, and in 1923, the Nayoro Line was designated as a main line, and was renamed to the Nayoro Main Line.

In 1932, after the Kitami Pass was overcome and the Sekihoku Line (later the Sekihoku Main Line) became fully operational, the section of the Yubetsu Line between Naka-Yubetsu and Nokkeushi would be transferred to other lines - the section between Engaru and Naka-Yubetsu became part of the Nayoro Main Line, whilst the section between Engaru and Nokkeushi became part of the Sekihoku Line.

=== Closure ===
When the National Railways Restructuring Act was passed in 1980, the line was designated as a specified local line, but its abolition was delayed along with that of the Tempoku, Chihoku, and Shibetsu lines due to insufficient alternative transportation at that time, especially in winter. However, in 1985, the approval was given for their abolition as the problem had been fixed.

After the privatization of Japan National Railways in April 1987, the towns of Engaru, Monbetsu, and Shimokawa along the line continued to campaign for the continuation of the line by subsidizing the use of the line by their residents. It was proposed that the sections of the line between Nayoro and Shimokawa and between Monbetsu and Engaru be transferred to third-sector operation, as these sections were used most frequently by passengers. However, the idea of continuing the line as a railroad was eventually abandoned, and the entire line was closed to passengers on April 30, 1989.

== Wikimedia links ==
Media related to Nayoro Main Line at Wikimedia Commons
