= Sunagawa =

Sunagawa 砂川市
- City
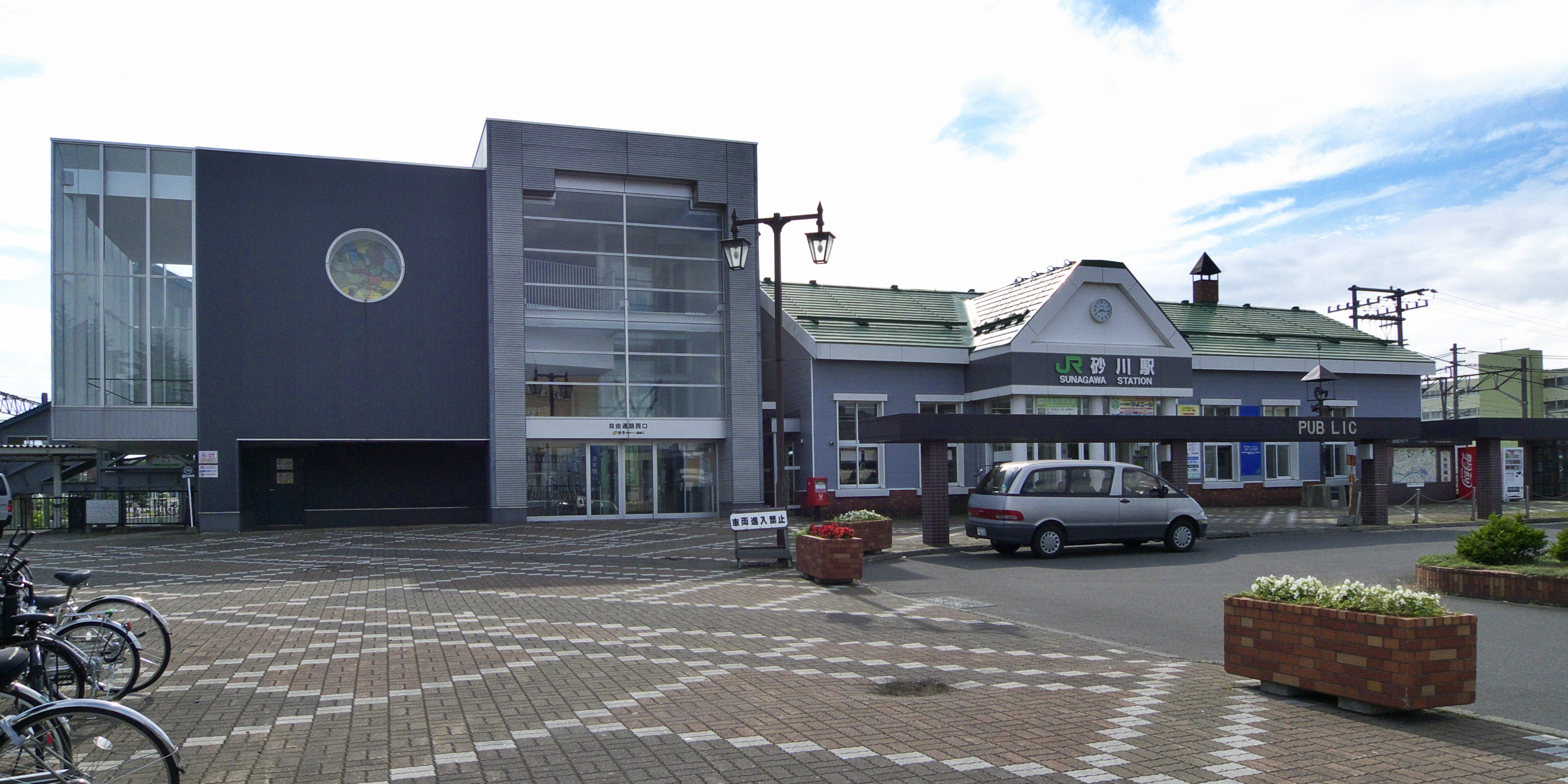
- Sunagawa Station

- Flag Seal

- Location of Sunagawa in Hokkaido (Sorachi Subprefecture)

- Location in Japan
- Coordinates: 43°29′8″N 141°54′44″E
- Country: Japan
- Region: Hokkaido
- Prefecture: Hokkaido (Sorachi Subprefecture)

Government
  - Mayor: Masafumi Yoshioka

Area
  - Total: 78.69 km^{2} (30.38 sq mi)

Population (August 15, 2024)
  - Total: 15,340
  - Density: 194.9/km^{2} (504.9/sq mi)
- Time zone: UTC+09:00 (JST)
- City hall address: 1-1 Kita San-chōme, Nishi Roku-jō, Sunagawa-shi, Hokkaido; 073-0195
- Website: www.city.sunagawa.hokkaido.jp
- Symbols
- Flower: Lily of the Valley
- Tree: Japanese Rowan

Sunagawa (砂川市, Sunagawa-shi) is a city located in Sorachi Subprefecture, Hokkaido, Japan.

== Population ==
As of August 2024, the city has an estimated population of 15,340 and a population density of 190 people per km^{2}. The total area is 78.69 km^{2}.

== Amenity town ==
The city was designated as the first "Amenity Town" in Hokkaido in 1984 (Showa 59). As an Amenity Town, Sunagawa contains lot of greenery, such as parks.

== Name ==
Name of Sunagawa is derived from an Ainu word "Ota-ushi-nai", meaning the river near sandy shore.

== History ==
- 1890 - Nae Village founded.
- 1895 - Nae Village Office opened.
- 1897 - Utashinai Village splits off .
- 1902 - Nae becomes a Second Class Municipality.
- 1903 - Nae Village becomes Sunagawa Village.
- 1907 - Sunagawa becomes a First Class Municipality.
- 1923 - Sunagawa Village becomes Sunagawa Town.
- 1944 - Naie Village splits off.
- 1949 - Kamisunagawa Town splits off.
- July 1, 1958 - Sunagawa Town becomes Sunagawa City.

== Education ==
=== High school ===
- Hokkaido Sunagawa High School.

== Transportation ==
- Hakodate Main Line : Toyonuma - Sunagawa
- Hokkaidō Expressway : Naie-Sunagawa IC (Naie) - Sunanaga SA - Takikawa IC (Takikawa)

== Notable people from Sunagawa, Hokkaido ==
- Mitsuya Nagai (born 1968), Japanese mixed martial artist, kickboxer and professional wrestler (Real Name: Hirokazu Nagai, Nihongo: 長井 弘和, Nagai Hirokazu)
- Junichi Watanabe (1933–2014), Japanese writer and doctor
