= Ainonai Station =

Railway station in Kitami, Hokkaido, Japan

Ainonai Station 相内駅
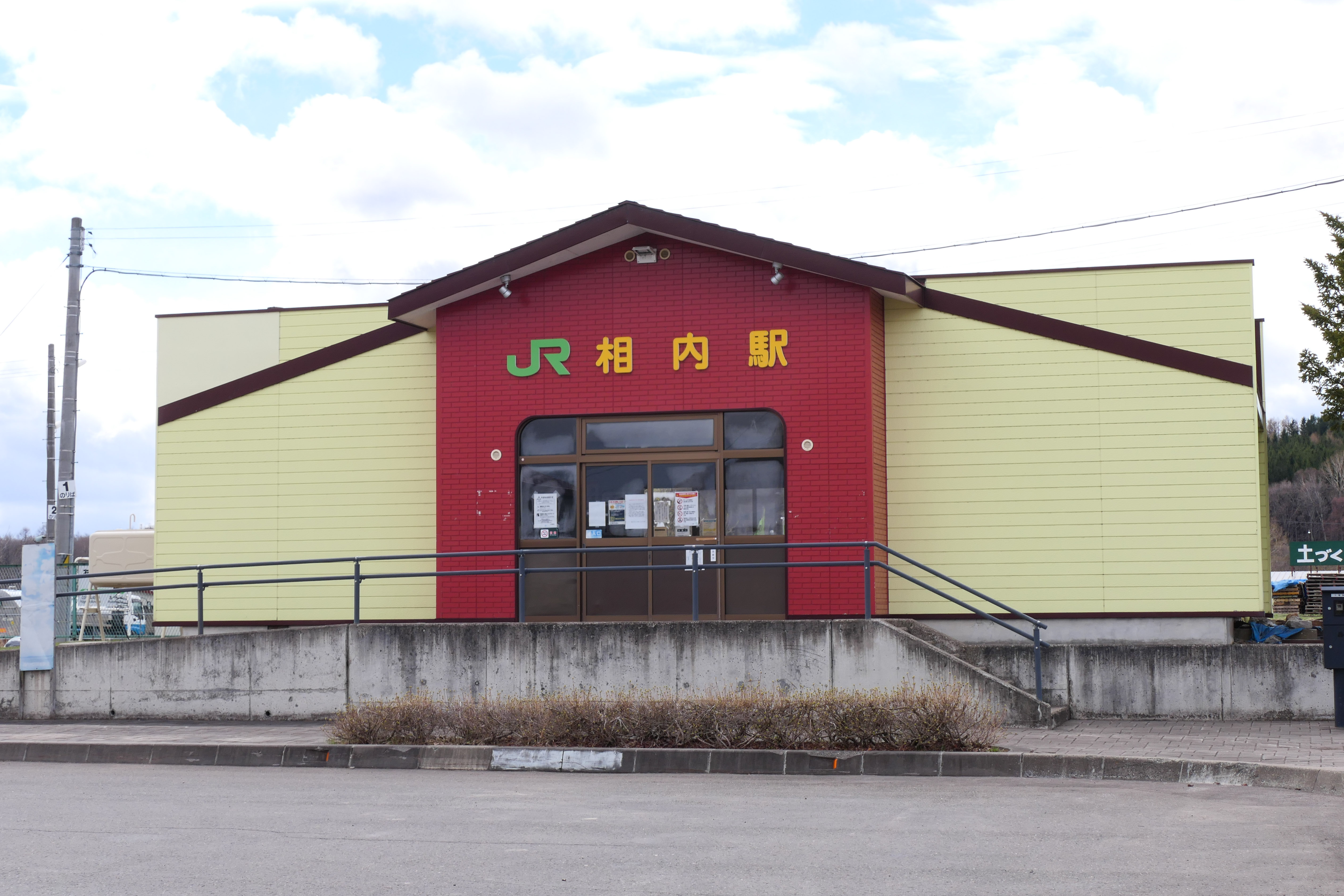
- Station building

General information
- Location: Kitami, Hokkaido; Japan
- Coordinates: 43°47′46″N 143°45′20″E
- Operator: JR Hokkaido, JR Freight
- Line: Sekihoku Main Line

Other information
- Station code: A57

History
- Opened: 1912
Location

Ainonai Station (相内駅, Ainonai-eki) is a railway station in Kitami, Hokkaidō Prefecture, Japan. Its station number is A57.

== Lines ==
- Hokkaido Railway Company
  - Sekihoku Main Line

== Adjacent stations ==
«	Service	»
Sekihoku Main Line
Rubeshibe	Limited Rapid Kitami	Higashi-Ainonai
Rubeshibe	Local	Higashi-Ainonai
Limited Express Okhotsk: Does not stop at this station
Limited Express Taisetsu: Does not stop at this station
