= Higashi-Ainonai Station =

Railway station in Kitami, Hokkaido, Japan

Coordinates: 43.8055°N 143.8097°E

Higashi-Ainonai Station 東相内駅
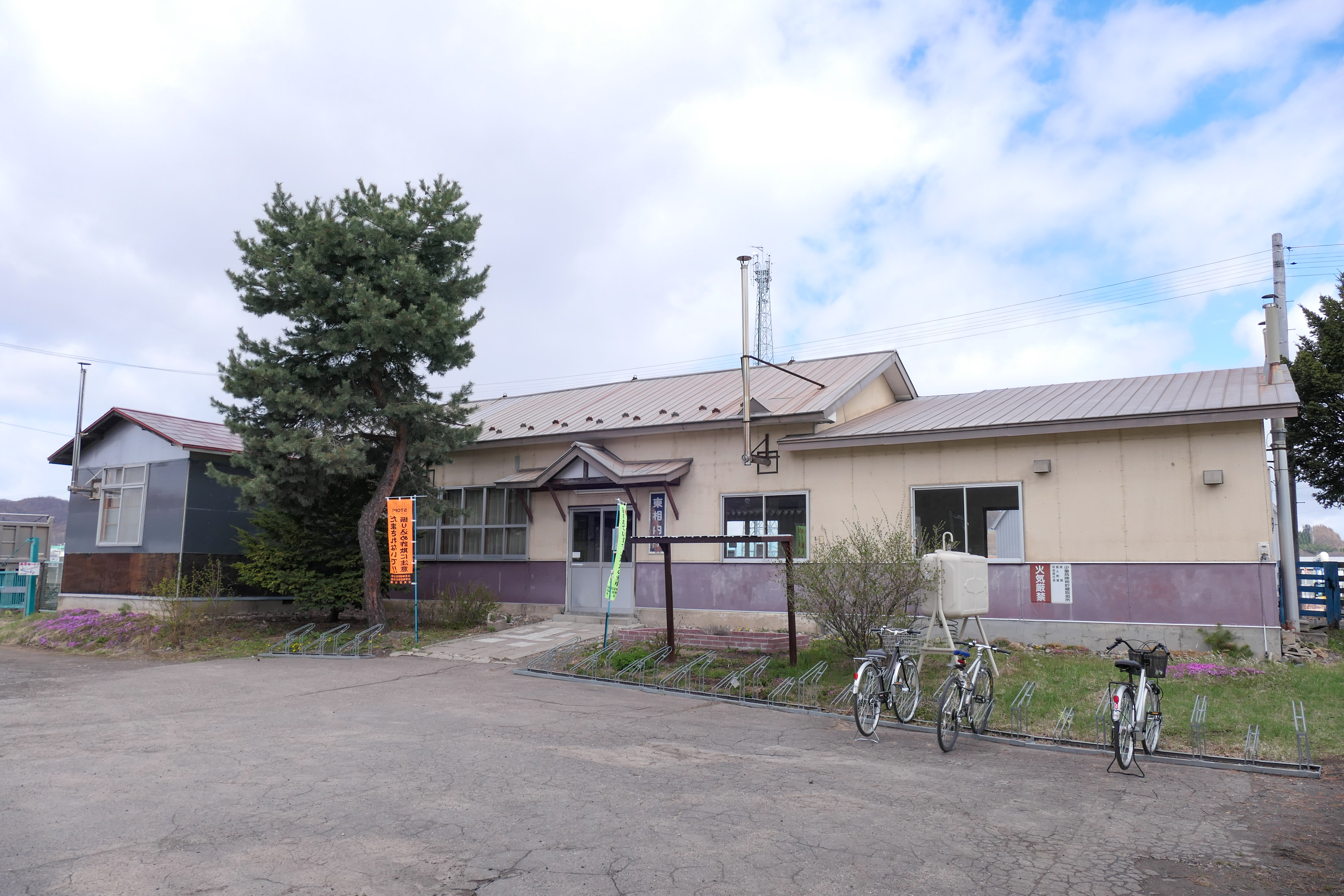
- Station building

General information
- Location: Kitami, Hokkaido; Japan
- Operator: JR Hokkaido, JR Freight
- Line: Sekihoku Main Line

Other information
- Station code: A58

History
- Opened: 1912
Location

Higashi-Ainonai Station (東相内駅, Higashi-Ainonai-eki) is a railway station in Kitami, Hokkaidō Prefecture, Japan. Its station number is A58.

== Lines ==
- Hokkaido Railway Company

- Sekihoku Main Line

== Adjacent stations ==
«	Service	»
Sekihoku Main Line
Ainonai	Limited Rapid Kitami	Nishi-Kitami
Ainonai	Local	Nishi-Kitami
Limited Express Okhotsk: Does not stop at this station
Limited Express Taisetsu: Does not stop at this station
