= Sunagawa Station =

Railway station in Sunagawa, Hokkaido, Japan

Coordinates: 43°29′35″N 141°54′33″E

Sunagawa Station 砂川駅
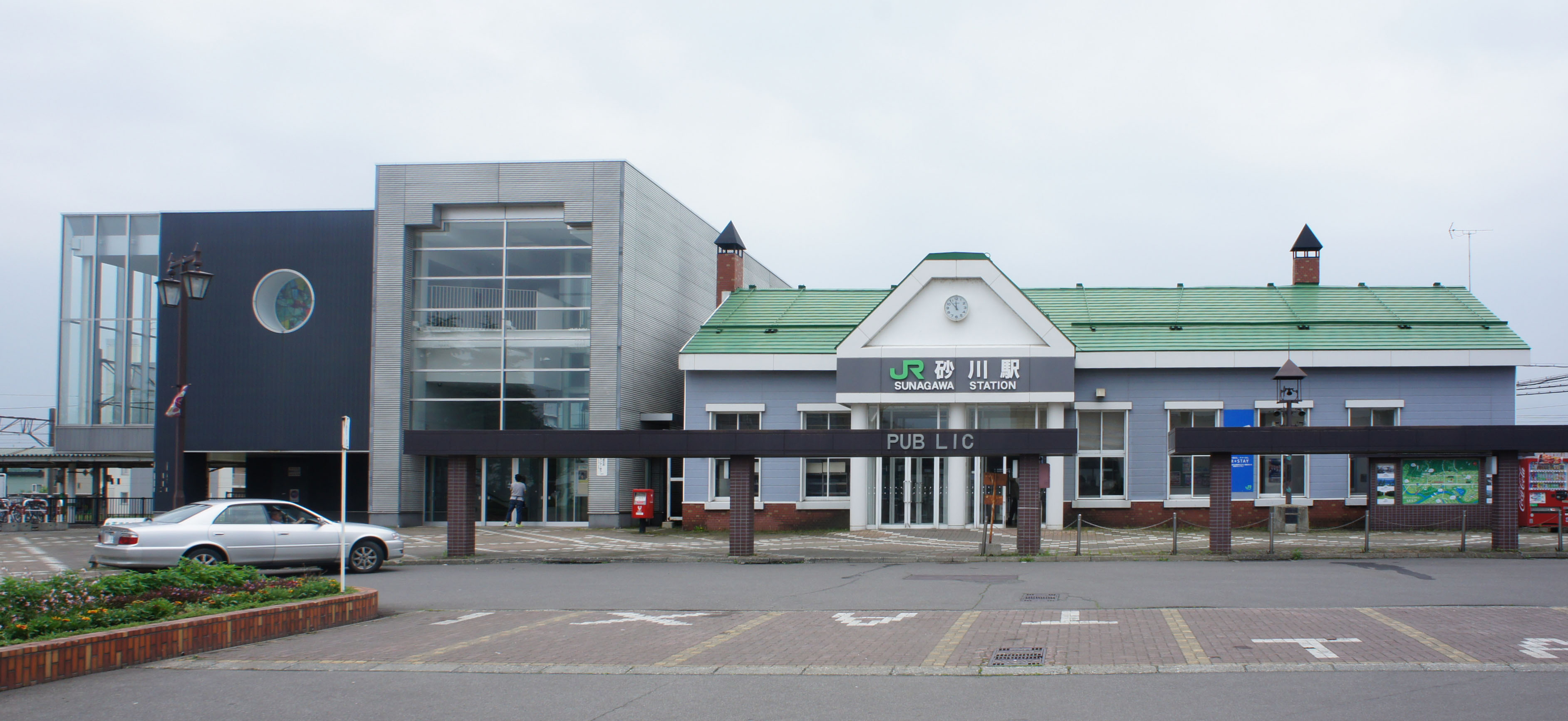

General information
- Location: Sunagawa, Hokkaido; Japan
- Operator: JR Hokkaido
- Line: Hakodate Main Line
- Platforms: 2 side platforms
- Tracks: 3

Construction
- Structure type: At grade

Other information
- Station code: A20

History
- Opened: 5 July 1891; 135 years ago

Services
Preceding station	JR Hokkaido	Following station
Local
Toyonuma towards Hakodate	Hakodate Main Line Local	Takikawa towards Asahikawa
Limited Express
Bibai towards Sapporo	Kamui	Takikawa towards Asahikawa
Bibai towards Sapporo	Lilac	Takikawa towards Asahikawa
Bibai towards Sapporo	Okhotsk	Takikawa towards Abashiri
Location

Sunagawa Station (砂川駅 Sunagawa eki) is a railway station on the Hakodate Main Line of Hokkaido Railway Company, located in Sunagawa, Hokkaidō, Japan, opened in 1891. The station previously served the closed Utashinai Line and Kamisunagawa Branch Line.

== Trains ==
Limited express

- Kamui (for New Chitose Airport, Sapporo and Asahikawa)
- Lilac (for Sapporo and Asahikawa)
- Okhotsk (for Sapporo and Abashiri)

== Places nearby ==
- Sunagawa Park Hotel
- Route 12
- Sunagawa Post Office
- Sunagawa Terminal
