= Setose Station =

Railway station in Engaru, Hokkaido, Japan

Coordinates: 44.0086°N 143.4206°E

Setose Station 瀬戸瀬駅
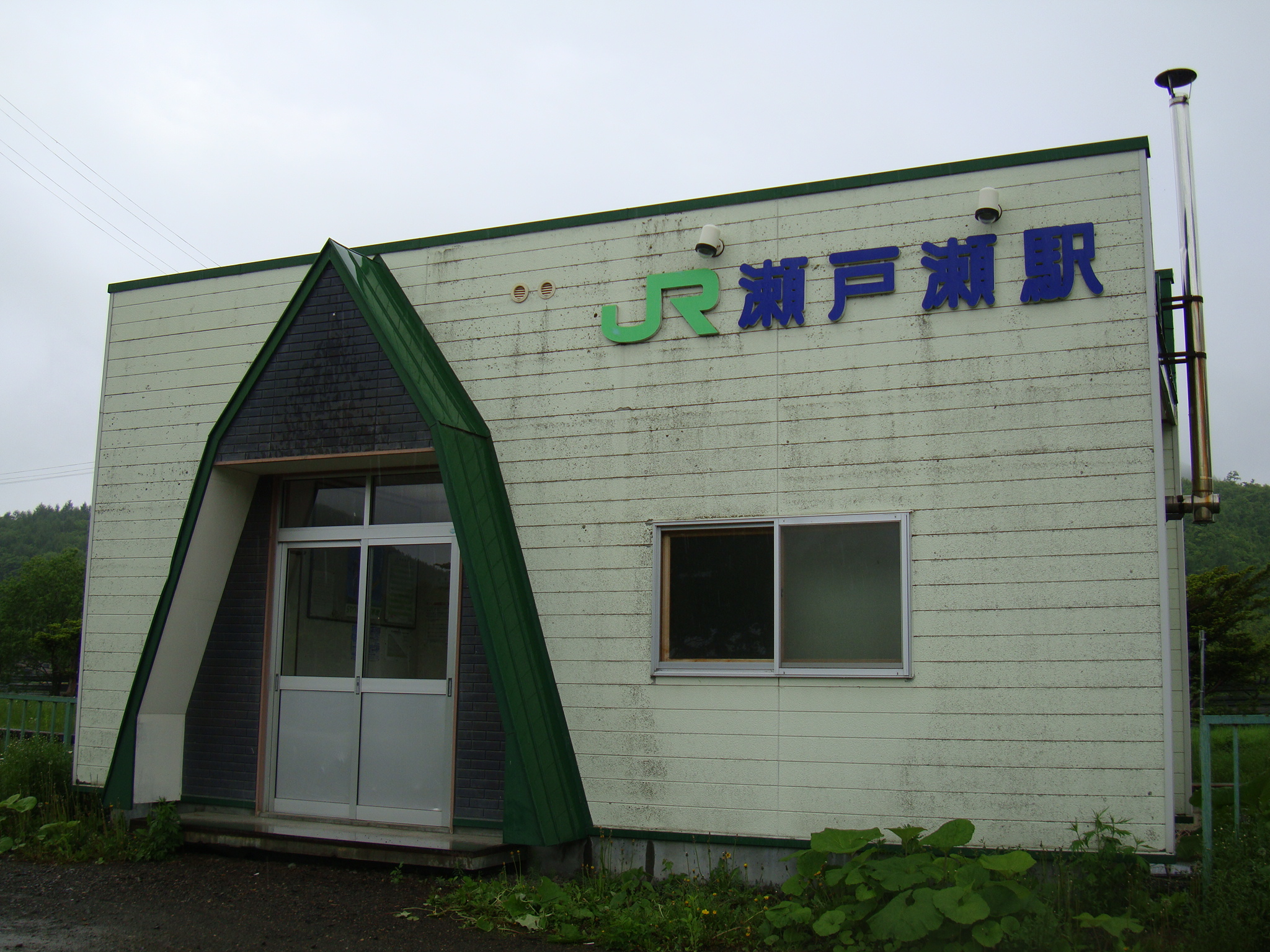

General information
- Location: Monbetsu, Hokkaido; Japan
- Operator: Hokkaido Railway Company
- Line: Sekihoku Main Line

Other information
- Station code: A49

History
- Opened: 1927
Location

Setose Station (瀬戸瀬駅, Setose-eki) is a railway station in Engaru, Monbetsu, Hokkaidō Prefecture, Japan. Its station number is A49.

== Lines ==
- Hokkaido Railway Company

- Sekihoku Main Line

== History ==
=== Future plans ===
In June 2023, this station was selected to be among 42 stations on the JR Hokkaido network to be slated for abolition owing to low ridership.

== Adjacent stations ==
«	Service	»
Sekihoku Main Line
Limited Rapid Kitami: Does not stop at this station
Limited Express Okhotsk: Does not stop at this station
Limited Express Taisetsu: Does not stop at this station
Maruseppu	Local	Engaru
