= Naie Station =

Railway station in Naie, Hokkaido, Japan

Naie Station 奈井江駅,
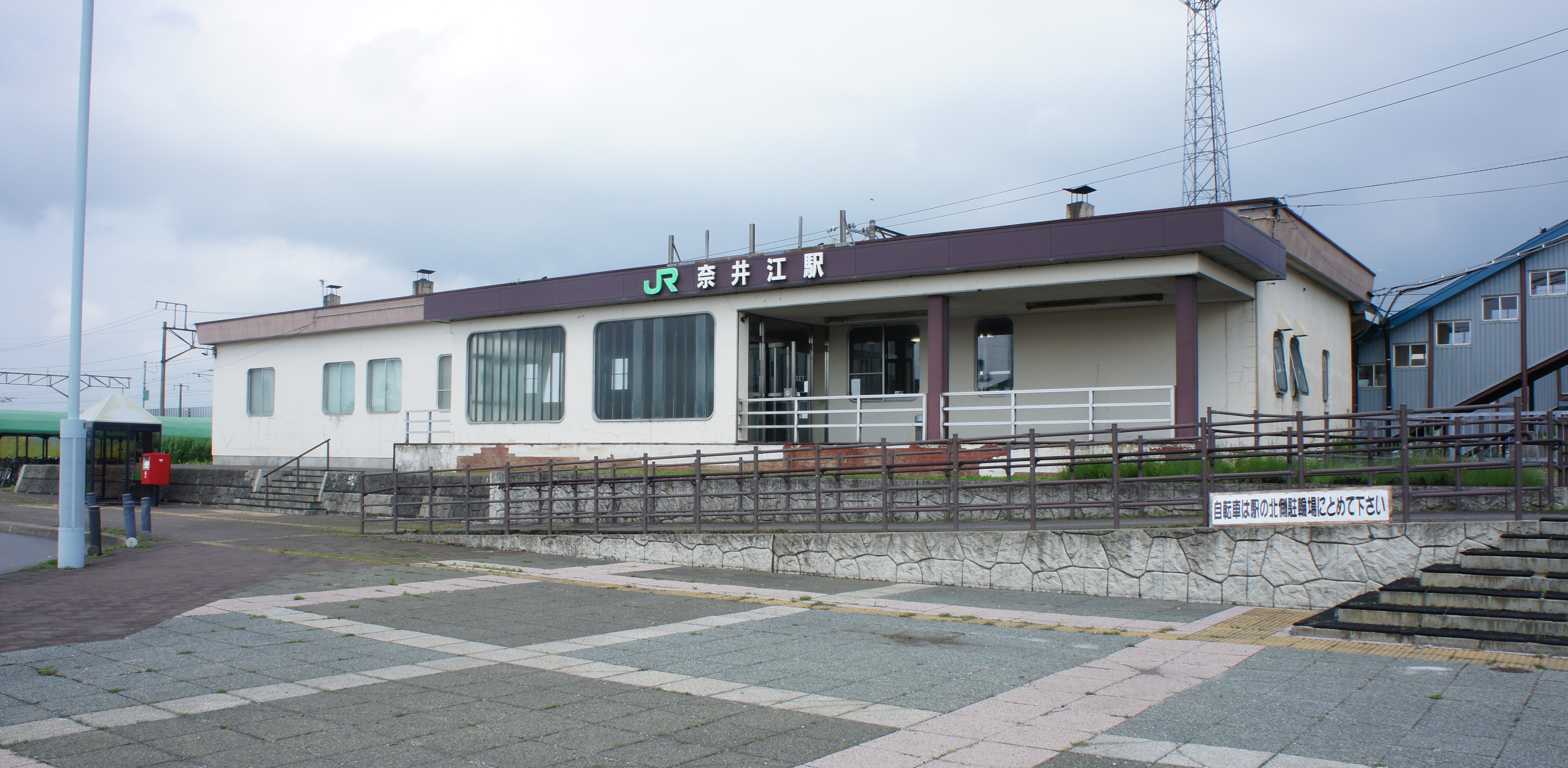

General information
- Location: Naie, Sorachi District, Hokkaidō; Japan
- Coordinates: 43.4244°N 141.8888°E
- Operator: JR Hokkaido
- Line: Hakodate Main Line

Other information
- Station code: A18
Location

Naie Station (奈井江駅, Naie-eki) is a railway station in Naie, Sorachi District, Hokkaidō, Japan.

== Lines ==
- Hokkaido Railway Company
  - Hakodate Main Line Station A18

== Adjacent stations ==
«	Service	»
Hakodate Main Line
Limited Express Sōya: Does not stop at this station
Limited Express Okhotsk: Does not stop at this station
Chashinai	Sectional Rapid	Toyonuma
Chashinai	Local	Toyonuma
