= Yasukuni Station =

Railway station in Engaru, Hokkaido, Japan

Coordinates: 43.9930°N 143.5350°E

Yasukuni Station 安国駅
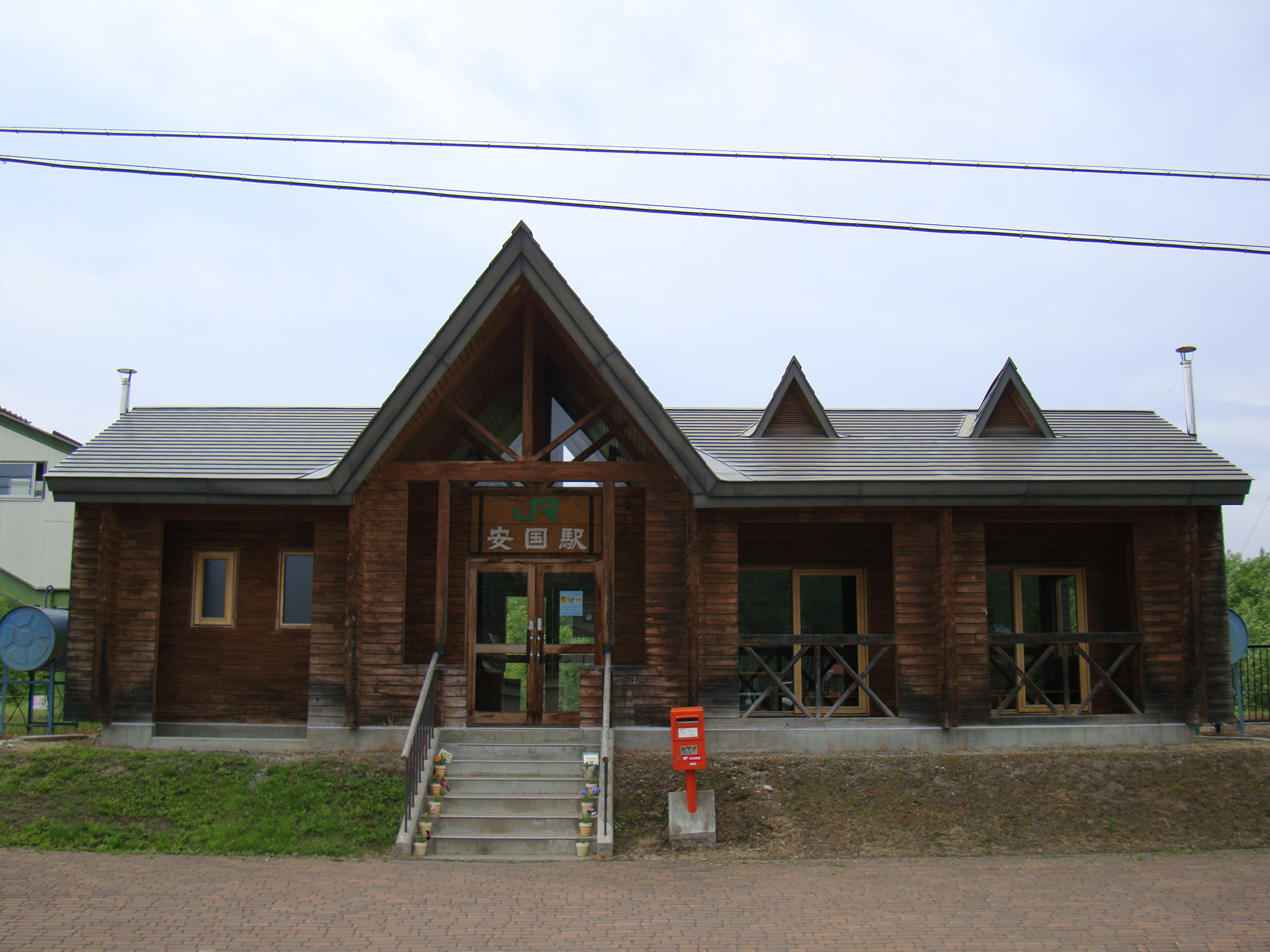

General information
- Location: Engaru, Hokkaido; Japan
- Operator: JR Hokkaido
- Line: Sekihoku Main Line

Other information
- Station code: A51

History
- Opened: 1914
Location

Yasukuni Station (安国駅, Yasukuni-eki) is a railway station in Engaru, Monbetsu, Hokkaidō Prefecture, Japan. Its station number is A51.

== Lines ==
- Hokkaido Railway Company

- Sekihoku Main Line

== Adjacent stations ==
«	Service	»
Sekihoku Main Line
Engaru	Limited Rapid Kitami	Ikutahara
Engaru	Local	Ikutahara
Limited Express Okhotsk: Does not stop at this station
Limited Express Taisetsu: Does not stop at this station
