= Maruseppu Station =

Railway station in Engaru, Hokkaido, Japan

Coordinates: 44.0065°N 143.3356°E

Maruseppu Station 丸瀬布駅
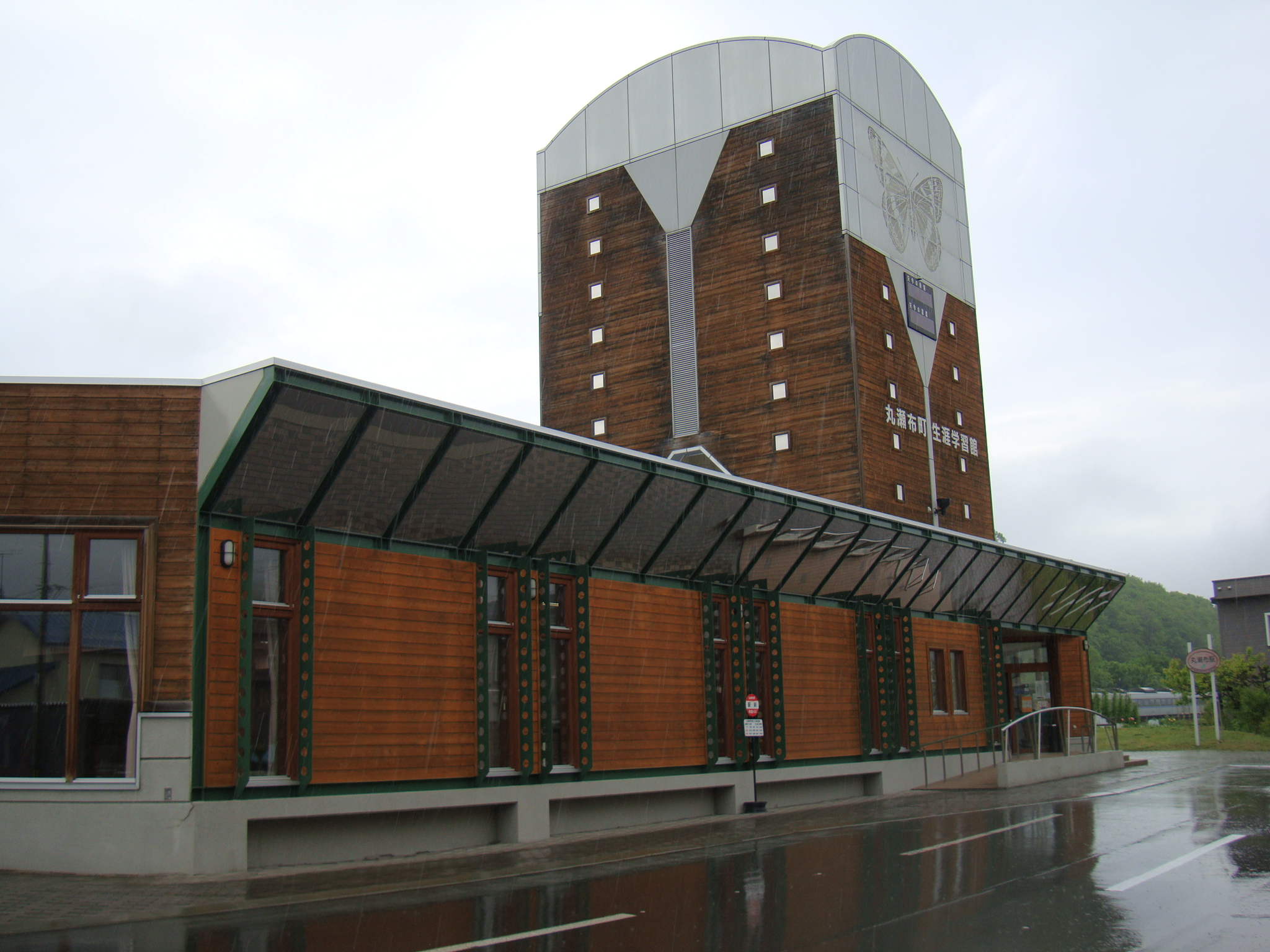

General information
- Location: Monbetsu, Hokkaido; Japan
- Operator: Hokkaido Railway Company
- Line: Sekihoku Main Line

Other information
- Station code: A48

History
- Opened: 1927
Location

Maruseppu Station (丸瀬布駅, Maruseppu-eki) is a railway station in Engaru, Monbetsu, Hokkaidō Prefecture, Japan. Its station number is A48.

== Lines ==
- Hokkaido Railway Company

- Sekihoku Main Line

== Adjacent stations ==
«	Service	»
Sekihoku Main Line
Shirataki	Limited Express Okhotsk	Engaru
Shirataki or Kamikawa	Limited Express Taisetsu	Engaru
Shirataki	Limited Rapid Kitami	Engaru
Shirataki	Local	Setose
