= Engaru Station =

Railway station in Engaru, Hokkaido, Japan

Coordinates: 44.0604°N 143.5205°E

Engaru Station 遠軽駅
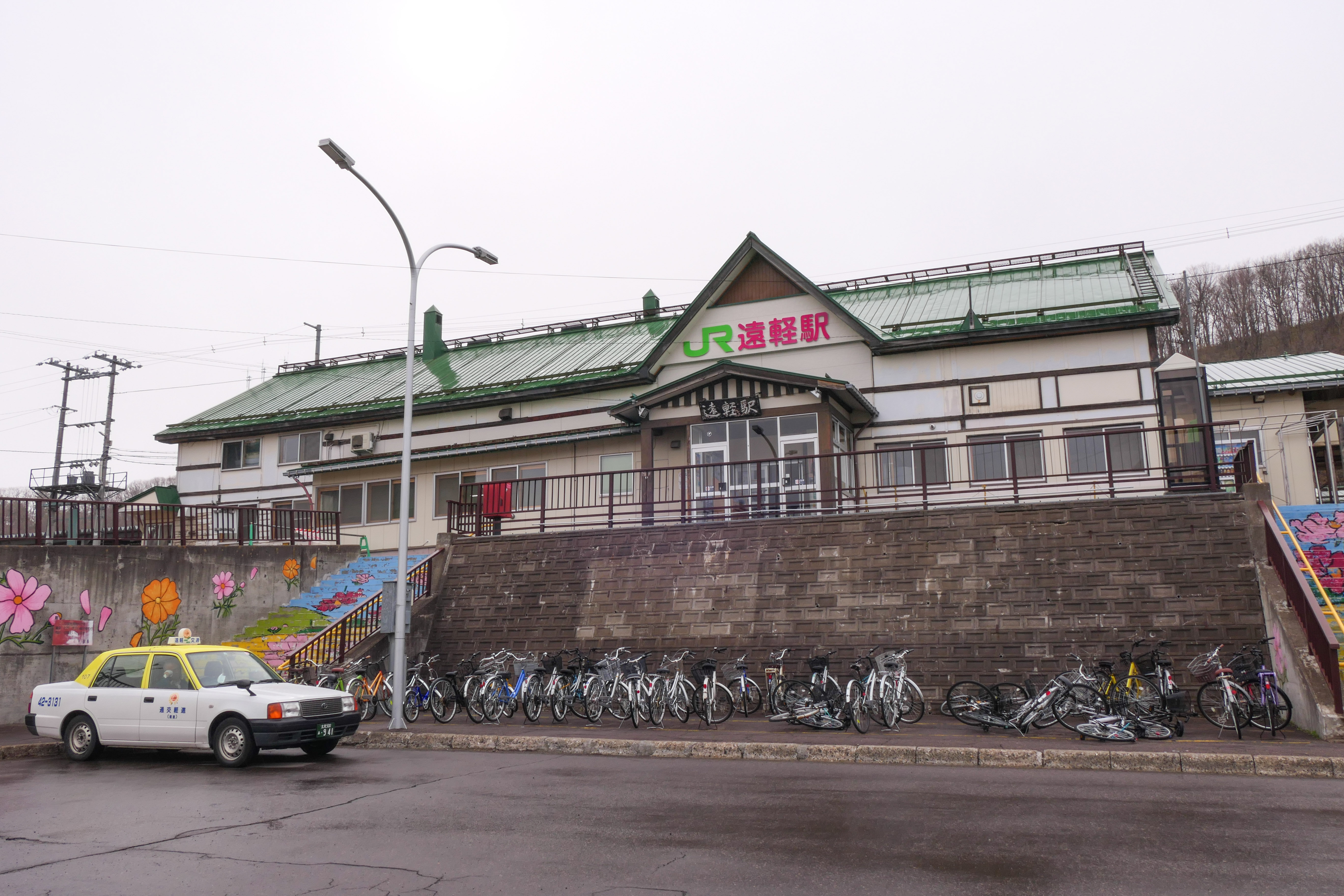
- Station building (May 2021)

General information
- Location: Engaru, Monbetsu District, Hokkaido; Japan
- Operator: JR Hokkaido
- Lines: Sekihoku Main Line; Nayoro Main Line (Closed)

Other information
- Station code: A50

History
- Opened: November 1st, 1915

Passengers
- FY2023: 272 (daily)
Location

Engaru Station (遠軽駅, Engaru-eki) is a railway station in Engaru, Monbetsu, Hokkaidō Prefecture, Japan. Its station number is A50.

== Lines ==
- Hokkaido Railway Company
  - Sekihoku Main Line
  - Nayoro Main Line (closed May 1, 1989)

== Adjacent stations ==
«	Service	»
Sekihoku Main Line
Maruseppu	Limited Express Okhotsk	Ikutahara
Maruseppu or Shirataki	Limited Express Taisetsu	Ikutahara
Maruseppu	Limited Rapid Kitami	Yasukuni
Setose	Local	Yasukuni
