= Nishi-Rubeshibe Station =

Railway station in Kitami, Hokkaido, Japan

Coordinates: 43.7853°N 143.6034°E

Nishi-Rubeshibe Station 西留辺蘂駅
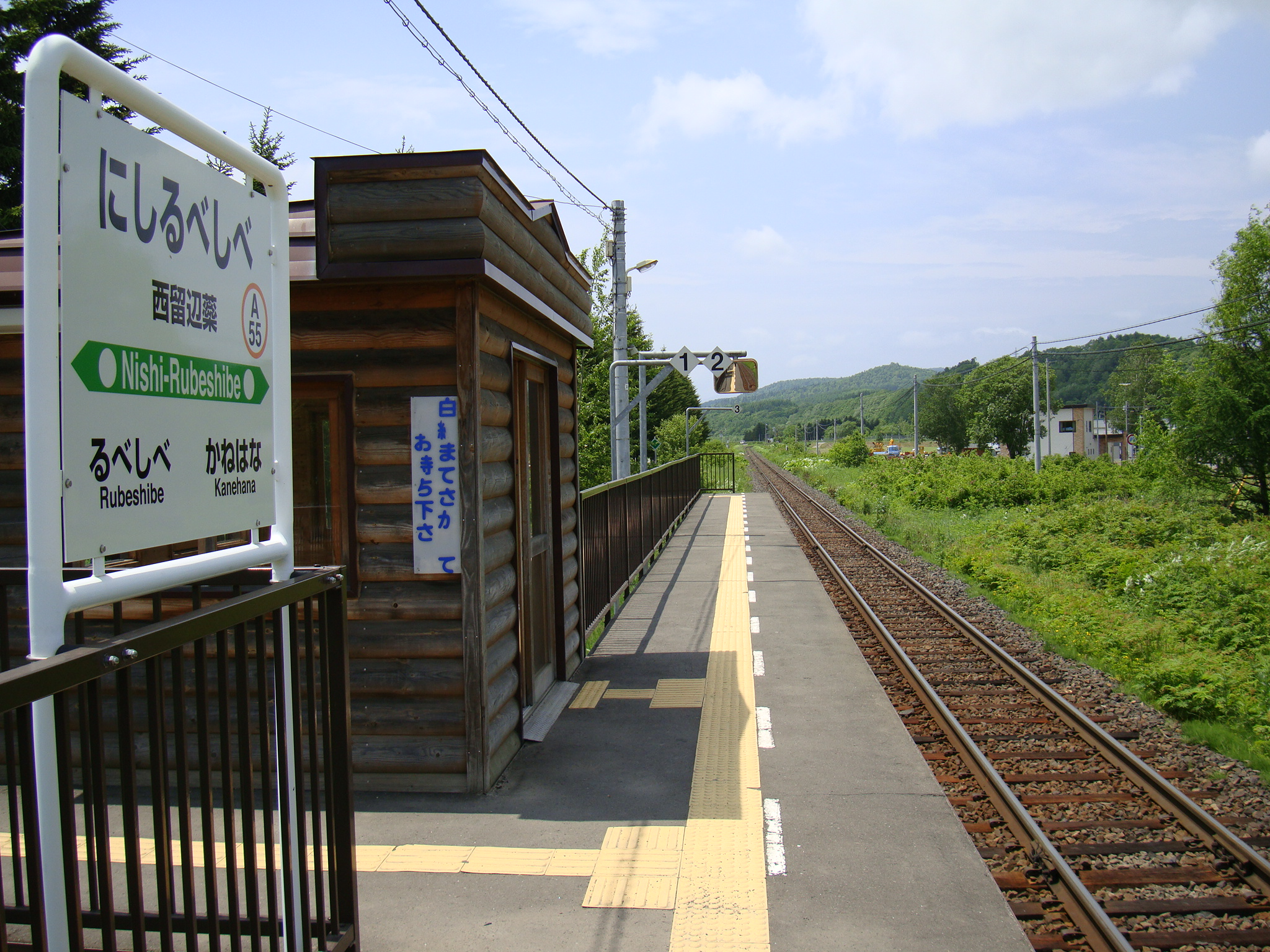
- Nishi-Rubeshibe Station platform, June 2009

General information
- Location: Kitami, Hokkaido; Japan
- Operator: Hokkaido Railway Company
- Line: Sekihoku Main Line

Other information
- Station code: A55
Location

Nishi-Rubeshibe Station (西留辺蘂駅, Nishi-Rubeshibe-eki) is a railway station in Kitami, Hokkaidō Prefecture, Japan. Its station number is A55.

== Lines ==
- Hokkaido Railway Company

- Sekihoku Main Line

== Adjacent stations ==
«	Service	»
Sekihoku Main Line
Limited Rapid Kitami: Does not stop at this station
Limited Express Okhotsk: Does not stop at this station
Limited Express Taisetsu: Does not stop at this station
Ikutahara	Local	Rubeshibe
