= Shirataki Station =

Railway station in Engaru, Hokkaido, Japan

Coordinates: 43.8842°N 143.1809°E

Shirataki Station 白滝駅
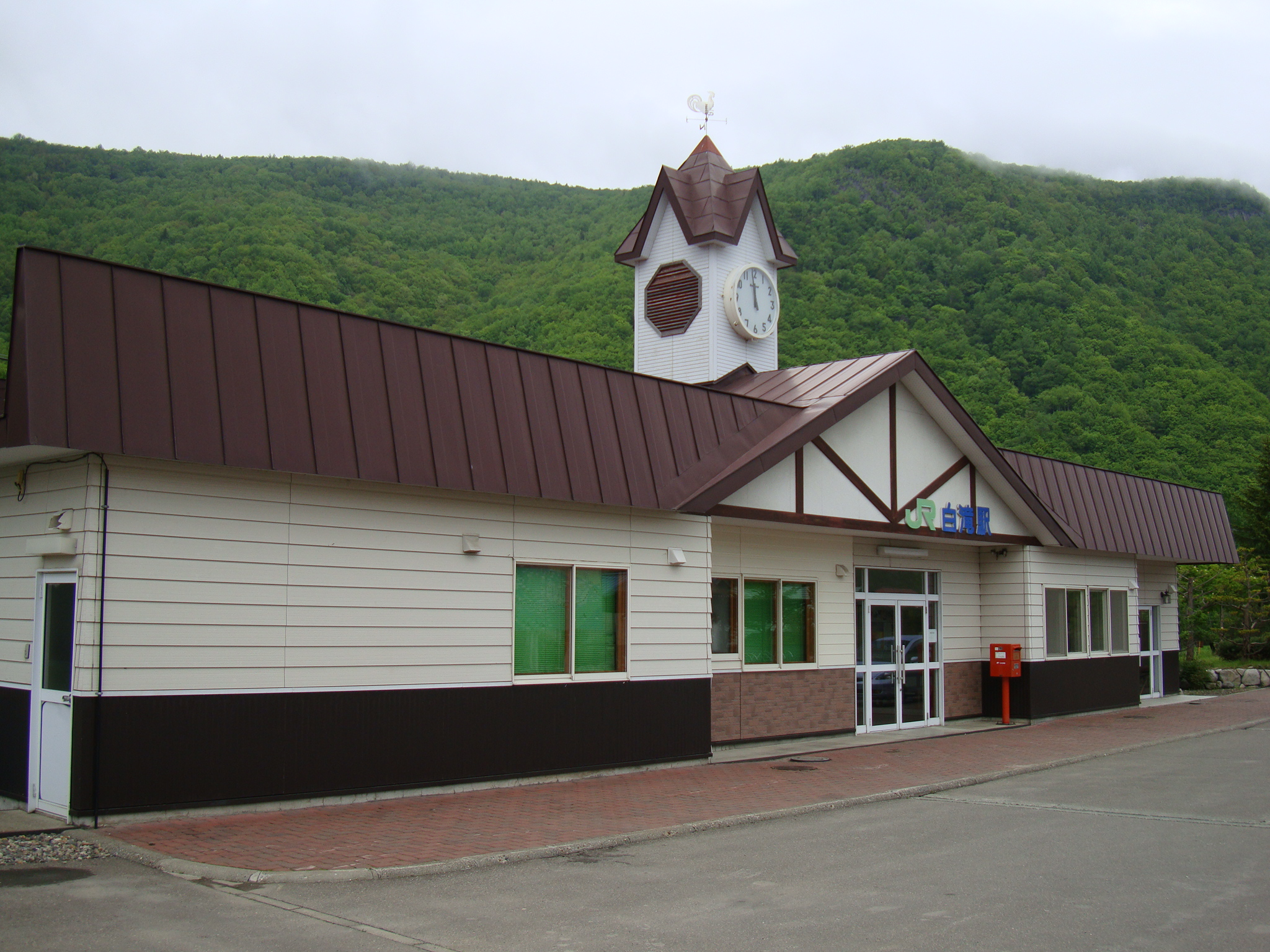
- Shirataki Station in June 2009

General information
- Location: Engaru, Monbetsu District, Hokkaido; Japan
- Operator: JR Hokkaido
- Line: ■ Sekihoku Main Line

Other information
- Station code: A45

History
- Opened: 12 August 1929
Location
- Location within Japan

Shirataki Station (白滝駅, Shirataki-eki) is a railway station on the Sekihoku Main Line in Engaru, Monbetsu District, Hokkaido, Japan, operated by Hokkaido Railway Company (JR Hokkaido).

== Lines ==
Shirataki Station is served by the Sekihoku Main Line, and is numbered "A45".

== Adjacent stations ==
«	Service	»
Sekihoku Main Line
Kamikawa	Limited Express Okhotsk	Maruseppu
Kamikawa	Limited Express Taisetsu	Maruseppu or Engaru
Kamikawa	Limited Rapid Kitami	Maruseppu
Kamikawa	Local	Maruseppu

== History ==
The station opened on 12 August 1929. With the privatization of Japanese National Railways (JNR) on 1 April 1987, the station came under the control of JR Hokkaido.

== See also ==
- List of railway stations in Japan
