= Rubeshibe Station =

Railway station in Kitami, Hokkaido, Japan

Coordinates: 43.7856°N 143.6214°E

Rubeshibe Station 留辺蘂駅
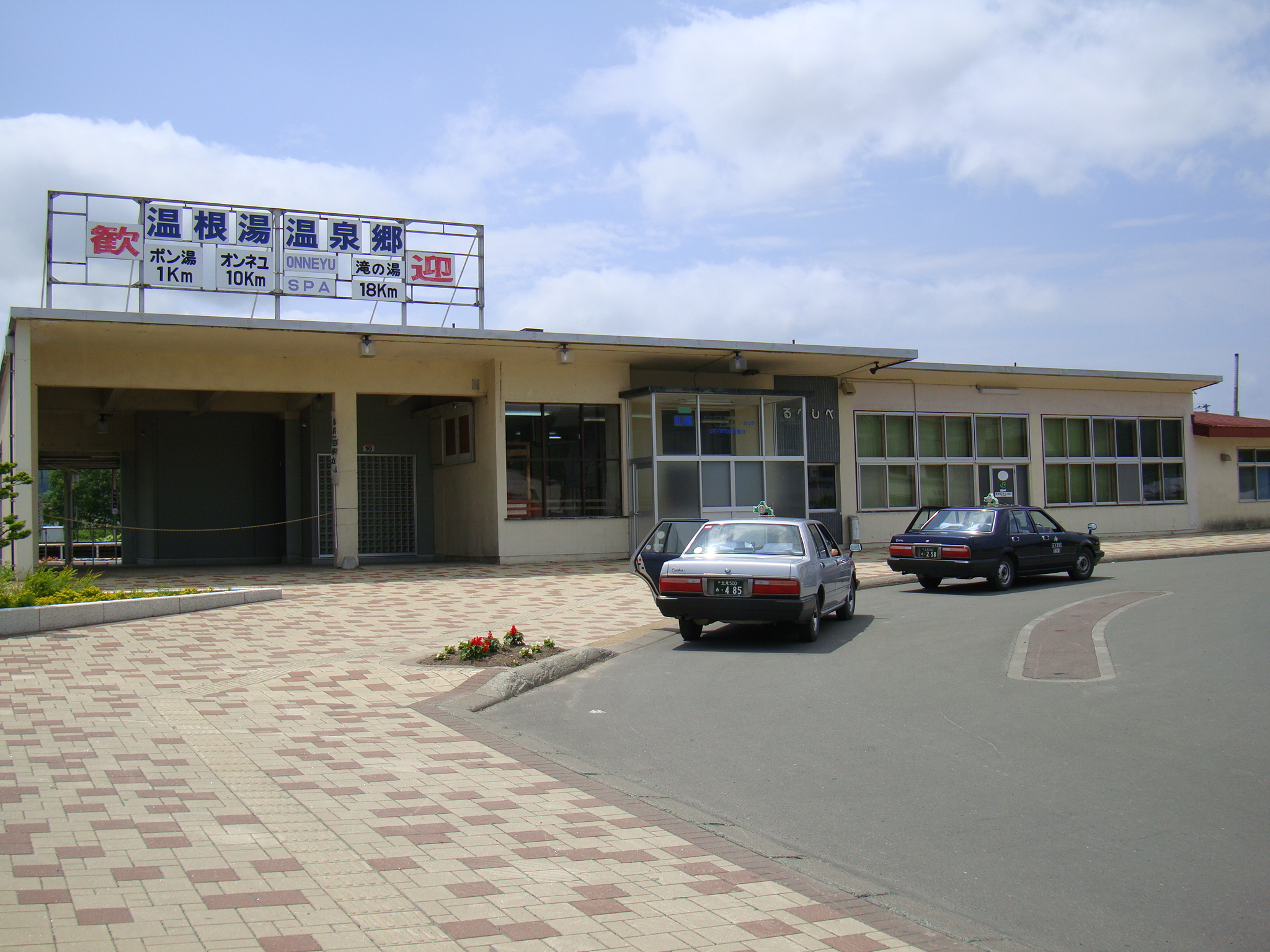
- Station building

General information
- Location: Kitami, Hokkaido; Japan
- Operator: JR Hokkaido, JR Freight
- Line: Sekihoku Main Line

Other information
- Station code: A56

History
- Opened: 1912
Location

Rubeshibe Station (留辺蘂駅, Rubeshibe-eki) is a railway station in Kitami, Hokkaidō Prefecture, Japan. Its station number is A56.

== Lines ==
- Hokkaido Railway Company

- Sekihoku Main Line

== Adjacent stations ==
«	Service	»
Sekihoku Main Line
Ikutahara	Limited Express Okhotsk	Kitami
Ikutahara	Limited Express Taisetsu	Kitami
Ikutahara	Limited Rapid Kitami	Ainonai
Nishi-Rubeshibe	Local	Ainonai
