= Shinmei Line =

Former railway line in Hokkaido, Japan

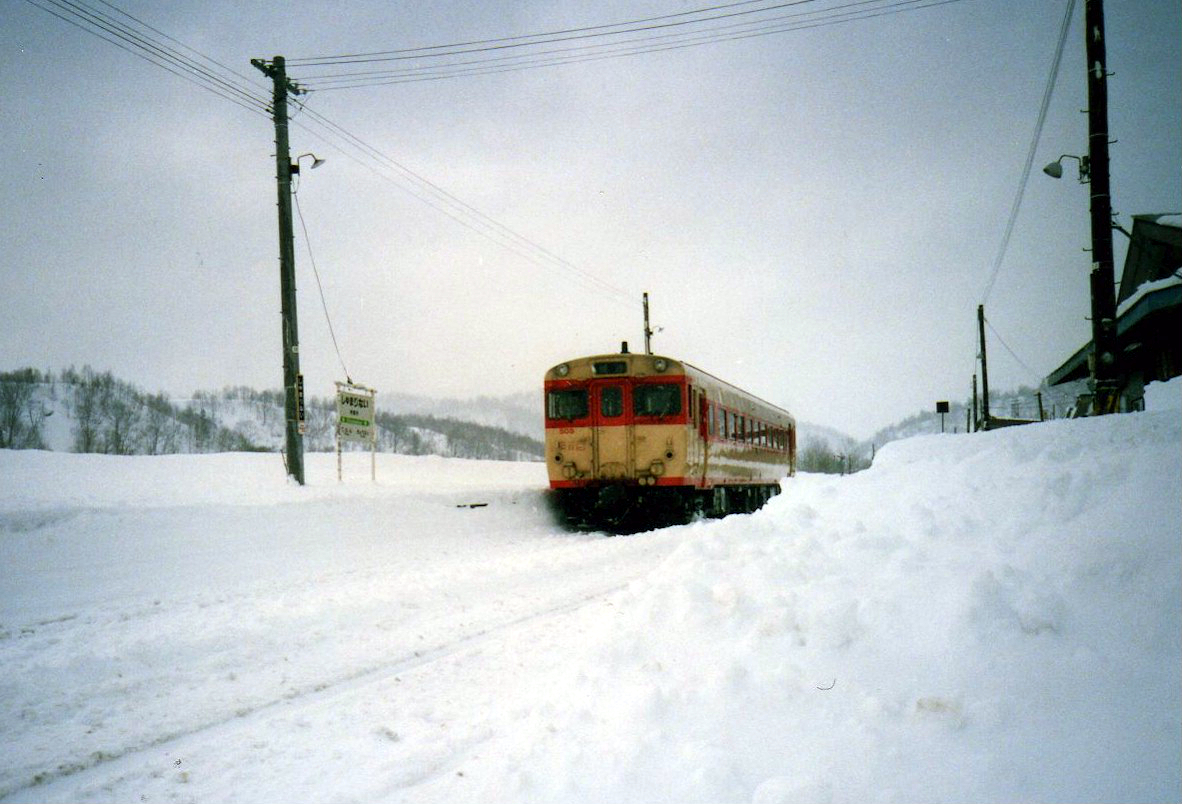
- A single KiHa 53 series DMU on the Shinmei Line in February 1994

Overview
- Status: Closed
- Owner: Hokkaido Railway Company
- Locale: JR Hokkaido
- Termini: Fukagawa; Nayoro
- Stations: 21

Service
- Type: Regional rail
- Operator: Hokkaido Railway Company

History
- Opened: 25 October 1924 (Uryū Line); 10 November 1937 (Meiu Line)
- Closed: 4 September 1995

Technical
- Line length: 121.8 km (75.7 mi)
- Number of tracks: Entire line single tracked
- Character: Rural
- Track gauge: 1,067 mm (3 ft 6 in)
- Electrification: None
Route map

The Shinmei Line (深名線, Shinmei-sen) was a Japanese railway line in Hokkaido operated by the Hokkaido Railway Company (JR Hokkaido) which connected Fukagawa Station in Fukagawa and Nayoro Station in Nayoro.

== Stations ==
Stops legend: ●: Train meet possible X:Train meet impossible

No.	Station name	Japanese	Between (km)	Distance (km)	Stop	Transfers Notes	Location
A24	Fukagawa	深川		0.0	●	■ Hakodate Main Line ■ ~~Rumoi Main Line~~ (Abolished 1 April 2026)	Fukagawa
	Maruyama	円山	4.7	4.7	X		Fukagawa
	Kami-Tadoshi	上多度志	6.1	10.8	X		Fukagawa
	Tadoshi	多度志	3.2	14.0	X		Fukagawa
	Uma	宇摩	5.4	19.4	X		Fukagawa
	Horonari	幌成	2.9	22.3	X		Fukagawa
	Shimo-Horonari	下幌成	1.8	24.1	X		Fukagawa
	Takadomari	鷹泊	3.2	27.3	X		Fukagawa
	Numaushi	沼牛	10.6	37.9	X		Uryu District; Horokanai
	Shin-Nariu	新成生	2.0	39.9	X		Uryu District; Horokanai
	Horokanai	幌加内	3.8	43.7	●		Uryu District; Horokanai
	Kami-Horokanai	上幌加内	3.1	46.8	X		Uryu District; Horokanai
	Uembetsu	雨煙別	4.3	51.1	X	All trains passed this station between December 1 and April 20. Closed 10 March 1990	Uryu District; Horokanai
	Seiwa-Onsen	政和温泉	5.1	56.2	X	All trains passed this station between December 1 and April 20. Closed 10 March 1990	Uryu District; Horokanai
	Seiwa	政和	2.5	58.7	X		Uryu District; Horokanai
	Shintomi	新富	5.5	64.2	X	Closed 1 September 1990	Uryu District; Horokanai
	Soeushinai	添牛内	4.4	68.6	X		Uryu District; Horokanai
	Ōmagari	大曲	3.6	72.2	X	Closed 1 February 1976	Uryu District; Horokanai
	Kyōei	共栄	3.3	75.5	X		Uryu District; Horokanai
	Shumarinai	朱鞠内	3.3	78.8	●	Meiu Line (Uncompleted)	Uryu District; Horokanai
	Kohan	湖畔	1.9	80.7	X		Uryu District; Horokanai
	Utsunai	宇津内	4.3	85.0	X	Closed 19 November 1956	Uryu District; Horokanai
	Fukinodai	蕗ノ台	4.5	89.5	X	All trains passed this station between December 1 and April 30. Closed 10 March 1990	Uryu District; Horokanai
	Shirakaba	白樺	4.1	93.6	X	All trains passed this station between December 1 and April 30. Closed 10 March 1990	Uryu District; Horokanai
	Kita-Moshiri	北母子里	5.4	99.0	X		Uryu District; Horokanai
	Teshio-Yayoi	天塩弥生	15.6	114.6	X		Nayoro
	Nishi-Nayoro	西名寄	3.2	117.8	X		Nayoro
W48	Nayoro	名寄	4.0	121.8	●	Nayoro Main Line (Abolished 1 May 1989) Sōya Main Line	Nayoro

== History ==
Uryū Line began construction in 1922, to connect Shumarinai and Fukagawa. The construction was split in six phases and the construction was completed by 1932. The line was renamed to Horokanai Line in 1931.

Meiu Line (名雨線) began construction in 1935 to connect Nayoro to Shumarinai. The line was completed in 1939, and the two lines were renamed to Shinmei Line, taking letters from the two terminus.

=== Post war ===
In 1960s, due to the decline of coal mines and introduction of cheaper foreign woods, the economy of the nearby municipalities began to decline. This led to the slow decrease in the population. Population in Horokonai decreased to 7,283 by 1970 compared to 12,016 in 1960. In areas close to Shirakaba station and Fukinodai, settlements disappeared, and with the ongoing motorization and the improvements in roads, the number of users fell to one-third of its peak.

Following the huge drop in users and operating ratio hitting 2,785, the line was listed as one of the Deficit 83 Lines movement and later Specified local lines. However, due to lack of replacement roads, it was not closed by the movement, the line continued to operate until 1995, when it was closed and switched to bus service by JR Hokkaido Bus Company.

== Rolling stock ==
Six JNR Class C11s were used in the line from 1941 to 1949. JGR Class 8620 and JNR Class 9600 were used until the 1970s.

KiHa 01 series was used from August 1955, but were slowly replaced by KiHa 05, which were used by 1966. After 1966, KiHa 21 and KiHa 22 DMU made for Hokkaido were used.

From March 1986, KiHa 53, KiHa 54, and KiHa 40 were used until the closure of the entire line.
