= Kitami Station (Hokkaido) =

Railway station in Kitami, Hokkaido, Japan

Coordinates: 43.8053°N 143.8981°E

Kitami Station 北見駅
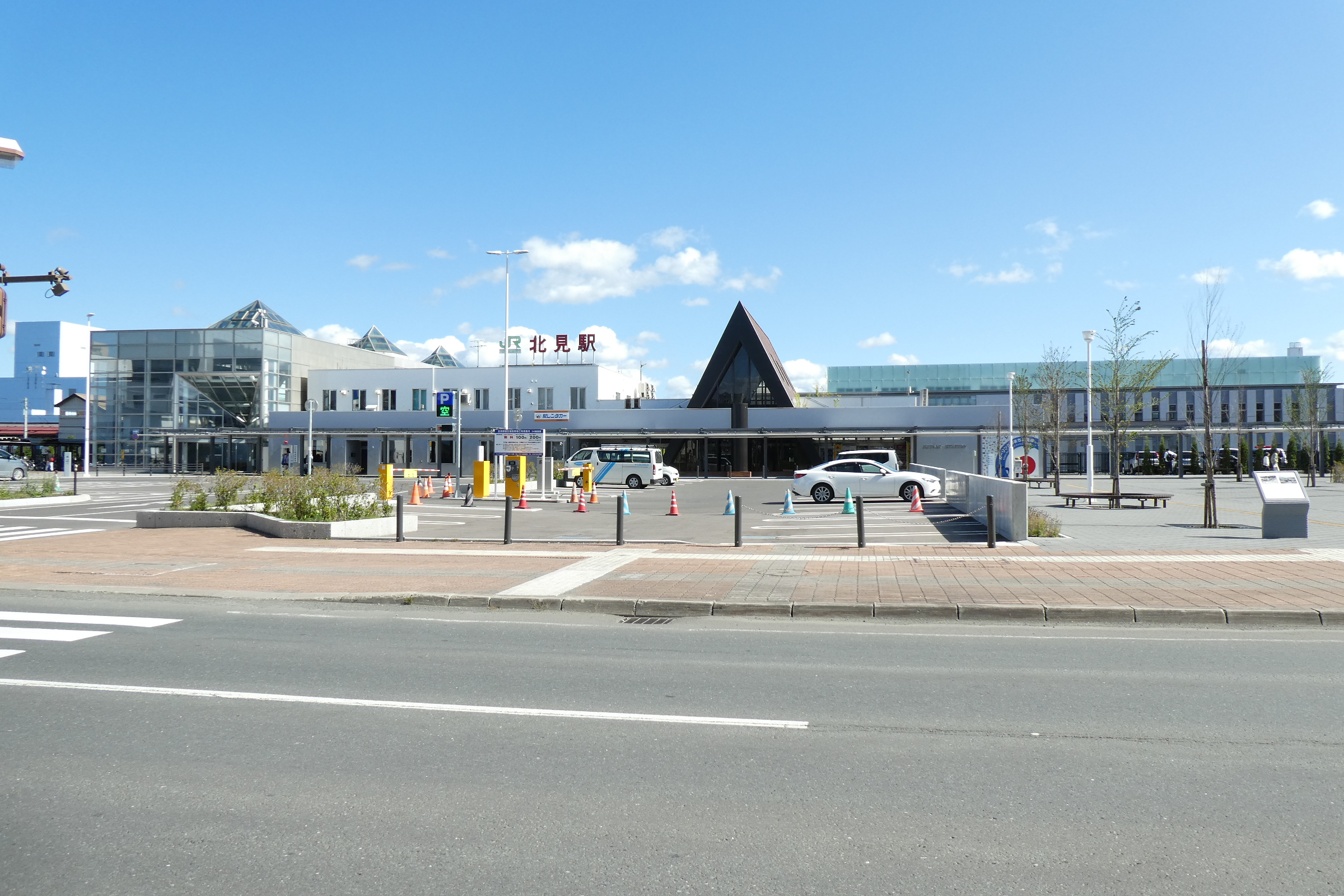
- Station building

General information
- Location: Kitami, Hokkaido （北海道北見市） Japan
- Operator: JR Hokkaido, JR Freight
- Line: Sekihoku Main Line

Other information
- Station code: A60

History
- Opened: 25 September 1911
- Former names: Nokkeushi Station (野付牛駅, until 1 October 1942)

Passengers
- FY2023: 946 (daily)
Location

Kitami Station (北見駅, Kitami-eki) is a railway station in Kitami, Hokkaido Prefecture, Japan. Its station number is A60.

== Lines ==
- Hokkaido Railway Company

- Sekihoku Main Line

== History ==
The station opened on 25 September 1911.

On 21 April 2006, the Furusato Ginga Line ceased services from this station to Ikeda.

== Adjacent stations ==
«	Service	»
Sekihoku Main Line
Rubeshibe	Limited Express Okhotsk	Bihoro
Rubeshibe	Limited Express Taisetsu	Bihoro
Nishi-Kitami	Limited Rapid Kitami	Terminus
Nishi-Kitami	Local	Hakuyō
