= Toyonuma Station =

Railway station in Sunagawa, Hokkaido, Japan

Toyonuma Station 豊沼駅
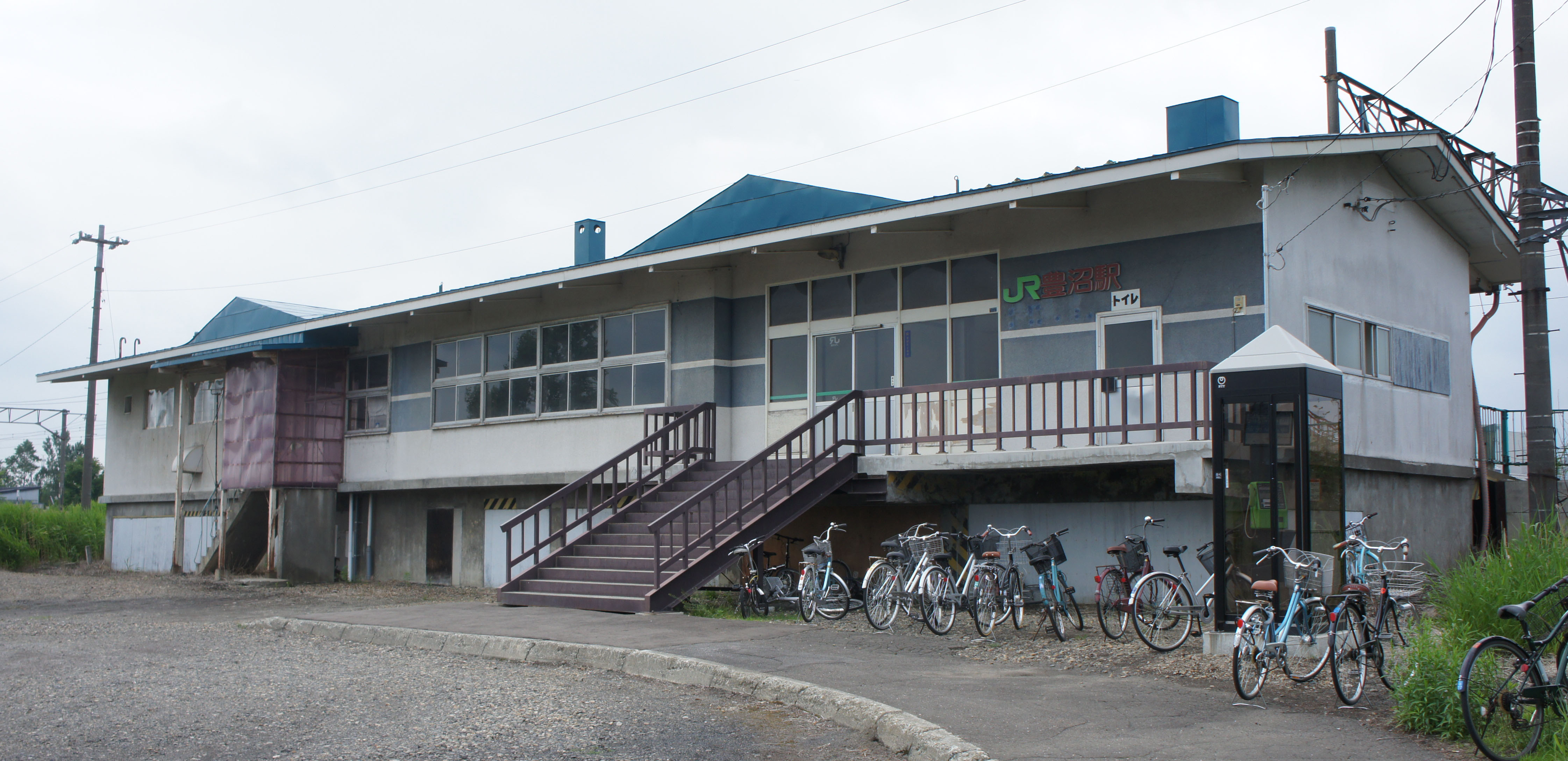

General information
- Location: Sunagawa, Hokkaidō; Japan
- Coordinates: 43.4643°N 141.9008°E
- Operator: JR Hokkaido
- Line: Hakodate Main Line

Other information
- Station code: A19
Location

Toyonuma Station (豊沼駅, Toyonuma-eki) is a railway station in Sunagawa, Hokkaidō, Japan.

== Lines ==
- Hokkaido Railway Company
  - Hakodate Main Line Station A19

== Adjacent stations ==
| « | Service | » |
Hakodate Main Line
Limited Express Sōya: Does not stop at this station
Limited Express Okhotsk: Does not stop at this station
| Naie | Sectional Rapid | Sunagawa |
| Naie | Local | Sunagawa |
