= Ikutahara Station =

Railway station in Engaru, Hokkaido, Japan

Coordinates: 43.9231°N 143.5353°E

Ikutahara Station 生田原駅
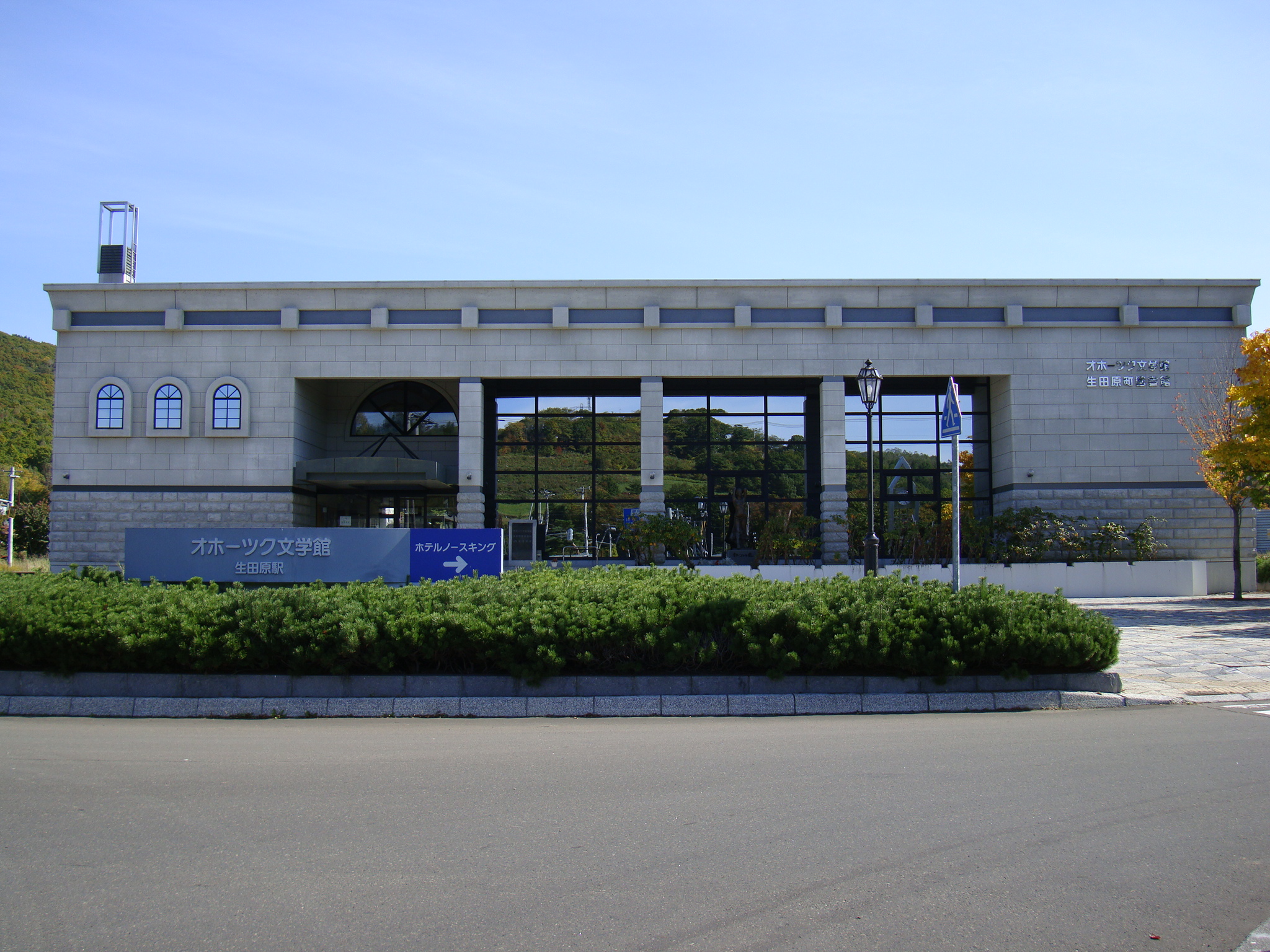
- Station building

General information
- Location: Monbetsu, Hokkaido; Japan
- Operator: Hokkaido Railway Company
- Line: Sekihoku Main Line

Other information
- Station code: A53

History
- Opened: 1914
Location

Ikutahara Station (生田原駅, Ikutahara-eki) is a railway station in Engaru, Monbetsu, Hokkaidō Prefecture, Japan. Its station number is A53.

== Lines ==
- Hokkaido Railway Company

- Sekihoku Main Line

== Adjacent stations ==
«	Service	»
Sekihoku Main Line
Engaru	Limited Express Okhotsk	Rubeshibe
Engaru	Limited Express Taisetsu	Rubeshibe
Yasukuni	Limited Rapid Kitami	Rubeshibe
Yasukuni	Local	Nishi-Rubeshibe
