= Okhotsk (train) =

Express train service between Sapporo and Abashiri, Japan

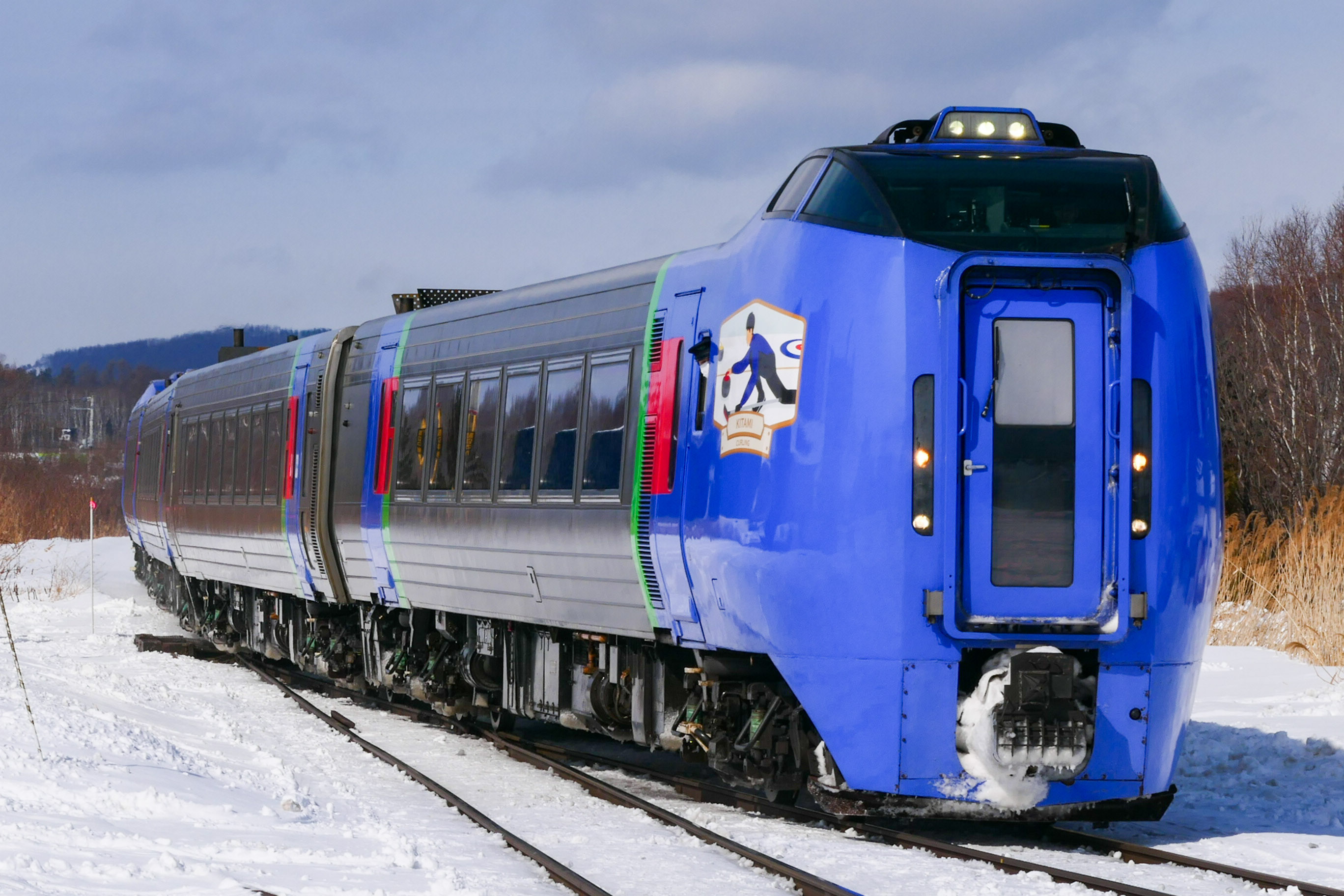
- KiHa 283 series DMU forming an Okhotsk service, February 2025

Overview
- Service type: Limited express
- Status: Operational
- Locale: Hokkaido, Japan
- First service: 22 September 1959
- Current operator: JR Hokkaido
- Former operator: JNR

Route
- Termini: Sapporo; Abashiri
- Stops: 17
- Distance travelled: 374.5 km (232.7 mi)
- Average journey time: 5 hours 30 minutes approx
- Service frequency: 2 return workings daily
- Lines used: Hakodate Main Line, Sōya Main Line, Sekihoku Main Line

On-board services
- Class: Standard
- Disabled access: Yes
- Sleeping arrangements: None
- Catering facilities: None
- Observation facilities: None
- Entertainment facilities: None
- Other facilities: Toilets

Technical
- Rolling stock: KiHa 283 series DMU
- Track gauge: 1,067 mm (3 ft 6 in)
- Electrification: None
- Operating speed: 110 km/h (68 mph)
- Track owner: JR Hokkaido
Route map

The Okhotsk (オホーツク, Ohōtsuku) is a limited express train service in Japan operated by the Hokkaido Railway Company (JR Hokkaido), which runs between Sapporo and Abashiri. There are two services per day running in both directions, with the journey time taking approximately 5 hours and 30 minutes. Trains operate at a maximum speed of 110 km/h (68 mph). It is named after the Sea of Okhotsk.

== Stops ==
Trains stop at the following stations:

Sapporo - Iwamizawa - (Bibai) - (Sunagawa) - Takikawa - Fukagawa - Asahikawa - Kamikawa - Shirataki - Maruseppu - Engaru - Ikutahara - Rubeshibe - Kitami - Bihoro - Memanbetsu - Abashiri

Stations in brackets () are stations where not all trains stop at.

- Okhotsk no. 2 does not stop at Sunagawa and Bibai.

== Rolling stock ==
Okhotsk services are normally formed of 3-car KiHa 283 series diesel multiple unit (DMU) trains, with monoclass passenger accommodation.

=== Formations ===
==== KiHa 183 series ====
Okhotsk services were previously formed of 4-car KiHa 183 series diesel multiple unit (DMU) trains as shown below, with car 1 at the Sapporo and Abashiri end (train reverses at Engaru Station). These trains were replaced by KiHa 283 series DMUs from 18 March 2023.

All cars were non-smoking.

Car No.	1	2		3		4
Accommodation	Non-reserved	Non-reserved	Reserved	Reserved	Green	Reserved

=== Past ===
- KiHa 22 DMUs (September 1959 – October 1961)
- KiHa 56 DMUs (October 1961 – October 1972)
- KiHa 80 DMUs (October 1972 – November 1986)
- KiHa 183 series DMUs (until March 2023)
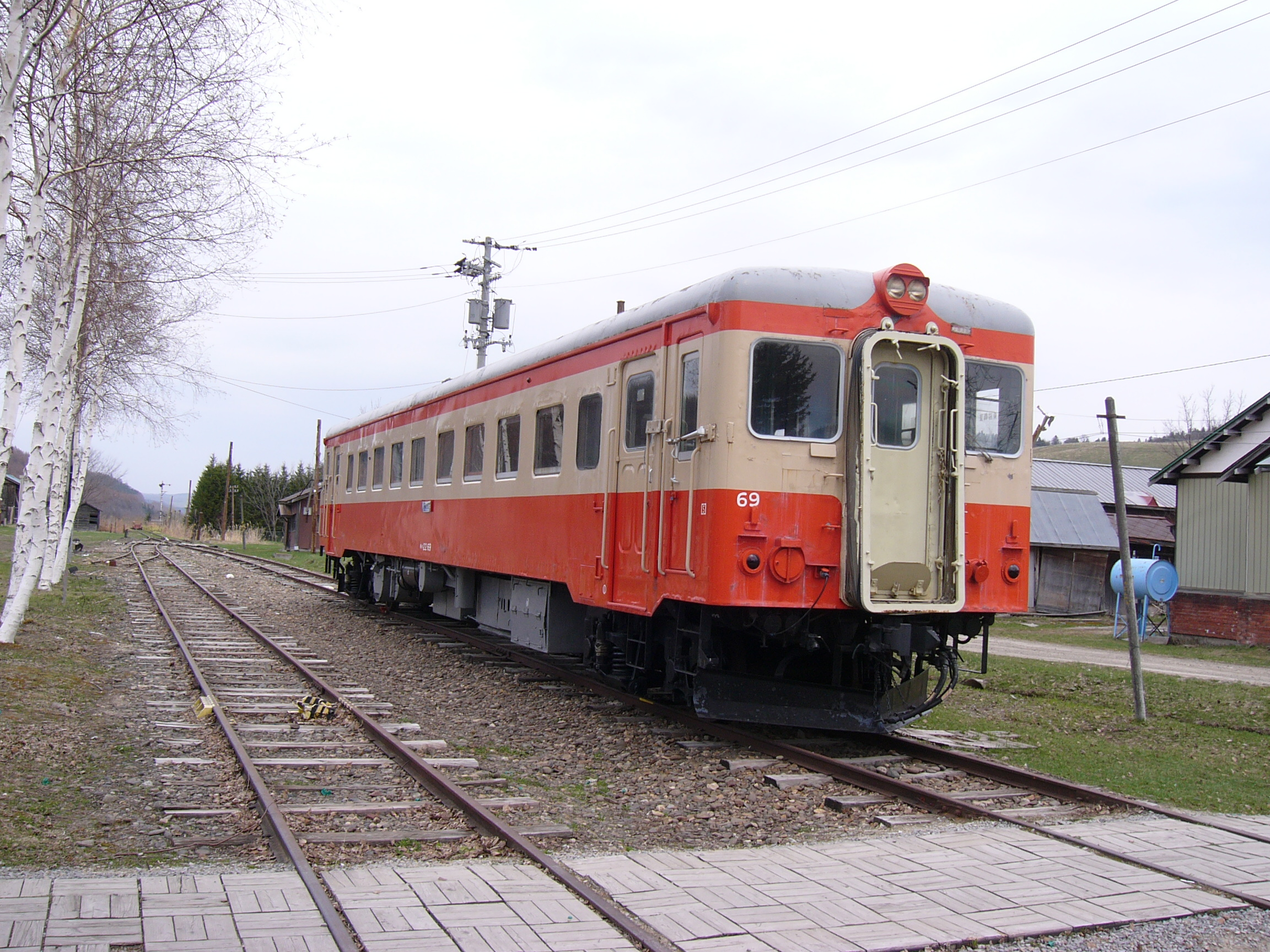
Preserved KiHa 22 DMU car, May 2005

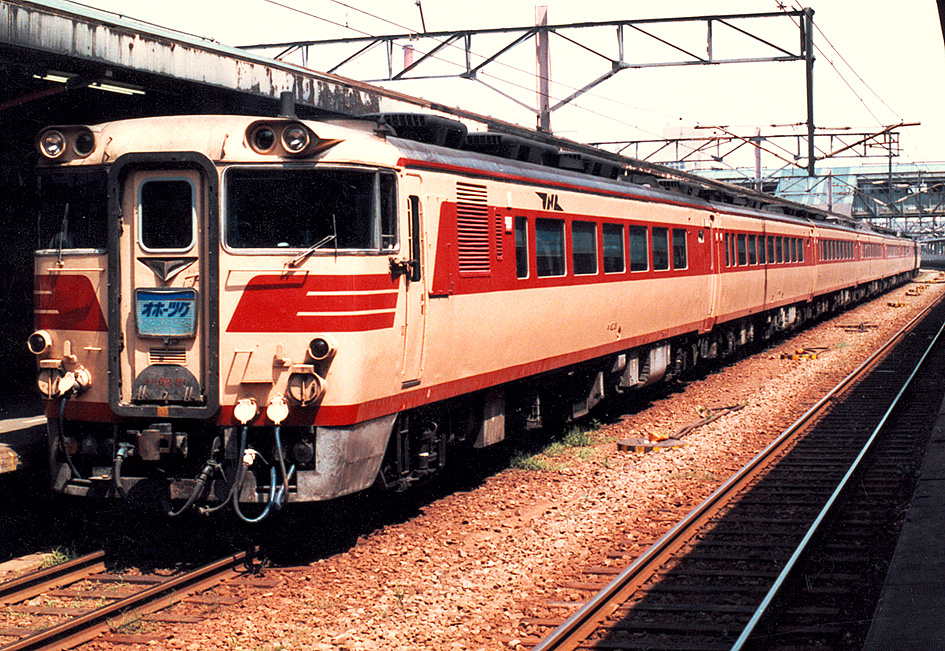
KiHa 80 series DMU on an Okhotsk service, 1986

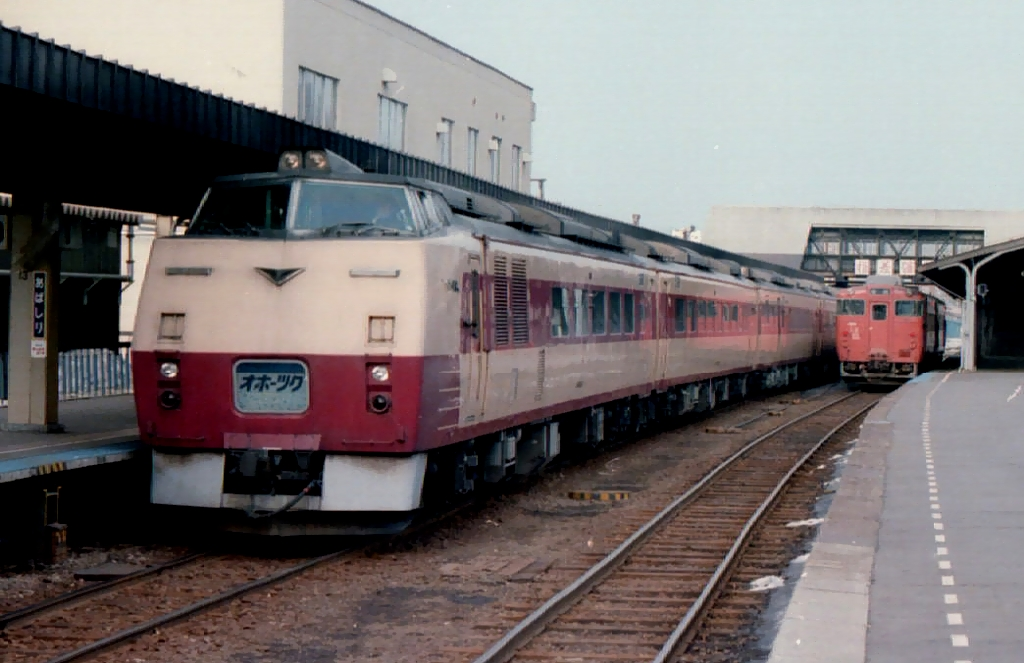
KiHa 183 series DMU in JNR livery, August 1985

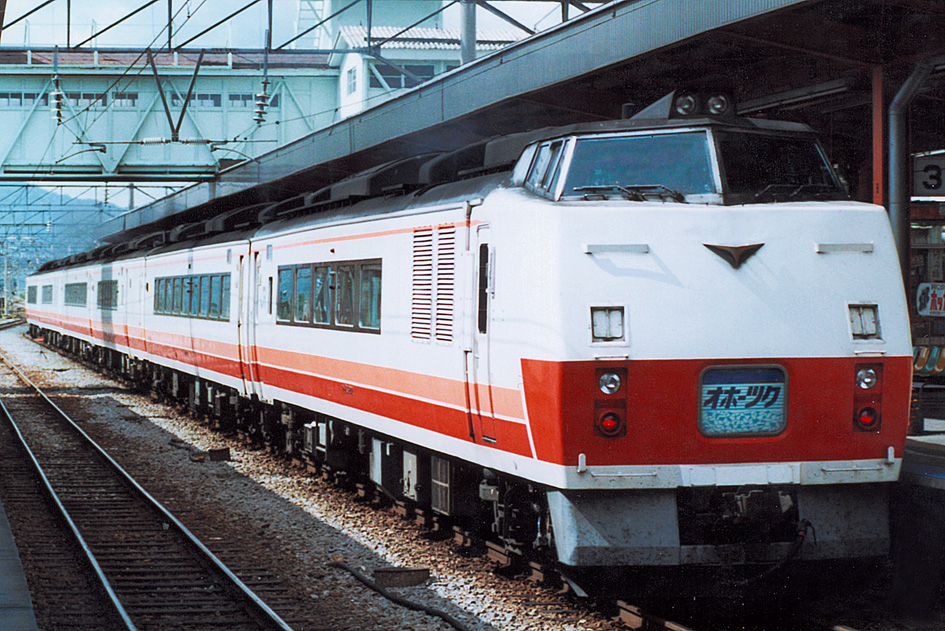
KiHa 183 series 6-car DMU in revised livery, 1990

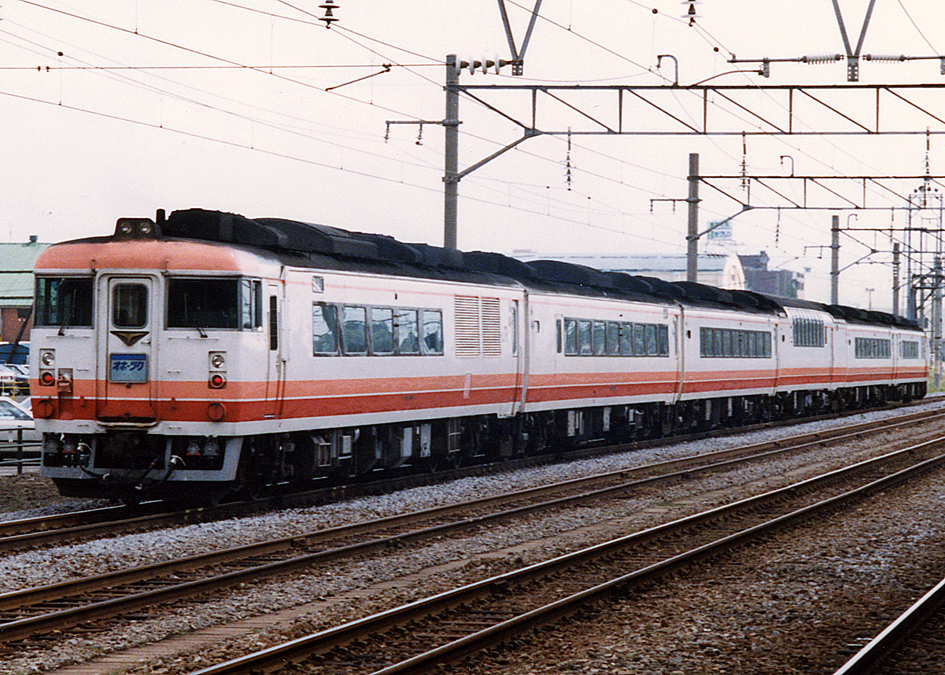
KiHa 183 series 6-car DMU in revised livery, 1990

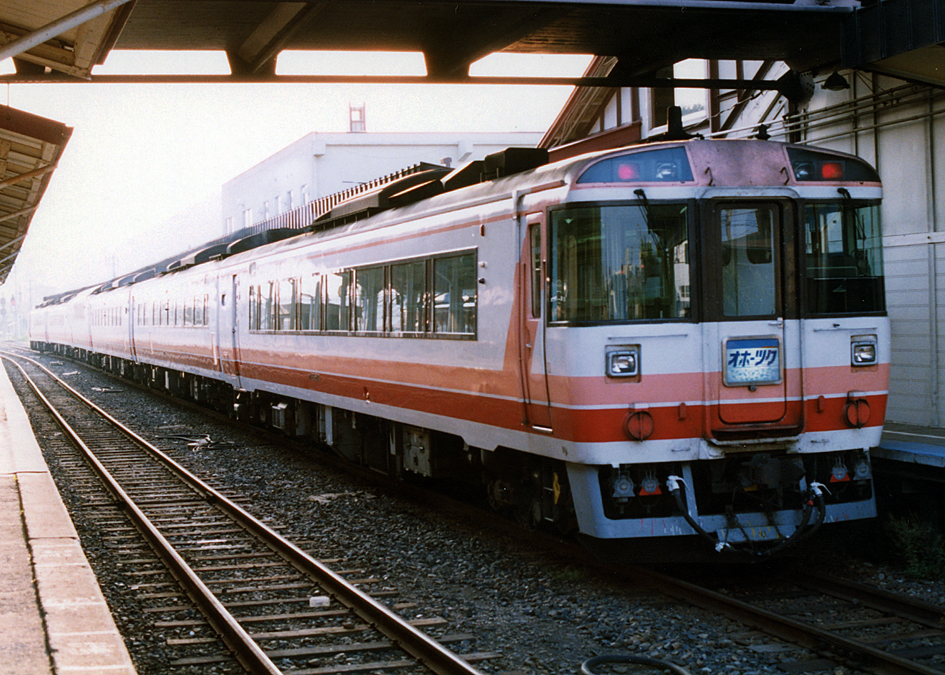
KiHa 183 series 6-car DMU in revised livery, 1990

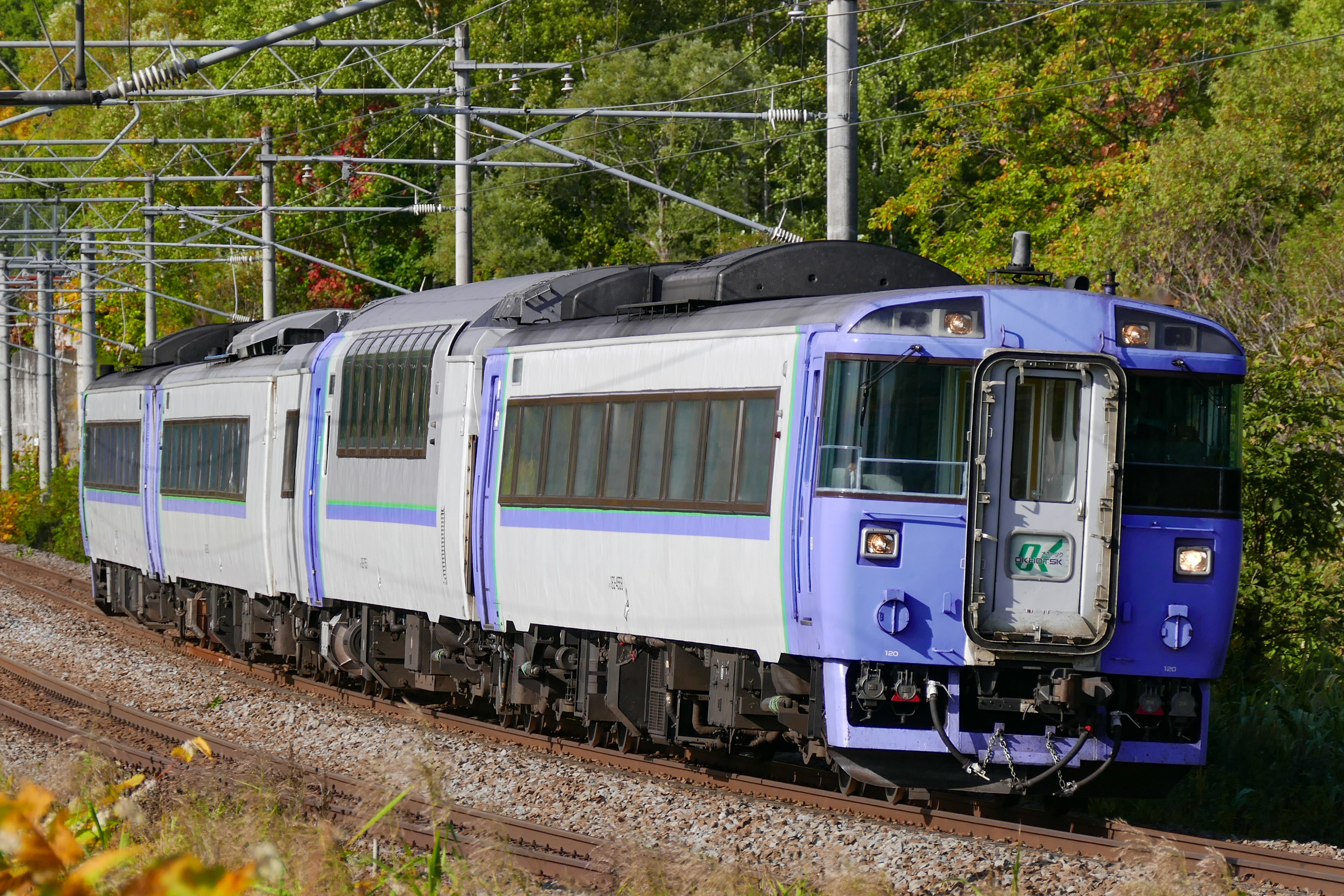
KiHa 183 series 4-car DMU in blue-and-white livery, September 2021

== History ==
The Okhotsk service was first introduced by Japanese National Railways from the start of the revised timetable on 22 September 1959, as a semi-express service operating between Asahikawa and Abashiri, using KiHa 22 2-car DMUs, with five return workings daily. From July 1960, services were extended to Sapporo, and ran coupled with Sōya semi express services over the Hakodate Main Line.

From the start of the revised timetable in October 1961, services were upgraded to "Express" status, and were operated using KiHa 56 4-car DMU formations, including a KiRo 26 Green (first class) car.

From the start of the revised timetable on 2 October 1972, services were upgraded to "Limited express" status, and were operated using KiHa 80 series DMU formations.

From the start of the revised timetable in November 1986, the KiHa 80 series rolling stock was replaced with KiHa 183 series 6-car DMUs.

=== Sleeper service ===
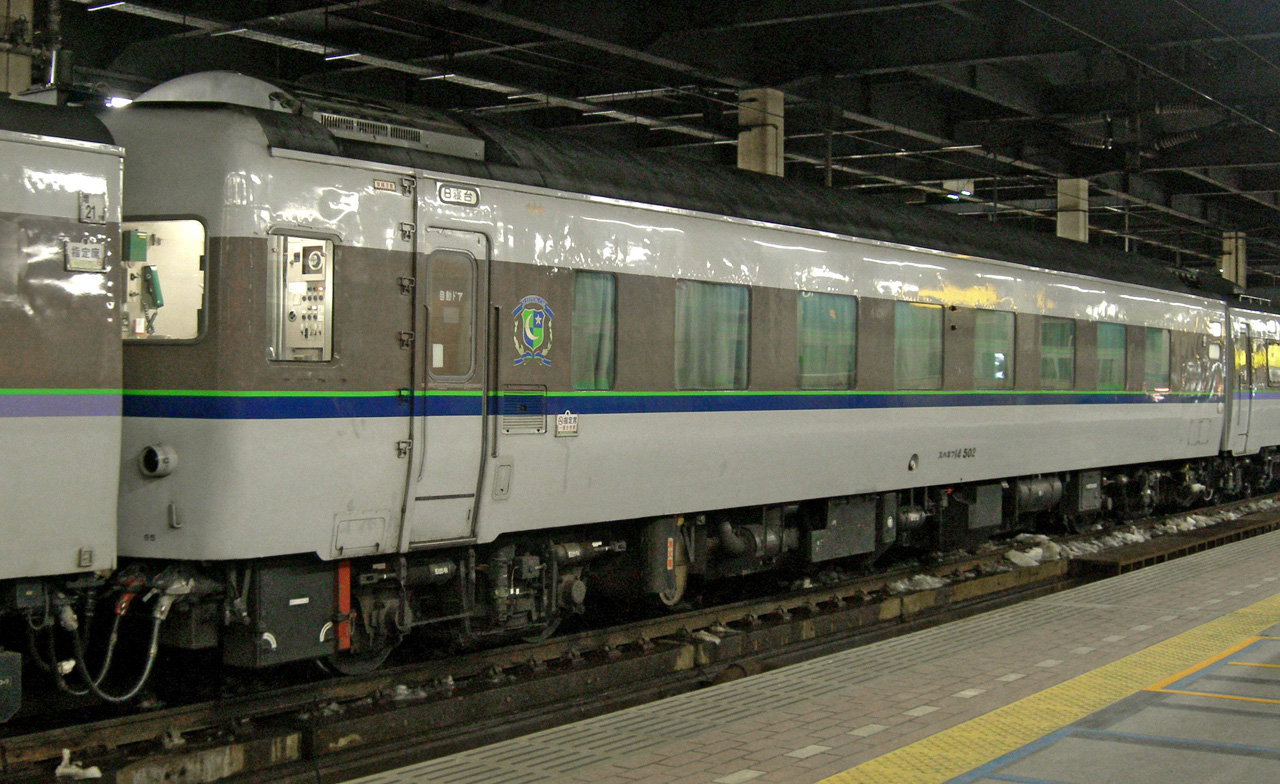
14 series sleeping car in an Okhotsk formation at Sapporo station, March 2008

From 1992, the former Taisetsu (大雪) express overnight sleeper service was integrated with the Okhotsk (becoming Okhotsk 9 & 10), featuring a SuHaNeFu 14-500 series sleeping car sandwiched in the DMU formation. From March 2006, this became a seasonal-only train (Okhotsk 81 & 82), and the overnight service was discontinued entirely from 16 March 2008.

==== Future plans ====
On 19 November 2025, JR Hokkaido announced that all non-reserved seating on Okhotsk services would be eliminated effective the next timetable revision, making all trains operate solely with reserved seating.

== SL Okhotsk ==
JR Hokkaido operates seasonal SL Okhotsk services formed of 14 series passenger coaches hauled by a JNR Class C11 steam locomotive and assisted by a JNR Class DE15 diesel locomotive.
