= Abashiri District =

District in Hokkaido, Japan

Coordinates: 43.73°N 144.13°E

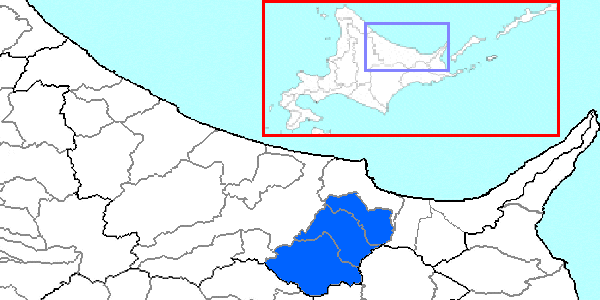
Location of Abashiri District in Okhotsk Subprefecture

Abashiri (網走郡, Abashiri-gun) is a district located in Okhotsk Subprefecture, Hokkaido, Japan.

As of April 2025, the district has an estimated population of 31,750 and a population density of 25.37 persons per km^{2} in 2004. The total area is 1,498.58 km^{2}.

Memanbetsu Airport is located in the town of Ōzora; the airport was located in the town of Memanbetsu prior to the town's 2006 merger into the town of Ōzora.

== Towns and villages ==
- Bihoro Town
- Ōzora Town (Previously Memanbetsu Town and Higashimokoto Village)
- Tsubetsu Town

== History ==
- 1869: 11 provinces and 86 districts were established in Hokkaido. Abashiri District was placed in Kitami Province
- July 1881: Abashiri District (網尻郡) was incorporated from Kushiro Province
- 1947: Abashiri Town split into Higashimokoto Village and Abashiri City; Abashiri City leaves the district
- March 31, 2006: the town of Memanbetsu, and the village of Higashimokoto merged to form the new town of Ōzora.
