= Memanbetsu Airport =

Memanbetsu Airport 女満別空港

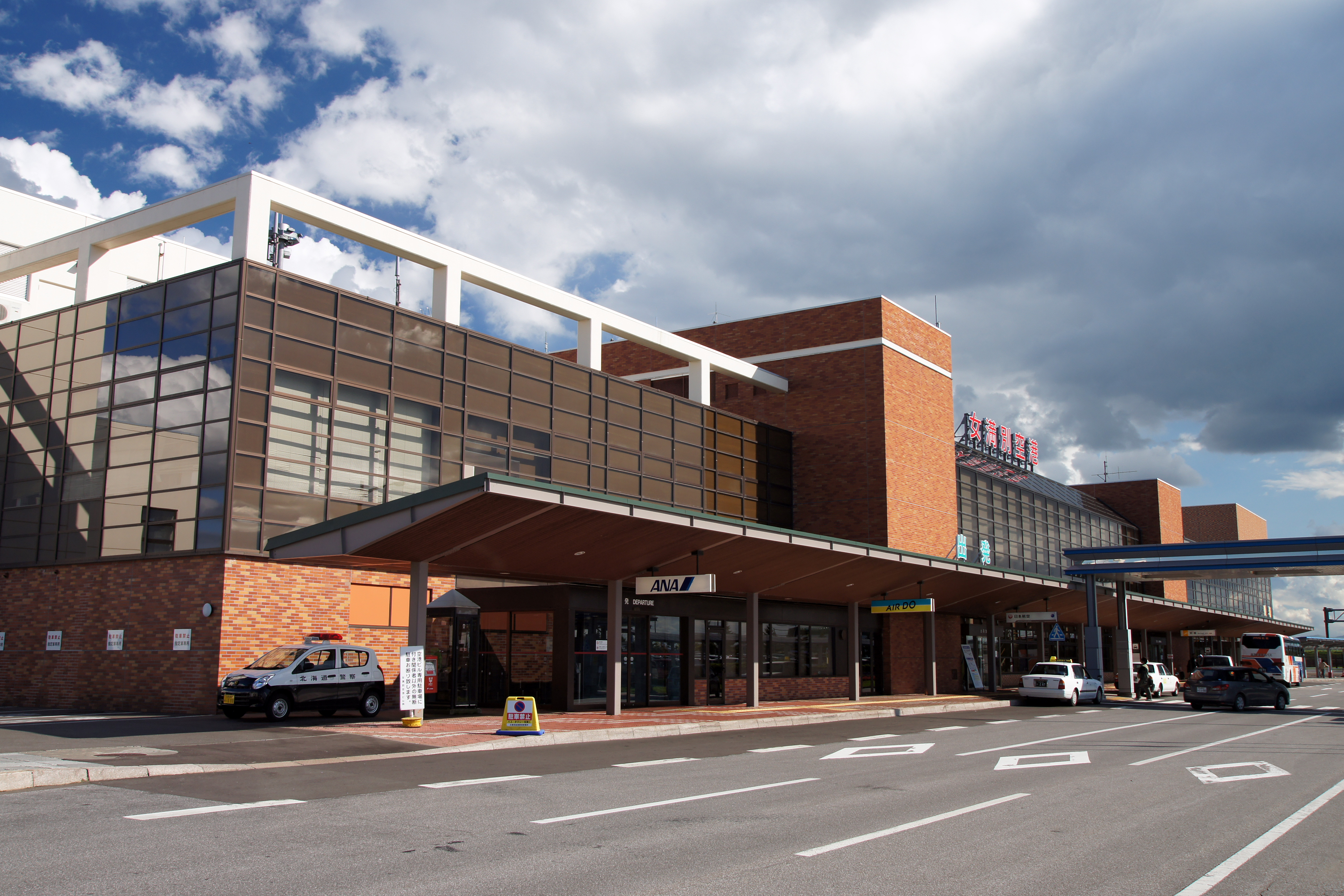
- IATA: MMB; ICAO: RJCM

Summary
- Airport type: Public
- Owner: Hokkaido Prefecture
- Operator: Hokkaido Airports
- Serves: Okhotsk Subprefecture
- Location: Memanbetsu, Ōzora, Hokkaido, Japan
- Opened: April 1985; 41 years ago
- Elevation AMSL: 109 ft (33 m)
- Coordinates: 43°52′50″N 144°09′51″E

Map
- Location in Hokkaidō Location in Japan

Runways
Direction	Length		Surface
Direction	m	ft	Surface
18/36	2,500	8,202	Asphalt

Statistics (2015)
- Passengers: 757,103
- Cargo (metric tonnes): 1,588
- Aircraft movement: 10,221
- Source: Japanese Ministry of Land, Infrastructure, Transport and Tourism

Memanbetsu Airport (女満別空港, Memanbetsu Kūkō) (IATA: MMB, ICAO: RJCM) is an airport in the Memanbetsu section of Ōzora, a town in Hokkaidō, Japan. The airport is close to Shiretoko National Park and consistently has over one million passengers per year.

== History ==
The current airfield was opened in April 1985, replacing the original Memanbetsu Airport closer to the current airport. The runway at the new airport was extended to its current length in 2000. The airport was located in the Town of Memanbetsu until 2006, when a merger consolidated Memanbetsu and the Village of Higashimokoto into the Town of Ōzora.

In 2011, the Hokkaido government announced that landing fees would be waived for international charter flights using the airport in an attempt to lure more overseas tourists to the region.

== Airlines and destinations ==
Airlines	Destinations
Hokkaido Air System	Sapporo–Okadama

== Ground transportation ==
=== Buses ===
Bus stop	Name	Via	Destination	Company	Note
1	Memanbetsu Airport Line	Memanbetsu Station・Yobito Station・Abashiri Prison・Abashiri Station	Abashiri Bus Terminal	Abashiri Bus	The bus routes are partly extended to Michi no Eki Abashiri (Aurora Terminal) when there are services of a ferry for drift ice during the winter
2	Memanbetsu Airport Line	Bihoro Koya (It takes 25 minutes from the bus stop to Bihoro Station)	Kitami Bus Terminal (Kitami Station (Hokkaido))	Hokkaidō Kitami Bus	
2	Memanbetsu Bihoro Line	Bihoro Station	Bihoro toge	Akan Bus	Runs only a part of season
3	Marimo Express		Lake Akan	Akan Bus	Timetable is unknown until announcement from Akan Bus.
4	Shiretoko Airport Liner	Abashiri Station・Shiretoko-Shari Station	Utoro Onsen Bus Terminal	Shari Bus and Abashiri Bus	Runs only a part of season

=== Trains ===
It takes 20 minutes from Airport Terminal to Nishi Memanbetsu Station.
