= Place names in Japan =

Japanese place names include names for geographic features, present and former administrative divisions, transportation facilities such as railroad stations, and historic sites in Japan. The article Japanese addressing system contains related information on postal addresses.

== Administrative level ==
Most place names are suffixed with its administrative division. These suffixes are often dropped in common usage when no ambiguity is likely. The suffixes are as follows:

- -ken (県) for a prefecture; e.g., Yamanashi-ken
- -to (都, lit. "capital"), prefecture-level region name unique to the capital Tōkyō-to
- -fu (府, lit. "office" or "area"), prefecture-level region (sometimes translated "urban prefecture") named so for historical reasons. There are now only two: Ōsaka-fu and Kyōto-fu. Tokyo-to was also classified as this before being reorganized.
- dō (道), an "administrative circuit", a semi-archaic administrative division formerly widespread. Modern usage is limited to Hokkaido, but terms like Tōkaidō (southern portion of eastern Japan) remains in common informal usage.

Because of the above four suffixes, the prefectures of Japan are commonly referred to as todōfuken (都道府県). Below the level of prefectures, there are:

- -gun (郡), a district composed of one or more machi or mura (see below), usually rural. The Japanese postal service and many other sources translate this as county.
- -shi (市), a city
- -ku (区), a ward of a city; e.g., Naka-ku in Hiroshima. The 23 special wards of Tokyo are separate local governments nearly equivalent to cities.
- -machi or -chō (町), a town; e.g. Fujikawaguchiko-machi - this can be a local government or a non-governmental division of a larger city
- -mura or -son (村), a village; e.g., Kamikuishiki-mura - this can also be a local government or a nongovernmental division of a larger city or town

These smaller administrative units are collectively referred to as shikuchōson (市区町村).

== Direction ==
Some names contain a word indicating a direction:

- chūō (中央) or naka- (中) - central; e.g., Yokosuka Chūō; Naka-Okachimachi
- higashi (東) - east; e.g., Higashi, Shibuya
- kita (北) - north; e.g., Kita-ku, literally meaning North Ward
- minami (南) - south
- nishi (西) - west
- u (右) ("right") and sa (左) ("left"), directions relative to the Kyōto Imperial Palace (and from the viewpoint of the Emperor, who faces south, so that sa is east and u is west): Sakyō-ku, Ukyō-ku
- kami or ue (上) ("upper") and shimo or shita (下) ("lower"); e.g., Shitamachi

== Relationship ==
Other names contain a word indicating the relationship of a settlement to another of the same or a similar name:

- hon or moto (本) - the original; e.g., Fuchu Honmachi; Moto Hachiōji
- shin (新) - new

== Geographic features ==
Geographic features figure prominently in Japanese place names. Some examples are

- hama (浜) for a beach; e.g. Hamamatsu
- hantō (半島) for a peninsula; e.g., Izu Hanto
- ishi (石) or iwa (岩) for a rock; e.g., Ishikawa Prefecture; Iwate Prefecture
- izumi (泉) for a spring; e.g., Hiraizumi, Iwate
- kaikyō (海峡) for a strait; e.g., Bungo Kaikyō
- kawa or -gawa (川 or 河) for a river; e.g., Asakawa
- ko (湖) for a lake; e.g., Biwa-ko, Kizaki-ko
- nada (灘) for a sea
- oka (岡) for a hill; e.g., Shizuoka Prefecture, Fukuoka
- saki (崎) or misaki (岬) for a promontory; e.g., Miyazaki city
- san or -zan (山) or yama for a mountain; e.g., Yamanashi Prefecture, Aso-san
- sawa or -zawa (沢) for a swamp; e.g., Mizusawa, Iwate
- shima or -jima (島) or tō for an island; e.g., Ie-shima, Iwo Jima, Okinawa Honto
- tani or -dani (谷) for a valley; e.g., Jigokudani, Mount Tate
- wan (湾) for a headland or bay; e.g., Sagami-wan

== Natural world ==
Other words that express the natural world or agriculture often appear in place names:

- ki or -gi (木) for a tree; e.g., Tochigi Prefecture
- matsu (松) for a pine tree; e.g. Takamatsu
- mori (森) for a forest; e.g., Aomori Prefecture
- sugi (杉) for a sugi tree; e.g., Suginami
- ta or -da (田) for a rice paddy; e.g. Ōda

== Former provinces ==
Names and parts of names of former provinces appear in many modern place names:

- Yamato: Yamato-Koriyama, a city in Nara Prefecture
- Hitachi: naka, a city in Ibaraki Prefecture
- Sagami River in Kanagawa Prefecture
- Tango: Tango Peninsula in Kyoto
- Chūetsu, part of Niigata Prefecture and location of the 2004 Chūetsu earthquake: its name incorporates a kanji from Echigo Province (as do many other place names in the region)

== Types of towns ==
Medieval Japan had many towns that fell into three categories: castle towns, post towns, harbor towns. In addition, the rise of commerce contributed to some place names. Here are some parts of names connected with medieval Japan:

- ichi (市), a market; e.g., Yokkaichi: "fourth-day market"
- -jō (城), a castle. Place names giving directions relative to a castle, such as Jōhoku (North of the Castle), Jōsai (West of the Castle) or Jōnan (South of the Castle), are common throughout Japan.
- minato (港) or tsu (津) for a harbor; e.g., Minato, Tokyo and Tsu, Mie
- shuku or -juku (宿), a post or station town on a traditional highway; e.g., Shinjuku

== Hokkaido ==
Many names in Hokkaido originated from words in the Ainu language. As people from mainland Japan conquered and colonized Hokkaido in the Edo period and the Meiji period, they transcribed Ainu placenames into Japanese using kanji chosen solely for their pronunciation. For example, the name Esashi comes from the Ainu word es a us i, meaning "cape". Some common Ainu elements in Hokkaido place names include:

Ainu original		Japanese transcription			Example placenames			Sources
Term	Meaning	Romaji	Kanji	Meaning of kanji	Japanese name	Ainu origin	Original meaning	Sources
pet	river	betsu	別	separate	Memanbetsu	meman pet	Cool river	
pet	river	betsu	別	separate	Monbetsu	mo pet	Quiet river	
ota	sand	uta	歌	song	Utanobori	ota nupuri	Sandy mountain	
ota	sand	uta	歌	song	Utashinai	ota us nay	River with a sandy beach	
nay	river	nai	内	inside	Wakkanai	yam wakka nay	Cold-water river	
nay	river	nai	内	inside	Horokanai	horka nay	River that goes back	
poro	large, many, much	horo, -poro	幌	canopy, horo (cloak)	Sapporo	sat poro pet	Dry, great river	
poro	large, many, much	horo, -poro	幌	canopy, horo (cloak)	Bihoro	pe poro	Much water	
sir	place, island, mountain	shiri	尻	buttocks	Okushiri	i kus un sir	Island over there	
sir	place, island, mountain	shiri	尻	buttocks	Rishiri	ri sir	Tall island	

Some other names come from places in other parts of Japan because in the past people migrated as a group to Hokkaido, and they give the new settlement a name reminiscent of their old home. Examples include Hiroshima and Date.

== Okinawa ==
Place names in Okinawa Prefecture are drawn from the traditional Ryukyuan languages. Many place names use the unique languages names, while other place names have both a method of reading the name in Japanese and a way to read the name in the traditional local language. The capital city Naha is Naafa in the Okinawan language. Uruma, which was incorporated in 2005, comes from an old name for the Okinawa Island meaning "coral island" and its name is written in hiragana rather than kanji. In Okinawan, nishi meant "north" rather than "west" as it does in standard Japanese, so Nishihara means "northern field" in respect to its position from the old Ryūkyū Kingdom capital at Shuri; in contrast, the Okinawan word for "west" is iri, which appears in the name of Iriomote-jima. Gusuku (城) meaning "castle" is also common in place names in Okinawa, found in Tomigusuku, Nakagusuku, and Kitanakagusuku, among others. Both Chatan and Yomitan turn tani (谷, "valley") into tan; Chatan also turns kita (北) into "cha" through the Okinawan language.

== Encyclopedias for Japanese place names ==
The following encyclopedias and dictionaries are major research tools for reading and understanding Japanese place names and histories.

=== Reading placenames ===
Shin Nihon chimei sakuin (新日本地名索引, 1993 New Index Gazetteer of Japan) Abokkusha. This is the most comprehensive dictionary for reading place names. Each entry simply lists the reading of place name, its kanji, location, and longitude-latitude coordinate.

=== Encyclopedias of Place Names ===
Dai Nihon Chimei Jisho (大日本地名辞書) is one of oldest, in 1907–1910, reprint and update version by 1971, published by Buzanbō (富山房). The main editor was Tōgo Yoshida (吉田 東伍, 1864-1918) written in vernacular expression in Meiji period with each entry includes the history and folklore for name.

Kadokawa Nihon chimei daijiten (角川日本地名大辞典) Kadokawa Shoten, published in the 1970s-1980s. This is the major encyclopedia for Japanese geographic reference. Each entry includes the history of the place, its population, major happenings, and major buildings such as schools, temples, and churches.

Konpakutoban Nihon chimei hyakka jiten (コンパクト版日本地名百科事典, Compact Land Japonica) Shogakukan in June 1998. This is the desktop dictionary for geographic reference. It is designed to be easily comprehensible. It includes color maps of Japan and detailed maps of major Japanese cities; Tokyo, Kyoto-shi, Nara-shi, Osaka-shi, and Nagoya-shi. The index for hard-to-read place names is included at the back of the dictionary.

=== Place Names in History ===
Kodai chimei daijiten (古代地名大辞典) Kadokawa Shoten. This work lists in gojuon order the place names of ancient Japanese history. The periods range from the Asuka period (飛鳥時代, Asuka-jidai, 538–710), Nara period (奈良時代, Nara-jidai, 710–794), and Heian period (平安時代, Heian-jidai, 710–1185). It especially focuses on the place names from the Man'yōshū (万葉集) and the Fudoki (風土記).

=== Origins of Place Names ===
Nihon chimei gogen jiten (日本地名語源事典) Shinjinbutsu oraisha. Based on the studies of geography and Japanese ancient words, each entry lists a few sentences about the origin and history of place names in gojuon order.

== See also ==
- List of Japanese prefectural name etymologies
- WikiProject Japan: Place names with unusual readings
- Japanese exonyms
