= Bihoro Station =

Railway station in Bihoro, Hokkaido, Japan

Coordinates: 43.8361°N 144.1058°E

Bihoro Station 美幌駅
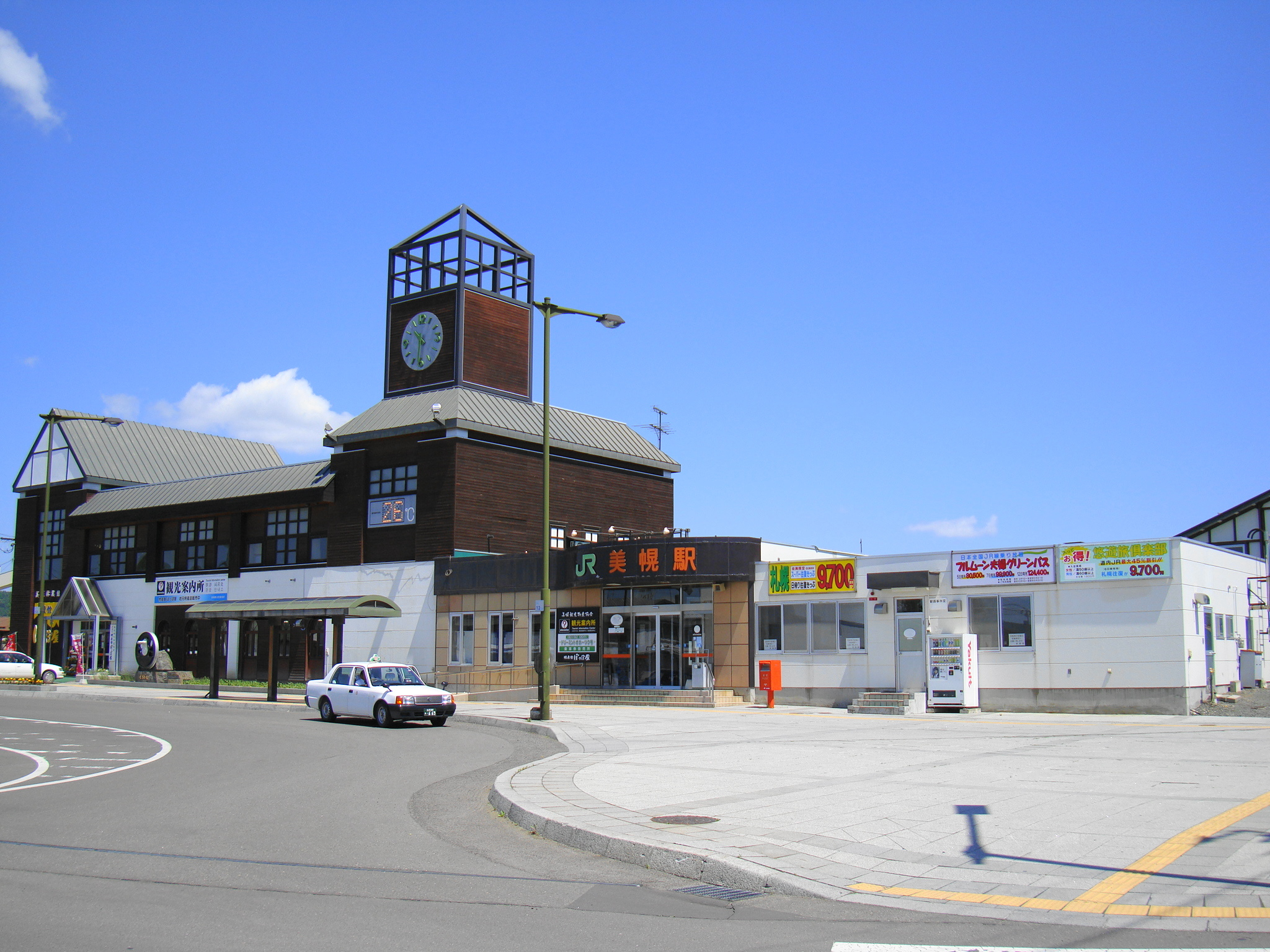
- Bihoro Station building in June 2009

General information
- Location: 3 Shinmachi, Bihoro, Abashiri, Hokkaido （北海道網走郡美幌町字新町3丁目） Japan
- Operator: JR Hokkaido
- Line: Sekihoku Main Line
- Connections: Bus terminal

Other information
- Station code: A65

History
- Opened: 1912
Location

Bihoro Station (美幌駅, Bihoro-eki) is a railway station on the Sekihoku Main Line in Bihoro, Hokkaido, Japan, operated by Hokkaido Railway Company (JR Hokkaido).

== Lines ==
Bihoro Station is served by the Sekihoku Main Line from Asahikawa to Abashiri, and lies 206.1 km (128.1 mi) from the official starting point of the line at Shin-Asahikawa. It is numbered "A65".

== Station layout ==
The station consists of one side platform and one island platform serving two tracks (platforms 2 and 3), as the track at the former platform 1 is no longer in place. The station building is connected to platforms 2 and 3 by a footbridge. The station has a "Midori no Madoguchi" staffed ticket office.

=== Platforms ===
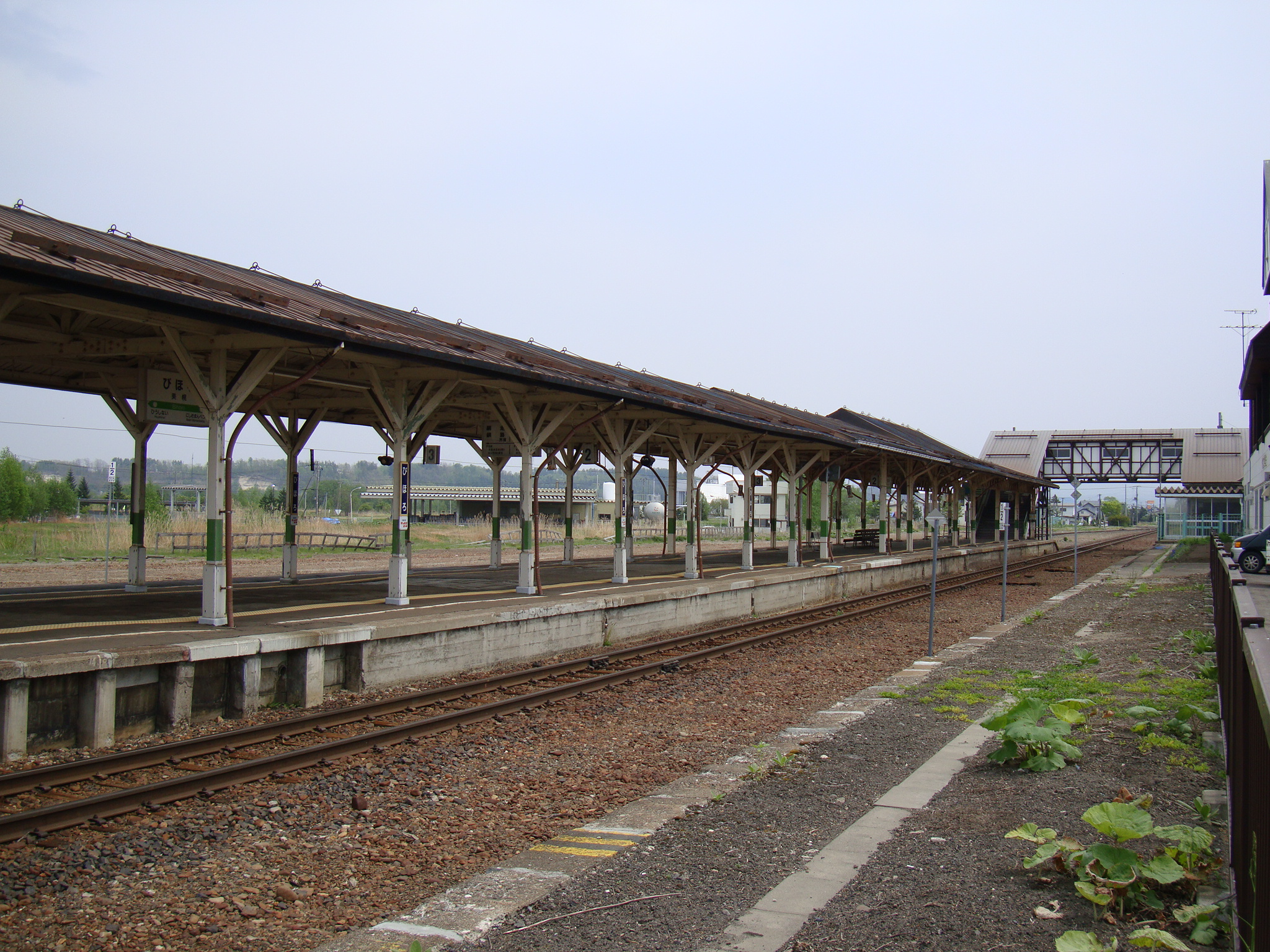
The station platforms in May 2009

2	■ Sekihoku Main Line	for Kitami, Asahikawa, and Sapporo
3	■ Sekihoku Main Line	for Memambetsu and Abashiri

== Adjacent stations ==
«	Service	»
Sekihoku Main Line
Kitami	Limited Express Okhotsk	Memambetsu
Kitami	Limited Express Taisetsu	Memanbetsu
Hiushinai	Local	Nishi-Memambetsu

== History ==
The station opened on 5 October 1912. With the privatization of Japanese National Railways (JNR) on 1 April 1987, the station came under the control of JR Hokkaido.

== Surrounding area ==
- National Route 39
- National Route 240
- National Route 243

== See also ==
- List of railway stations in Japan
