= Ōzora =

Ōzora 大空町
- Town
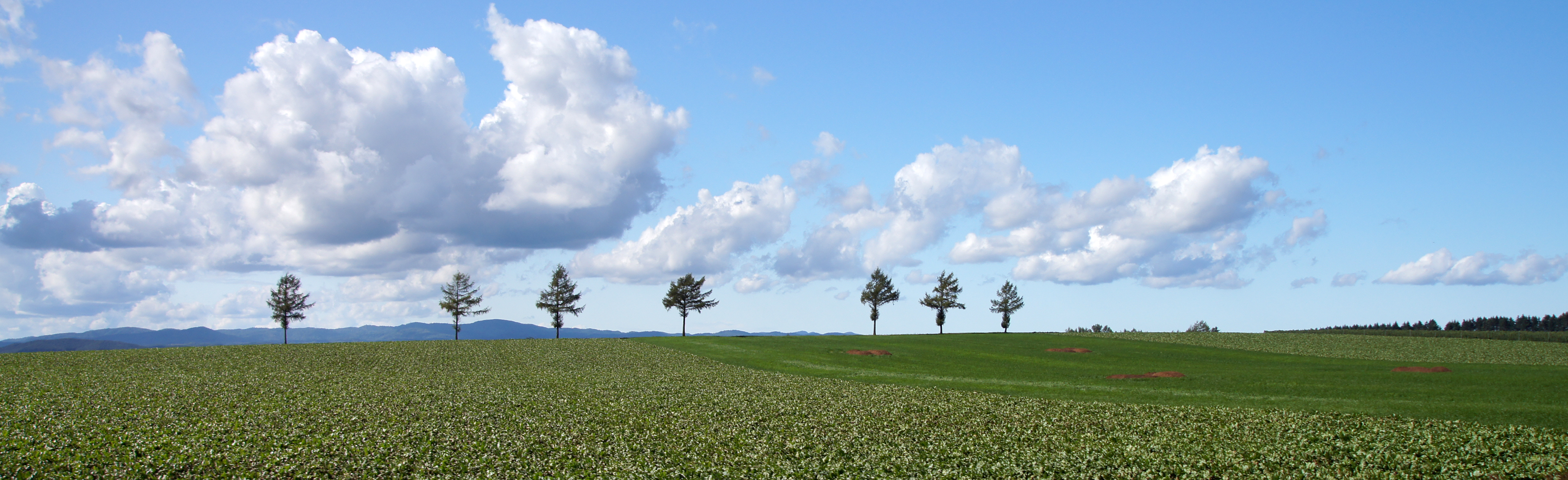

- Flag Chapter

- Location of Ōzora in Hokkaido (Okhotsk Subprefecture)

- Location in Japan
- Coordinates: 43°54′43″N 144°10′21.2″E
- Country: Japan
- Region: Hokkaido
- Prefecture: Hokkaido (Okhotsk Subprefecture)
- District: Abashiri

Government
  - Mayor: Kazumasa Matsukawa (April 2022)

Area
  - Total: 343.62 km^{2} (132.67 sq mi)

Population (2016-09-30)
  - Total: 7,430
  - Density: 21.6/km^{2} (56.0/sq mi)
- Time zone: UTC+09:00 (JST)
- City hall address: 3-4-1-1 Memanbetsu-nishi, Ōzora-chō, Hokkaidō; 099-2392
- Website: www.town.ozora.hokkaido.jp
- Symbols
- Flower: Mountain Phlox and Lysichite camtschatcense
- Mascot: Soralucky (そらっきー)
- Tree: Japanese Rowan and Japanese White Birch

Ōzora (大空町, Ōzora-chō) is a town located in Okhotsk Subprefecture, Hokkaido, Japan.

Ōzora was formed on March 31, 2006, as a result of the merger of the town of Memanbetsu, and the village of Higashimokoto.

Memanbetsu Village (later Memanbetsu Town) split from the Town of Abashiri (now the City of Abashiri) in 1921, and Higashimokoto Village split from Abashiri Town on February 11, 1947. Therefore, all of Ōzora's territory once was a part of Abashiri.

Many places in Ōzora, such as the train stations, the airport, and the high school are named after the former town of Memanbetsu, and Japanese airlines use "Memanbetsu" to refer to "Ōzora" as a destination.

== Education ==
Ōzora operates public elementary and junior high schools.

In the Higashimokoto area:

- Higashimokoto Agricultural High School
- Higashimokoto Elementary School
- Higashimokoto Junior High School

In the Memanbetsu area:

- Memanbetsu Elementary School
- Memanbetsu Junior High School

Hokkaido Prefectural Board of Education operates Memanbetsu High School in Ōzora.

== Transportation ==
Hokkaido Railway Company (JR Hokkaido) operates two stations on the Sekihoku Main Line:

- Memambetsu Station
- Nishi-Memambetsu Station

Memanbetsu Airport is located in Ōzora.

== Mascot ==
Soralucky, the town's mascot

Ōzora's mascot is Soralucky (そらっきー, Sorakki), a cute anthropomorphic jet airliner. It was designed in 2006, unveiled in March 2007 and it was further revised in December 2014 with addition of jet engines, windows and other miscellaneous details such as the town emblem on its tail.
