= Japanese exonyms =

Japanese exonyms are the names of places in the Japanese language that differ from the name given in the place's dominant language.

While Japanese names of places that are not derived from the Chinese language generally tend to represent the endonym or the English exonym as phonetically accurately as possible, the Japanese terms for some place names are obscured, either because the name was borrowed from another language or because of some other obscure etymology, such as referring to England (more specifically the United Kingdom) as イギリス (Igirisu), which is based on the Portuguese term for "English", Inglês. Exonyms for cities outside of the East Asian cultural sphere tend to be more phonetically accurate to their endonyms than the English exonyms if the endonym is significantly different from the English exonym.

The names for nations and cities that existed before major Japanese orthographic reforms in the Meiji era usually have ateji, or kanji characters used solely to represent pronunciation. However, the use of ateji today has become far less common, as katakana has largely taken over the role of phonetically representing words of non-Sino-Japanese origin. As significant differences exist between the pronunciations of the Chinese and Japanese languages, many of the ateji terms for the exonyms of foreign, non-Sinitic terms are unrecognizable in Chinese, and likewise, since some of the ateji terms derived from Chinese, the aforementioned terms do not match the Japanese on or kun readings for the pronunciation of the given kanji.

Legend
†	Archaic, obsolete
‡	Rare
–	Does not exist
( ✗)	Does not exist, but kept on list for linguistic interest, or to prevent common errors.

== Based on endonyms ==
English	Japanese			Endonym		Notes
English	Kana	Ateji	Romanized	Name	Language	Notes
Afghanistan	アフガニスタン		Afuganisutan	افغانستان (Afğānistān)	Dari, Pashto	
South Africa	南アフリカ		Minami Afurika	South Africa	English	Abbreviated 南ア (Nan'a)
Australia	オーストラリア	濠太剌利	Ōsutoraria	Australia	English	Also 豪州 (Gōshū)
Brazil	ブラジル	伯剌西爾	Burajiru	Brasil	Portuguese	
Buenos Aires	ブエノスアイレス		Buenosuairesu	Buenos Aires	Spanish	Abbreviated ブ市 (Bushi) (市 means 'city')
Germany	ドイツ	独逸	Doitsu	Deutschland	German	
Indonesia	インドネシア	印度尼西亜	Indoneshia	Indonesia	Indonesian	
Ireland	アイルランド	愛蘭	Airurando	Ireland	English	
Israel	イスラエル	以色列	Isuraeru	ישראל (Yīsrāʾēl)	Hebrew	
Italy	イタリア	伊太利	Itaria	Italia	Italian	
Italy	イタリア	伊太利亜	Itaria	Italia	Italian	
Liechtenstein	リヒテンシュタイン		Rihitenshutain	Liechtenstein	German	
London	ロンドン	倫敦	Rondon	London	English	
Myanmar	ミャンマー		Myanmā	မြန်မာ (Mranma)	Burmese	Also ビルマ (Biruma) and 緬甸 (Menden)
New Zealand	ニュージーランド		Nyūjīrando	New Zealand	English	
Pakistan	パキスタン	巴基斯坦	Pakisutan	پاكستان (Pākistān)	Urdu	
Portugal	ポルトガル	葡萄牙	Porutogaru	Portugal	Portuguese	
Russia	ロシア	露西亜	Roshia	Россия (Rossija)	Russian	Abbreviated 露国 (Rokoku) (国 means 'country')
San Francisco	サンフランシスコ		Sanfuranshisuko	San Francisco	English	Also 桑港 (Sōkō)
Seoul	ソウル		Souru	서울 (Seoul)	Korean	Also 京城 (Keijō)
Switzerland	スイス	瑞西	Suisu	Suisse	French	
Switzerland	スイス		Suisu	Schweiz	German	
Thailand	タイ	泰	Tai	ประเทศไทย (Prathet Thai)	Thai	
United Arab Emirates	アラブ首長国連邦		Arabu Shuchōkoku Renpō	الإمارات العربية المتحدة (al-ʾImārāt al-ʿArabiyya al-Muttaḥida)	Arabic	首長国 (shuchōkoku) means 'emirate', and 連邦 (renpō) means 'union'.
United States of America	アメリカ	亜米利加	Amerika	United States of America	English	Abbreviated 米国 (Beikoku) (国 means 'country'). See also 合衆国 (Gasshūkoku)
Washington, D.C.	ワシントン	華盛頓	Washinton	Washington, D.C.	English	Abbreviated 華府 (Kafu) (府 means 'urban prefecture')

== Based on English exonyms ==
English	Japanese			Endonym		Notes
English	Kana	Ateji	Romanized	Name	Language	Notes
Algeria	アルジェリア		Arujeria	الجزائر (al-Jazāʾir)	Arabic	
Algeria	アルジェリア		Arujeria	Dzayer	Berber	
Argentina	アルゼンチン	亜爾然丁	Aruzenchin	Argentina	Spanish	
Austria	オーストリア	墺太利	Ōsutoria	Österreich	German	
Cambodia	カンボジア	柬埔寨	Kanbojia	កម្ពុជា (Kampuchea)	Khmer	
Czech Republic	チェコ		Cheko	Česko	Czech	From English Czechoslovakia
Denmark	デンマーク	丁抹	Denmāku	Danmark	Danish	
Egypt	エジプト	埃及	Ejiputo	مصر (Miṣr)	Arabic	
Iceland	アイスランド	愛斯蘭	Aisurando	Ísland	Icelandic	Also 氷島 (Hyōtō)
Laos	ラオス	羅宇	Raosu	ລາວ (Lao)	Lao	
Laos	ラオス	老檛	Raosu	ລາວ (Lao)	Lao	
Malaysia	マレーシア	馬来西亜	Marēshia	Malaysia	Malay	
Mexico	メキシコ	墨西哥	Mekishiko	México	Spanish	
Norway	ノルウェー	諾威	Noruwē	Noreg	Norwegian	
Philippines	フィリピン	比律賓	Firipin	Pilipinas	Filipino	Abbreviated 比島 (Hitō) (島 means 'island')
Poland	ポーランド	波蘭	Pōrando	Polska	Polish	
Saudi Arabia	サウジアラビア		Saujiarabia	ٱلسعودية (as-Suʿūdiyya)	Arabic	
Spain	スペイン	西班牙	Supēn	España	Spanish	
Sweden	スウェーデン	瑞典	Suwēden	Sverige	Swedish	

== Based on Chinese names ==
For place names derived from the Chinese language, Japanese typically uses the kanji equivalents of the Chinese characters that make up their respective endonyms, albeit with a Sino-Japanese pronunciation called on'yomi. Some place names, however, also have an approximate pronunciation (or transcription) of a historical English exonym if the area is internationally well-known, such as Beijing and Hong Kong, and such transcriptions tend to be more common than the on'yomi or the Mandarin transcriptions. Most place names derived from Mandarin also have a Japanese transcription of the Mandarin pronunciation.

One detail to be noted, however, is that for the names of certain districts or areas in Hong Kong and Macau, the pronunciations of the Japanese transcriptions typically try to imitate the Cantonese pronunciation instead of the Mandarin pronunciation.

Most Korean place names are also derived from words in the Chinese language, though Japanese can refer to a Korean place name using either Japanese on-yomi or a pronunciation that imitates the Korean endonym name as closely as possible (Itaewon (梨泰院) is Ritai'in (りたいいん) or Itewon (イテウォン) in Japanese). Many place names in Korea have at least two of the pronunciations, the first being based on the Japanese on-yomi or kun-yomi and the second being based on the Korean endonym, with the latter being made so that the Japanese could navigate and ask for directions more clearly to native Koreans. Korean-based pronunciations are usually written in katakana.

The Chinese characters for the endonyms below are kanji shinjitai, which may differ from the simplified Chinese characters used in China. Most can be written either in kanji or katakana.

English	Japanese			Mandarin	Endonym	Notes
English	Kanji	On'yomi	Not On'yomi	Pinyin	Endonym	Notes
Beijing, Peking	北京	✗ Hokkyō	Pekin	Běijīng		Pronunciation based on historical English exonym
Beijing, Peking	北京	✗ Hokkyō	Hokkin†	Běijīng		
Busan	釜山	Fuzan	Pusan	Fǔshān	Korean: 부산, romanized: Busan	
China	中国	Chūgoku		Zhōngguó		
Philippines	比律賓		Firipin	Fēilǜbīn	Filipino: Pilipinas	
Guangdong, Canton	広東	✗ Kōtō	Kanton	Guǎngdōng	Yue Chinese: Gwong2dung1	Pronunciation based on historical English exonym
Harbin	哈爾浜, 哈爾賓		Harubin	Hā'ěrbīn	Russian: Харбин, romanized: Kharbin, Manchu: ᡥᠠᠯᠪᡳᠨ, romanized: Halbin	
Harbin	哈爾浜, 哈爾賓		Harupin	Hā'ěrbīn	Russian: Харбин, romanized: Kharbin, Manchu: ᡥᠠᠯᠪᡳᠨ, romanized: Halbin	
Hong Kong	香港	✗ Kōkō	Honkon	Xiānggǎng	Yue Chinese: Hoeng1gong2	Pronunciation based on English exonym
India	印度	Indo	—N/a	Yìndù	Hindi: भारत, romanized: Bhārat	Usually written with katakana
North Korea	北朝鮮	Kita Chōsen	—N/a	Běi Cháoxiǎn	Korean: 북조선, romanized: Bukjoseon	北 (kita) means 'north'.
South Korea	韓国	Kankoku	—N/a	Hánguó	Korean: 한국, romanized: Han'guk	
Macau	澳門	Ōmon	Makao	Àomén	Yue Chinese: Ou3mun2	Pronunciation based on Portuguese exonym
Myanmar	緬甸†	Menden	—N/a	Miǎndiàn	Burmese: မြန်မာ, romanized: Mranma	Also ビルマ (Biruma) and ミャンマー (Myanmā)
Nanjing, Nanking	南京	✗ Nankyō	Nankin	Nánjīng		Pronunciation based on historical English exonym
Oxford	牛津		Okkusufōdo	Niújīn	牛 means 'ox' and 津 means 'ford' in Chinese.	
Pyongyang	平壌	Heijō‡	Pyon'yan	Píngrǎng	Korean: 평양, romanized: P'yŏngyang	
Shanghai	上海	Jōkai†	Shanhai	Shànghǎi	Wu Chinese: Zaan22 he44	
Shenzhen	深圳	Shinsen	Shenchen‡	Shēnzhèn		
Tai Po	大埔	Taiho	Taipō	Dàpǔ	Yue Chinese: Daai6bou3	Based on Cantonese pronunciation
Taipei	台北	Taihoku	Taipei	Táiběi		
Taiwan	台湾	Taiwan	—N/a	Táiwān		
Tibet	西蔵	Seizō	Chibetto	Xīzàng	Standard Tibetan: བོད, romanized: Bod	Pronunciation based on the English exonym
Ürümqi	烏魯木斉		Urumuchi	Wūlǔmùqí	Uyghur: ئۈرۈمچى, romanized: Ürümçi	
Vietnam	越南	Etsunan‡	Betonamu	Yuènán	Vietnamese: Việt Nam	
Yangtze	長江	Chōkō	Changawa‡	Cháng Jiāng		
Yangtze	揚子江	✗ Yōshikō	Yōsukō	Yángzǐ Jiāng		

== Other ==
English	Japanese name			Endonym		Notes
English	Kana	Ateji	Romanized	Name	Language	Notes
Australia	ごうしゅう	豪州	Gōshū	Australia	English	豪 is derived from the 濠 in 濠太剌利 (Ōsutoraria), and 州 means 'continent'.
Chile	チリ	智利†	Chiri	Chile	Spanish	From Portuguese Chile
Chile	チリー†		Chirī	Chile	Spanish	From Portuguese Chile
Greece	ギリシャ	希臘	Girisha	Ελλάδα (Elláda)	Greek	From Portuguese Grécia
Hollywood	ハリウッド	聖林	Hariuddo	Hollywood	English	
Hollywood	しょうりん‡	聖林	Shōrin	Hollywood	English	Literally 'holy woods'
Iceland	ひょうとう	氷島	Hyōtō	Ísland	Icelandic	Literally 'ice island'. See also アイスランド (Aisurando).
Kaohsiung	カオシュン	高雄	Kaoshun	高雄 (Gāoxióng)	Mandarin	
Kaohsiung	たかお	高雄	Takao	高雄 (Gāoxióng)	Mandarin	From the Siraya name for the city.
Kazakhstan	カザフスタン		Kazafusutan	Қазақстан (Qazaqstan)	Kazakh	From Russian Казахстан (Kazakhstan)
Los Angeles	らふ†	羅府†	Rafu	Los Angeles	English	Abbreviation of outdated Chinese 羅省技利 (Luóshěngjìlì) (府 means 'urban prefecture')
Myanmar	ビルマ		Biruma	မြန်မာ (Mranma)	Burmese	From Dutch or German Birma. See also ミャンマー (Myanmā) and 緬甸 (Menden).
Netherlands	オランダ	阿蘭陀	Oranda	Nederland	Dutch	From Portuguese Holanda ('Holland')
Netherlands	オランダ	和蘭	Oranda	Nederland	Dutch	From Portuguese Holanda ('Holland')
Sakhalin	からふと	樺太	Karafuto	Сахалин (Sakhalin)	Russian	
San Francisco	そうこう‡	桑港‡	Sōkō	San Francisco	English	Also サンフランシスコ (Sanfuranshisuko)
Seoul	けいじょう	京城	Keijō	서울 (Seoul)	Korean	Literally means 'capital city'. See also ソウル (Souru).
Turkey	トルコ	土耳古	Toruko	Türkiye	Turkish	From Portuguese turco
United Kingdom	イギリス	英吉利	Igirisu	United Kingdom	English	From Portuguese inglês
United Kingdom	エゲレス	英吉利	Egeresu	United Kingdom	English	From Dutch Engels
United Kingdom	れんごうおうこく	連合王国	Rengō Ōkoku	United Kingdom	English	連合 means 'union' and 王国 means 'kingdom'.
United States of America	がっしゅうこく	合衆国	Gasshūkoku	United States of America	English	Literally means 'federation'. See also アメリカ (Amerika).
Yuzhno-Sakhalinsk	とよはら	豊原	Toyohara	Южно-Сахалинск (Yuzhno-Sakhalin)	Russian	

== See also ==
- Endonym and exonym
- Names of Asian cities in different languages
- Japanese place names
- List of Japanese prefectural name etymologies
