= List of Japanese prefectural name etymologies =

Prefecture 都道府県 Todōfuken
- Location: Japan
- Number: 47

The 47 prefectures of Japan, which form the first level of jurisdiction and administrative division of Japan, consist of 43 prefectures (県, ken) proper, two urban prefectures (府, fu; Osaka, and Kyoto), one "circuit" or "territory" (道, dō; Hokkaido) and one "metropolis" (都, to; Tokyo). The Meiji Fuhanken sanchisei administration created the first prefectures to replace the provinces of Japan in 1868.

== List of prefectures ==
The following list contains the etymology of each current prefecture. The default alphabetic order in this sortable table can be altered to mirror the traditional Japanese regions and ISO parsing.

Prefecture	Kanji	origin and meaning of name
Aichi	愛知県	Aichi-ken (愛知県) means "love knowledge". In the third volume of the Man'yōshū there is a poem by Takechi Kurohito that reads: "The cry of the crane, calling to Sakurada; it sounds like the tide, draining from Ayuchi flats, hearing the crane cry". Ayuchi is the original form of the name Aichi, and the Fujimae tidal flat, now a protected area, is all that remains of the earlier Ayuchi-gata. It became Aichi (愛知)→ love knowledge.
Akita	秋田県	Akita-ken (秋田県) means "autumn rice paddy". It was aita or akita, meaning wetland, good place for a rice crop.
Aomori	青森県	Aomori-ken (青森県) means "green forest" or "green hill". According to records from the mid-17th century, Aomori city was named after a mori (森) around 3 meters high that was green all-year. Mori (森) has the meaning of "forest" in standard Japanese, but it has been argued by Kudou Daisuke that it is used in its dialectal meaning of "hill".
Chiba	千葉県	Chiba-ken (千葉県) The name of Chiba Prefecture in Japanese is formed from two kanji characters. The first, 千 (chi), means "thousand" and the second, 葉 (ba) means "leaves". The name first appears as an ancient kuni no miyatsuko, or regional command office, as the Chiba Kuni no Miyatsuko (千葉国造). The name was adopted by a branch of the Taira clan, which moved to the area in present-day Chiba City in the late Heian period. The branch of the Taira adopted the name and became the Chiba clan, and held strong influence over the area of the prefecture until the Azuchi–Momoyama period. The name "Chiba" was chosen for the prefecture at the time of its creation in 1873 by the Assembly of Prefectural Governors (地方官会議 Chihōkan Kaigi), an early Meiji-period body of prefectural governors that met to decide the structure of local and regional administration in Japan.千葉→thousand leaves, hapa became ba and refers to kudzu, which is used like corn starch and can be eaten as sweets.
Ehime	愛媛県	Ehime-ken (愛媛県) – The name Ehime comes from the Kojiki, when Izanagi and Izanami-no-Mikoto created Shikoku as the goddess Iyo, and means "beautiful maiden" (愛媛).
Fukui	福井県	Fukui-ken (福井県) means a "good luck well". Shibata Katsune named the area in honor of Matsudaira Hideyasu in 1601 as "luck staying here" fuku ga iru, later changed to Fukui (福井) → good luck well.
Fukuoka	福岡県	Fukuoka-ken (福岡県) - After the Battle of Sekigahara in 1600, Kuroda Nagamasa came from Okayama and built a castle named after a shrine in his hometown (福岡)→ good luck hill.
Fukushima	福島県	Fukushima-ken (福島県) means "good fortune island". Strong winds blow (kaze ga fuku) against Mount Shinobu in the center of Fukushima, which became 福島 (good luck-island).
Gifu	岐阜県	Gifu-ken (岐阜県) was named by Oda Nobunaga in 1567 after he conquered the region and made Gifu Castle his headquarters and residence. The name was derived from an ancient Chinese poem. The first character comes from Qishan (岐山), a legendary mountain, capital of the Zhou Kingdom, from which most of China was unified; the second character comes from Qufu (曲阜), the birthplace of Confucius. Gifu (岐阜)→ can be read as forked road-mound.
Gunma	群馬県	Gunma-ken (群馬県) means "herd of horses". Ancient Gunma was a center of horse trading and breeding, as well as stables for the emperor. (群馬)→herd of horses.
Hiroshima	広島県	Hiroshima-ken (広島県) - From the original many islands it became hiroi hiroku atsumeru "collect all islands" but now reads (広島)→wide-island.
Hokkaidō	北海道	Hokkaido (北海道) means "North Sea Road" or "North Sea Circuit". The island has gone by the names of Ezo, Yezo, Yeso or Yesso in the past. During the Nara and Heian periods (710–1185), people in Hokkaido conducted trade with Dewa Province, an outpost of the Japanese central government. From the Middle Ages, the people in Hokkaido began to be called Ezo. Around the same time Hokkaido came to be called Ezochi (蝦夷地, literally "Ezo-land") or Ezogashima (蝦夷ヶ島, literally "Island of the Ezo"). The Ezo mainly relied upon hunting and fishing and obtained rice and iron through trade with the Japanese. When establishing the Development Commission (開拓使 Kaitakushi), the Meiji Government introduced a new name. After exploration, Takeshiro Matsuura chose the name, and in 1869, the northern Japanese island became known as Hokkaido.
Hyōgo	兵庫県	Hyōgo-ken (兵庫県) – This was the location of the government arsenal, in Japanese shako, changed to kyo no ko, and finally to Hyogo (兵庫)→military-storehouse.
Ibaraki	茨城県	Ibaraki-ken (茨城県) means "thorn bush castle". The first character is pronounced "ibara" when by itself, and plants bearing thorns, probably Rosa multiflora, were used as a defense against invaders in the 8th century, so (茨城)→ thorn castle.
Ishikawa	石川県	Ishikawa-ken (石川県) was a river with many boulders (石川)→ stone river.
Iwate	岩手県	Iwate-ken (岩手県) means "rock hand". There are several theories about the origin of the name "Iwate", but the most well-known is the tale Oni no tegata, which is associated with the Mitsuishi or "Three Rocks" Shrine in Morioka. These rocks are said to have been thrown down into Morioka by an eruption of Mt. Iwate. In the legend Oni no tegata, a devil harassed the local people. When the people prayed to the spirits of Mitsuishi for protection, the devil was shackled to rocks and promised never to trouble the people again. As a seal of his oath the devil made a handprint on one of the rocks, thus the name Iwate (岩手)→, literally "rock hand". Even now after a rainfall it is said that the devil's hand print can still be seen there. An alternate possibility is that as Iwate has a volcano Iwake-san with explosive boulders, iwa ga deru iwaderu (deguchi) Iwate (岩手)→(crag-hand)
Kagawa	香川県	Kagawa-ken (香川県) - The Kotō River in Kinashi had many fragrant flowers (香川)→ fragrant river.
Kagoshima	鹿児島県	Kagoshima-ken (鹿児島県) - The name of Kagoshima came from Kagoshima Shrine in Hayato, Kirishima. There are several theories about the origin of the name, such as a boat of Hoori who was enshrined there was built in Kagoyama Mountain, or that Kagoshima means a kami mountain (island) or an island where kami lives, Kagoshima came from Sakurajima, which is encircled by cliffs, an old name of Kagoshima. An early name of Sakurajima volcano, which is encircled by cliffs, was Kakoshima, which became (鹿児島)→ deer child island.
Kanagawa	神奈川県	Kanagawa-ken (神奈川県) means "god sound river" or "divine sound river". A "kanna" is a type of lathe. In the area is a tiny stream, both sides of which are freshly smooth as though they had been lathed, then collapsed, after which the water turned reddish brown, kami-na-gawa →神奈川 (god-na sound-river).
Kōchi	高知県	Kochi-ken (高知県) - Kochi was originally Kawanakajima (河中島), and has since been twice changed; a monk recommended the name Kawachi (河内), becoming Kōchi (高知)→ high knowledge.
Kumamoto	熊本県	Kumamoto-ken (熊本県) - The current kanji for Kumamoto literally means "bear root/origin", or "origin of the bear". There are no bears in the area, the name actually refers to either a bend in the river kawa no magarikado, with moto was changed from muta (wetland), or is derived from the Kumaso, a mythical people of ancient Japan. Katō Kiyomasa built a castle here and liked the strong connotation of bears, so changed the kanji (熊本)→ bear source.
Kyōto	京都府	Kyoto-fu (京都府) - For most of its history, the city of Kyoto was the Imperial capital of Japan, kyo no Miyako later Heian-kyō then Kyoto (京都)→ capital city.
Mie	三重県	Mie-ken (三重県) - The name Mie was taken from a comment about the region made by Prince Yamato Takeru on his way back from conquering the eastern regions in the 8th century, when he complained my leg hurts "mie ni matagai" like three layer mochi (三重)→threefold.
Miyagi	宮城県	Miyagi-ken (宮城県) means "shrine castle". Taga Castle was a fort in Tōhoku established in the eighth century. The emperor's observation outpost called Miya-no-shiro became (宮城)→ palace castle. Site of Tagajō.
Miyazaki	宮崎県	Miyazaki-ken (宮崎県) - Emperor Jimmu's Miyazaki jinja was here (宮崎)→shrine cape.
Nagano	長野県	Nagano-ken (長野県) means "long field". Originally nagai heya, a long flat land or bonchi surrounded by mountains 25 kilometers long and 10 kilometers wide (長野)→ long field.
Nagasaki	長崎県	Nagasaki-ken (長崎県) – Nagasaki city was originally named Fukai, it was renamed after Nagasaki Kōtarō, a local notable (長崎)→ long cape.
Nara	奈良県	Nara-ken (奈良県) – The folk etymology claims that when soldiers of Emperor Sujin, the 10th emperor, climbed an 80-meter hill to build a fort, there were so many weeds, so they had to stomp them down to clear the space, meaning fumi narashite. Another theory suggests that Nara is derived from naru, a term for flat land, and the Kanji for Nara were historically written as 平城. During the Heian period, when the imperial capital was established in 710 at Heijō-kyō, this was changed to lucky phonetic kanji, and has been twice changed since then (奈良)→(na sound-good).
Niigata	新潟県	Niigata-ken (新潟県) means "new tidal flat"- higata (新潟). As there is no record about the origin of the name, it is believed that "Niigata" referred to a lagoon at the mouth of the Shinano River, an inland bay at the river's entrance, or a village that stood on an island within the estuary.
Ōita	大分県	Oita-ken (大分県) - The origins of the name Ōita are documented in a report from the early 8th century called the Chronicles of Bungo (豊後国風土記 bungonokuni-fudoki). According to the document, in the first century, Emperor Keikō visited Kyushu, and saw the very first rice crop in Japan, exclaiming 'This is a vast land, indeed. It shall be known as Okita-Kuni (碩田国)!', meaning "Land of the Great Fields", later came to be written as "Ōita" (大分)→ big section. Present day interpretations based on Ōita's topography, as well as the Nihonshoki, state that Oita's name comes from "Okita", meaning "many fields", rather than "vast" or "great" field, because of Ōita's complex terrain.
Okayama	岡山県	Okayama-ken (岡山県) - Okayama city has several mountains-Tenjin-yama, Isui-yama and Oka-yama (岡山)→hillock mountain.
Okinawa	沖縄県	Okinawa-ken (沖縄県) means good fishing place offshore-changed from oki no wa to become (沖縄)→open sea rope. In 754 the Chinese monk Jianzhen reached Japan. His biography Tō Daiwajō Tōseiden (779) makes reference to Akonaha (阿児奈波) on the route, which may refer to modern Okinawa Island.
Ōsaka	大阪府	Osaka-fu (大阪府) - Slope is saka in Japanese, and the kanji for small was changed to big (大阪)→ big slope.
Saga	佐賀県	Saga-ken (佐賀県) - There was a river named Sakagawa, which reversed flow at high tide-saka noboru, the kanji was changed during the Edo period (佐賀)→help congratulations.
Saitama	埼玉県	Saitama-ken (埼玉県) means the area "over the Tamagawa River" saki no tama, but the kanji reading has become (埼玉)→cape-jewel.
Shiga	滋賀県	Shiga-ken (滋賀県) - With the abolition of the han system, eight prefectures were formed in Omi. They were unified into Shiga Prefecture in September 1872. "Shiga Prefecture" was named after "Shiga District" because Ōtsu belonged to the district until 1898. In Lake Biwa near the emperor's city, there were many rocks ishi ga aru tokoro-the phrase shortened to shika and the kanji was changed four times (滋賀)→multiply congratulations.
Shimane	島根県	Shimane-ken (島根県) – The current Shimane prefecture was divided into three parts: Iwami, Izumo, and Oki. That lasted until the abolition of the han system took place in 1871. During the Nara period, Kakinomoto no Hitomaro read a poem on Shimane's nature when he was sent as the royal governor. In very ancient times, the Shimane peninsula was a separate island, whose mountain was mythically pulled from the sea with a rope (mine= island mountain), shimano ue ni mine became (島根)→ island root.
Shizuoka	静岡県	Shizuoka-ken (静岡県) means "quiet hill". Shizuhatoyama - humoto or foothills was changed, so it now reads (静岡) → silent hill.
Tochigi	栃木県	Tochigi-ken (栃木県) means "horse chestnut tree". Tochigi comes from tochi no ki, as there were many horse chestnut trees (栃木) in the area.
Tokushima	徳島県	Tokushima-ken (徳島県) – In 1585 Hachisuka Iemasa, daimyō of Tokushima, built his castle on a delta island, and wanted a lucky name (徳島)→ virtuous island.
Tōkyō	東京都	Tokyo-to (東京都) means "East Capital". Tokyo was originally known as Edo (江戸), which means "estuary". Its name was changed to Tokyo ("東京" Tōkyō: tō (east) + kyō (capital)) when it became the imperial capital in 1868.
Tottori	鳥取県	Tottori-ken (鳥取県) – The first kanji, 鳥 (tori), means "bird" and the second, 取 (tori) means "to catch", together tori-tori. Early residents in the area made their living catching the region's plentiful waterfowl. The name first appears in the Nihon Shoki in the 23rd year of the Empress Suiko when Yukuha Tana, an elder from Izumo, visits the empress. The imperial Prince Homatsu-wake was unable to speak, despite being 30 years of age. "Yukuha Tana presented the swan to the emperor. Homatsu-wake no Mikoto played with this swan and at last learned to speak. Therefore, Yukaha Tana was liberally rewarded, and was granted the title of Tottori no Miyakko."
Toyama	富山県	Toyama-ken (富山県) means "rich mountain". It was originally Sotoyama, (外山) "far-away mountain", later became (富山)→ rich mountain.
Wakayama	和歌山県	Wakayama-ken (和歌山県) – This name comes from a Man'yōshū tanka poem-wakanouranishiomichikurebakataonaniashibeosashitetsurunakiwataru, and means tidal land. In 1585 Toyotomi Hideyoshi came from Okayama and attacked the castle, renaming it Wakayama-jo, changing the kanji to 和歌山 (harmony-sing-mountain).
Yamagata	山形県	Yamagata-ken (山形県) means "mountain shape". A place that has mountains yama no aru chiho, the kanji characters were changed (山形)→(mountain-shape) because the sound is lucky.
Yamaguchi	山口県	Yamaguchi-ken (山口県) means mountain entrance, as the entrance to Higashi-hōben-zan mountain.
Yamanashi	山梨県	Yamanashi-ken (山梨県) means "mountain pear" (Pyrus pyrifolia). From the many yamanashi no ki trees, the name was chosen in 1871 (山梨)→ mountain pear.

== See also ==
- Japanese exonyms
- Prefectures of Japan

== Bibliography ==
- Dening, Walter (1904). A New Life of Toyotomi Hideyoshi. Tokyo: Kyobun-kwan.
