= Hiushinai Station =

Railway station in Kitami, Hokkaido, Japan

Coordinates: 43.8808°N 144.0000°E

Hiushinai Station 緋牛内駅
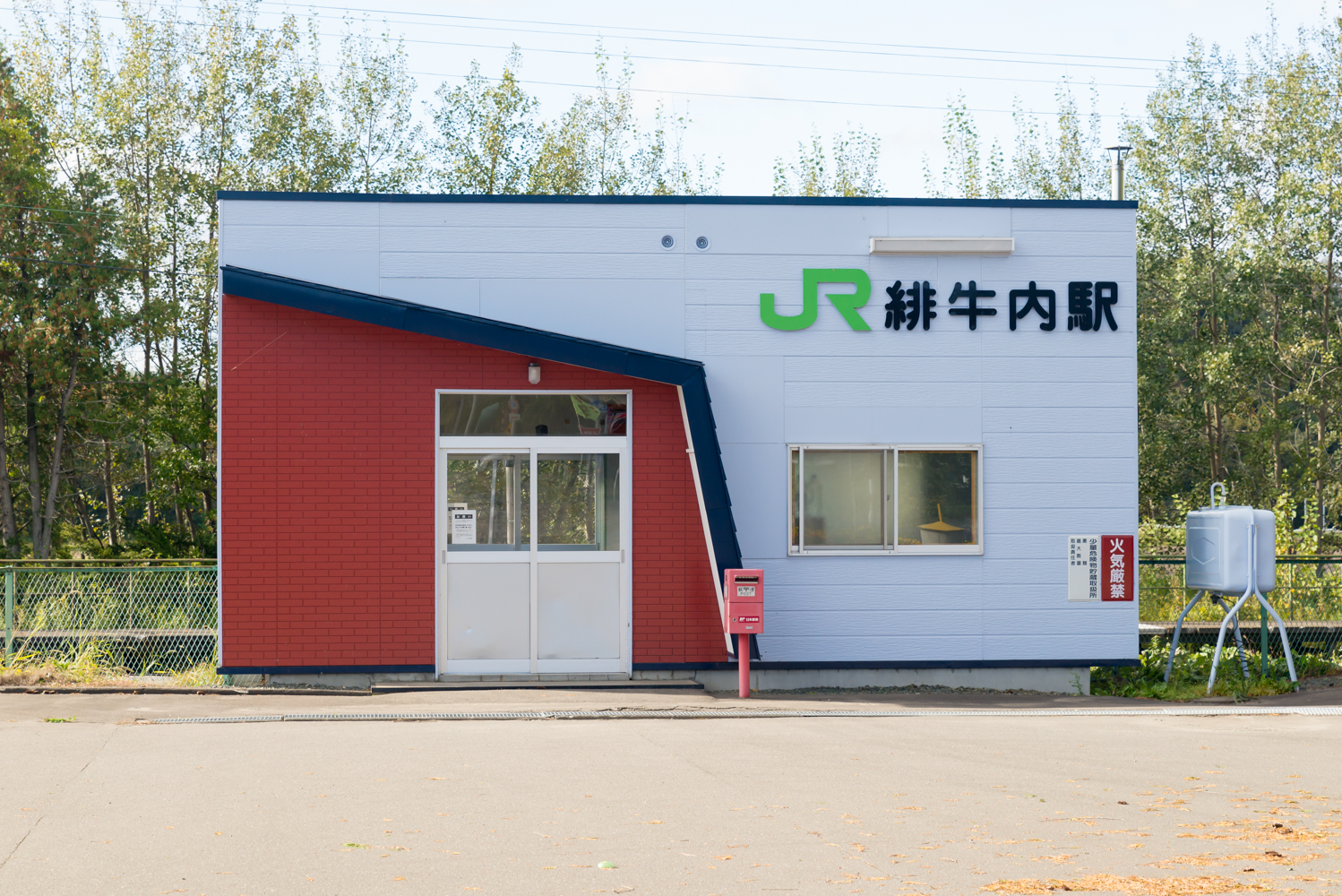
- Station building

General information
- Location: Hiushinai, Tanno-machi, Kitami, Hokkaido （北海道北見市端野町緋牛内） Japan
- Operator: JR Hokkaido
- Line: Sekihoku Main Line

Other information
- Station code: A64

History
- Opened: 1912
Location

Hiushinai Station (緋牛内駅, Hiushinai-eki) is a railway station located in Hiushinai in the Tanno-chō district of Kitami-shi city in Hokkaidō, Japan and is served by trains running on the Sekihoku Main Line, operated by JR Hokkaido. The station is located in one of the "coldest and remotest areas in Japan."

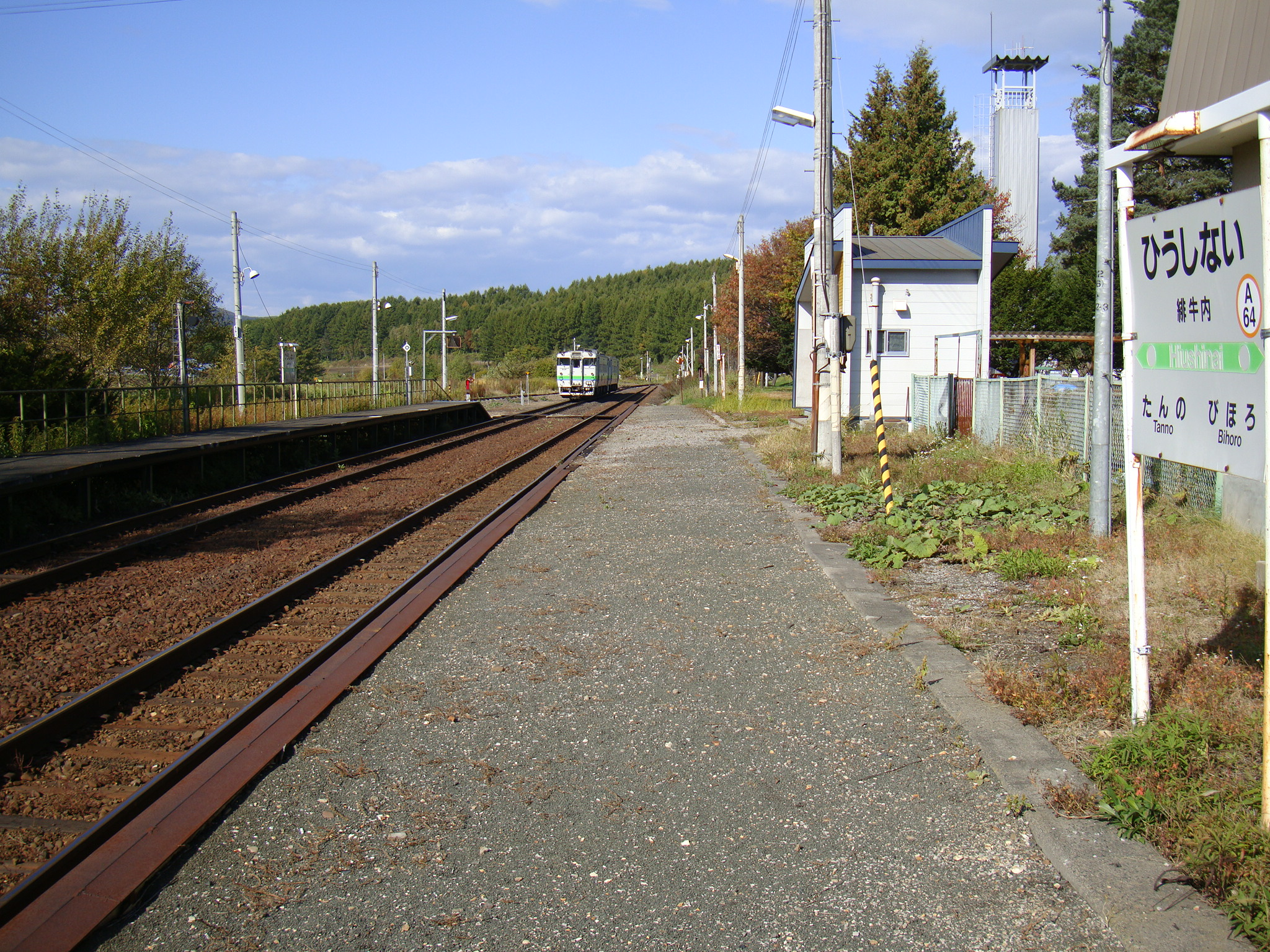
Platform

== Station structure ==
Hiushinai is an unstaffed station with two side platforms alongside two railway tracks. It has a toilet and a waiting room.

== Station environs ==
- Hiushinai elementary school
- Hokkaidō highway 556
- National highway 39

== Adjacent stations ==
«	Service	»
Sekihoku Main Line
Limited Express Okhotsk: Does not stop at this station
Limited Express Taisetsu: Does not stop at this station
Tanno	Local	Bihoro

== History ==
- October 5, 1911: Station opened
- January 10, 1983: Station became unstaffed on completion of CTC system

=== Future plans ===
In June 2023, this station was selected to be among 42 stations on the JR Hokkaido network to be slated for abolition owing to low ridership.
