= Memanbetsu, Hokkaido =

Coordinates: 43.9160°N 144.1715°E

Memanbetsu 女満別町 めまんべつちょう
- Former Town
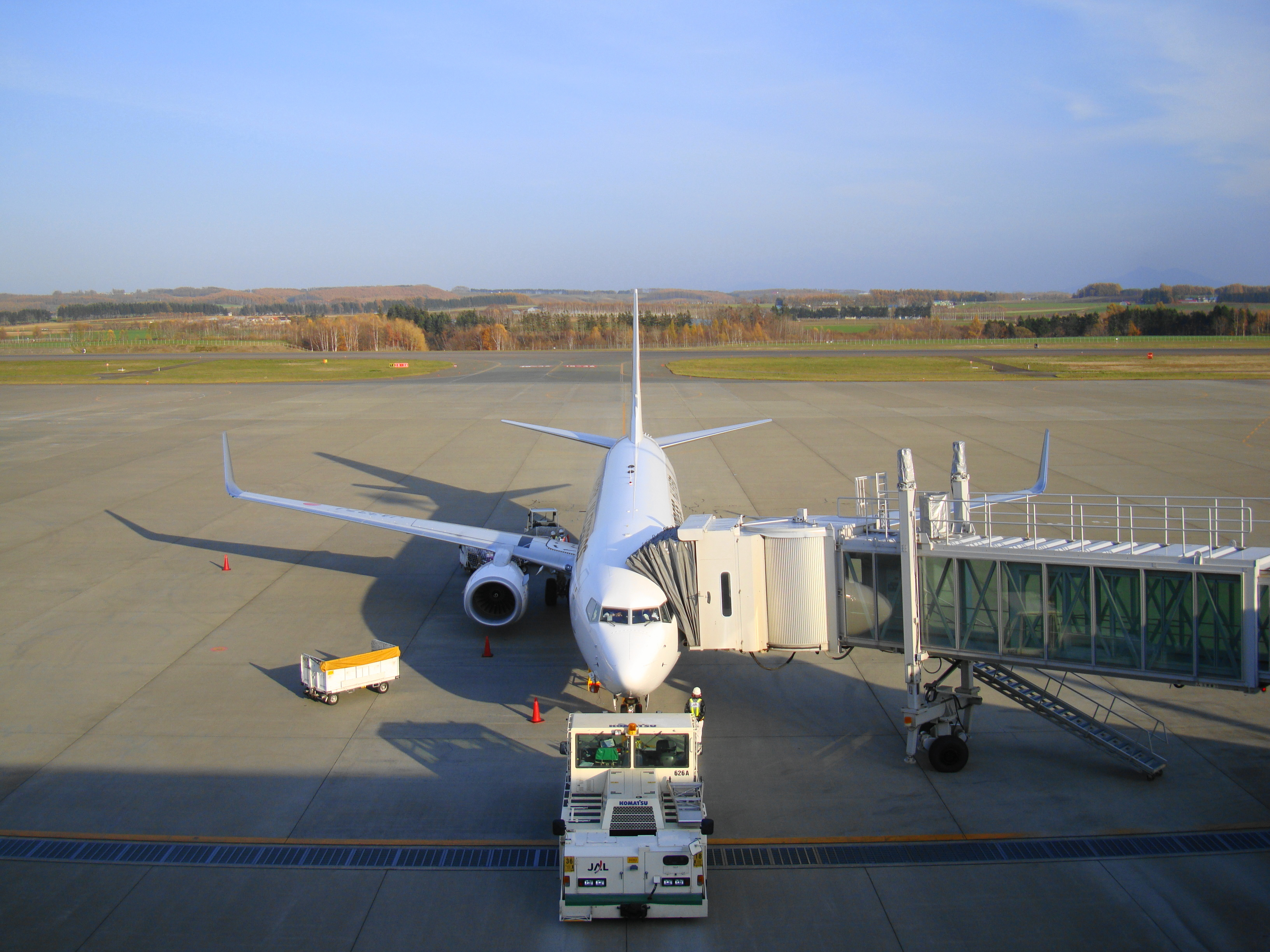
- Memanbetsu Airport (2011)

- Flag Seal
- Interactive map of Memanbetsu
- Country: Japan
- Region: Hokkaido
- Prefecture: Hokkaido
- Subprefecture: Abashiri
- District: Abashiri
- Merged: March 31, 2006

Area
  - Total: 159.24 km^{2} (61.48 sq mi)

Population (2005)
  - Total: 5,909
  - Density: 37.11/km^{2} (96.11/sq mi)

Memanbetsu (女満別町, Memanbetsu-chō) was a town located in Abashiri District, Abashiri Subprefecture (now Okhotsk Subprefecture), Hokkaido, Japan.

As of 2004, the town had an estimated population of 5,925 and a population density of 37.26 persons per km^{2}. The total area was 159.02 km^{2}.

On March 31, 2006, Memanbetsu was merged with the village of Higashimokoto (also from Abashiri District) to create the new town of Ōzora.

Memanbetsu's name was derived from the Ainu "Memanpet" meaning "River with a spring"

== Transportation ==
In the area of the former town, Hokkaido Railway Company (JR Hokkaido) operates two stations along the Sekihoku Line:

- Memambetsu Station
- Nishi-Memambetsu Station

Both are named after the former town.

Memanbetsu Airport is named after the former town.

== History ==
- 1890 – Establishment of timber harvesting for the purpose of supplying the match manufacturing industry
- 1898 – Agriculture begins, bringing the first extensive settlement of the area
- 1912 – With the opening of Memambetsu station on the new railway line between Kitami and Abashiri large numbers of settlers begin arriving and a small village begins to develop
- April 1921 – Memanbetsu is administratively separated from Abashiri City and accorded official village status
- April 1951 – Memanbetsu is accorded official town status
- 31 March 2006 – Memanbetsu Town is merged with Higashimokoto Village (also in Abashiri District) to form the new town of Ōzora

== Climate ==
Climate data for Memanbetsu (2003−2020 normals, extremes 2003−present)
Month	Jan	Feb	Mar	Apr	May	Jun	Jul	Aug	Sep	Oct	Nov	Dec	Year
Record high °C (°F)	7.2 (45.0)	9.9 (49.8)	18.0 (64.4)	30.2 (86.4)	37.7 (99.9)	35.7 (96.3)	36.7 (98.1)	36.9 (98.4)	33.2 (91.8)	26.1 (79.0)	20.9 (69.6)	14.8 (58.6)	37.7 (99.9)
Mean daily maximum °C (°F)	−2.9 (26.8)	−2.1 (28.2)	3.0 (37.4)	10.4 (50.7)	16.9 (62.4)	20.7 (69.3)	23.8 (74.8)	25.3 (77.5)	21.9 (71.4)	15.5 (59.9)	7.9 (46.2)	0.5 (32.9)	11.7 (53.1)
Daily mean °C (°F)	−7.9 (17.8)	−7.4 (18.7)	−1.7 (28.9)	4.6 (40.3)	10.5 (50.9)	15.0 (59.0)	18.5 (65.3)	20.2 (68.4)	16.5 (61.7)	9.7 (49.5)	2.8 (37.0)	−4.5 (23.9)	6.4 (43.4)
Mean daily minimum °C (°F)	−14.4 (6.1)	−14.3 (6.3)	−7.2 (19.0)	−1.1 (30.0)	4.7 (40.5)	10.2 (50.4)	14.4 (57.9)	16.2 (61.2)	11.5 (52.7)	3.8 (38.8)	−2.6 (27.3)	−10.7 (12.7)	0.9 (33.6)
Record low °C (°F)	−24.8 (−12.6)	−27.0 (−16.6)	−20.8 (−5.4)	−13.9 (7.0)	−3.9 (25.0)	0.4 (32.7)	6.3 (43.3)	6.6 (43.9)	2.4 (36.3)	−7.5 (18.5)	−15.4 (4.3)	−24.1 (−11.4)	−27.0 (−16.6)
Average precipitation mm (inches)	—	—	—	—	—	72.1 (2.84)	76.1 (3.00)	129.2 (5.09)	89.4 (3.52)	79.2 (3.12)	—	—	—
Average snowfall cm (inches)	81 (32)	75 (30)	61 (24)	23 (9.1)	2 (0.8)	0 (0)	0 (0)	0 (0)	0 (0)	1 (0.4)	14 (5.5)	66 (26)	324 (128)
Average precipitation days (≥ 1.0 mm)	—	—	—	—	—	9.6	8.8	10.3	9.6	8.8	—	—	—
Average snowy days (≥ 3 cm)	9.3	7.8	7.3	2.1	0.3	0	0	0	0	0.1	1.6	6.8	35.3
Source: JMA
