= Yobito Station =

Railway station in Abashiri, Hokkaido, Japan

Coordinates: 43°57′49.49″N 144°13′06.97″E

Yobito Station 呼人駅
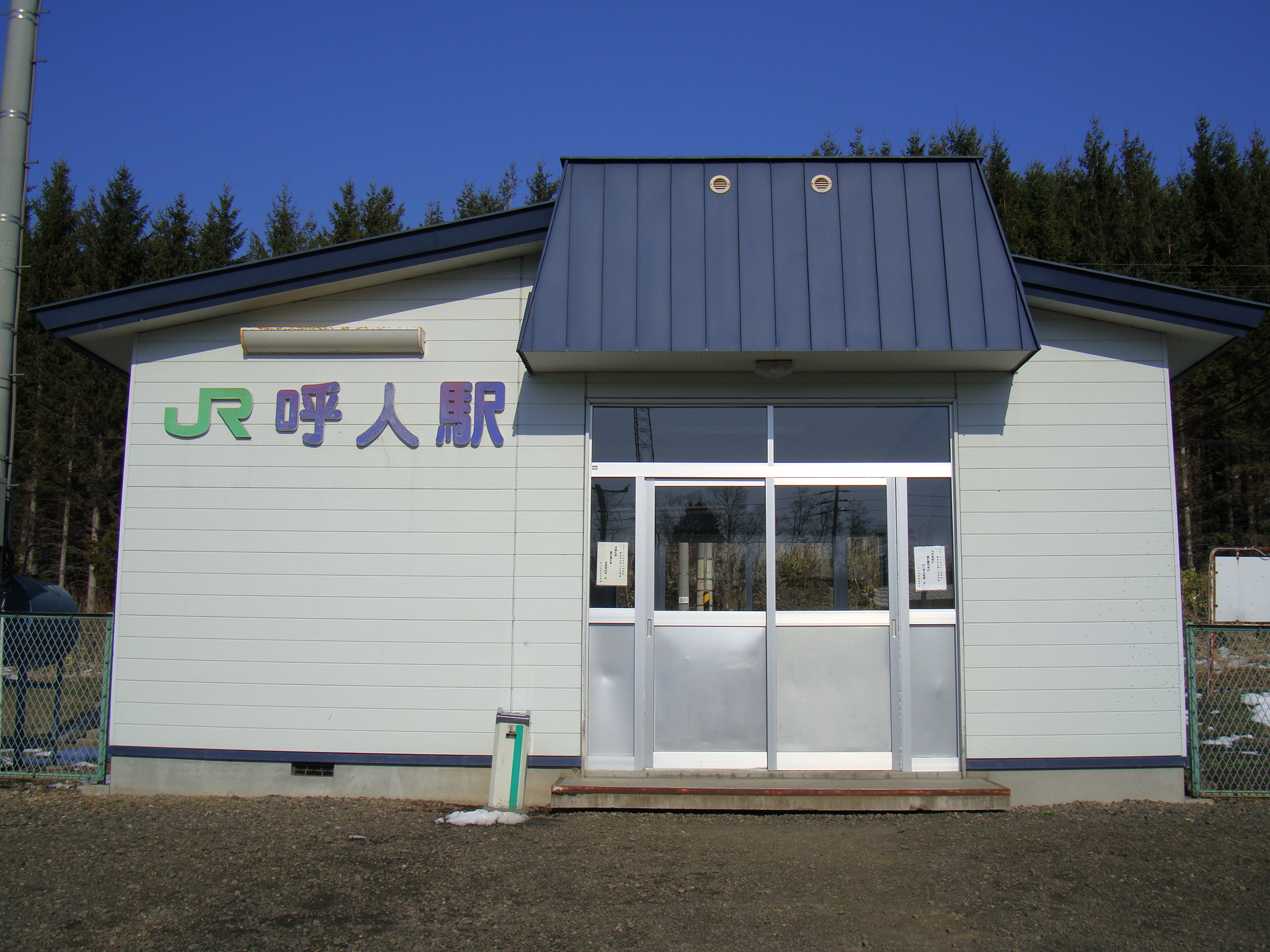
- Station building

General information
- Location: Yobito, Abashiri, Hokkaido （北海道網走市字呼人） Japan
- Operator: JR Hokkaido
- Line: Sekihoku Main Line

Other information
- Station code: A68

History
- Opened: 1923
Location

Yobito (呼人駅, Yobito-eki) is a railway station on the JR Hokkaido Sekihoku Main Line in Yobito, a suburb of Abashiri in Hokkaidō. The station name and suburb name come from the Ainu language.

== Station structure ==
The station has two platforms facing each other, with two railway lines.

== Station surroundings ==
The village of Yobito has a large geographical spread.

- National Highway 39
- Abashiri-koso
- Kanpo Abashiri Inn
- Abashiri Grand Hotel
- Tokyo University of Agriculture Okhotsk Campus

== History ==
- October 5, 1923: Station opened.

== Adjacent stations ==
«	Service	»
Sekihoku Main Line
Limited Express Okhotsk: Does not stop at this station
Limited Express Taisetsu: Does not stop at this station
Memambetsu	Local	Abashiri
