= Nishi-Memambetsu Station =

Railway station in Ōzora, Hokkaido, Japan

Coordinates: 43.8797°N 144.1490°E

Nishi-Memambetsu Station 西女満別駅
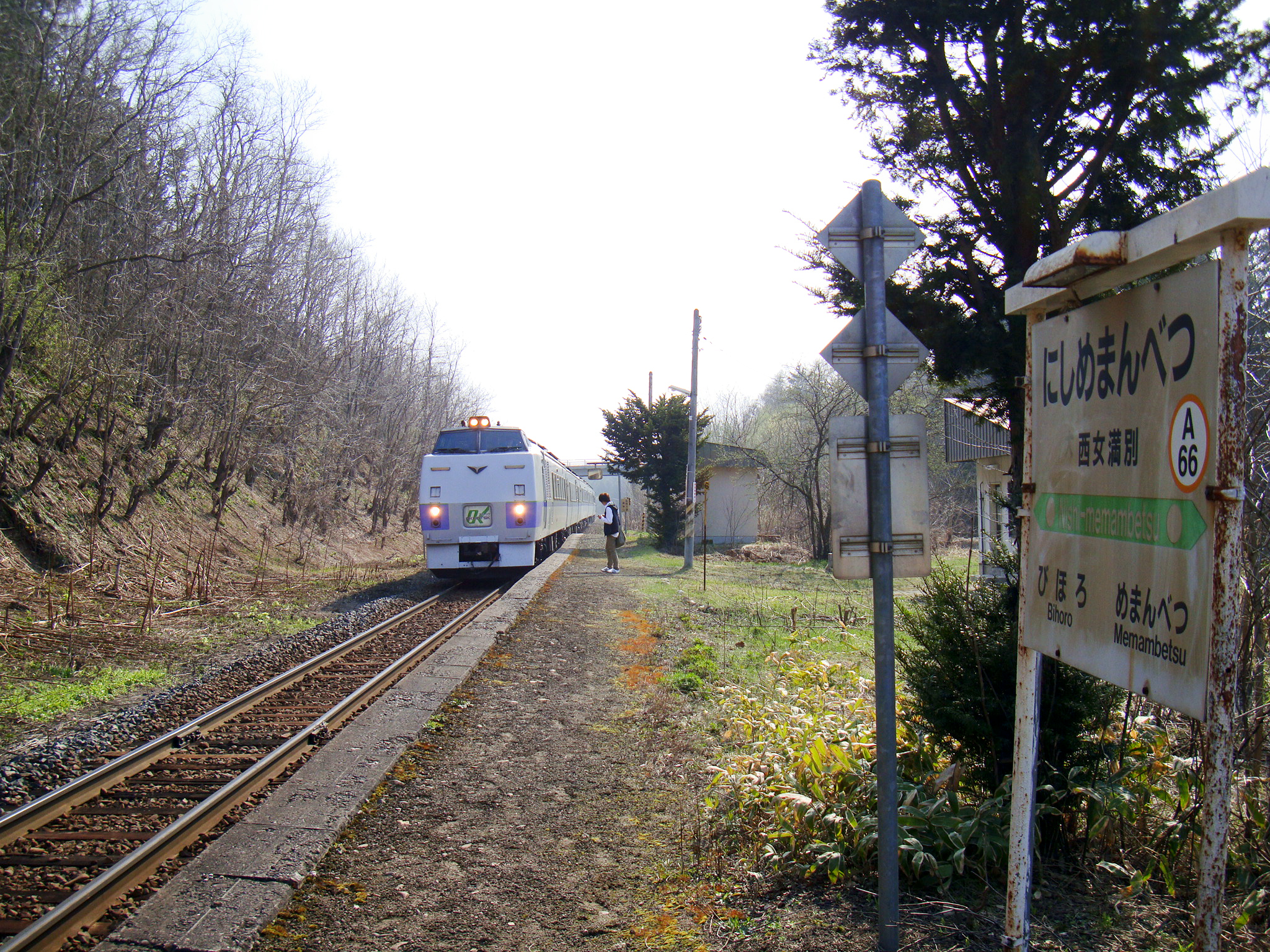
- View of the platform and track, May 2009

General information
- Location: Hongō, Ōzora, Hokkaido （北海道網走郡大空町女満別本郷） Japan
- Operator: JR Hokkaido
- Line: Sekihoku Main Line

Other information
- Station code: A66

History
- Opened: 1947
- Former names: (until 1950)
Location

Nishi-Memambetsu Station (西女満別駅, Nishi-Memanbetsu-eki) is a railway station in Ōzora, Hokkaidō, Japan, operated by the Hokkaido Railway Company (JR Hokkaido). It is the closest station to Memanbetsu Airport.

== Lines ==
The Nishi-Memambetsu Station is served by the Sekihoku Main Line from Asahikawa to Abashiri.

== Station layout ==
The station is an above-ground station and consists of a single side platform serving a single bidirectional track. The station has no toilet facilities.

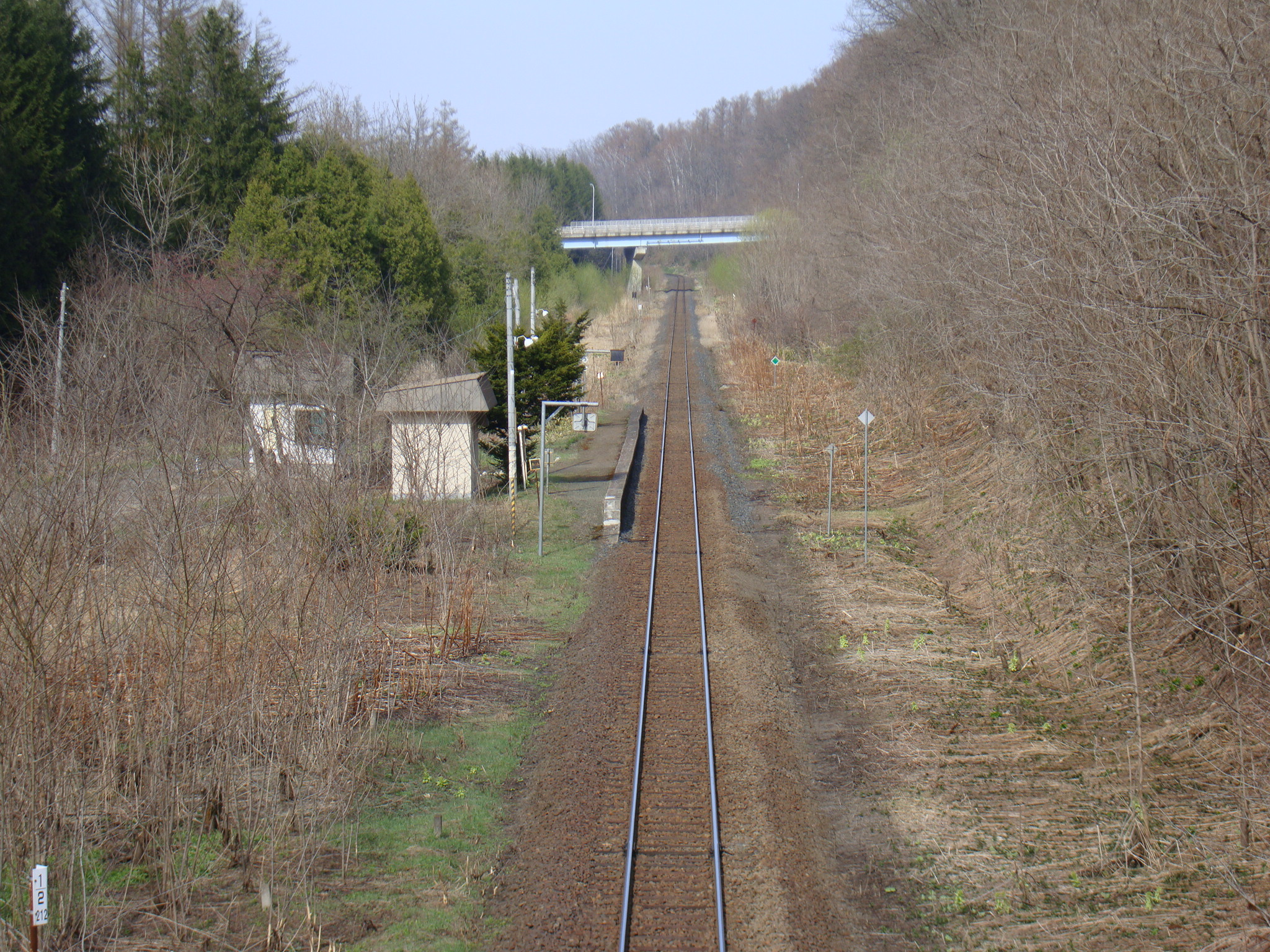
Overview of the station, May 2009

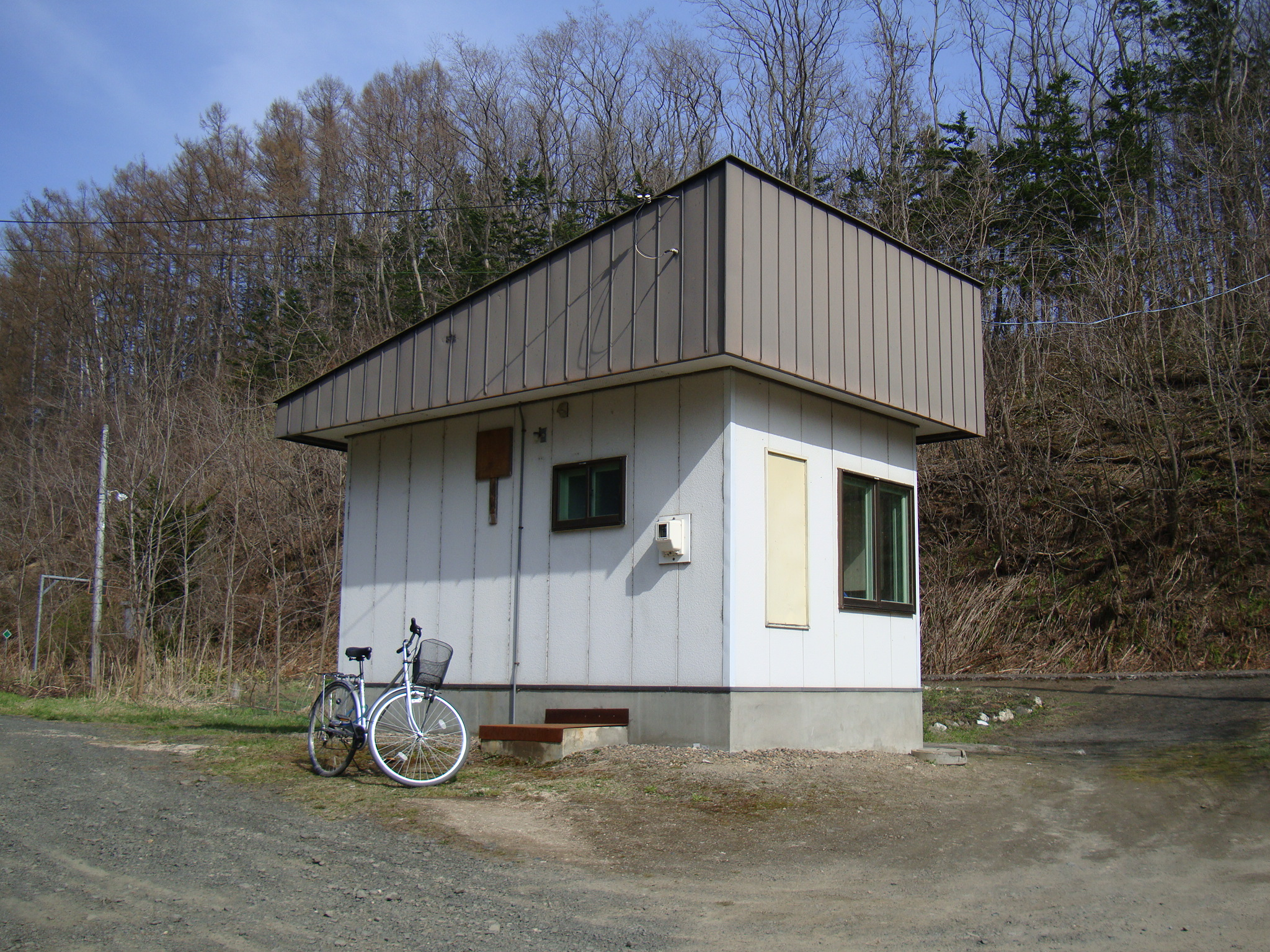
Station structure, May 2009

== Adjacent stations ==
«	Service	»
Sekihoku Main Line
Limited Express Okhotsk: Does not stop at this station
Limited Express Taisetsu: Does not stop at this station
Bihoro	Local	Memambetsu

== History ==
The station opened in 1947 as a temporary arrival and departure point for Asahino. From January 15, 1950, the station becomes a permanent passenger station and was renamed Nishi-Memambetsu. A freight platform was constructed in 1951.

The station became unstaffed from January 10, 1983.

== Surrounding area ==
The station is a twenty-minute walk from Memanbetsu Airport.
