= Sakurada =

Sakurada (written: 桜田, 櫻田 or 樱田 lit. "cherry blossom field") is a Japanese surname. Notable people with the surname include:

- Dori Sakurada (桜田 通, born 1991), Japanese actor and singer
- Junko Sakurada (桜田 淳子, born 1958), Japanese singer and actress
- Kazuki Sakurada (櫻田 和樹, born 1982), Japanese footballer
- Kazuo Sakurada (桜田 一男, 1948–2020), Japanese professional wrestler
- Makoto Sakurada (櫻田 亮, born 1968), Japanese opera singer
- Sakurada Sadakuni, Japanese samurai
- Shimpei Sakurada (樱田 真平, born 1984), Japanese footballer
- Takeshi Sakurada (桜田 武, 1891–1943), Japanese general
- Yoshitaka Sakurada (桜田 義孝, born 1949), Japanese politician

== Fictional characters ==
- Haruna Sakurada (桜田 春菜), a character in the manga series Sailor Moon
- Jun Sakurada (桜田 ジュン), protagonist of the manga series Rozen Maiden
- Nene Sakurada (桜田 ネネ), a character in the manga series Crayon Shinchan
