= Bihoro =

Bihoro 美幌町
- Town
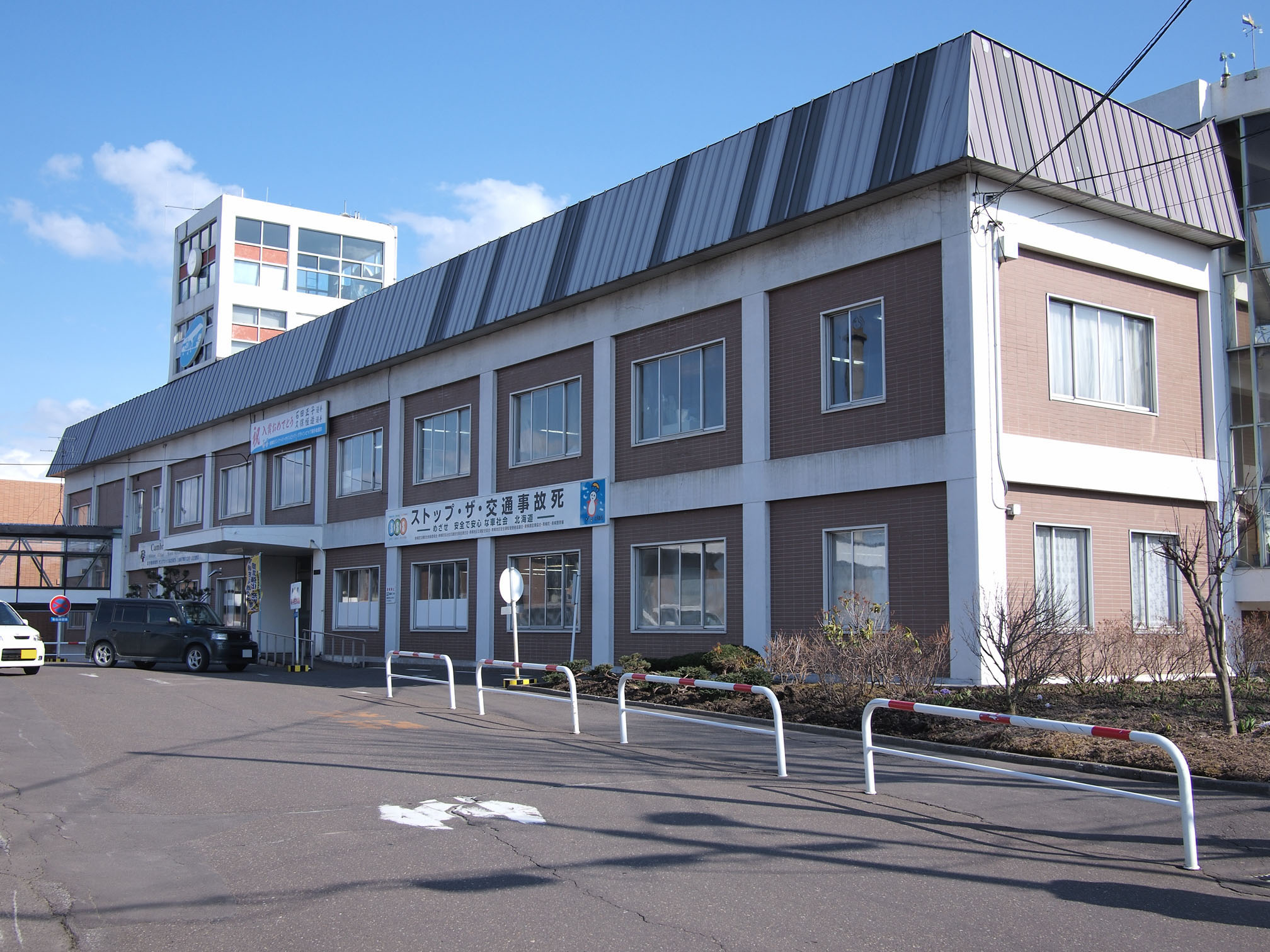
- Bihoro Town Hall

- Flag Emblem

- Location of Bihoro in Hokkaido (Okhotsk Subprefecture)

- Location in Japan
- Coordinates: 43°49′30″N 144°6′20″E
- Country: Japan
- Region: Hokkaido
- Prefecture: Hokkaido (Okhotsk Subprefecture)
- District: Abashiri

Government
  - Mayor: Tsuchiya Kōji (土谷耕治)

Area
  - Total: 438.36 km^{2} (169.25 sq mi)

Population (October 1, 2020)
  - Total: 18,697
  - Density: 42.652/km^{2} (110.47/sq mi)
- Time zone: UTC+09:00 (JST)
- City hall address: 2 Chōme 25 Banchi, Aza Higashi 2 Jō Kita, Bihoro-chō, Abashiri-gun, Hokkaidō; 092-8650
- Climate: Dfb
- Website: www.town.bihoro.hokkaido.jp
- Symbols
- Flower: Rhododendron dauricum
- Tree: Taxus cuspidata

Bihoro (美幌町, Bihoro-chō) is a town located in Okhotsk Subprefecture, Hokkaido, Japan. The name is derived from the Ainu word piporo, meaning "place of much water".

Largely agricultural, the town is best known for the Bihoro Pass, which has views over Lake Kussharo in the Akan National Park. It is also home to Bihoro Aviation Park, which contains a number of aircraft previously used by the Japan Self-Defense Forces.

== History ==
- 1915: Bihoro Village founded.
- 1919: Tsubetsu Village (津別村), now Tsubetsu Town, split.
- 1921: Part of Tsubetsu Village incorporated.
- 1923: Bihoro Village becomes Bihoro Town.
- 1946: Part of Memanbetsu Village (now Memanbetsu Town) incorporated.
- 1953: Bihoro song, Toru Takemitsu.

== Climate ==
Climate data for Bihoro (1991−2020 normals, extremes 1977−present)
Month	Jan	Feb	Mar	Apr	May	Jun	Jul	Aug	Sep	Oct	Nov	Dec	Year
Record high °C (°F)	8.4 (47.1)	10.8 (51.4)	17.1 (62.8)	31.5 (88.7)	37.4 (99.3)	37.2 (99.0)	38.2 (100.8)	36.5 (97.7)	33.6 (92.5)	26.2 (79.2)	21.0 (69.8)	15.6 (60.1)	38.2 (100.8)
Mean daily maximum °C (°F)	−2.7 (27.1)	−1.9 (28.6)	2.7 (36.9)	10.2 (50.4)	16.9 (62.4)	20.4 (68.7)	23.8 (74.8)	24.9 (76.8)	21.6 (70.9)	15.4 (59.7)	7.7 (45.9)	0.2 (32.4)	11.6 (52.9)
Daily mean °C (°F)	−8.3 (17.1)	−7.9 (17.8)	−2.5 (27.5)	4.3 (39.7)	10.2 (50.4)	14.4 (57.9)	18.3 (64.9)	19.6 (67.3)	15.8 (60.4)	9.2 (48.6)	2.2 (36.0)	−5.4 (22.3)	5.8 (42.5)
Mean daily minimum °C (°F)	−14.9 (5.2)	−15.1 (4.8)	−8.6 (16.5)	−1.5 (29.3)	4.1 (39.4)	9.2 (48.6)	13.8 (56.8)	15.2 (59.4)	10.5 (50.9)	3.1 (37.6)	−3.1 (26.4)	−11.4 (11.5)	0.1 (32.2)
Record low °C (°F)	−30.2 (−22.4)	−31.2 (−24.2)	−27.2 (−17.0)	−15.1 (4.8)	−5.2 (22.6)	−1.9 (28.6)	2.4 (36.3)	5.7 (42.3)	−0.5 (31.1)	−5.6 (21.9)	−17.4 (0.7)	−23.9 (−11.0)	−31.2 (−24.2)
Average precipitation mm (inches)	40.2 (1.58)	27.4 (1.08)	33.1 (1.30)	49.3 (1.94)	58.5 (2.30)	66.4 (2.61)	90.9 (3.58)	122.1 (4.81)	117.5 (4.63)	79.8 (3.14)	44.8 (1.76)	48.4 (1.91)	778.6 (30.65)
Average precipitation days (≥ 1.0 mm)	9.5	7.5	8.5	9.7	10.1	10.5	11.2	11.2	11.4	9.6	8.8	9.2	117.2
Mean monthly sunshine hours	116.2	131.2	163.5	168.5	177.3	164.4	158.1	157.9	155.7	158.2	131.5	125.2	1,807.8
Source: JMA

== Demographics ==
Per Japanese census data, the population of Bihoro has declined in recent decades.

Historical population
Year	Pop.	±%
1970	25,916	—
1980	26,534	+2.4%
1990	25,680	−3.2%
2000	23,905	−6.9%
2010	21,575	−9.7%
2020	18,697	−13.3%

== Mascot ==
Gyutaro, the town's mascot

Bihoro's mascot is Gyutaro (ぎゅうたろう). He is a gentle and shy black bull. He always sticks his tongue out whenever anyone praises him. His left biceps is shaped like the Bihoro Pass. He wears a sports scarf. This scarf (which resembled a river) contains energy to power his left biceps to give strength to lift or push stuff or to give an extra punch to his enemies. Without it, he will be weak. He eats vegetables to keep his biceps in shape. He has a father and mother, Gyuou (ぎゅうおう) and Gyuko (ぎゅうこ). He likes taking walks but does not like hunting. His birthday is July 19.
