= Higashimokoto, Hokkaido =

Higashimokoto 東藻琴村
- Village
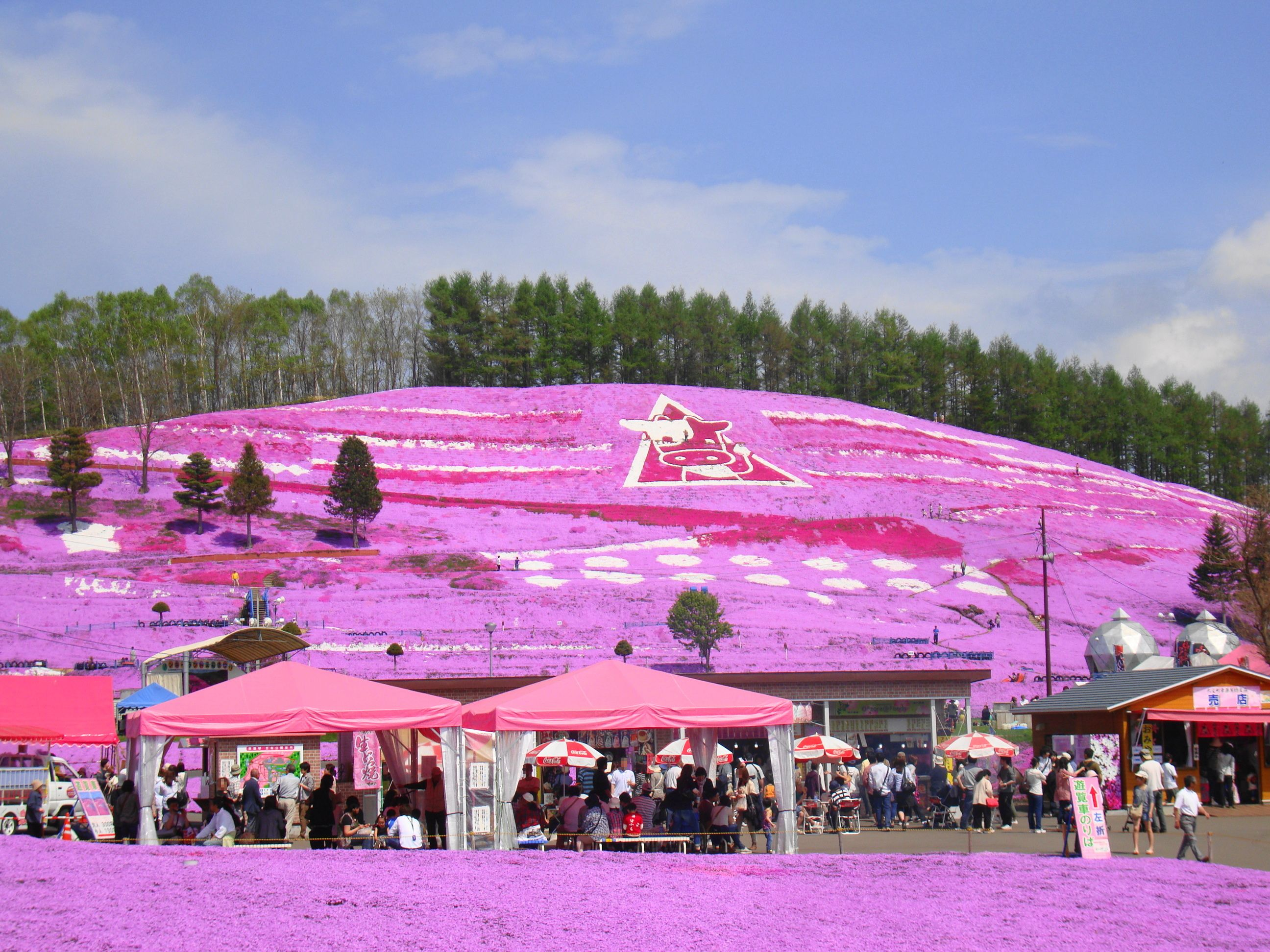
- Higashimokoto Shibazakura Park, in May

- Flag Emblem

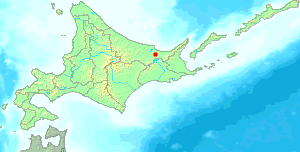
- Location of Higashimokoto in Hokkaido (Okhotsk Subprefecture)

- Location in Japan
- Coordinates: 43°50′41″N 144°17′43″E
- Country: Japan
- Region: Hokkaido
- Prefecture: Hokkaido (Okhotsk Subprefecture)
- Now part of Ōzora: March 31, 2006

Area
  - Total: 184.38 km^{2} (71.19 sq mi)

Population (2004)
  - Total: 2,745
  - Density: 14.89/km^{2} (38.6/sq mi)
- Time zone: UTC+09:00 (JST)
- City hall address: 360-1 Higashimokoto-mura, Abashiri-gun, Hokkaido; 099-3200
- Website: web.archive.org/web/20060209050135/http://www.vill.higashimokoto.hokkaido.jp/
- Symbols
- Flower: Adonis ramosa Phlox subulata
- Tree: Betula platyphylla

Higashimokoto (東藻琴村, Higashimokoto-mura) was a village located in Abashiri District, Abashiri Subprefecture (now Okhotsk Subprefecture), Hokkaido, Japan. It was split off from Abashiri Town (now Abashiri City) in 1947.

As of 2004, the village has an estimated population of 2,745 and a density of 14.89 persons per km^{2}. The total area is 184.38 km^{2}.

On March 31, 2006, Higashimokoto was merged with the town of Memanbetsu (also from Abashiri District) to create the new town of Ōzora.
