= Memambetsu Station =

Railway station in Ōzora, Hokkaido, Japan

Coordinates: 43°54′58.70″N 144°10′15.31″E

Memambetsu Station 女満別駅
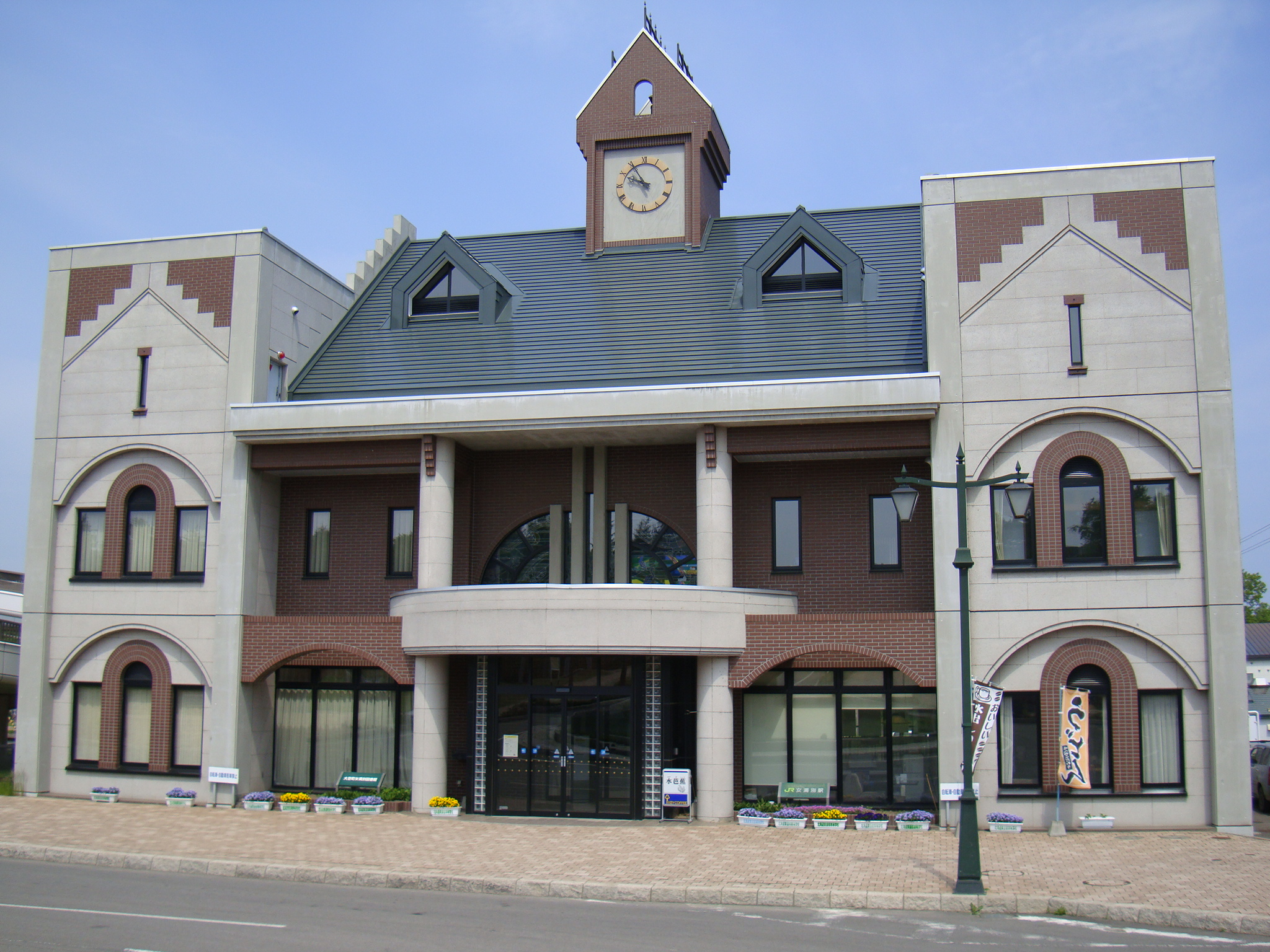
- Station building, June 2009

General information
- Location: 1 Hon-dōri, Memanbetsu, Ōzora, Abashiri, Hokkaido （北海道網走郡大空町女満別本通1丁目） Japan
- Operator: JR Hokkaido
- Line: Sekihoku Main Line

Other information
- Station code: A67

History
- Opened: 1912
Location

Memambetsu Station (女満別駅, Memanbetsu-eki) is a railway station on the Sekihoku Main Line in Ōzora, Hokkaido, Japan, operated by Hokkaido Railway Company (JR Hokkaido). It is located at the southern end of Lake Abashiri.

== Lines ==
Memambetsu Station is served by the Sekihoku Main Line from Asahikawa to Abashiri. The station is numbered A67.

== Station layout ==
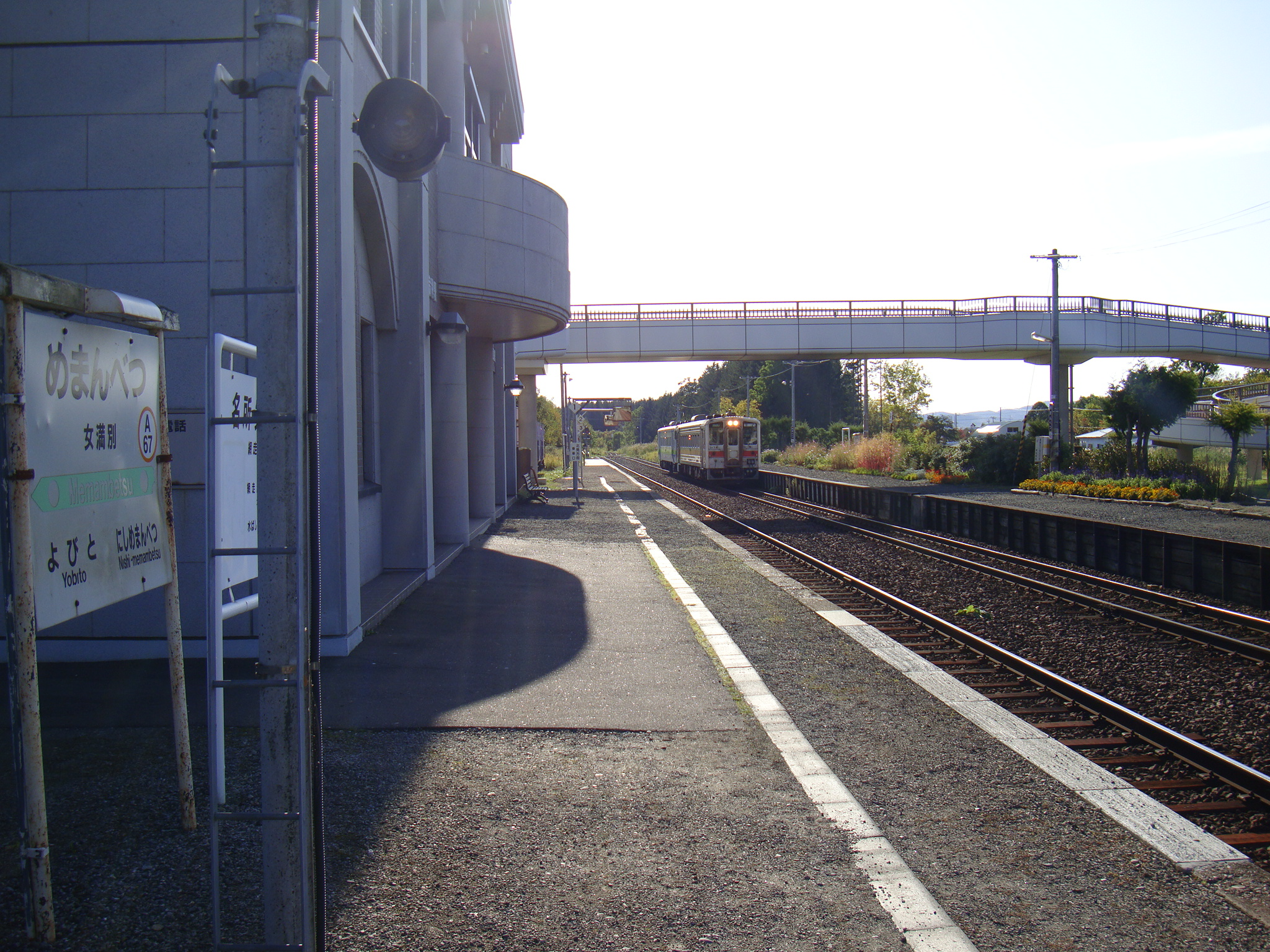
View of the platforms and tracks, October 2009

The station consists of two opposed side platforms serving two tracks. The station is unstaffed, but has toilet facilities.

=== Platforms ===
1	■ Sekihoku Main Line	for Kitami and Sapporo
2	■ Sekihoku Main Line	for Abashiri

== Adjacent stations ==
«	Service	»
Sekihoku Main Line
Bihoro	Limited Express Okhotsk	Abashiri
Bihoro	Limited Express Taisetsu	Abashiri
Nishi-Memambetsu	Local	Yobito

== History ==
The station opened on October 5, 1912.

A new station building was completed in 1990. The station became unstaffed from June 1, 1993.

== Surrounding area ==
- Ōzora Town Hall
- Lake Abashiri (a three-minute walk)
- Memanbetsu Onsen
- National Route 39
