= Mikage =

Mikage is a Japanese surname and location name. It may refer to:

== People ==
- Eiji Mikage (御影 瑛路, born 1983), Japanese novelist

== Fictional Characters ==
- Mikage is the last name of fraternal twins Aya and Aki in the manga and miniseries anime Ceres, Celestial Legend.
- Mikage is the surname of skilled assassin Kikyo in the Wolverine miniseries
- Mikage is also the name of Teito Klein's best friend in Seven Ghost anime
- Mikage is the name of the original land god in Julietta Suzuki 's manga Kamisama Hajimemashita.
- Mikage is the last name of a young football player Reo in Blue Lock.
- Mikage is the last name of a LBX player Mika in Little Battlers Experience.

== Locations ==
- Mikage, a neighborhood in Higashinada-ku, Kobe.
- Mikage, a former village in Kasai District, Hokkaido, now part of Shimizu, Hokkaido.
- Mikage, a former village in Nakakoma District, Yamanashi Prefecture. Now a part of the city of Minami-Alps.

== See also ==
- Mikage Station (disambiguation) for train stations with this name
