= Shintoku, Hokkaido =

Town in Japan

Shintoku 新得町 SHintoku-chō
- Town
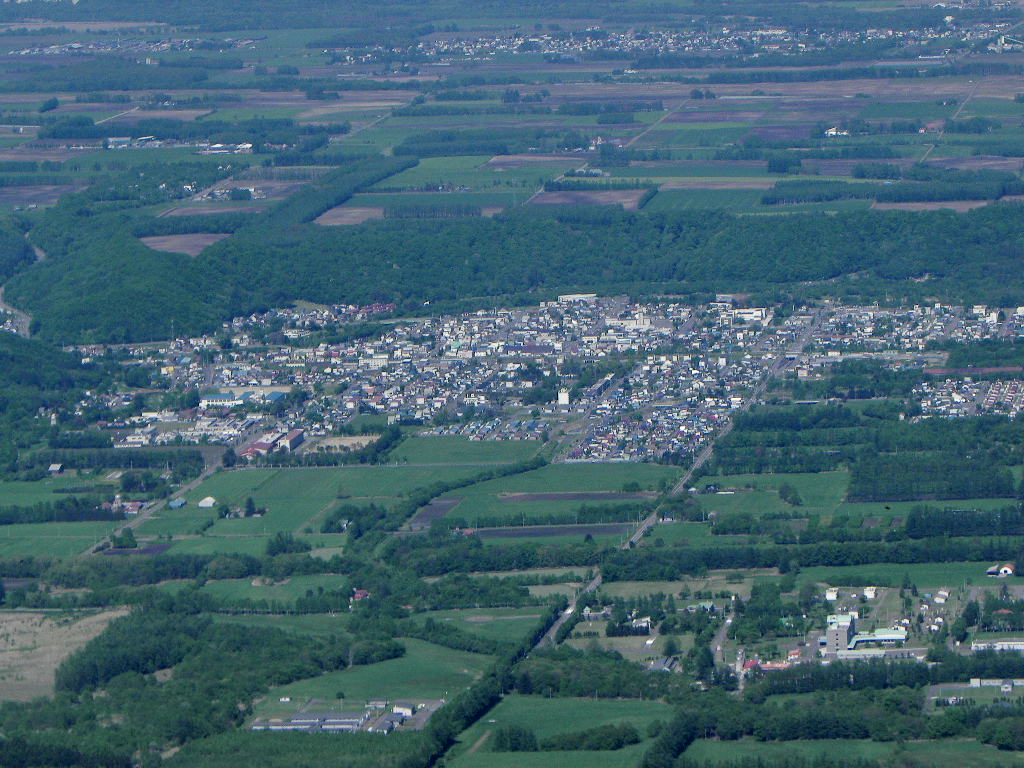
- Panorama of Shintoku

- Flag Emblem

- Location of Shintoku in Hokkaido (Tokachi Subprefecture)
- Interactive map of Shintoku
- Coordinates: 43°04′47″N 142°50′20″E
- Country: Japan
- Region: Hokkaido
- Prefecture: Hokkaido (Tokachi Subprefecture)
- District: Kamikawa (Tokachi)

Area
  - Total: 1,063.83 km^{2} (410.75 sq mi)

Population (August 30, 2025)
  - Total: 5,309
  - Density: 4.990/km^{2} (12.93/sq mi)
- Time zone: UTC+09:00 (JST)
- City hall address: 26, 3-jo Minami 4-chome, Shintoku-cho, Kamikawa-gun, Hokkaido 081-8501
- Climate: Dfb
- Website: www.shintoku-town.jp
- Symbols
- Bird: Hazel grouse
- Flower: Ezo Rhododendron
- Tree: Ezo Mountain Cherry

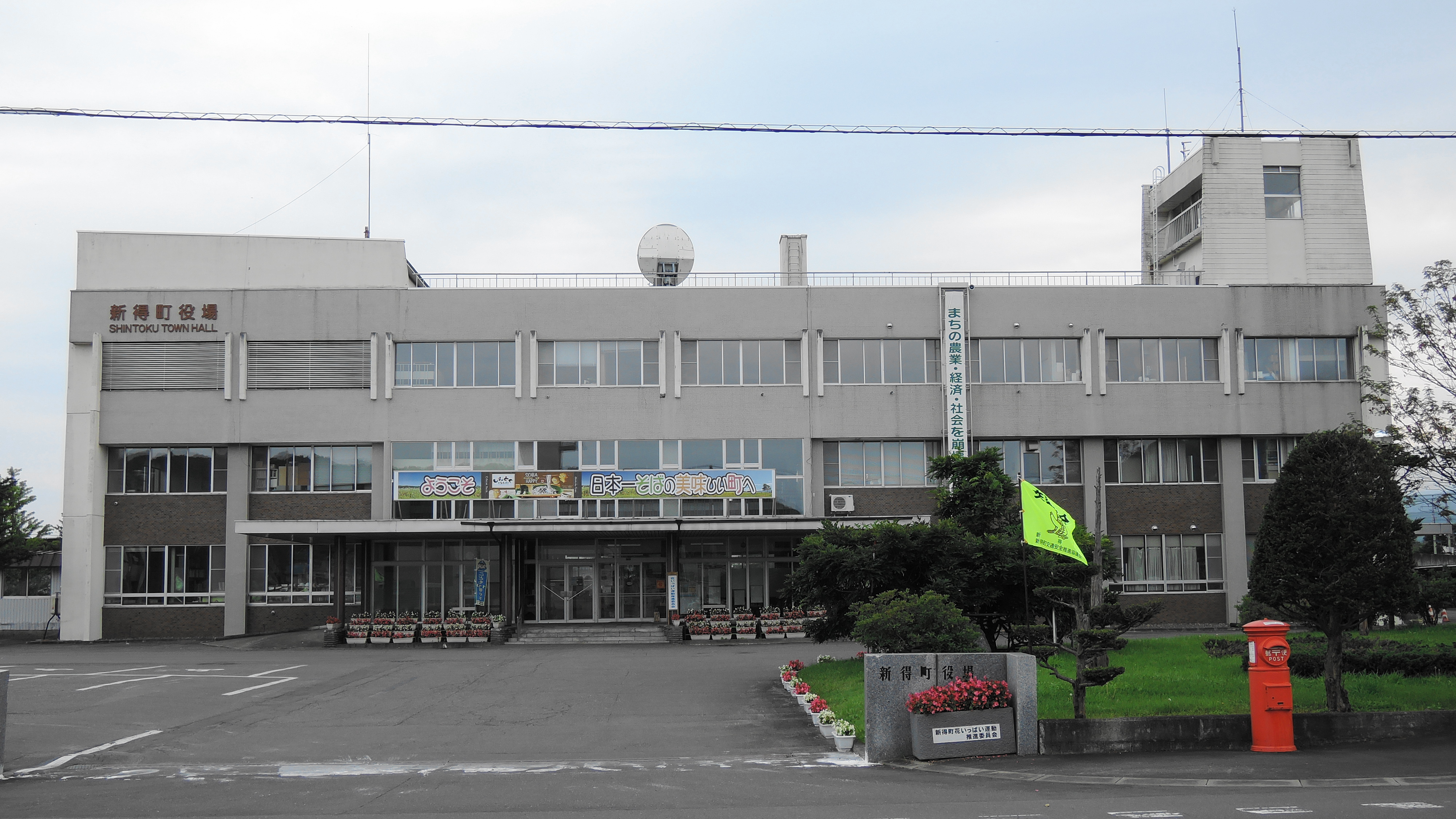
Shintoku town hall

Shintoku (新得町, Shintoku-chō) is a town located in Tokachi Subprefecture, Hokkaidō, Japan. As of 30 August 2025, the town had an estimated population of 5,309 in 3143 households, and a population density of 5 people per km^{2}. The total area of the town is 1,063.83 km^{2} (410.75 sq mi).

== Geography ==
Shintoku is located in southeastern Hokkaido in the northwestern part of the Tokachi Subprefecture. Approximately 90% of the total area is forest, and approximately 70% of the northern area is national forest in Daisetsuzan National Park. Mount Tomuraushi at 2141 meters is the highest point.

=== Neighboring municipalities ===
  - Shimizu
  - Kamishihoro
  - Shikaoi
  - Minamifurano
  - Kamifurano
  - Biei
  - Kamikawa

=== Climate ===
According to the Köppen climate classification, Shintoku has a humid continental climate. Its temperature ranges are large, with large annual and daily temperature differences. In winter, temperatures of around -20 °C are not uncommon, making it a bitterly cold area; however, the average minimum temperature in January is -11.1 °C, making it one of the towns in Tokachi that experiences relatively mild temperatures. The town is designated as a "specially heavy snow area."

Climate data for Shintoku（1991 - 2020）
Month	Jan	Feb	Mar	Apr	May	Jun	Jul	Aug	Sep	Oct	Nov	Dec	Year
Record high °C (°F)	8.7 (47.7)	15.9 (60.6)	16.6 (61.9)	28.3 (82.9)	35.4 (95.7)	35.9 (96.6)	37.3 (99.1)	36.2 (97.2)	32.7 (90.9)	27.9 (82.2)	20.9 (69.6)	15.1 (59.2)	37.3 (99.1)
Mean daily maximum °C (°F)	−2.2 (28.0)	−1.4 (29.5)	3.2 (37.8)	10.6 (51.1)	17.2 (63.0)	20.7 (69.3)	23.7 (74.7)	24.7 (76.5)	21.0 (69.8)	14.7 (58.5)	7.2 (45.0)	0.2 (32.4)	11.6 (52.9)
Daily mean °C (°F)	−6.2 (20.8)	−5.6 (21.9)	−1.1 (30.0)	5.3 (41.5)	11.3 (52.3)	15.2 (59.4)	18.8 (65.8)	19.8 (67.6)	16.0 (60.8)	9.5 (49.1)	3.0 (37.4)	−3.3 (26.1)	6.9 (44.4)
Mean daily minimum °C (°F)	−11.1 (12.0)	−10.7 (12.7)	−5.7 (21.7)	0.0 (32.0)	5.5 (41.9)	10.3 (50.5)	14.7 (58.5)	15.7 (60.3)	11.4 (52.5)	4.5 (40.1)	−1.1 (30.0)	−7.3 (18.9)	2.2 (36.0)
Record low °C (°F)	−25.7 (−14.3)	−28.3 (−18.9)	−22.6 (−8.7)	−11.6 (11.1)	−4.5 (23.9)	0.3 (32.5)	4.9 (40.8)	6.7 (44.1)	−0.2 (31.6)	−5.2 (22.6)	−12.4 (9.7)	−20.7 (−5.3)	−28.3 (−18.9)
Average precipitation mm (inches)	46.4 (1.83)	40.1 (1.58)	54.1 (2.13)	67.3 (2.65)	92.5 (3.64)	93.0 (3.66)	149.6 (5.89)	206.1 (8.11)	168.1 (6.62)	109.3 (4.30)	76.9 (3.03)	58.9 (2.32)	1,162.2 (45.76)
Average snowfall cm (inches)	121 (48)	112 (44)	123 (48)	26 (10)	3 (1.2)	0 (0)	0 (0)	0 (0)	0 (0)	1 (0.4)	26 (10)	107 (42)	517 (204)
Average precipitation days (≥ 1.0 mm)	8.7	8.3	10.5	11.2	11.7	11.0	13.9	13.8	13.2	11.8	11.6	9.5	135.3
Mean monthly sunshine hours	133.8	127.5	171.8	178.1	184.8	141.4	119.4	129.7	142.1	152.1	118.2	112.8	1,711.6

=== Demographics ===
Per Japanese census data, the population of Shintoku has declined in recent decades.

Historical population
Year	Pop.	±%
1970	11,089	—
1980	9,502	−14.3%
1990	8,412	−11.5%
2000	7,657	−9.0%
2010	6,642	−13.3%
2020	5,817	−12.4%

== History ==
Jomon period ruins remain on the eastern slope of the Sahoro Plateau and along the Tokachi River. The Shinnai Chashi, located near the confluence of the Pitaraushi and Sahoro Rivers, dates back to the Ainu culture period. Shintoku, located inland in the Tokachi region, was nominally part of Matsumae Domain, but was only settled by Japanese during the late Bakumatsu period. In the Meiji period, colonization efforts increased, with groups of settlers arriving from various parts of Japan. The village of Kuttori was established in 1915 under Hokkaido second-class town and village system. In 1923, it became a first-class village and was renamed Shintoku. It was raised to town status in 1933.

== Government ==
Shintoku has a mayor-council form of government with a directly elected mayor and a unicameral town council of 12 members. Shintoku, as part of Tokachi Subprefecture, contributes four members to the Hokkaidō Prefectural Assembly. In terms of national politics, the town is part of the Hokkaidō 11th district of the lower house of the Diet of Japan.

== Economy ==
The Shintoku area is known for its large-scale agriculture, including field crops, livestock, and dairy farming. Forestry is also a major industry, with the area boasting one of the largest lumber shipment volumes in the Tokachi region. Tourism takes advantage of the area's natural resources, including numerous hot springs and ski resorts.

== Education ==
Shintoku has two public elementary schools and two public middle schools, and one combined elementary/middle operated by the town. The town does not have a high school.

== Transportation ==
=== Railways ===
JR Hokkaido - Nemuro Main Line / Sekishō Line

■ Shintoku

=== Highways ===
- National Route 38

== Sister city relations ==
- Higashine, Yamagata, Japan

== Local attractions ==
- Karikachi Pass Observatory
- Karikachi Kogen Park
- Lake Sahoro
- Tokachi Dam
- Tomuraushi Natural Recreation Forest
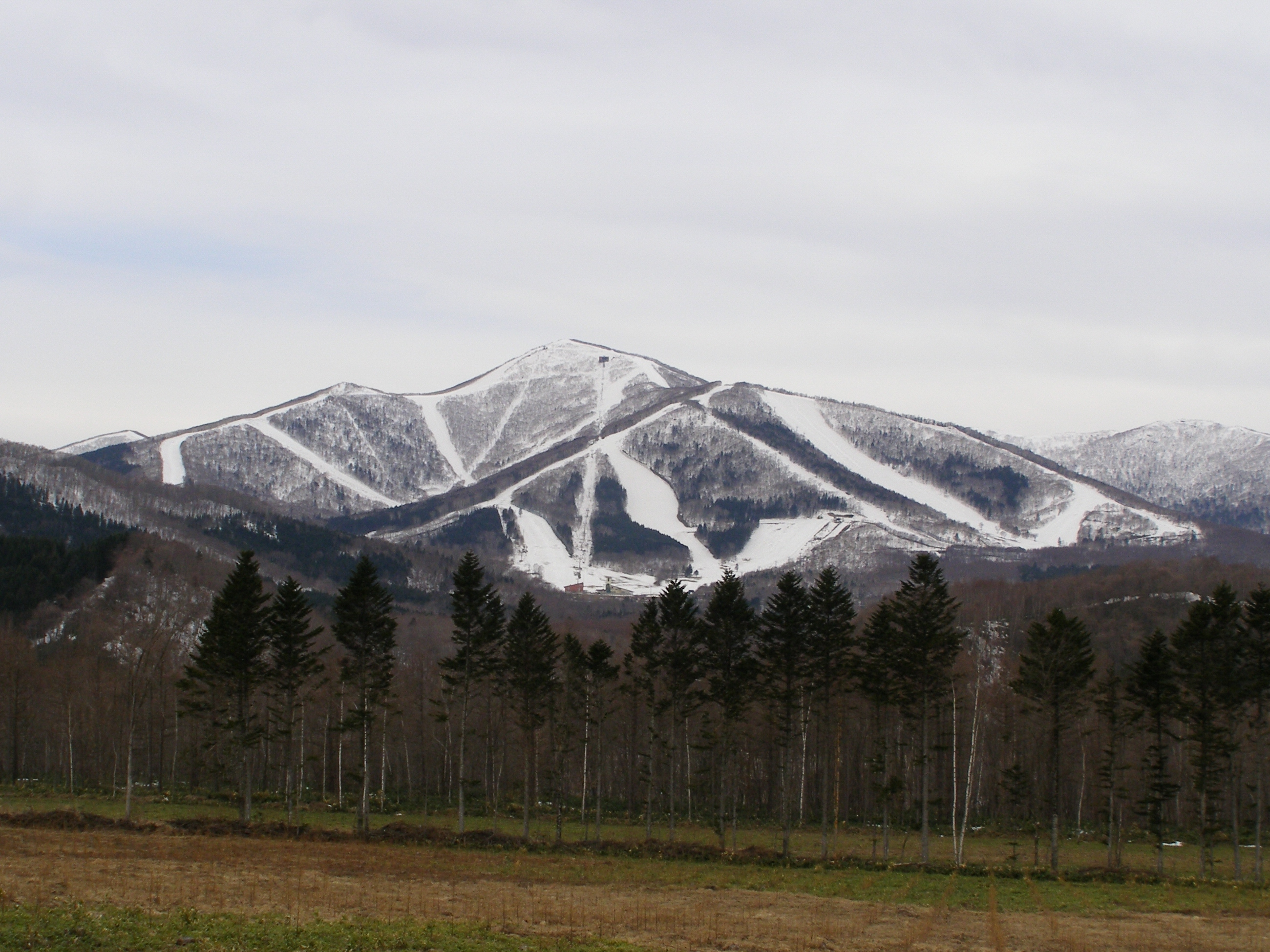
Sahoro ski resort

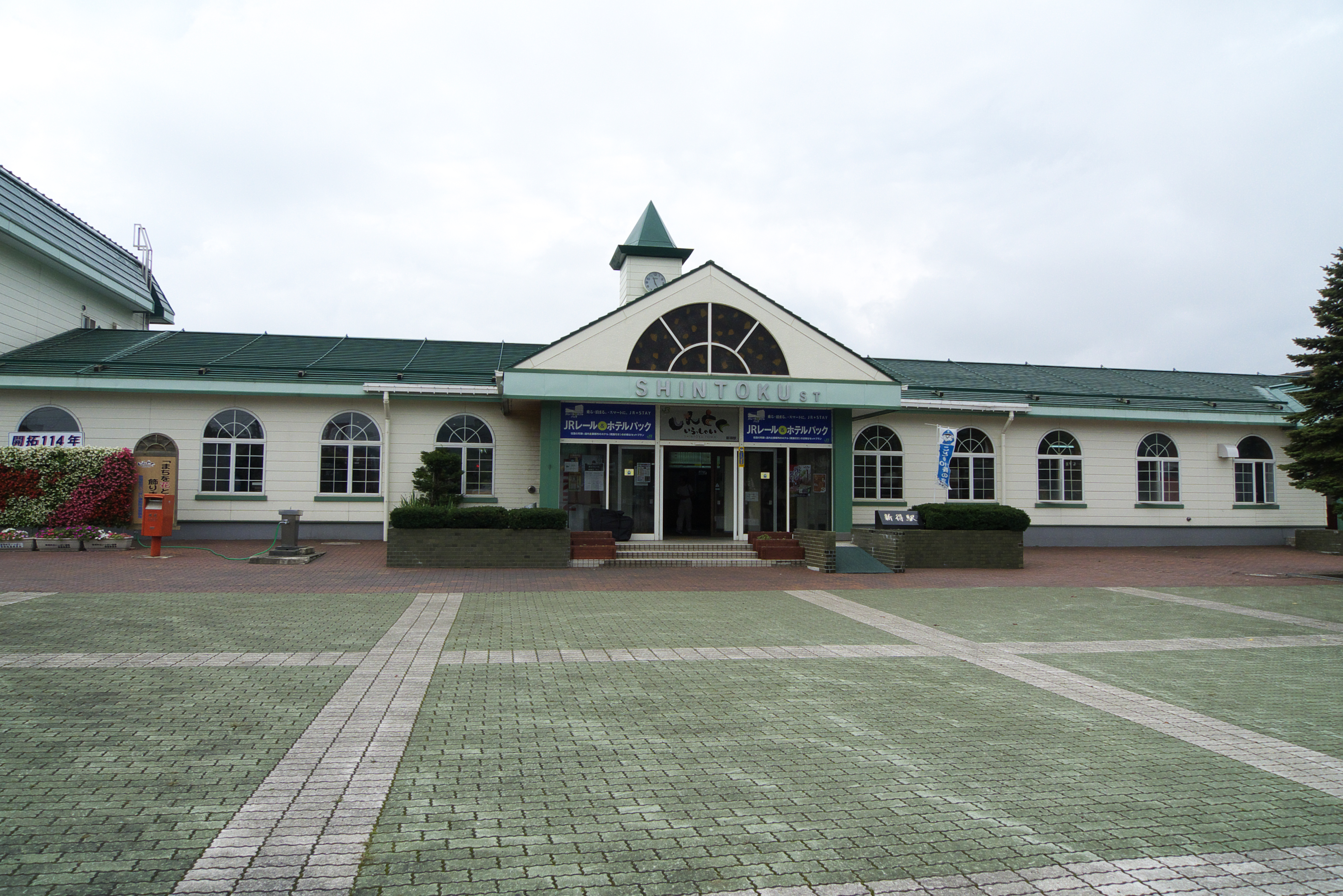
Shintoku Station

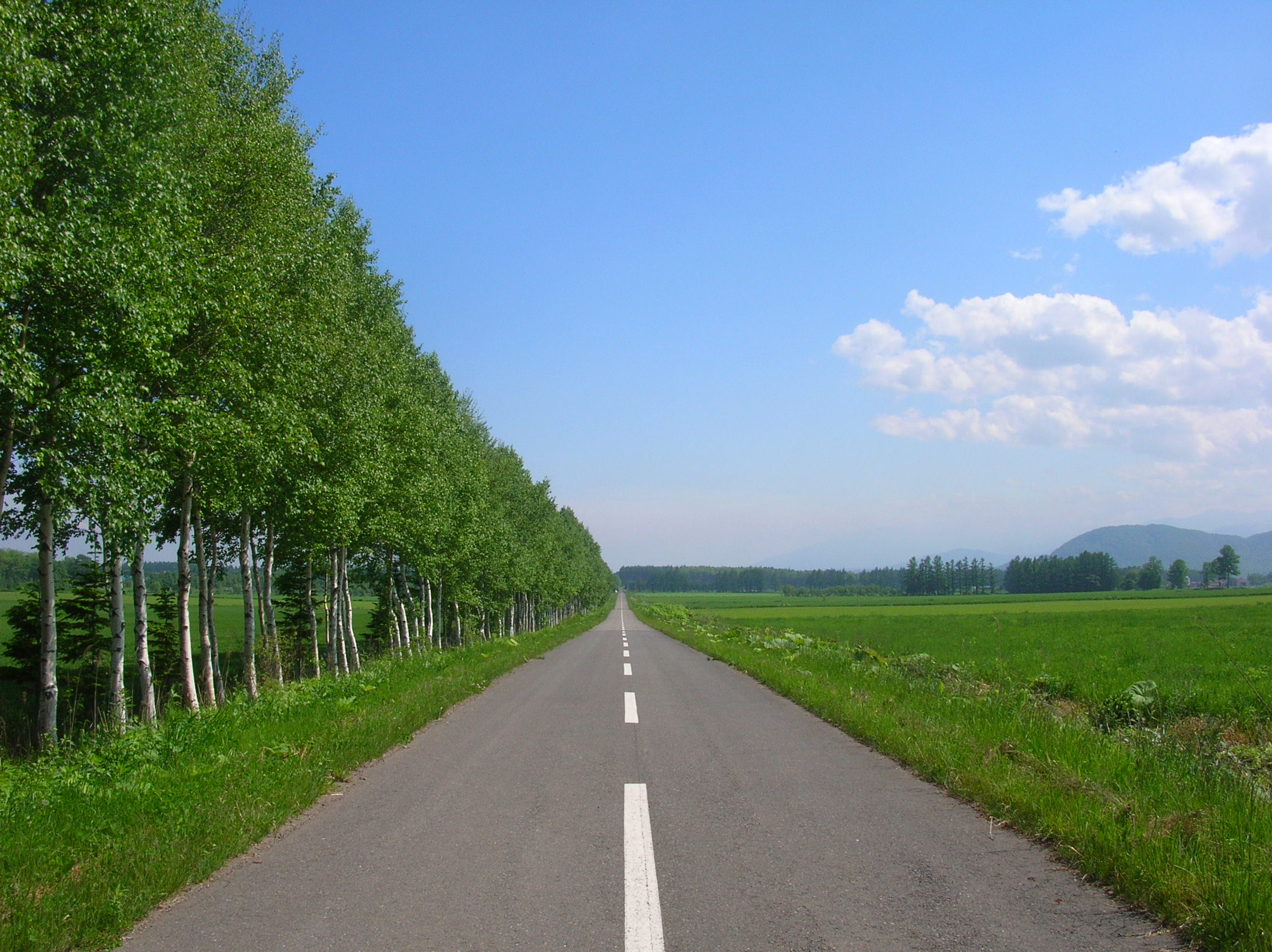
Panorama of Shintoku

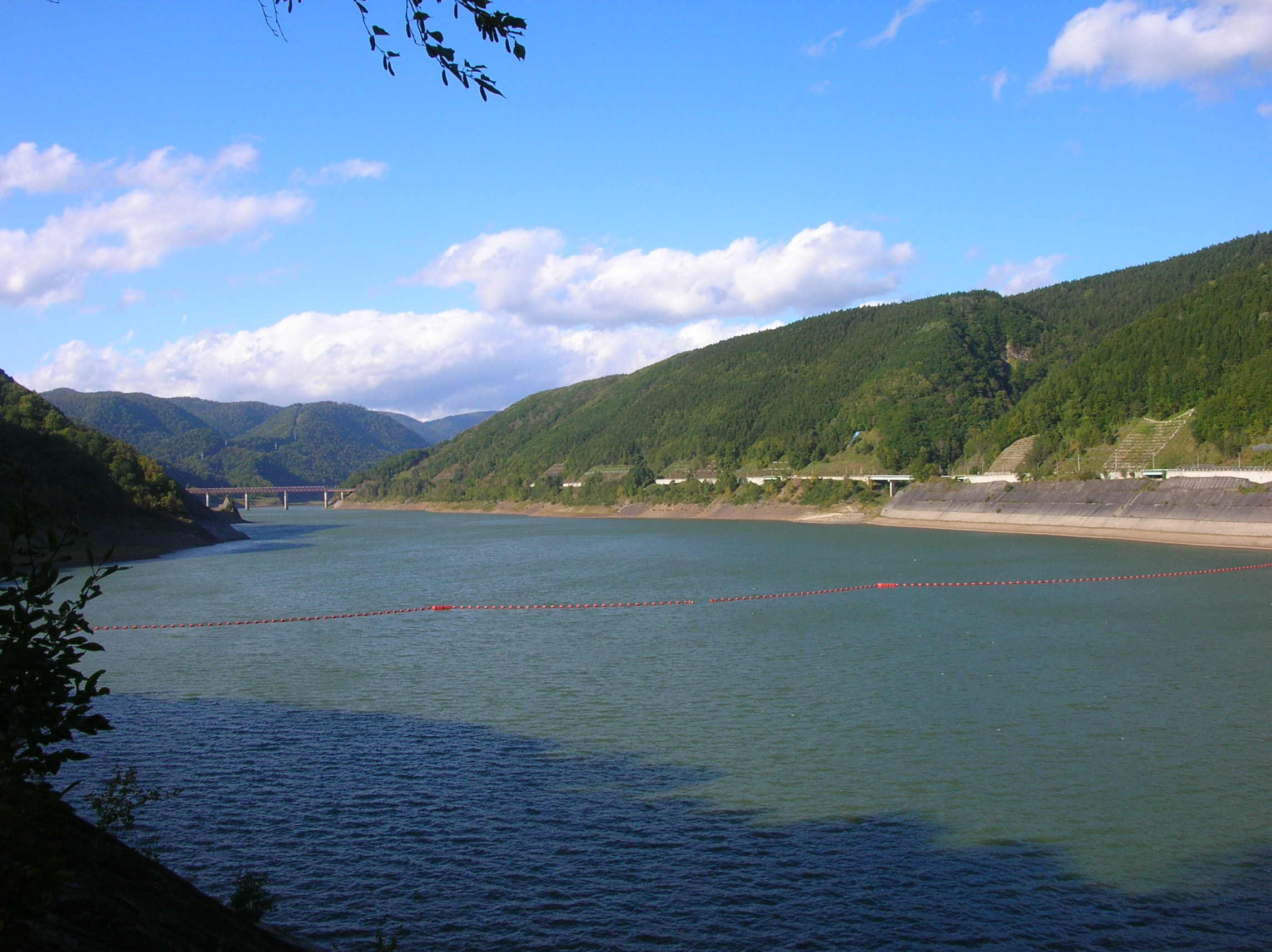
Lake Tokachi

== Sports ==
While Japan Bandy Federation was founded in 2011, there has not been any full-sized bandy field in the country. So domestically only the variety rink bandy has been played. However, in the summer of 2017 an association for bandy was founded in Shintoku and it was announced that a full-sized field will open in the 2017-2018 winter season. It became a reality in December 2017 and the first Japanese championship took place there in January 2018, with the home teams capturing the titles.

== Mascots ==
Kankou Sentai Shintokuranger, the town's mascots

Shintoku's mascots are the Kankou Sentai Shintokuranger (新得応援戦隊しんとくレンジャー, Kankō Sentai Shintokurenjā). They are based on toku heroes such as Super Sentai, Kamen Rider and Ultraman. The team consists of three members.

- SobaRed (そばレッド, SobaReddo) is the leader of the team who is from Shintoku. His motif is a soba. His job is to make sure all of the food (especially soba) had the best quality and cooked safe to prevent foodborne illnesses. His birthday is August 17.
- YamaGreen (山グリーン, YamaGurīn) is the second in command of the team who is from Mount Tomuraushi in the Shintoku Mountains. His motif is mountains such as Mount Tomuraushi and Mount Sahoro. His job is to protect nature and the environment from pollution. His birthday is on October 12.
- OnsenPink (温泉ピンク, OnsenPinku). She is the only female of the team who is from Shintoku but raised in the United States. Her motif is the onsen. His job is to heal people from diseases or injury while maintaining beauty and health. Her birthday is February 19.

In 2014, four more members were added as a result of a design competition.

- SobaRainbow (そばレインボー, SobaReinbō) who is a soba (like SobaRed but in colours of a rainbow)
- JidoriBrown (じどりブラウン, JidoriBuraun) who is a brown chicken.
- Chocoranger (チョコレンジャー, Chokorenjā) who is a princess of chocolate.
- Kuroranger (くろレンジャー, Kurorenjā) who is cat-like shadow figure that represents the night sky.
