= Memuro, Hokkaido =

Town in Japan

Memuro 芽室町 Memuro-chō
- Town
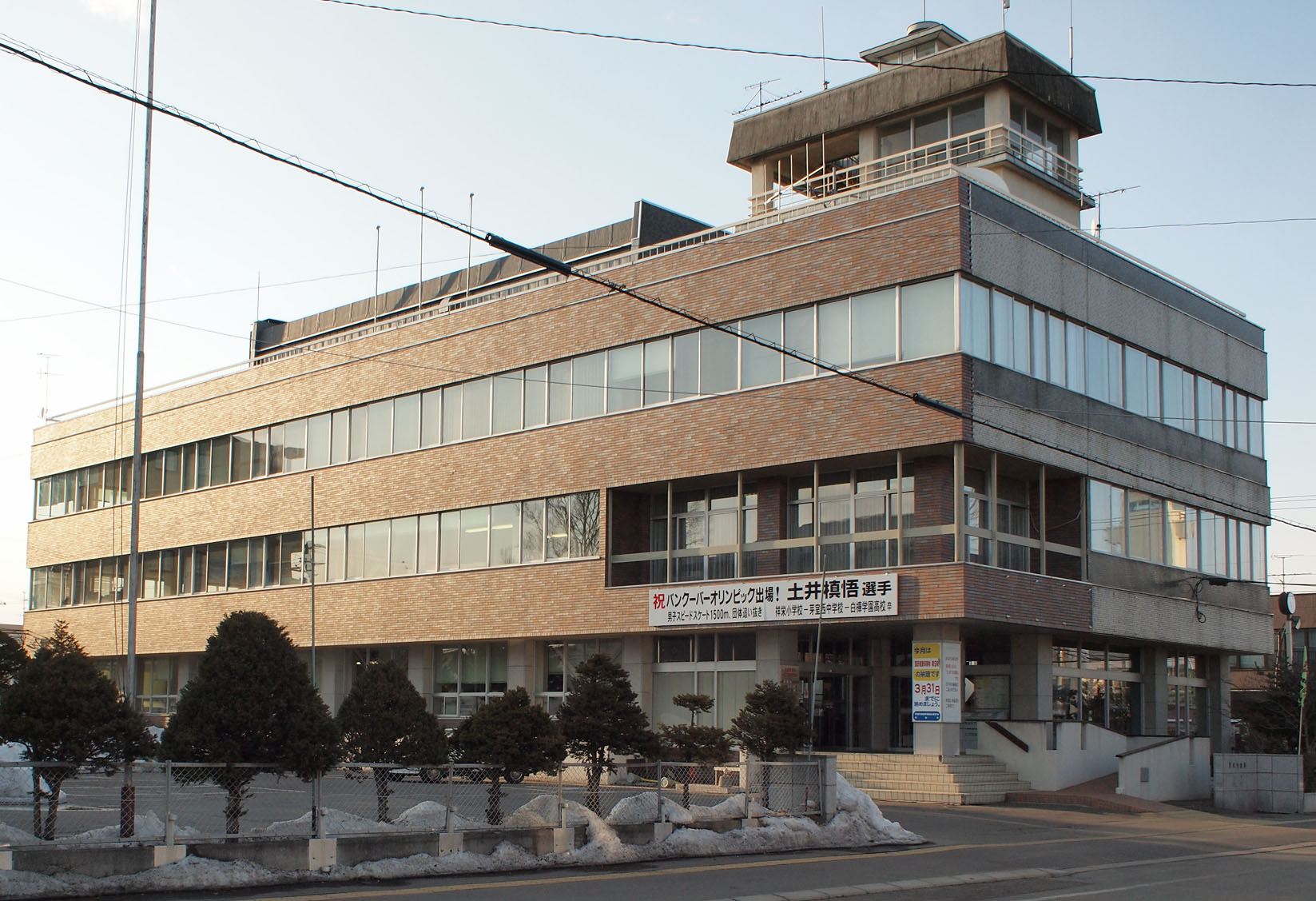
- former Memuro Town Hall (2010)

- Flag Emblem

- Location of Memuro in Hokkaido (Tokachi Subprefecture)
- Interactive map of Memuro
- Coordinates: 42°54′43″N 143°03′03″E
- Country: Japan
- Region: Hokkaido
- Prefecture: Hokkaido (Tokachi Subprefecture)
- District: Kasai

Area
  - Total: 513.76 km^{2} (198.36 sq mi)

Population (December 31, 2025)
  - Total: 17,573
  - Density: 34.205/km^{2} (88.590/sq mi)
- Time zone: UTC+09:00 (JST)
- City hall address: 14 Higashi 2-jo 2-chome, Memuro-cho, Kasai-gun, Hokkaido 082-8651
- Climate: Dfb
- Website: www.memuro.net
- Symbols
- Bird: Common cuckoo
- Flower: Asian skunk cabbage; Ezo Rhododendron
- Tree: Daimyo oak

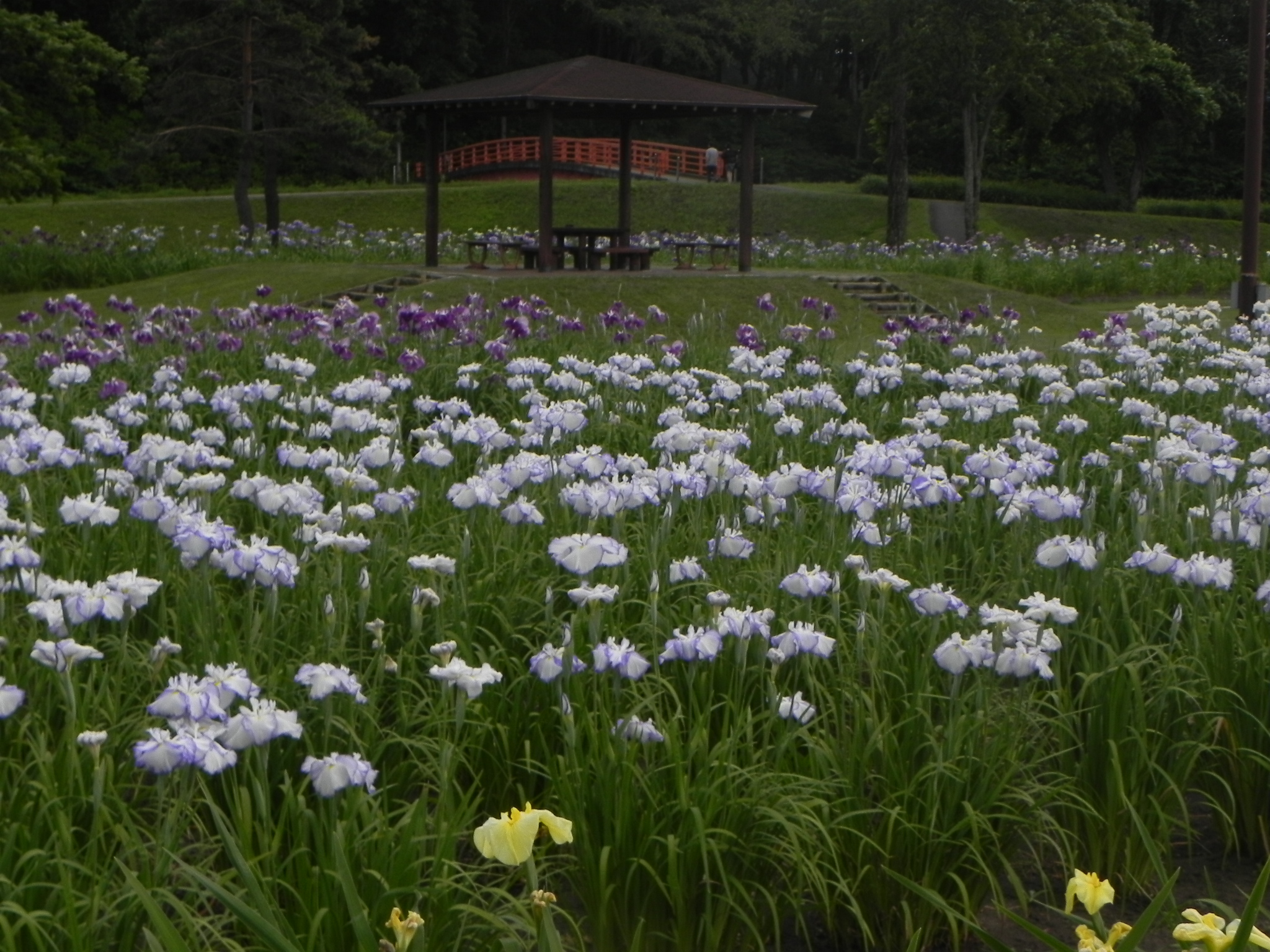
Memuro Park

Memuro (芽室町, Memuro-chō) is a town located in Tokachi Subprefecture, Hokkaidō, Japan. As of 31 December 2025, the town had an estimated population of 17,573 in 8051 households, and a population density of 34 people per km^{2}. The total area of the town is 513.76 km^{2} (198.36 sq mi).

== Geography ==
Memuro is located in southern Hokkaido in the western part of the Tokachi Plain, bordering Obihiro City to the southeast.The western part of the town is mountainous, originating from the Hidaka Mountains, and is designated as part of the Hidakasanmyaku-Erimo-Tokachi National Park. Mount Pipairo, at 1917 meters, is the highest point in the town.

=== Neighboring municipalities ===
  - Obihiro
  - Otofuke
  - Shikaoi
  - Shimizu
  - Hidaka

=== Climate ===
According to the Köppen climate classification, Memuro has a humid continental climate. Its climate is characterized by large temperature differences, with large annual and daily temperature ranges. It receives a lot of snow, making it a designated heavy snow area. In winter, temperatures below -25 °C are not uncommon, making it extremely cold. On February 4, 2025, the six-hour snowfall reached 87 cm, the highest in Japan since records began.

Climate data for Memuro（1991 - 2020）
Month	Jan	Feb	Mar	Apr	May	Jun	Jul	Aug	Sep	Oct	Nov	Dec	Year
Record high °C (°F)	8.2 (46.8)	11.7 (53.1)	16.5 (61.7)	30.7 (87.3)	38.1 (100.6)	36.3 (97.3)	37.7 (99.9)	36.8 (98.2)	33.2 (91.8)	28.0 (82.4)	20.7 (69.3)	14.9 (58.8)	38.1 (100.6)
Mean daily maximum °C (°F)	−2.2 (28.0)	−1.1 (30.0)	3.7 (38.7)	11.4 (52.5)	17.7 (63.9)	21.1 (70.0)	24.1 (75.4)	25.1 (77.2)	21.6 (70.9)	15.4 (59.7)	7.8 (46.0)	0.4 (32.7)	12.1 (53.8)
Daily mean °C (°F)	−8.3 (17.1)	−7.3 (18.9)	−1.6 (29.1)	5.3 (41.5)	11.2 (52.2)	15.0 (59.0)	18.7 (65.7)	19.8 (67.6)	16.1 (61.0)	9.4 (48.9)	2.6 (36.7)	−4.9 (23.2)	6.3 (43.3)
Mean daily minimum °C (°F)	−15.9 (3.4)	−15.4 (4.3)	−7.9 (17.8)	−0.6 (30.9)	5.0 (41.0)	10.0 (50.0)	14.5 (58.1)	15.7 (60.3)	11.3 (52.3)	3.7 (38.7)	−2.6 (27.3)	−11.3 (11.7)	0.5 (32.9)
Record low °C (°F)	−29.9 (−21.8)	−31.3 (−24.3)	−27.6 (−17.7)	−15.6 (3.9)	−4.2 (24.4)	−0.1 (31.8)	4.5 (40.1)	6.0 (42.8)	0.1 (32.2)	−4.8 (23.4)	−17.4 (0.7)	−26.0 (−14.8)	−31.3 (−24.3)
Average precipitation mm (inches)	43.5 (1.71)	31.7 (1.25)	48.3 (1.90)	60.9 (2.40)	82.8 (3.26)	83.0 (3.27)	111.8 (4.40)	152.8 (6.02)	150.6 (5.93)	90.1 (3.55)	61.7 (2.43)	54.6 (2.15)	971.6 (38.25)
Average snowfall cm (inches)	99 (39)	81 (32)	83 (33)	18 (7.1)	1 (0.4)	0 (0)	0 (0)	0 (0)	0 (0)	0 (0)	19 (7.5)	93 (37)	396 (156)
Average precipitation days (≥ 1.0 mm)	6.1	5.2	7.2	8.3	9.3	9.1	10.9	11.3	11.2	8.8	7.8	6.8	101.9
Mean monthly sunshine hours	152.3	156.6	202.5	189.9	181.8	143.3	119.5	122.6	140.0	161.8	147.7	136.7	1,854.8

=== Demographics ===
Per Japanese census data, the population had been increasing due to an influx of people from the Tokachi region and residential development in the Higashi-Memuro area, which began in 2002, but has been declining in recent years.

Historical population
Year	Pop.	±%
1970	15,571	—
1980	16,580	+6.5%
1990	16,577	−0.0%
2000	17,586	+6.1%
2010	18,897	+7.5%
2020	18,048	−4.5%

== History ==
The first time "Memuro" appears in written history is on a map by Minagawa Shushudayu, who surveyed the Tokachi River in 1800. At the time, it was listed as one of the 40 kotan (Ainu settlements) that existed in Tokachi. "Memoro" is thought to come from the Ainu word "memu oro pets" ("river where a spring flows").The first Japanese settlers arrived in the Memoru area in 1886. Mimuro village was established in 1906 under the Hokkaido second-class town and village system. It was raised to a first-class village in 1919 and to a town in 1942.

== Government ==
Memuro has a mayor-council form of government with a directly elected mayor and a unicameral town council of 16 members. Memuro, as part of Tokachi Subprefecture, contributes four members to the Hokkaidō Prefectural Assembly. In terms of national politics, the town is part of the Hokkaidō 11th district of the lower house of the Diet of Japan.

== Economy ==
With fertile soil and favorable climate, Memuro's economy is centered on agriculture, especially large-scale field farming. Memuro's representative crops, wheat, potatoes, red beans, sugar beets, and sweet corn. Approximately 230 companies are located in the Memuro East Industrial Park, many of which are food processors.

== Education ==
Memuro has four public elementary schools and three public middle schools operated by the town. The town has one public high school operated by the Hokkaido Board of Education, and one private high school. The Hokkaido Prefectural Tokachi Agricultural Experiment Station is located in Memuro.

== Transportation ==
=== Railways ===
JR Hokkaido - Nemuro Main Line

■ Memuro - Taisei

=== Highways ===
- Dōtō Expressway
- Obihiro-Hiroo Expressway
- National Route 38

== Noted people from Memuro ==
- Ōnokuni Yasushi, sumo yokozuka
- Karikachi Kogen Park
- Lake Sahoro
- Tokachi Dam
- Tomuraushi Natural Recreation Forest
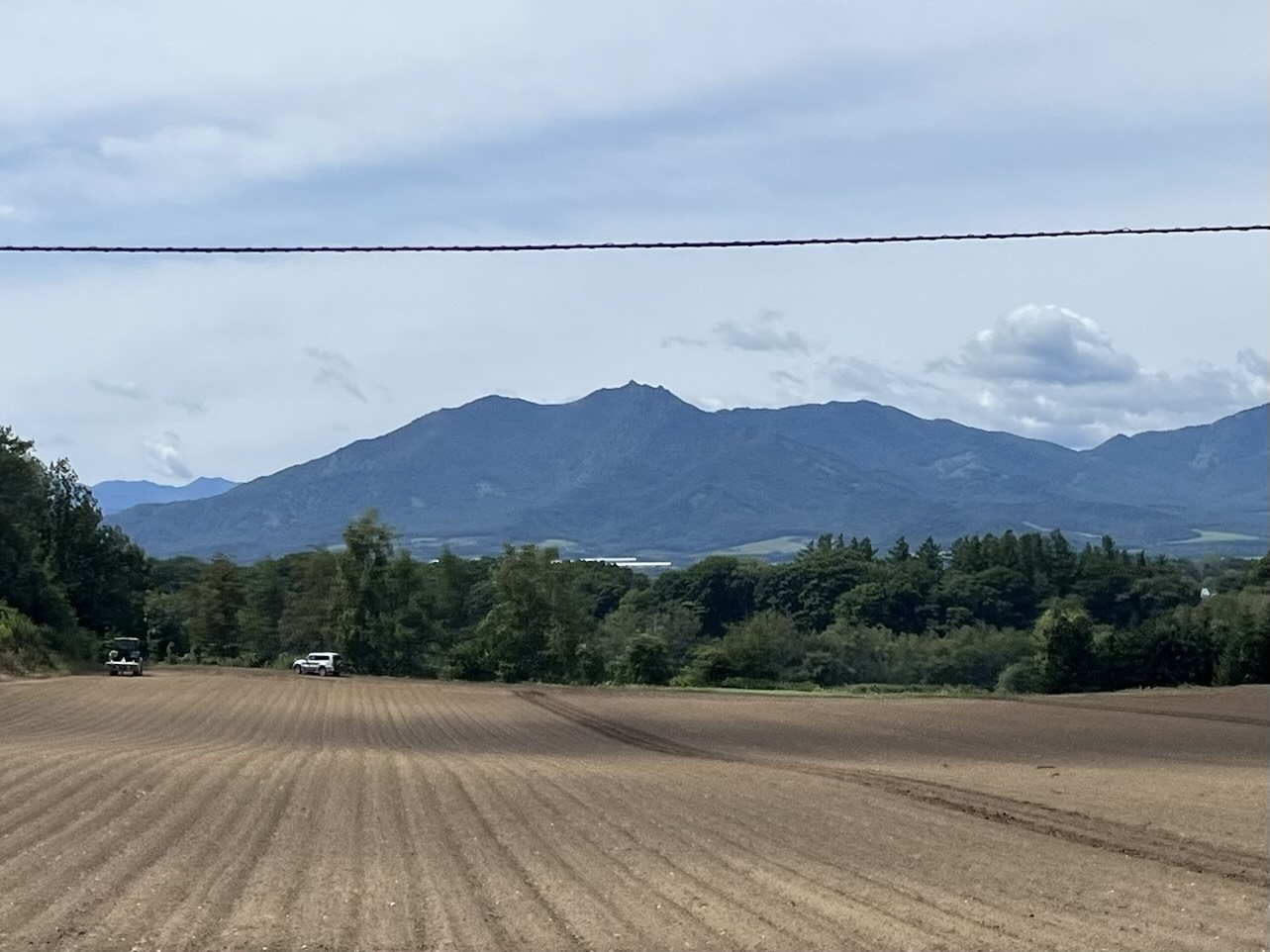
Mt. Tsurugiyama

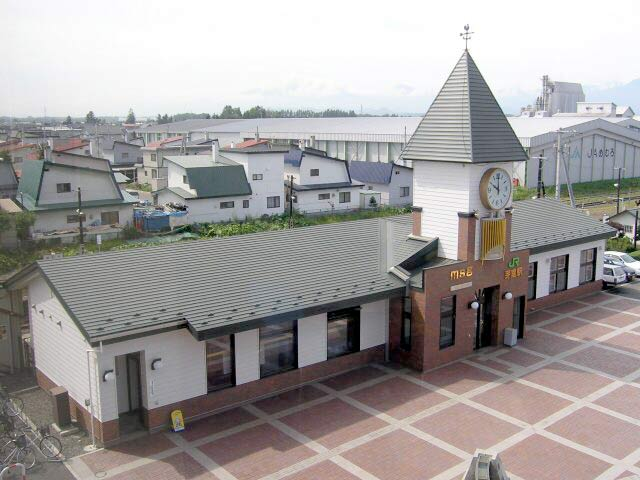
Memuro Station

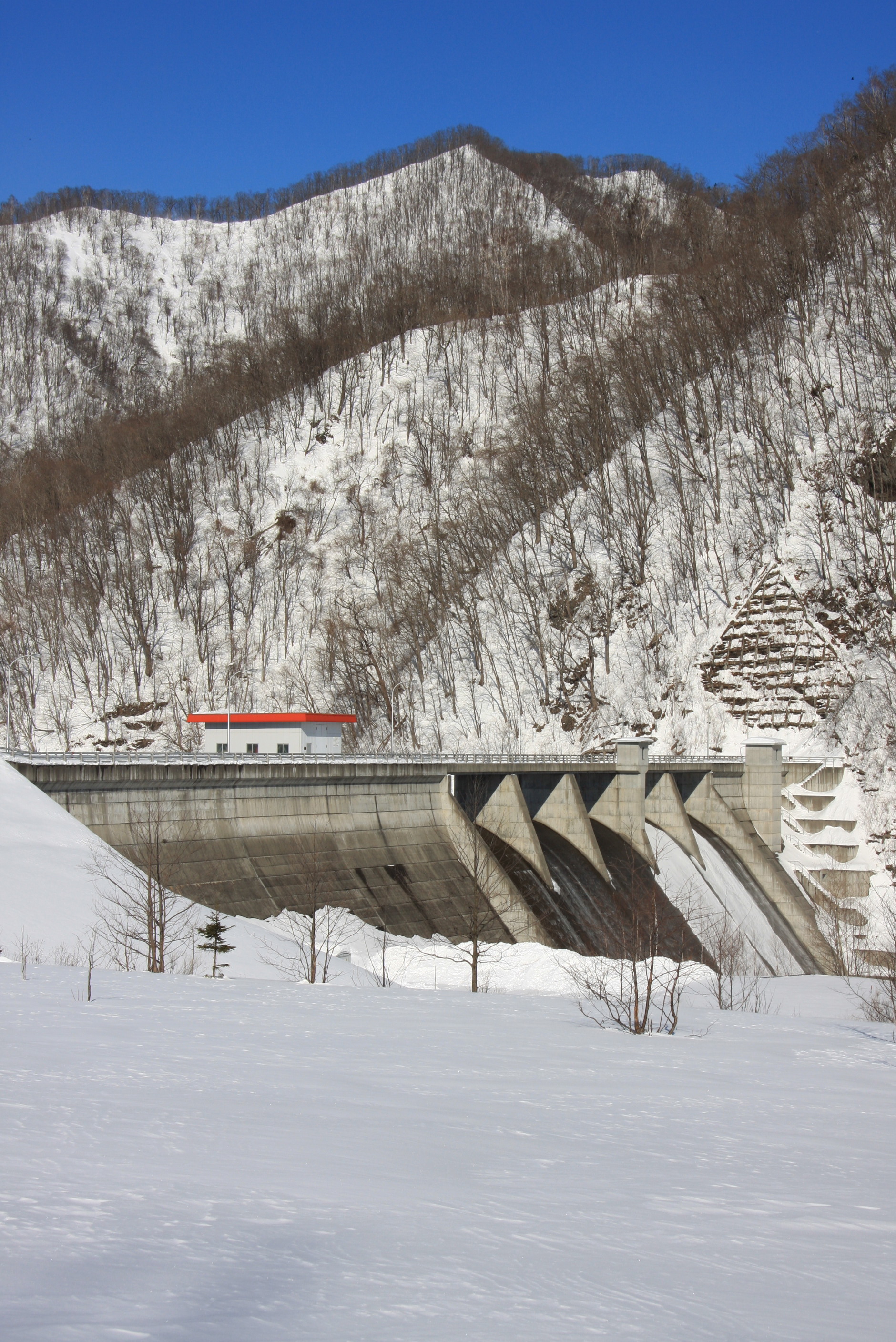
Bisei Dam

== Sister city relations ==
- Tracy, California, United States since 1989.
