= Phyllonorycter rhododendrella =

Scientific classification
- Domain: Eukaryota
- Kingdom: Animalia
- Phylum: Arthropoda
- Class: Insecta
- Order: Lepidoptera
- Family: Gracillariidae
- Genus: Phyllonorycter
- Species: P. rhododendrella

Binomial name
- Phyllonorycter rhododendrella (Braun, 1935)

Synonyms
- Phyllonorycter rhododrendrella Braun, 1935

Species of moth

Phyllonorycter rhododendrella is a moth of the family Gracillariidae. It is known from Tennessee, United States.

The larvae feed on Rhododendron carolinianum and Rhododendron punctatum.
