= Mikage, Hokkaido =

Dissolved municipality in Kasai district, Hokkaido, Japan

Mikage (御影村, Mikage-mura) is a former village that was located in the Kasai District of Hokkaido Prefecture, Japan. The village was formed in 1921 when it separated from the village of Memuro. It was named after the granite which was mined in the area, which is sometimes called mikageishi (御影石) in Japanese. In October 1922 the train station within the village was renamed to Mikage Station and telephone service was installed in 1923. The village opened public junior and senior high schools in 1947 and 1951 respectively. In 1956 it merged with the neighbouring town of Shimizu.
