= Tokachi-Shimizu Station =

Railway station in Shimizu, Hokkaido, Japan

K24 Tokachi-Shimizu Station 十勝清水駅
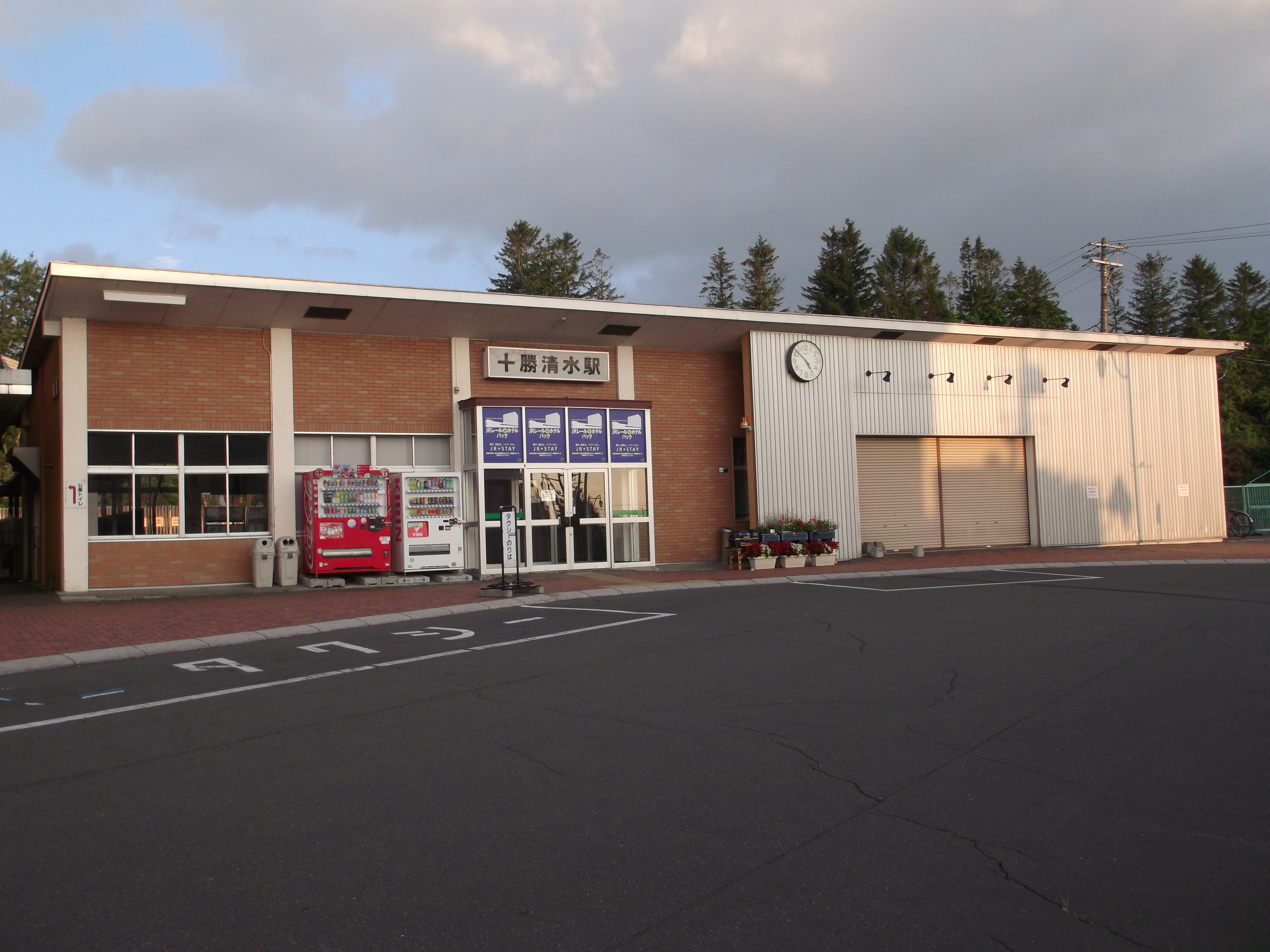
- Tokachi-Shimizu Station (28 July 2012)

General information
- Location: 1 Chome Hondori, Shimizu, Kamikawa District, Hokkaido 089-0136; Japan
- Coordinates: 43°0′49.67″N 142°52′47.24″E
- System: regional rail
- Operator: JR Hokkaido
- Line: Nemuro Main Line
- Distance: 9.1km from Shintoku
- Platforms: 1 island platform
- Tracks: 2

Construction
- Structure type: At-grade
- Accessible: No

Other information
- Status: Staffed (Midori no Madoguchi )
- Station code: K24
- Website: Official website

History
- Opened: 8 September 1907; 119 years ago

Passengers
- FY2018: 570 daily

Services
Preceding station	JR Hokkaido	Following station
Shintoku towards Takikawa	Nemuro Main Line Local	Mikage towards Nemuro
Location
- Location within Hokkaido Location within Japan

Tokachi-Shimizu Station (十勝清水駅, Tokachi-Shimizu-eki) is a railway station located in the town of Shimizu, Kamikawa District, Hokkaidō, It is operated by JR Hokkaido.

== Lines ==
The station is served by the Nemuro Main Line, and lies 9.1 km from the starting point of the line at Shintoku.

== Layout ==
Tokachi-Shimizu station has one island platform and two tracks connected by a footbridge. Regular trains use track 1, the main track closest to the station building, and track 2 is used only for interchanges. The station building is located on the east side of the station premises and has a Midori no Madoguchi staffed ticket office. There used to be a freight platform on the south side of the station building, as well as dedicated tracks to the JA Tokachi-Shimizu-cho warehouse on the west side of the Nemuro Main Line south of the station, the Nippon Beet Sugar Shimizu Factory on the east side of the main line, and the Hokuren Shimizu Sugar Factory on the north side of the station. However, all of these were abolished by November 1, 1986.

=== Platforms ===
1	■ Nemuro Main Line	for Obihiro and Ikeda
2	■ Nemuro Main Line	for Shintoku and Sapporo

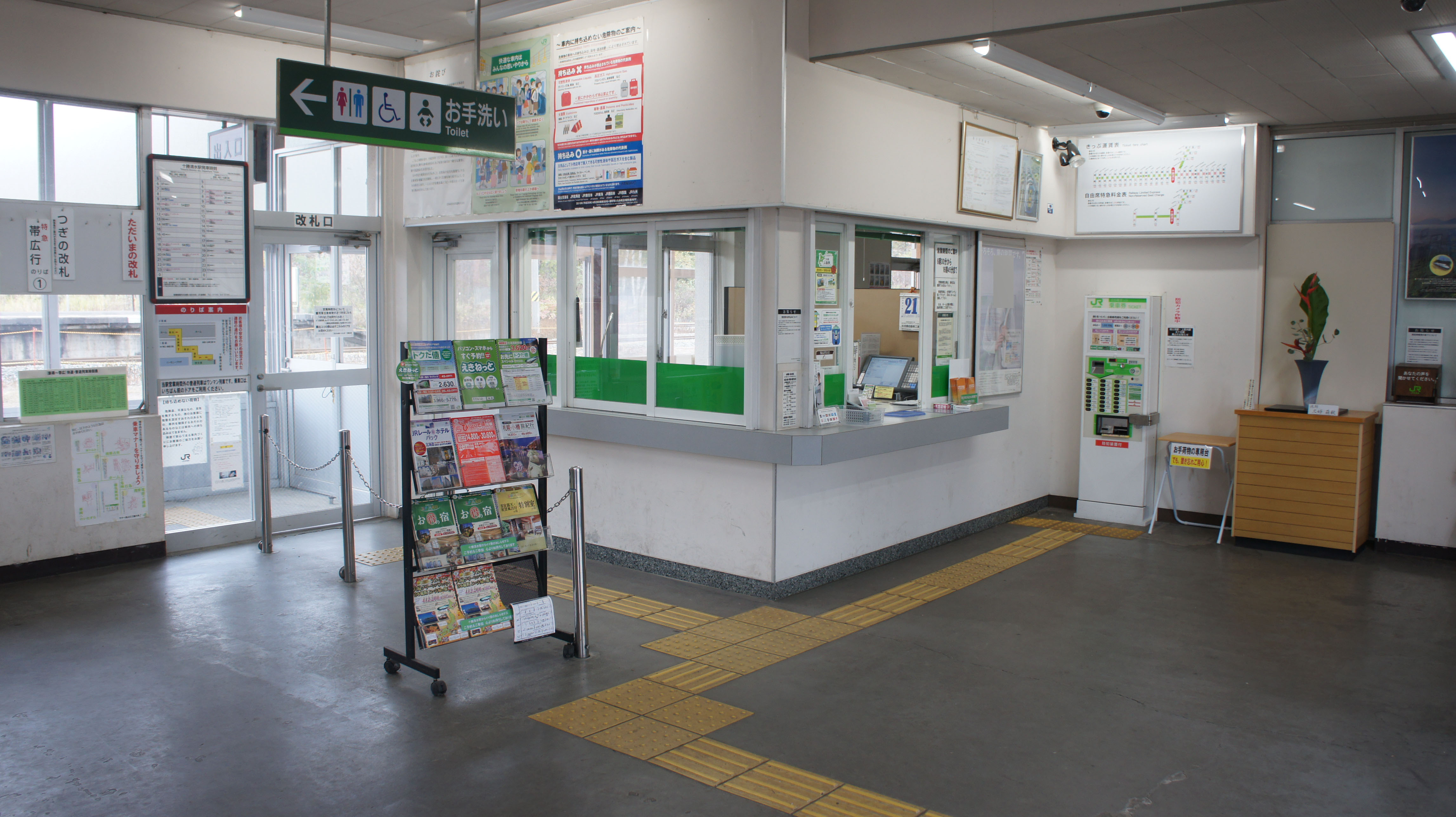
Ticket office

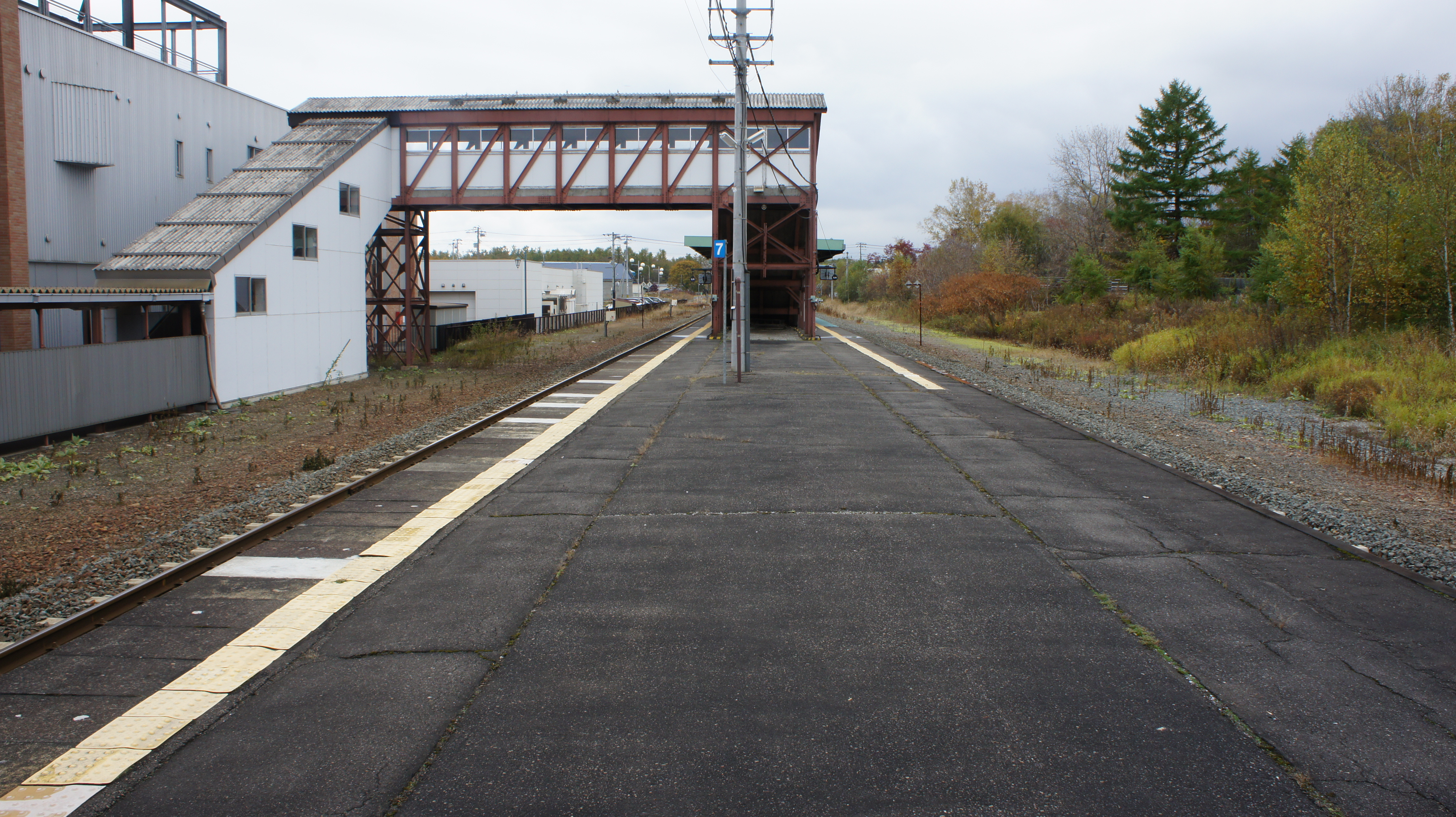
Platforms

== History ==
The station opened on 8 September 1907 as Shimizu Station on the Japanese Government Railways. It was renamed to its present name on 20 November 1934. With the privatization of the Japan National Railway (JNR) on 1 April 1987, the station came under the aegis of the Hokkaido Railway Company (JR Hokkaido).

== Passenger statistics ==
In fiscal 2018, the station was used by under 570 passengers daily.。

== Surrounding area ==
- Japan National Route 38
- Japan National Route 274
- Shimizu Town Hall

== See also ==
- List of railway stations in Japan
