= Mikage Station =

Mikage Station is the name of three train stations in Japan:

- Mikage Station (Hokkaidō) on the JR Hokkaido Nemuro Main Line in Shimizu, Hokkaidō, Kamikawa District, Hokkaidō
- Mikage Station (Hankyu) on the Hankyu Railway Kobe Line in Higashinada-ku, Kobe
- Mikage Station (Hanshin) on the Hanshin Electric Railway Main Line in Higashinada-ku, Kobe
