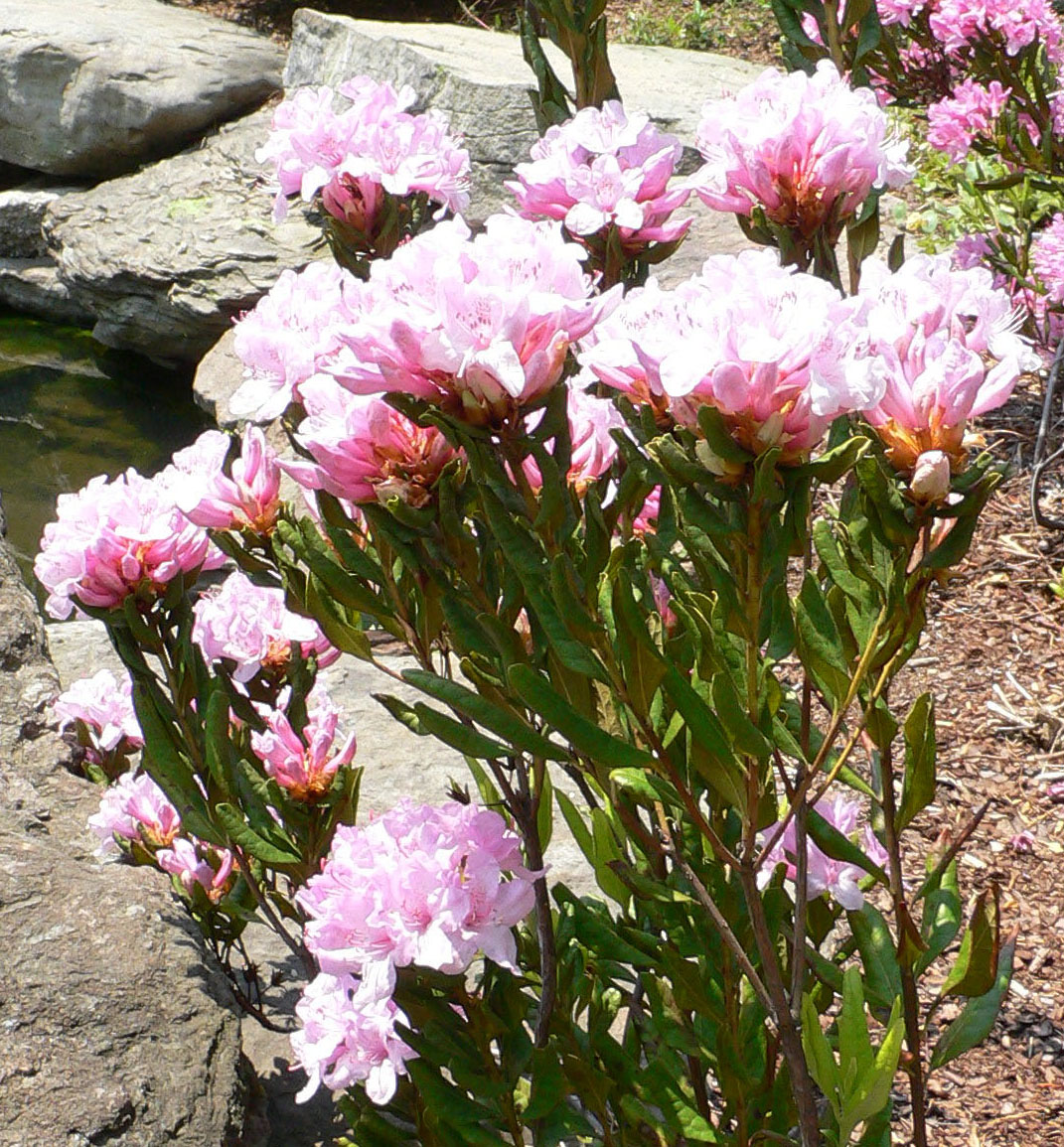

Conservation status
- Critically Imperiled (NatureServe)

- Endangered (ESA)

Scientific classification
- Kingdom: Plantae
- Clade: Tracheophytes
- Clade: Angiosperms
- Clade: Eudicots
- Clade: Asterids
- Order: Ericales
- Family: Ericaceae
- Genus: Rhododendron
- Species: R. minus
- Variety: R. m. var. chapmanii

Trinomial name
- Rhododendron minus var. chapmanii (Alph.Wood) Gandhi & Zarucchi

Synonyms
- Azalea chapmanii (Alph. Wood) Kuntze; Rhododendron chapmanii (Alph. Wood) A. Gray; Rhododendron minus var. chapmanii (Alph. Wood) W.H. Duncan & Pullen; Rhododendron punctatum var. chapmanii Alph. Wood

= Rhododendron minus var. chapmanii =

Chapman's rhododendron

Variety of plant

Rhododendron minus var. chapmanii (syn. Rhododendron chapmanii), also known as Chapman's rhododendron, is an endangered variety, endemic to Florida, of the evergreen Piedmont rhododendron.

== Description ==
Chapman's rhododendron grows to 2 metres tall and has an erect habit. New growth is red-brown, turning gray with age. The leaves are elliptic and are 3 to 6.5 cm long. Pink flowers with five petals and 10 stamens appear in the spring (March to April in Florida).

== Distribution ==
There are three separate populations of the species within Florida, one in Clay County, the second in Gulf County and the third on the county line of Gadsden and Liberty counties.

== Taxonomy ==
Per Gandhi and Zarucchi, Duncan and Pullen incorrectly made a full citation to Asa Gray's proposal for a new combination Rhododendron chapmanii in support of naming Rhododendron minus var. chapmanii, as Gray had cited Alphonso Wood's prior valid publication of Rhododendron punctatum var. chapmanii as his basionym. Duncan and Pullen's 1962 publication of Rhododendron minus var. chapmanii was held to be invalid by Gandhi and Zarucchi under the Vienna Code for plant taxonomic nomenclature, which does not allow for indirect references to a basionym to be made for publications of new combinations in 1953 or later (a full citation would be required to the original source).
