= Nisshō Pass =

- 日勝峠
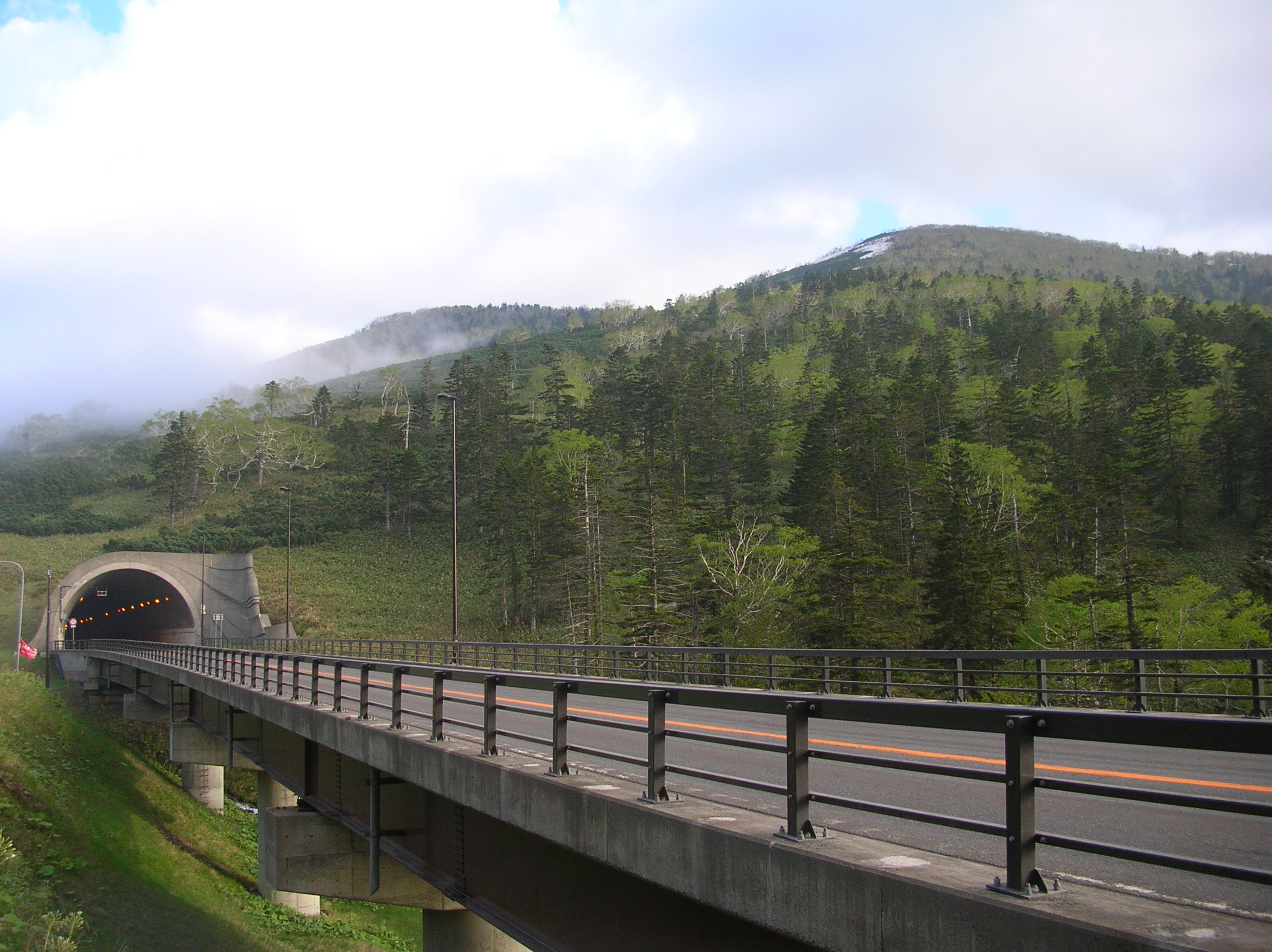
- Interactive map of Nisshō Pass
- Elevation: 1,022 metres (3,353 ft)
- Traversed by: Japan National Route 274

Third Approach
- Location: Japan
- Range: Hidaka Mountains
- Coordinates: 42°58′52″N 142°45′9″E
- Topo map: Geographical Survey Institute; 25000:1 十勝石山; 25000:1 沙流岳; 50000:1 千栄; 50000:1 御影

Nisshō Pass (日勝峠, Nisshō-tōge) is a mountain pass 1,022 metres (3,353 ft) high at the north-end of the Hidaka Mountains of Hokkaidō, Japan. The east side feeds into the Tokachi River system and the west side the Saru River system.

== Overview ==
The area is an important route connecting central and eastern Hokkaido. Although the elevation is only 1,022m, the vegetation and natural environment is comparable to that of 3,000m class mountain areas in Honshu, and driving conditions can be treacherous. Visibility is often impaired due to heavy fog or snowstorms, depending on the season, and the 33.3-km section from Ōdai bridge in Hidaka to Ishiyama in Shimizu is designated a special traffic regulation zone, resulting in measures to improve visibility, and prevent snow and ice on the road surface. Uphill lanes for slow vehicles and emergency lanes for vehicles with brake failure have also been installed. Travel along this route was somewhat eased in 2011 when the East Hokkaido Expressway was connected to central Hokkaido.

== Outline ==
The roadbed traverses the pass through the Nisshō Pass Tunnel at 1,022 metres (3,353 ft). The pass is 33.5 kilometres (20.8 mi) long. The road is 5.5 metres (18 ft) wide with a maximum grade of 6.2%. The minimum curve radius is 50 metres (160 ft). Snow is possible on the pass from October to May. Japan National Route 274 crosses the pass between Hidaka and Shimizu.
