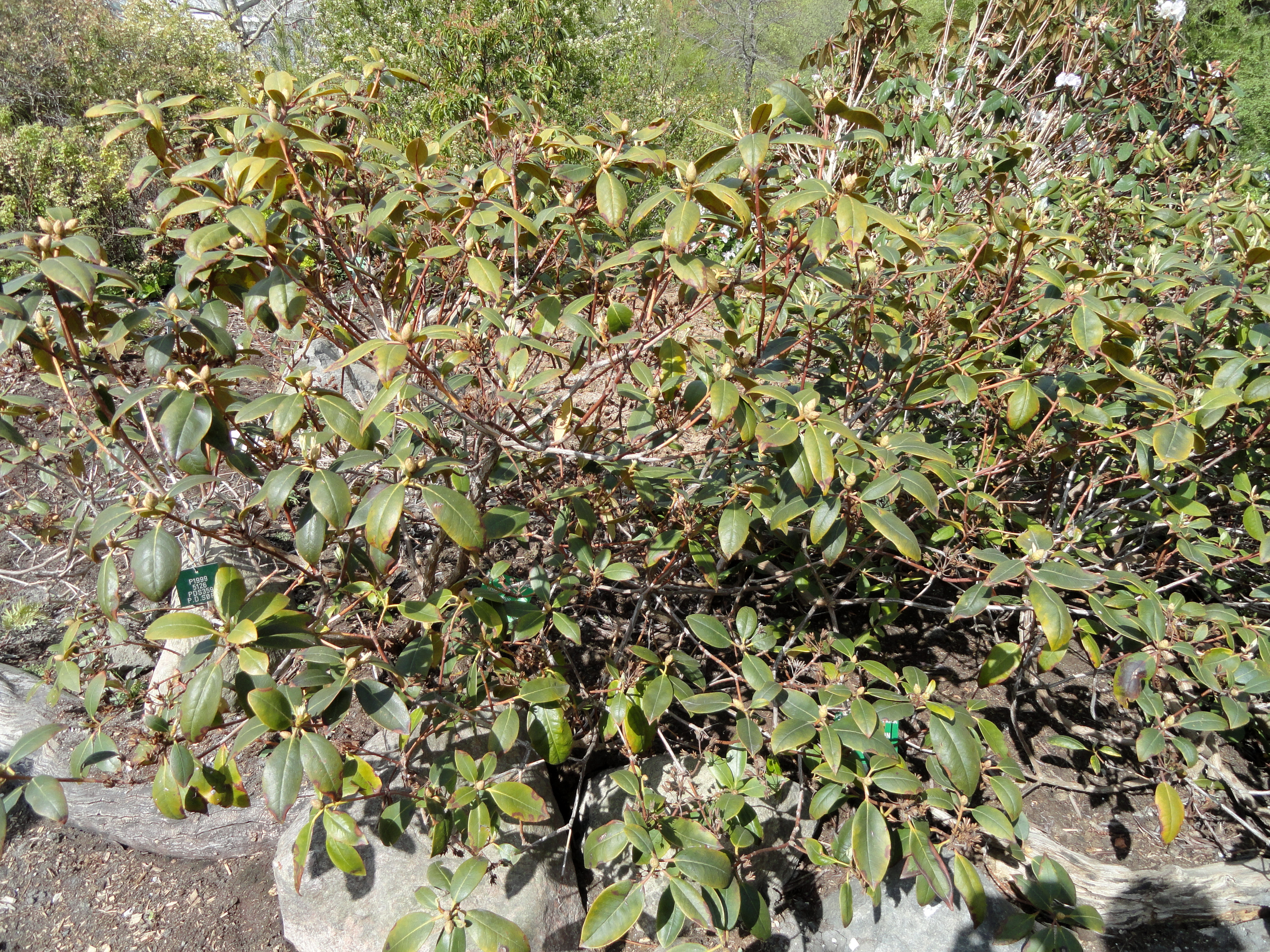

Scientific classification
- Kingdom: Plantae
- Clade: Tracheophytes
- Clade: Angiosperms
- Clade: Eudicots
- Clade: Asterids
- Order: Ericales
- Family: Ericaceae
- Genus: Rhododendron
- Species: R. minus

Binomial name
- Rhododendron minus Michx.

Synonyms
- Azalea minor (Michx.) Kuntze; Rhododendron parviflorum DC; Rhododendron carolinianum Rehder; Rhododendron cuthbertii Small; Rhododendron punctatum Andrews; Rhododendron margarettae (Ashe) Ashe

= Rhododendron minus =

Species of plant

Rhododendron minus, the Piedmont rhododendron, is a rhododendron species native to Tennessee, North Carolina, South Carolina, Georgia, and Alabama. It has two varieties:

Image	Name	Distribution
	Rhododendron minus var. chapmanii	Florida
	Rhododendron minus var. minus (the latter also known as Rhododendron carolinianum).	North Carolina, South Carolina, Tennessee, and Northeast Georgia

== Bibliography ==
- Fl. Bor.-Amer. 1: 258 1803.
- The Plant List: Rhododendron minus
- ITIS
- Hirsutum.com
- USDA PLANTS Profile
- North Carolina State University: Rhododendron minus
