= Shimizu, Hokkaido =

Shimizu 清水町 Shimizu-chō
- Town
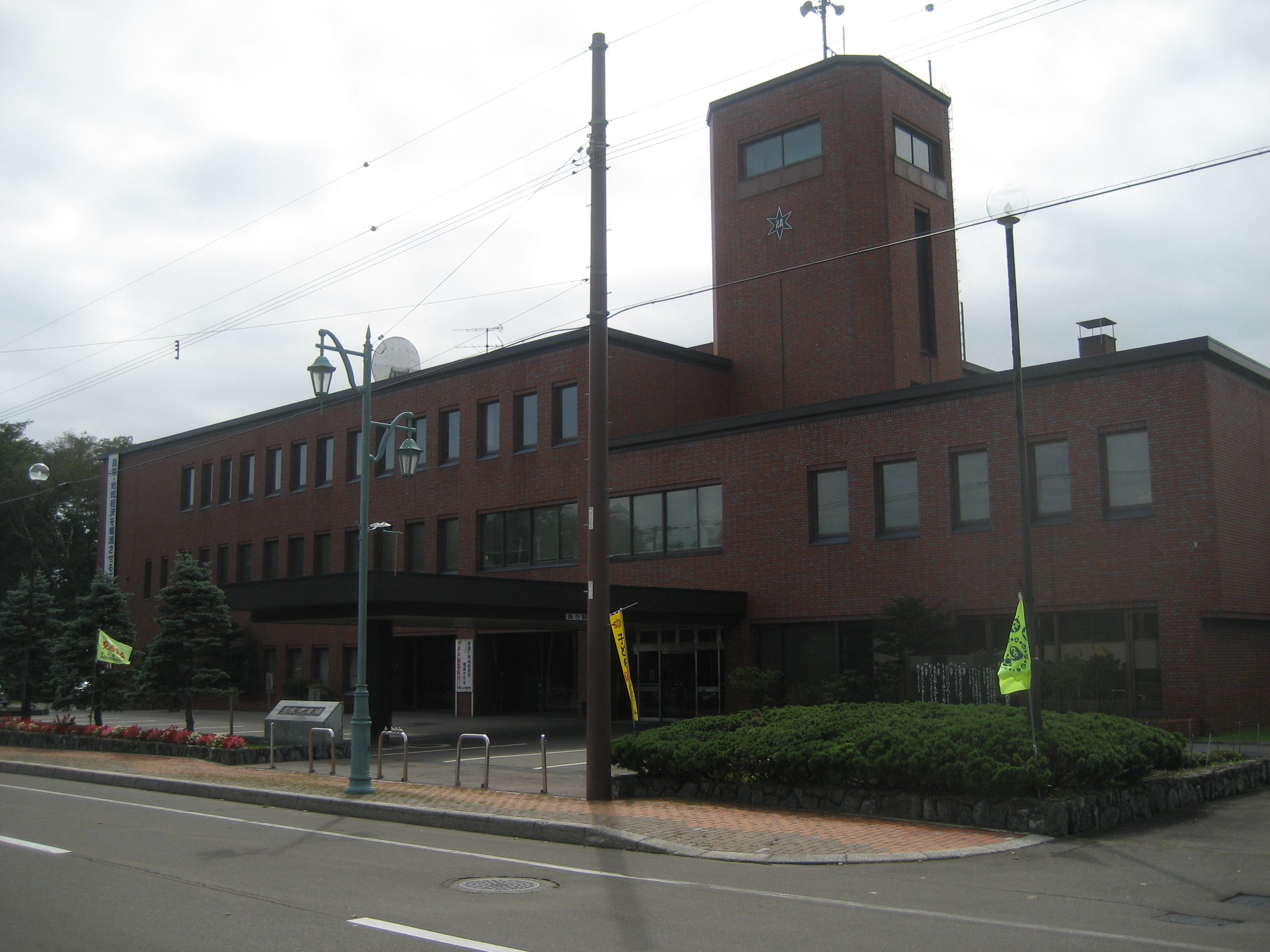
- Shimizu Town Hall

- Flag Seal

- Location of Shimizu in Hokkaido (Tokachi Subprefecture)
- Interactive map of Shimizu
- Coordinates: 43°00′41″N 142°53′05″E
- Country: Japan
- Region: Hokkaido
- Prefecture: Hokkaido (Tokachi Subprefecture)
- District: Kamikawa (Tokachi)

Area
  - Total: 402.25 km^{2} (155.31 sq mi)

Population (December 31, 2025)
  - Total: 8,631
  - Density: 21.46/km^{2} (55.57/sq mi)
- Time zone: UTC+09:00 (JST)
- City hall address: 2-2 Minami 4-jo, Shimizu-cho, Kamikawa-gun, Hokkaido 089-0192
- Website: www.town.shimizu.hokkaido.jp
- Symbols
- Bird: Japanese bush warbler
- Flower: Lily of the valley
- Tree: Japanese rowan

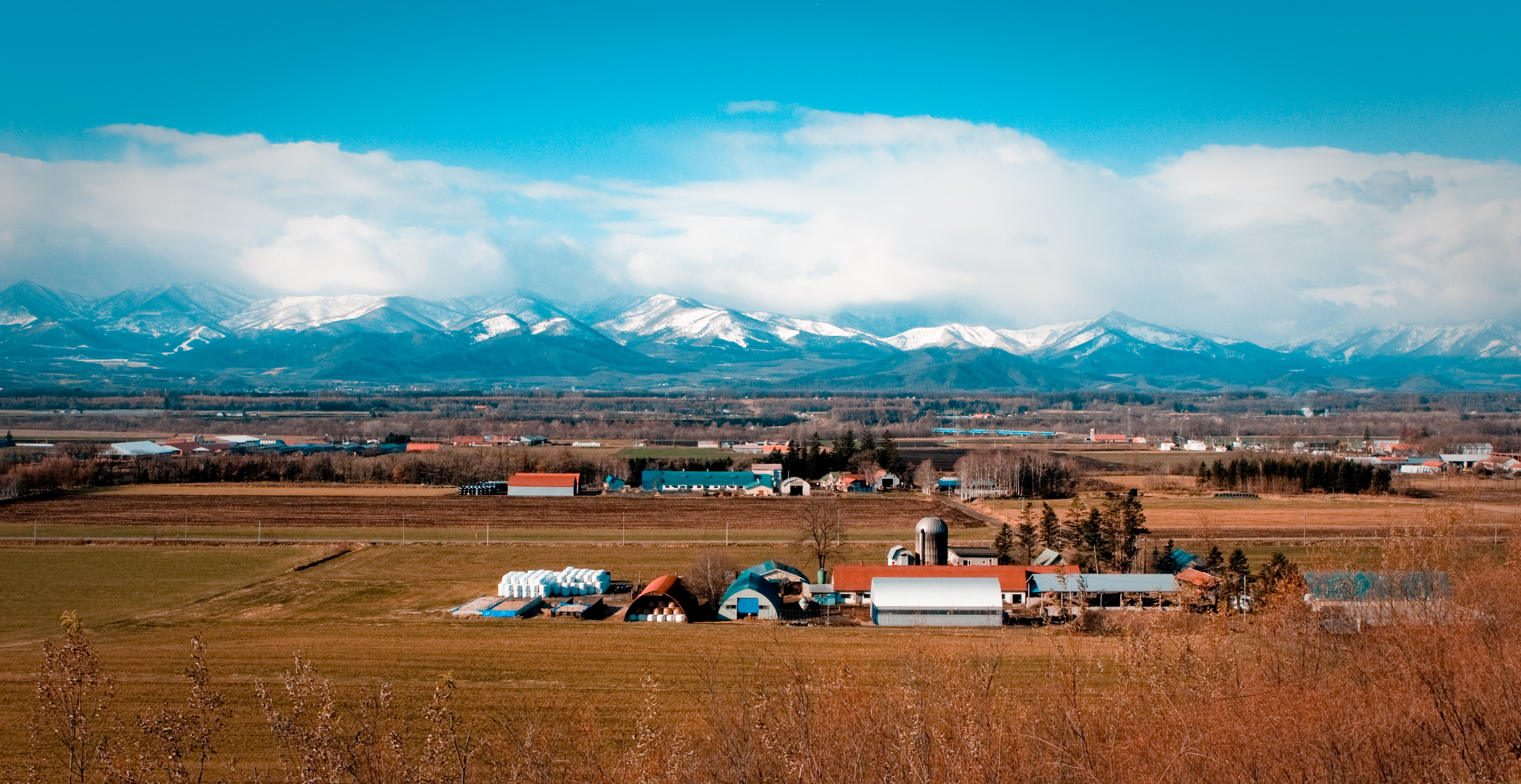
A view of Shimizu's farmlands and the Hidaka Mountain Range seen from Panorama park

Shimizu (清水町, Shimizu-chō) is a town located in Tokachi Subprefecture, Hokkaidō, Japan. As of 31 December 2025, the town had an estimated population of 8631 in 4314 households, and a population density of 21 people per km^{2}. The total area of the town is 402.25 km^{2} (155.31 sq mi). The name Shimizu is taken from the Japanese translation of the Ainu word "Pekerebetsu", which means bright clean river.

== Geography ==
Shimizu is located in southern Hokkaido in the western inland area of the Tokachi region, bordering the Hidaka Mountains. The geography of the town of Shimizu is mostly flat, with a few low-lying hills to the north..The mountainous area is in the western part of the town, and forms the northern edge of the Hidakasanmyaku-Erimo-Tokachi National Park. Mount Pankenūshi at 1754 meters, is the highest point in the town,

=== Neighboring municipalities ===
  - Shintoku
  - Shikaoi
  - Memuro
  - Minamifurano
  - Hidaka

=== Climate ===
According to the Köppen climate classification, Shimizu has a humid continental climate. It has large temperature differences, including large annual and daily temperature ranges. It receives a lot of snow, and is designated as a heavy snow area. In winter, temperatures below -20 °C are not uncommon, making it extremely cold.

=== Demographics ===
Per Japanese census data, the population of Shimizu has declined in recent decades.

Historical population
Year	Pop.	±%
1970	16,162	—
1980	13,352	−17.4%
1990	12,033	−9.9%
2000	10,988	−8.7%
2010	9,967	−9.3%
2020	9,094	−8.8%

== History ==
The area of Shimizu was settled in 1898 by a colonization project by Shibusawa Eiichi, who sponsored 26 households, with 99 people, from former Echizen Province. Originally part of Kuttari Village (now Shintoku Town) it was separated and became Hitomai Village in 1915. Hitomai became a first class village in 1923 and was renamed Shimizu in 1927. It was raised to town status in 1936.

In 1907 a railway connecting Kushiro and Asahikawa was built. At the time, two lines ran through the town: the Tokachi line, and the Tooru Hiraku line. Another improvement that helped put the town on the map was the opening of Nissho Toge, a mountain pass running through the Hidaka Mountains, which opened in 1965. This National Highway, route 274, runs to Sapporo. In 1980, the town's cultural center opened, and is famous for the playing of Beethoven’s 9th Symphony. Every year, students from Shimizu High School practice singing the symphony, for an end of the year concert. The town's first swimming pool opened in 1983, and in 1990, both the town's library and local history museum were established.

== Government ==
Shimizu has a mayor-council form of government with a directly elected mayor and a unicameral town council of 13 members. Shimizu, as part of Tokachi Subprefecture, contributes four members to the Hokkaidō Prefectural Assembly. In terms of national politics, the town is part of the Hokkaidō 11th district of the lower house of the Diet of Japan.

== Economy ==
The local economy is overwhelmingly agricultural. Shimizu has roughly 440 farmers, and 14,500 ha of farmland. Dairy farming, cattle farming, and sugar beet cultivation are some of the main types of agriculture that take place in Shimizu and the surrounding area.

== Education ==
Shimizu has two public elementary schools and two public middle schools operated by the town, and one public high school operated by the Hokkaido Board of Education.

== Transportation ==
=== Railways ===
JR Hokkaido - Nemuro Main Line

■ Tokachi-Shimizu - Mikage

=== Highways ===
- Dōtō Expressway
- National Route 38
- National Route 274

== Sister city relations ==
- (United States) Chelsea, Michigan, USA, since 1993. Groups of 7th and 8th graders from Chelsea visit Japan and stay with a host family for just under two weeks.
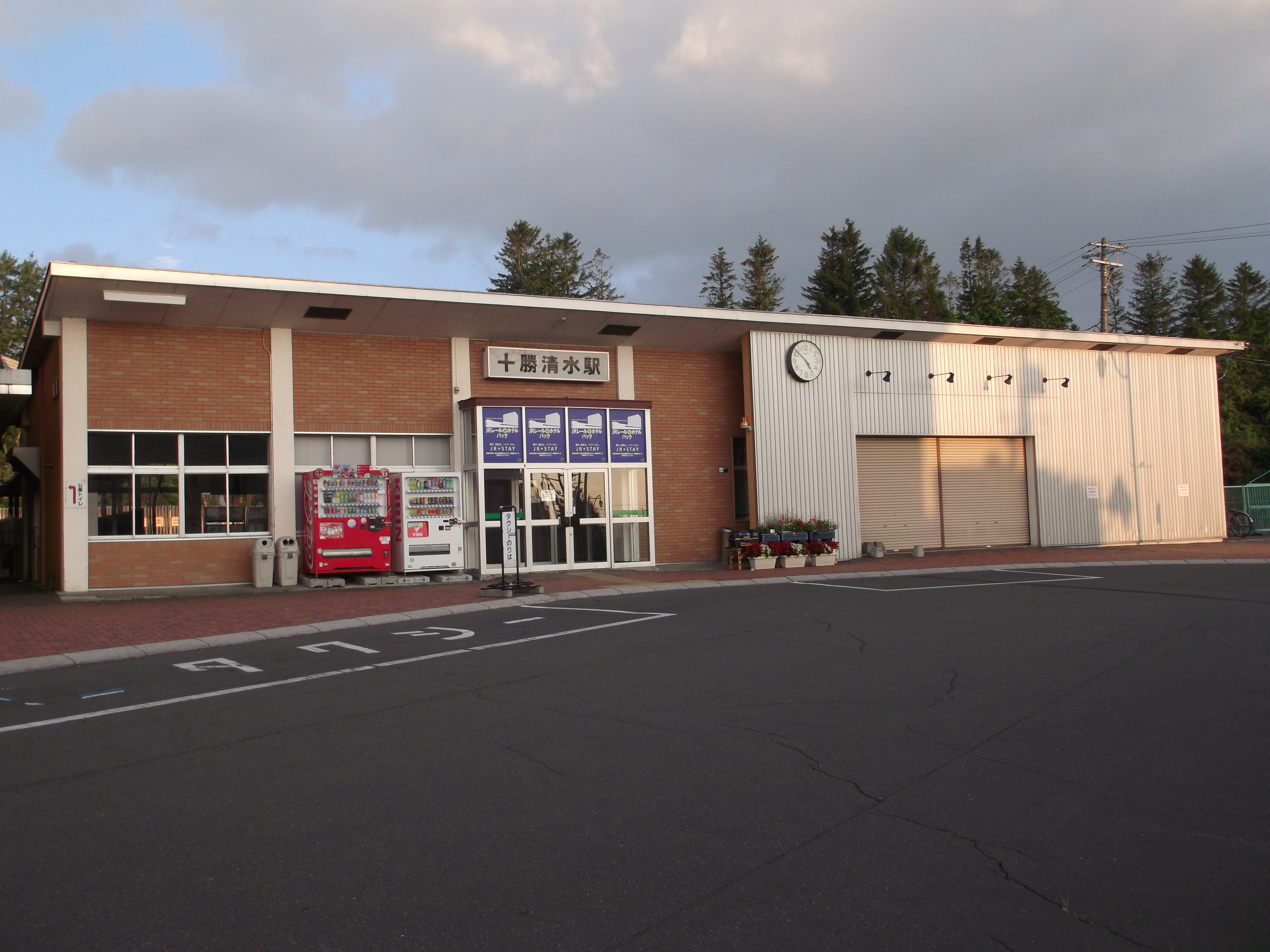
Tokachi-Shimizu railway station

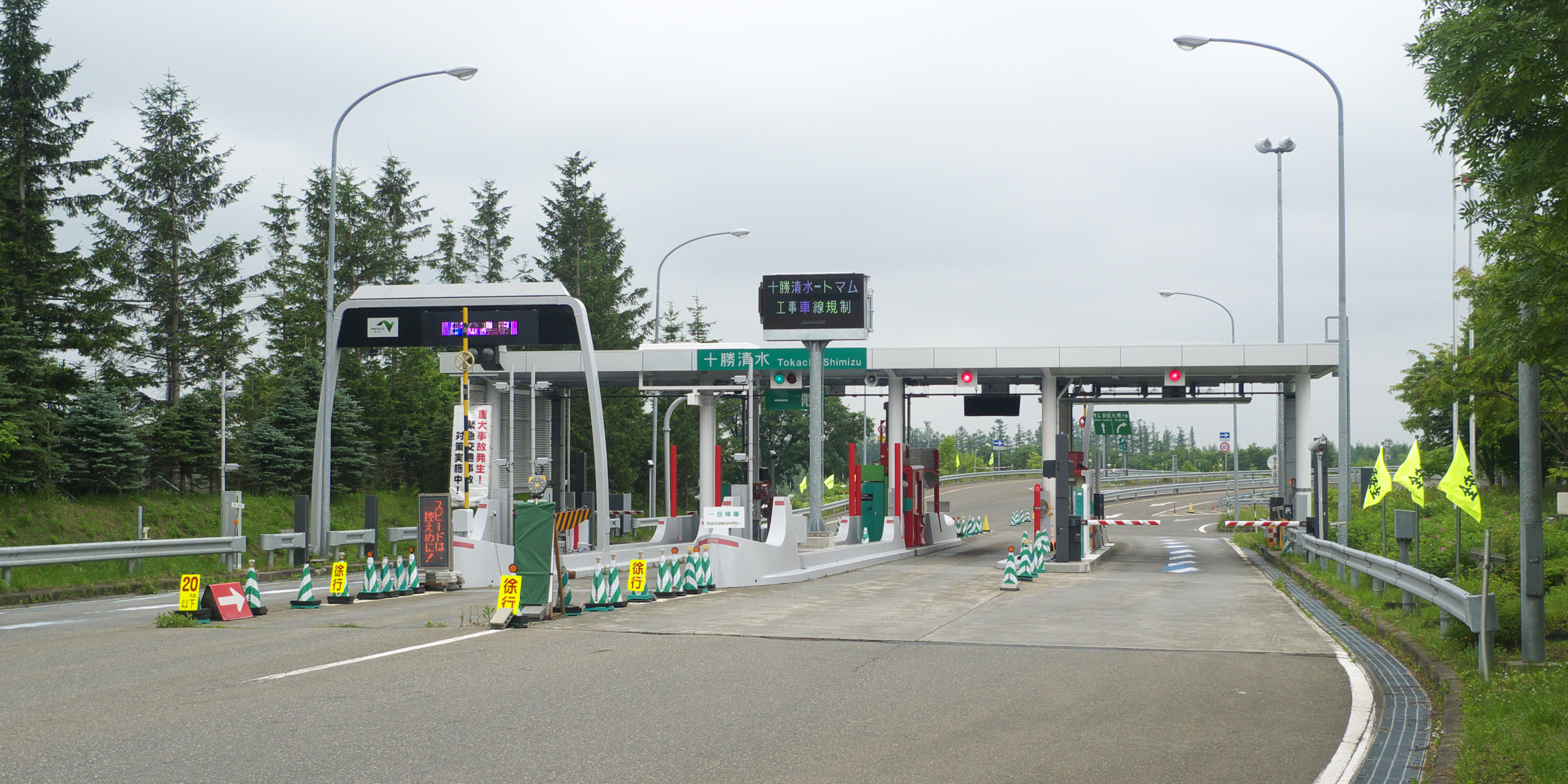
Doto Expressway Tokachi-Shimizu Interchange

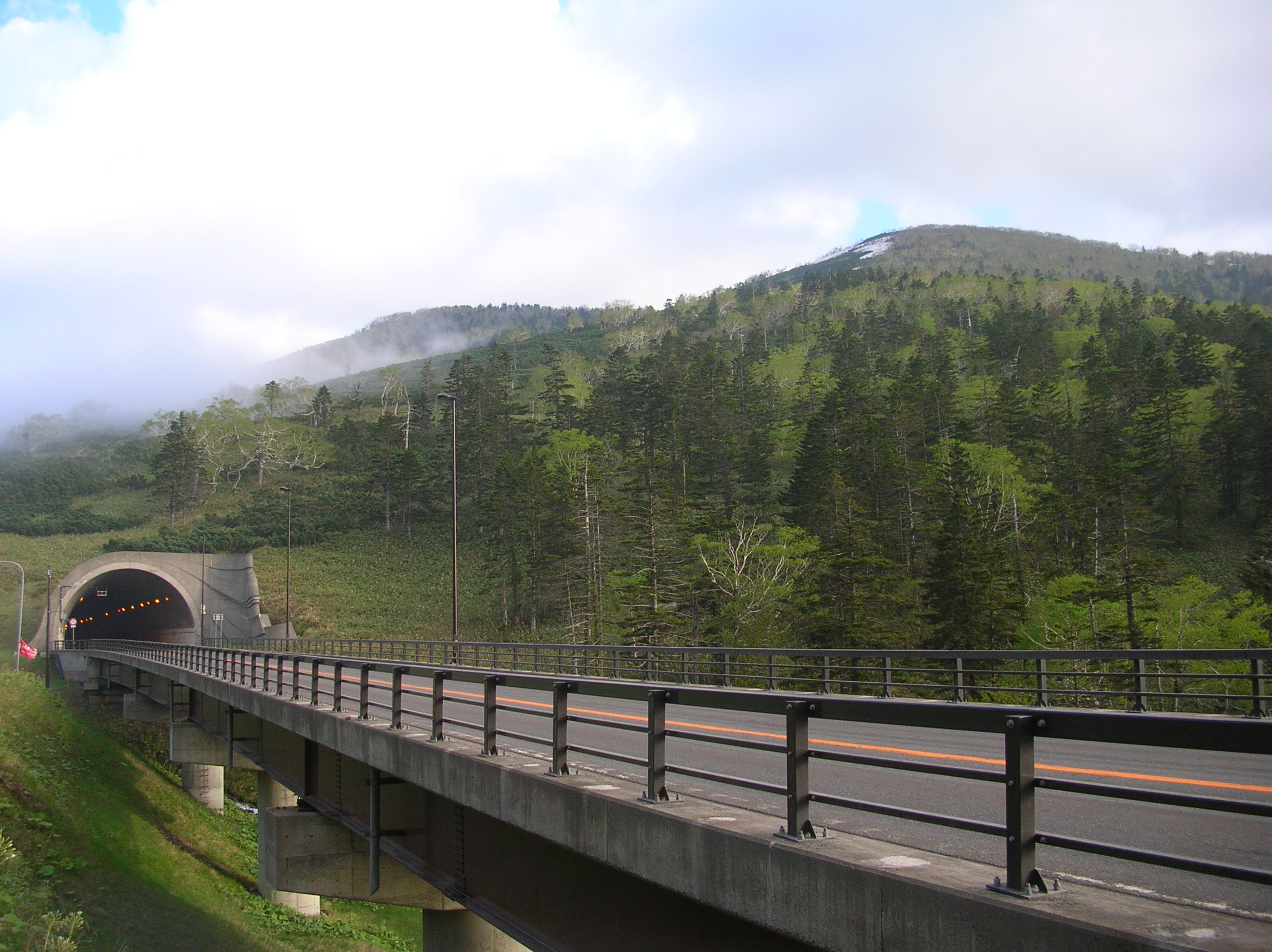
Nissho Pass

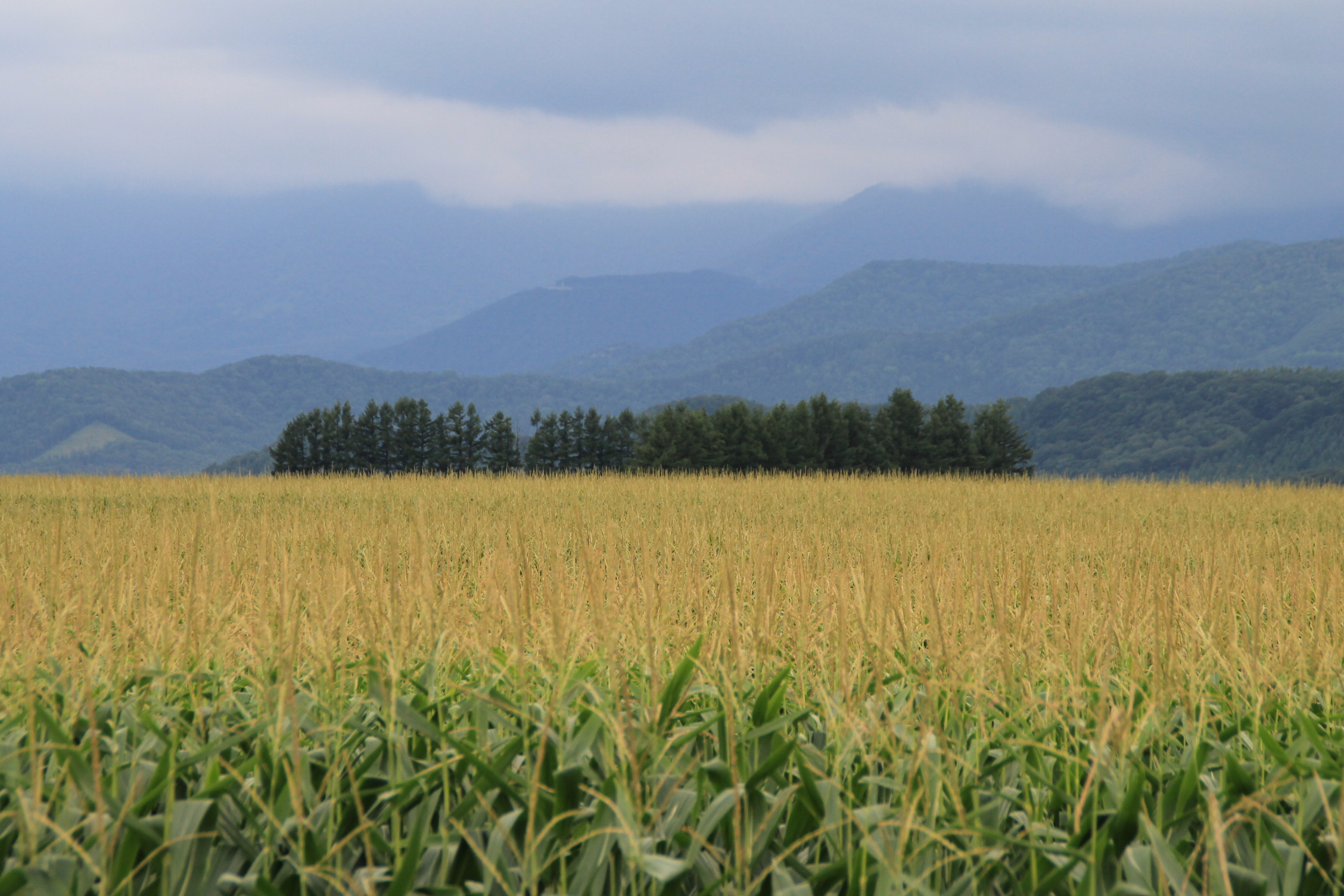
Corn fields in Shimizu

== Local attractions ==
The town is in a prime location for skiers & snowboard enthusiasts alike in the winter, and becomes a haven for cyclists and motorcyclists in the warmer months.

- Skiing/Snowboarding

Several ski hills are within a half-hour drive, including Tomamu Ski Hill and Memuro's Arashiyama Ski Hill.

== Mascots ==
Ut-chan and Hataraku-kun, the town's mascots

Shimizu's mascots are Ut-chan (うっちゃん) and Hataraku-kun (はたらく君).

- Ut-chan is a tomboyish Japanese bush warbler who loves to play ice hockey and do skiing. She also attends matsuri festivals. She was unveiled in 1990.
- Hataraku-kun is a water alien who is Ut-chan's assistant. His name comes from the Ainu word "pekerebetsu" meaning a bright and pure river. He was unveiled in 2010.

== Notable people from Shimizu ==
- Miho Oki, former racing cyclist
- Shota Sakaki, football player

== See also ==
- Hidaka Mountains
- Mount Sahoro
