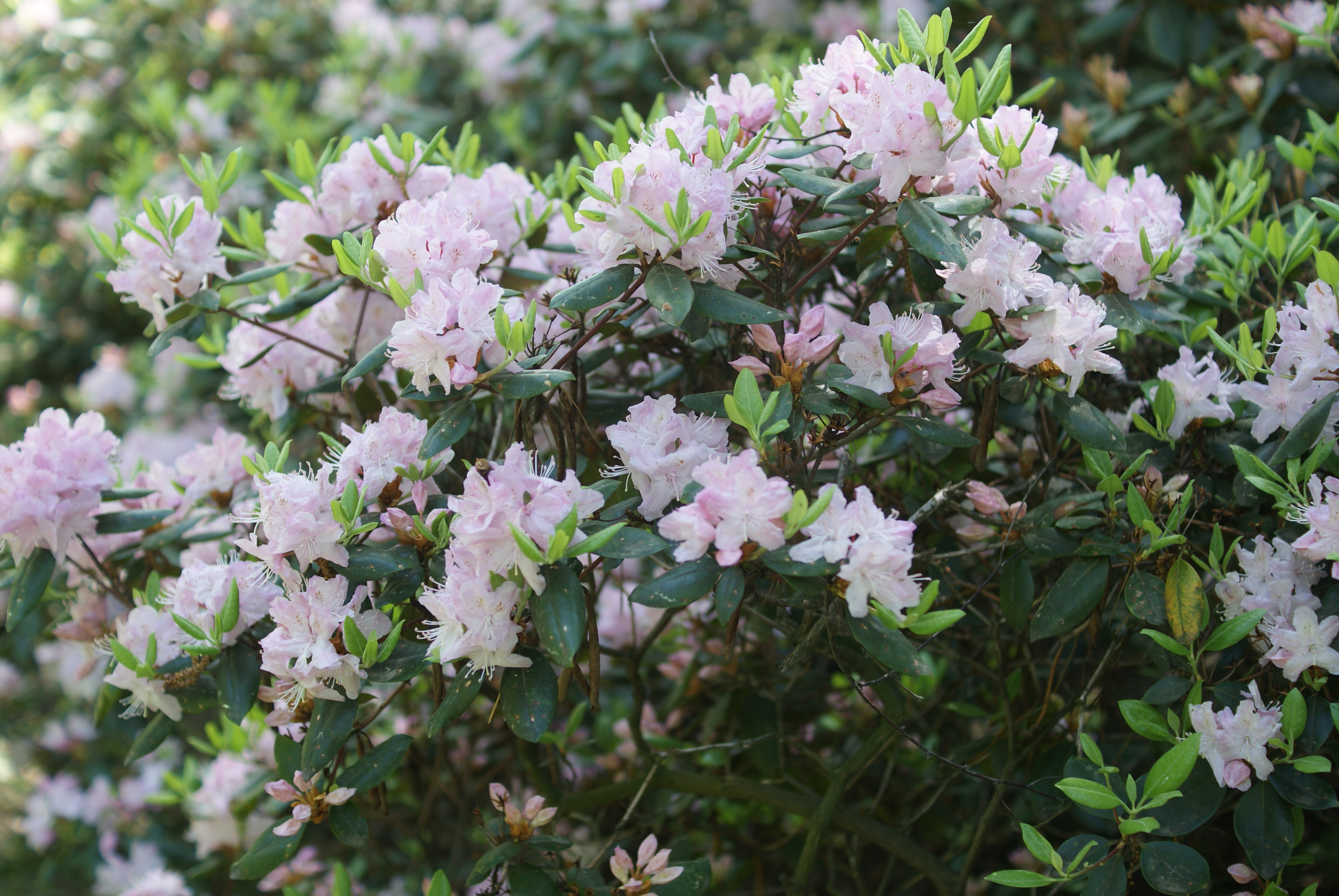
- A specimen in bloom at the Botanical Garden of Minsk

Scientific classification
- Kingdom: Plantae
- Clade: Tracheophytes
- Clade: Angiosperms
- Clade: Eudicots
- Clade: Asterids
- Order: Ericales
- Family: Ericaceae
- Genus: Rhododendron
- Species: R. minus Michx.
- Variety: R. m. var. minus

Trinomial name
- Rhododendron minus var. minus

Synonyms
- Rhododendron carolinianum Rehder; Rhododendron punctatum Andrews; Rhododendron cuthbertii Small

= Rhododendron minus var. minus =

Carolina rhododendron

Variety of plant

Rhododendron minus var. minus, the Carolina azalea or Carolina rhododendron, is a rhododendron species native to the mountains of North Carolina, South Carolina, Tennessee, and Northeast Georgia. It is commonly known as Rhododendron carolinianum in the horticultural trade.

== Cultivation ==
Cultivars include 'Album', 'Carolina Gold', 'Luteum' and 'White Perfection'. R. caroliniaum was crossed with Rhododendron dauricum to create the PJM hybrids.

== Bibliography ==
- The Plant List: Rhododendron carolinianum
- NRCS. "Rhododendron minus". PLANTS Database. United States Department of Agriculture (USDA).
- North Carolina State University: Rhododendron carolinianum
- Alfred Rehder. RHODODENDRON CAROLINIANUM, A NEW RHODODENDRON FROM NORTH CAROLINA. Rhodora, Vol. 14, No. 162 (June, 1912), pp. 97–102
