= Sahoro Dam =

Dam in Hokkaido Prefecture, Japan

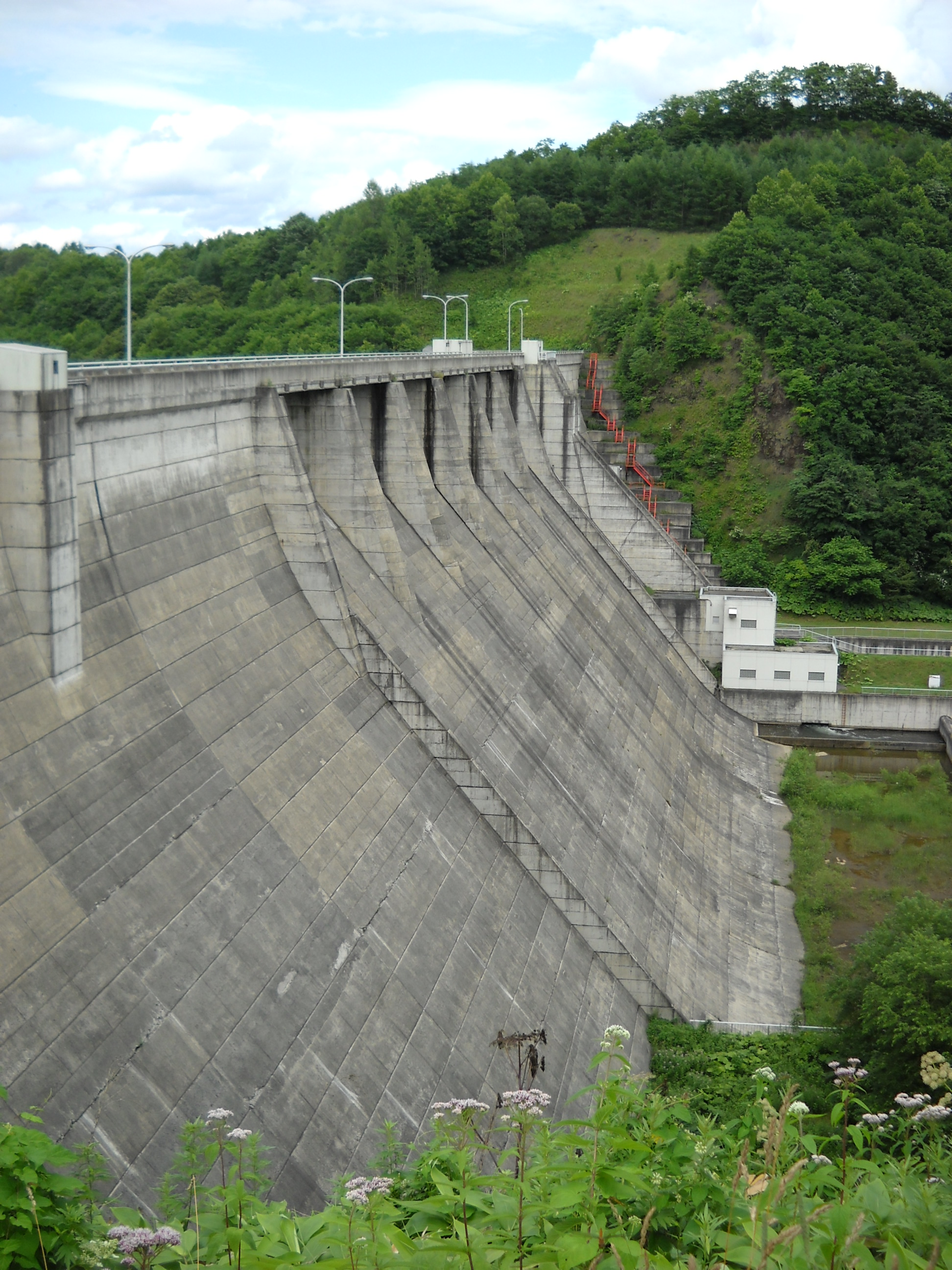

- Location within Japan
- Location: Hokkaido Prefecture, Japan
- Coordinates: 43°10′13″N 142°50′18″E
- Construction began: 1970
- Opening date: 1984

Dam and spillways
- Height: 46.6 m (153 ft)
- Length: 255 m (837 ft)

Reservoir
- Total capacity: 10,400,000 m^{3} (370,000,000 cu ft)
- Catchment area: 78 km^{2} (30 sq mi)
- Surface area: 64 hectares (160 acres)

Sahoro Dam (Japanese: 佐幌ダム（元）) is a gravity dam located in Hokkaido Prefecture in Japan. The dam is used for flood control. The catchment area of the dam is 78 km^{2}. The dam impounds about 64 ha of land when full and can store 10400 thousand cubic meters of water. The construction of the dam was started on 1970 and completed in 1984.
