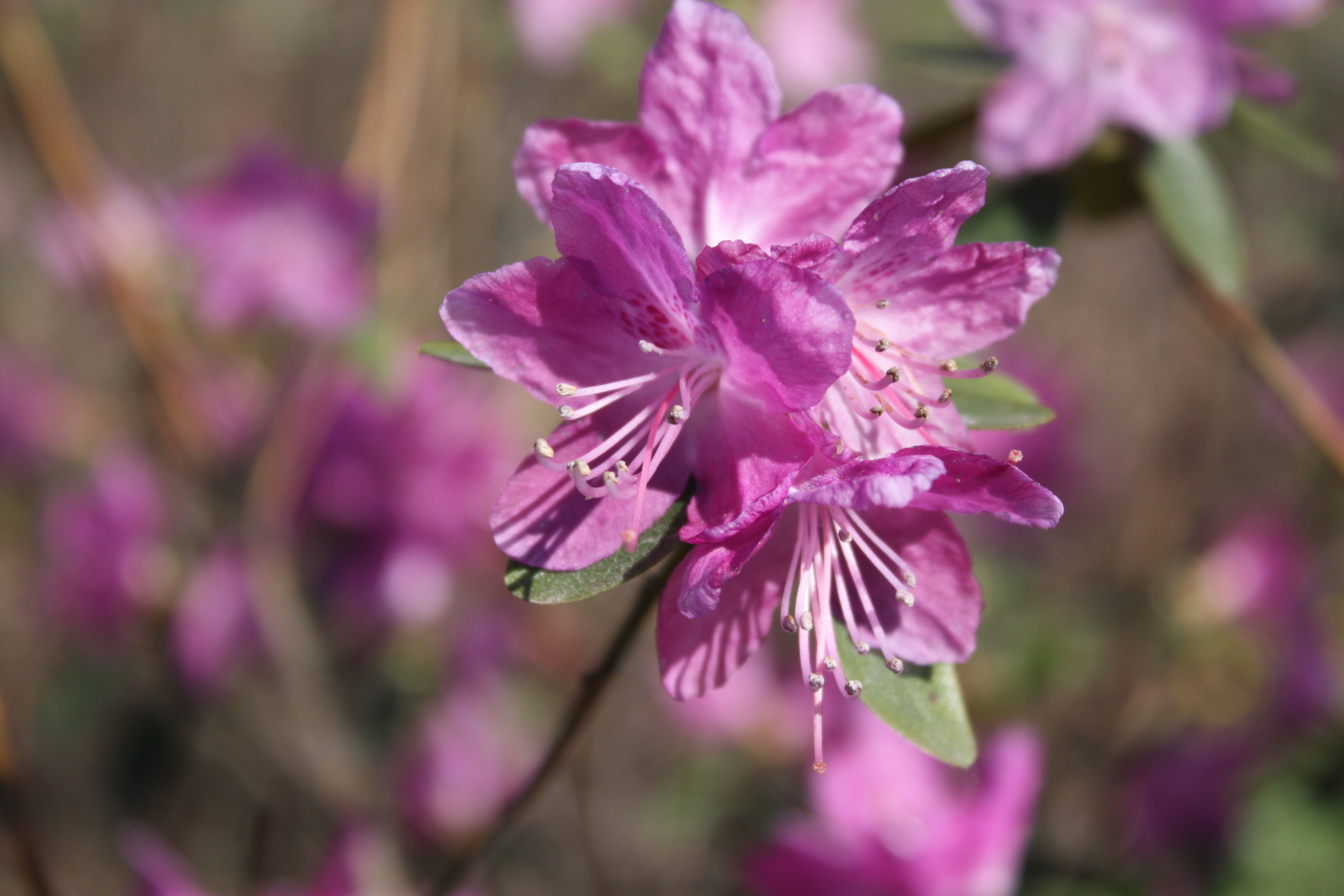

Scientific classification
- Kingdom: Plantae
- Clade: Embryophytes
- Clade: Tracheophytes
- Clade: Spermatophytes
- Clade: Angiosperms
- Clade: Eudicots
- Clade: Asterids
- Order: Ericales
- Family: Ericaceae
- Genus: Rhododendron
- Species: R. dauricum

Binomial name
- Rhododendron dauricum L.

Synonyms
- List: Azalea daurica (L.) Kuntze; Azalea dahurica K.Koch; Rhododendron atrovirens (Ker Gawl.) Tagg; Rhododendron dauricum f. albiflorum Turcz.) Y.C.Zhu; Rhododendron dauricum var. atrovirens Ker Gawl.; Rhododendron dauricum subsp. ledebourii (Pojark.) Alexandrova & P.A.Schmidt; Rhododendron dauricum var. pallidum Regel; Rhododendron dauricum var. roseum DC.; Rhododendron dauricum var. sempervirens Sims; Rhododendron ledebourii Pojark.

= Rhododendron dauricum =

Species of flowering plant

Rhododendron dauricum is a species of flowering plant in the heath family Ericaceae native to forests and forest margins in Eastern Siberia, Mongolia, North China and Hokkaido, Japan. The Latin specific epithet dauricum means "from Siberia" – Transbaikal is also known as Dauria.

== Description ==
Growing to 1.5 m (5 ft) tall and broad, it is a compact semi-evergreen shrub with purple flowers which open in late winter or early spring, before the dark green leaves appear.

== Phytochemistry ==
R. dauricum contains monoterpenoids daurichromenic acid (DCA) and confluentin (decarboxylated DCA) as well as rhododaurichromenic acids A and B which are structurally related to cannabichromene.

== Cultivation ==
R. dauricum is the basis of the PJM hybrid (Rhododendron dauricum × Rhododendron carolinianum).

The cultivar 'Mid-winter', with bright pink flowers, has gained the Royal Horticultural Society's Award of Garden Merit. It is hardy down to −20 °C (−4 °F), but like all rhododendrons requires a sheltered position in dappled shade and acid soil enriched with leaf mould.

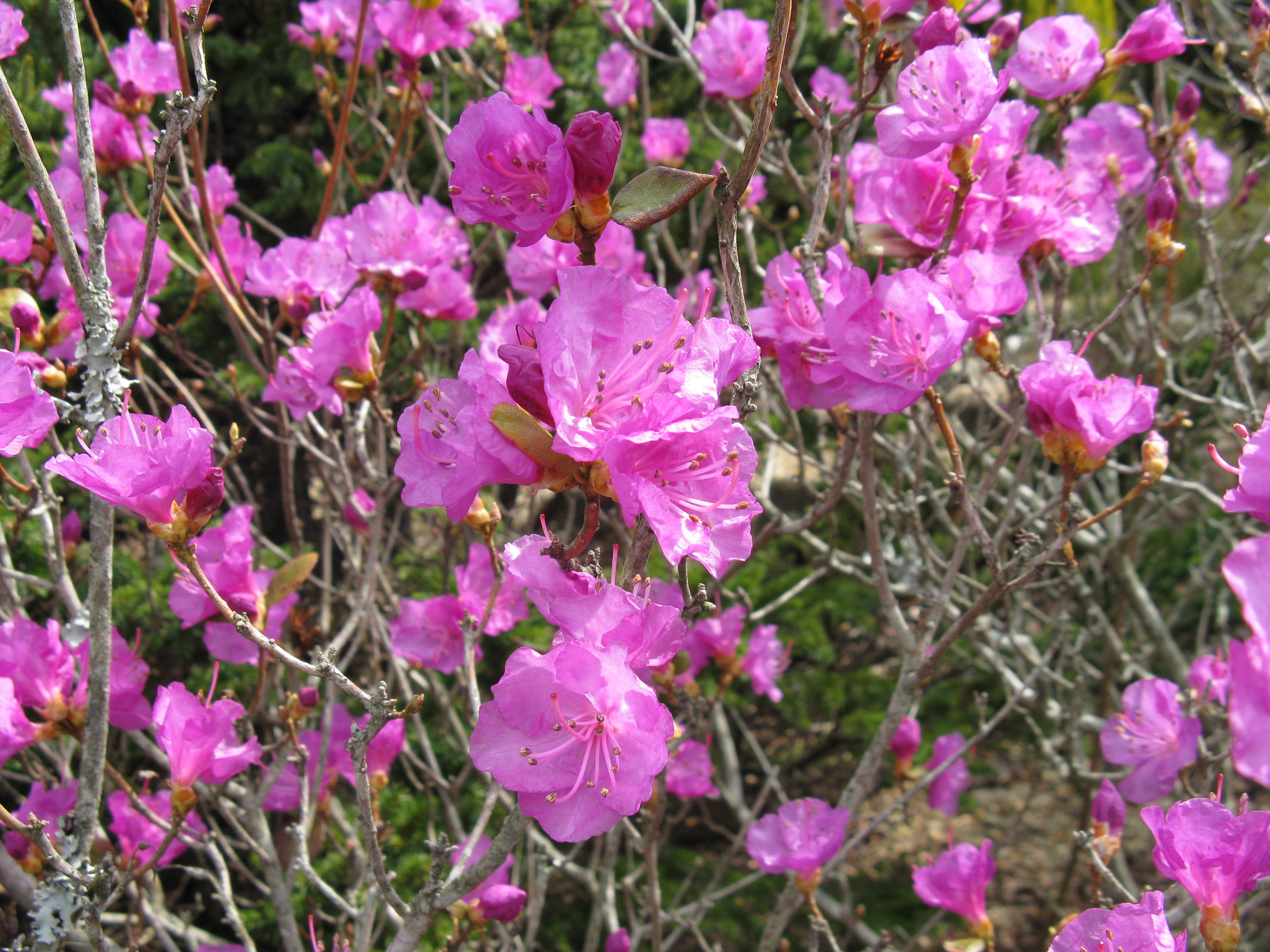

== Bibliography ==
- The Plant List
- Hirsutum.com
