= Tokachi Dam =

Dam in Hokkaidō Prefecture, Japan

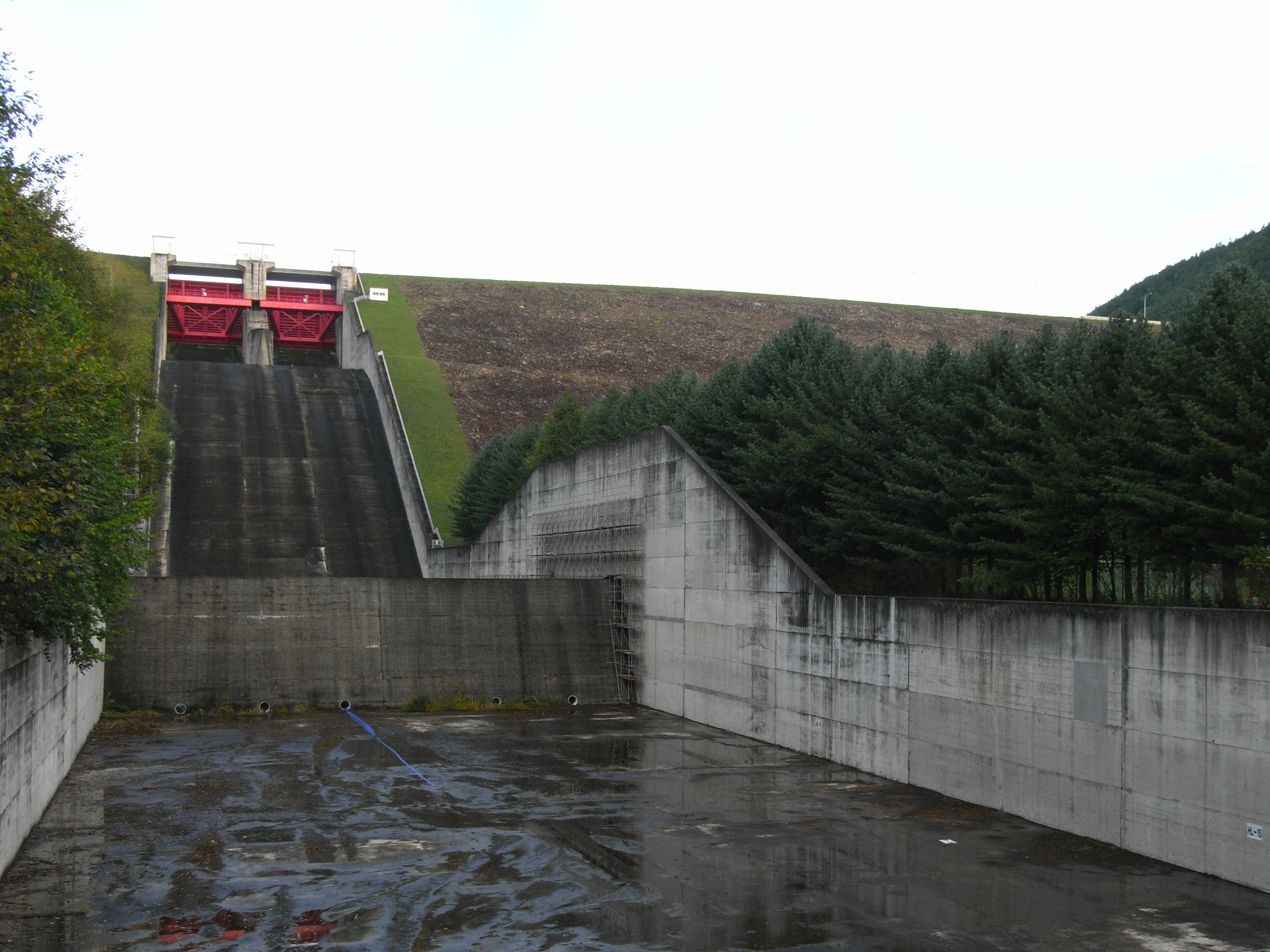
- Interactive map of Tokachi Dam
- Location: Hokkaidō, Japan
- Coordinates: 43°14′25″N 142°56′20″E
- Construction began: 1970
- Opening date: 1984

Dam and spillways
- Impounds: Tokachi River
- Height: 84.3 m
- Length: 443 m

Reservoir
- Total capacity: 112,000,000 m^{3}
- Catchment area: 592.0 km^{2}
- Surface area: 420 hectares

Tokachi Dam is a dam in Hokkaidō, Japan. The dam provides flood control and also is used to create hydropower. It was built by the Taisei Corporation and was completed in March 1985.
