= Mikage Station (Hokkaido) =

Railway station in Shimizu, Hokkaido, Japan

K26 Mikage Station 御影駅
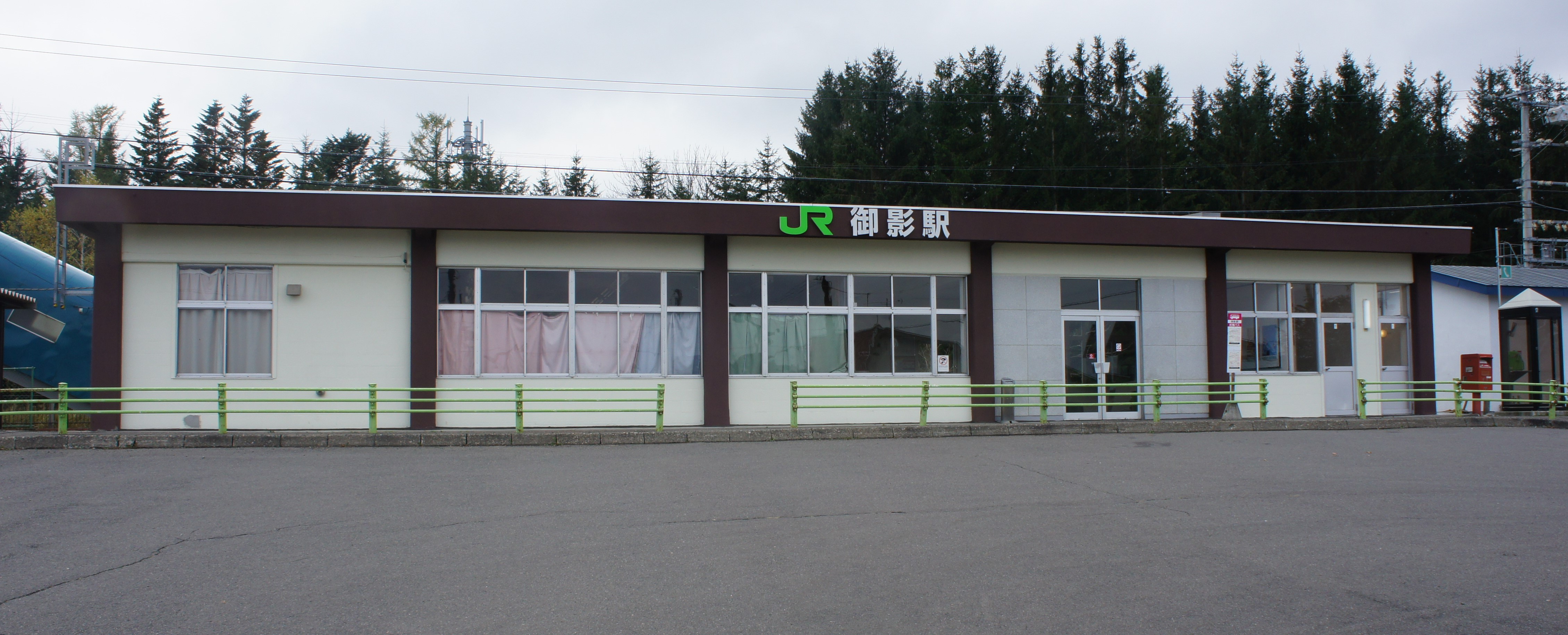
- Station building, October 2017

General information
- Location: Minami 2 Sen Mikage, Shimizu, Kamikawa District, Hokkaido 089-0357; Japan
- Coordinates: 42°56′32.71″N 142°56′8.66″E
- System: regional rail
- Operator: JR Hokkaido
- Line: Nemuro Main Line
- Distance: 19.6 km from Shintoku
- Platforms: 2 side platforms
- Tracks: 2

Construction
- Structure type: At-grade
- Accessible: No

Other information
- Status: Unstaffed
- Station code: K26
- Website: Official website

History
- Opened: 8 September 1907; 119 years ago

Passengers
- FY2014: 72 daily

Services
Preceding station	JR Hokkaido	Following station
Tokachi-Shimizu towards Takikawa	Nemuro Main Line Local	Memuro towards Nemuro
Location
- Location within Hokkaido Location within Japan

Mikage Station (御影駅, Mikage-eki) is a railway station located in the town of Toyokoro, Nakagawa District, Hokkaidō, It is operated by JR Hokkaido.

== Lines ==
The station is served by the Nemuro Main Line, and lies 19.6 km from the starting point of the line at Shintoku.

== Layout ==
Mikage Station has two opposing side platforms and two tracks. Platform 1, the main track adjacent to the station building, is generally used for both inbound and outbound trains, with platform 2 only used when trains need to switch. The two platforms are connected by a footbridge. The station building is unattended.

=== Platforms ===
1	■ Nemuro Main Line	for Shintoku
2	■ Nemuro Main Line	for Obihiro and Shintoku

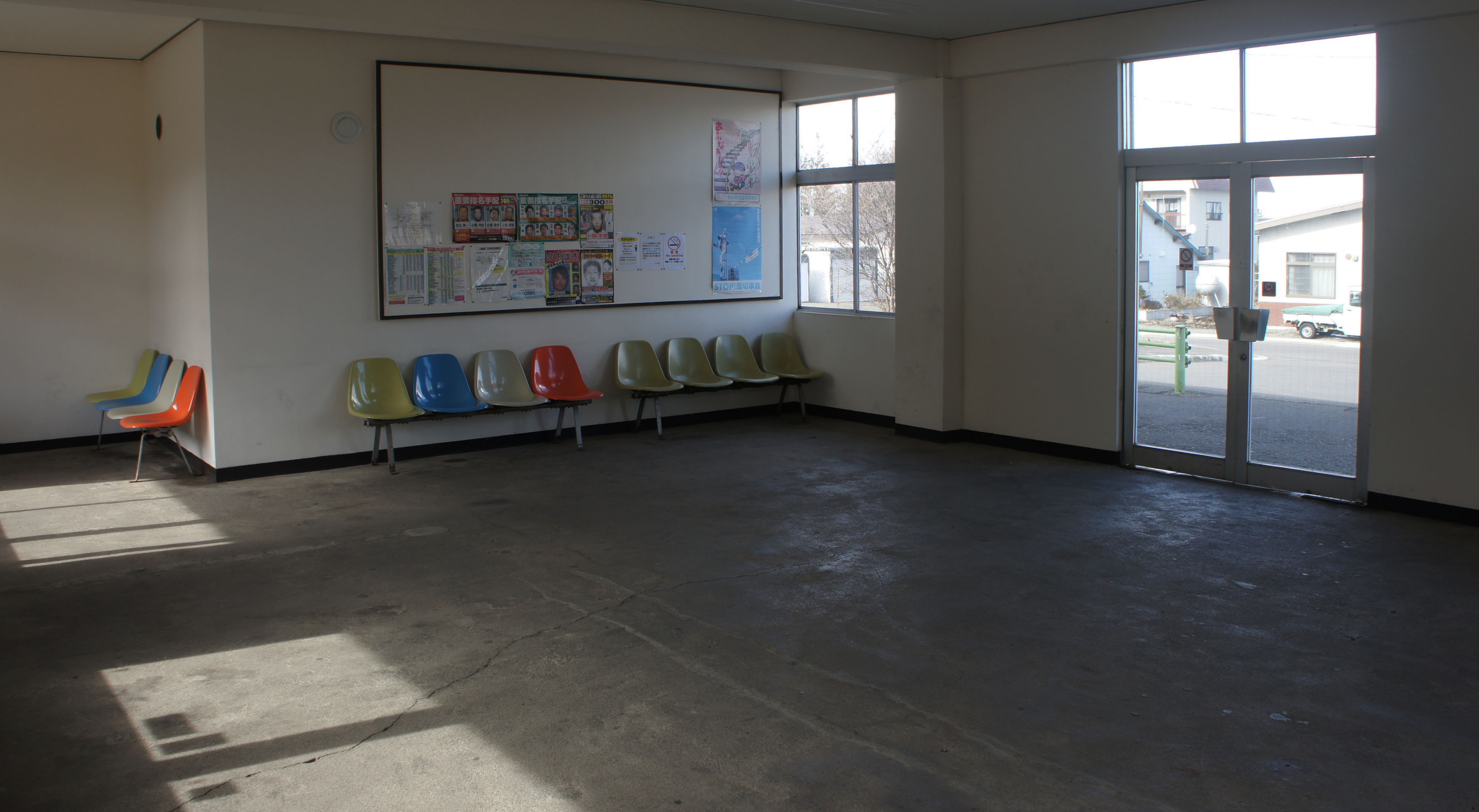
Waiting room

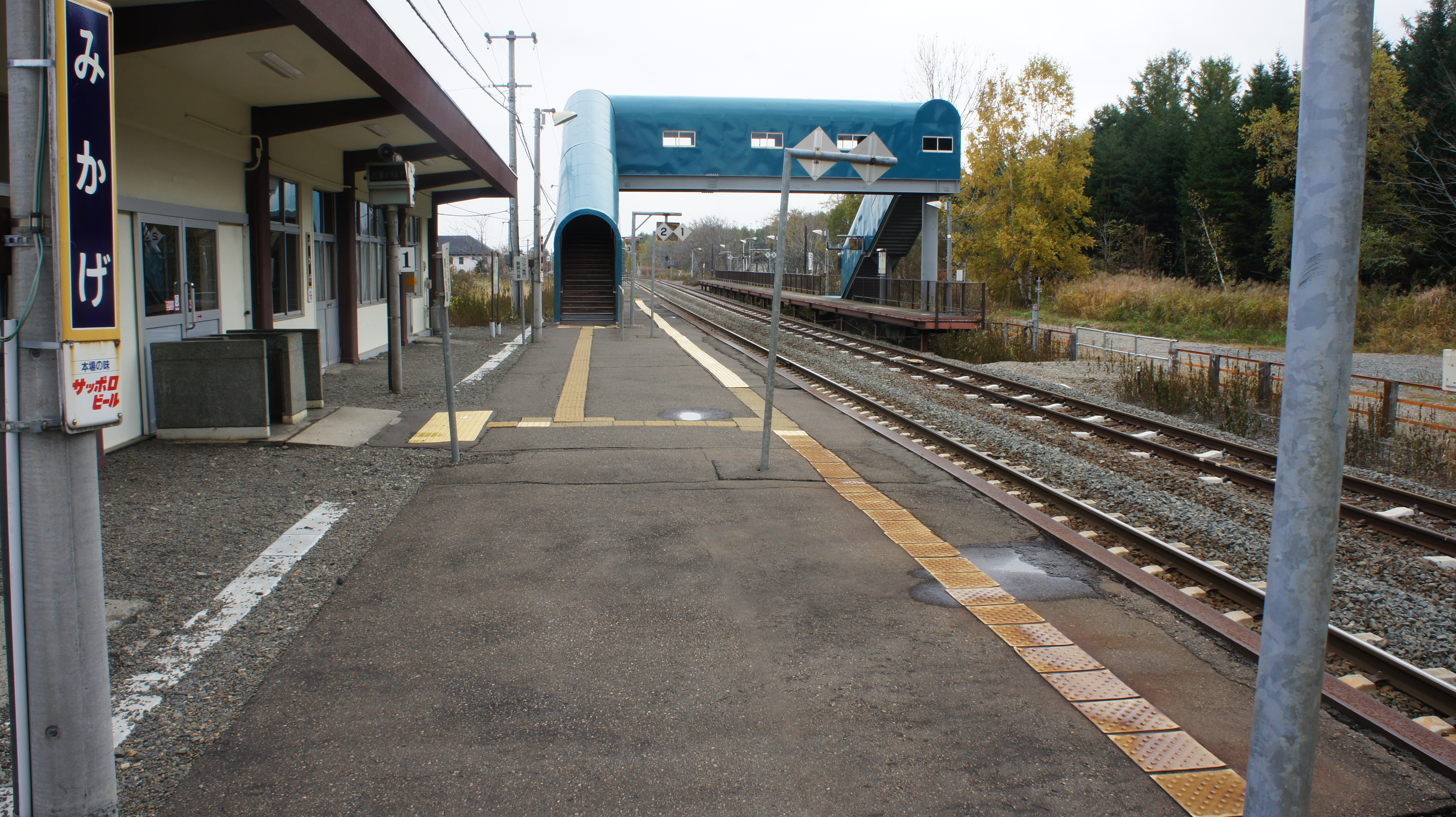
Platforms

== History ==
The station was opened as Sanenkoro Station (佐念頃駅) on 8 September 1907. The name was a transliteration from the Ainu language; "san enkoro" translates as "protruding nose" in English. The name was changed to Mikage on 15 October 1922. It was named after the granite which was mined in the area, which is sometimes called mikageishi (御影石) in Japanese. The village of Mikage had been established the previous year.With the privatization of the Japan National Railway (JNR) on 1 April 1987, the station came under the aegis of the Hokkaido Railway Company (JR Hokkaido)..

== Passenger statistics ==
In fiscal 2014, the station was used by 72 passengers daily.。

== Surrounding area ==
- Japan National Route 38
- Shimizu Town Hall Mikage Branch

== See also ==
- List of railway stations in Japan
