= Nishi-Obihiro Station =

Railway station in Obihiro, Hokkaido, Japan

K29 Nishi-Obihiro Station 西帯広駅
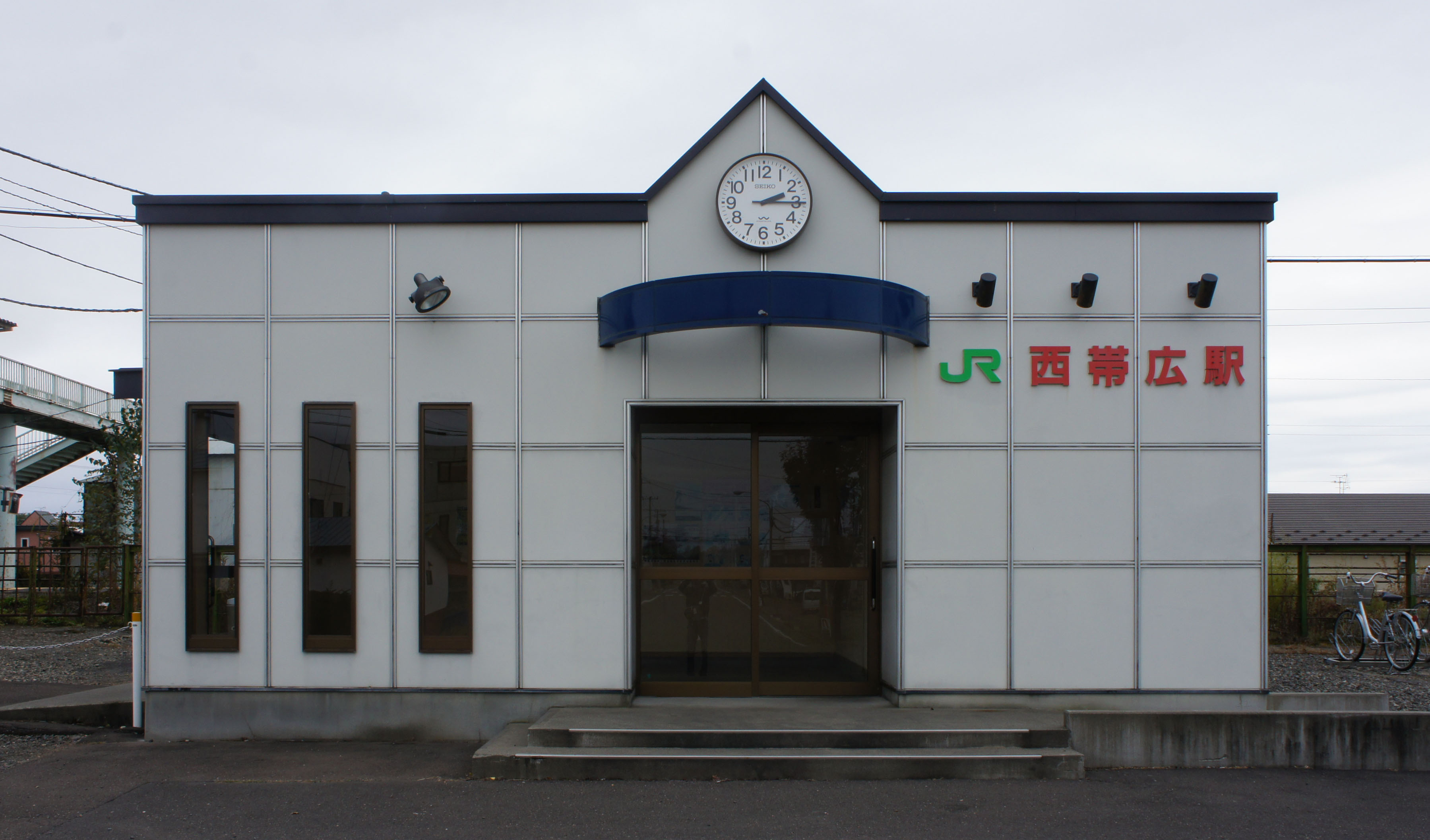
- Station building in October 2017

General information
- Location: 1 Chome Nishi 23 Jominami, Obihiro, Hokkaido 080-2473; Japan
- Coordinates: 42°55′26.82″N 143°7′31.53″E
- System: regional rail
- Operator: JR Hokkaido
- Line: Nemuro Main Line
- Distance: 37.1km from Shintoku
- Platforms: 1 side + 1 island platform

Construction
- Structure type: At-grade
- Accessible: No

Other information
- Status: Unstaffed
- Station code: K29
- Website: Official website

History
- Opened: 8 September 1907; 119 years ago
- Former names: Fushiko Station (to 1954)

Passengers
- FY2014: 588 daily

Services
Preceding station	JR Hokkaido	Following station
Taisei towards Takikawa	Nemuro Main Line Local	Hakurindai towards Nemuro
Location
- Location within Hokkaido Location within Japan

Nishi-Obihiro Station (西帯広駅, Nishi-Obihiro-eki) is a railway station located in the city of Obihiro, Tokachi Subprefecture, Hokkaidō, It is operated by JR Hokkaido.

== Lines ==
The station is served by the Nemuro Main Line, and lies 37.1 km from the starting point of the line at Shintoku.

== Layout ==
Nishi-Obihiro Station has one side platform and one island platform. The main line is platform 2, and only when passing or waiting for other trains to pass do platform 1 (and sometimes 3) be used for outbound trains, and platform 3 for inbound trains. There are also unused platforms remaining on the now defunct Obihiro City Industrial Development Corporation's private line portion of the statio. Passengers must use an overpass from the ground-level waiting room to the platform. This overpass also serves as a free passageway connecting the north and south sides of the station. The station building is unattended.

=== Platforms ===
1, 3	■ Nemuro Main Line	for Obihiro
2, 3	■ Nemuro Main Line	for Memuro and Shintoku

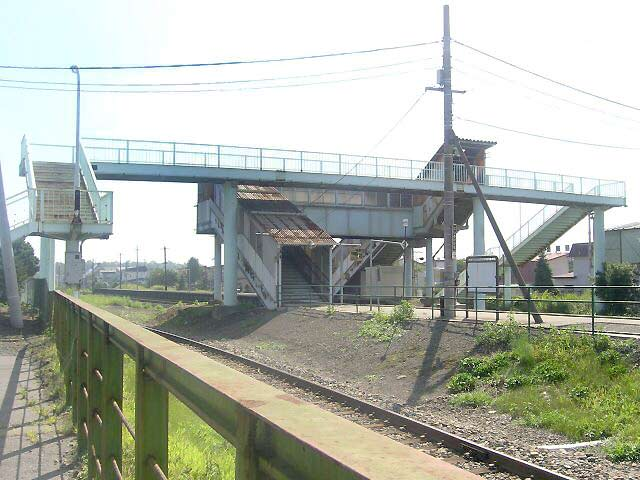
External view of the station

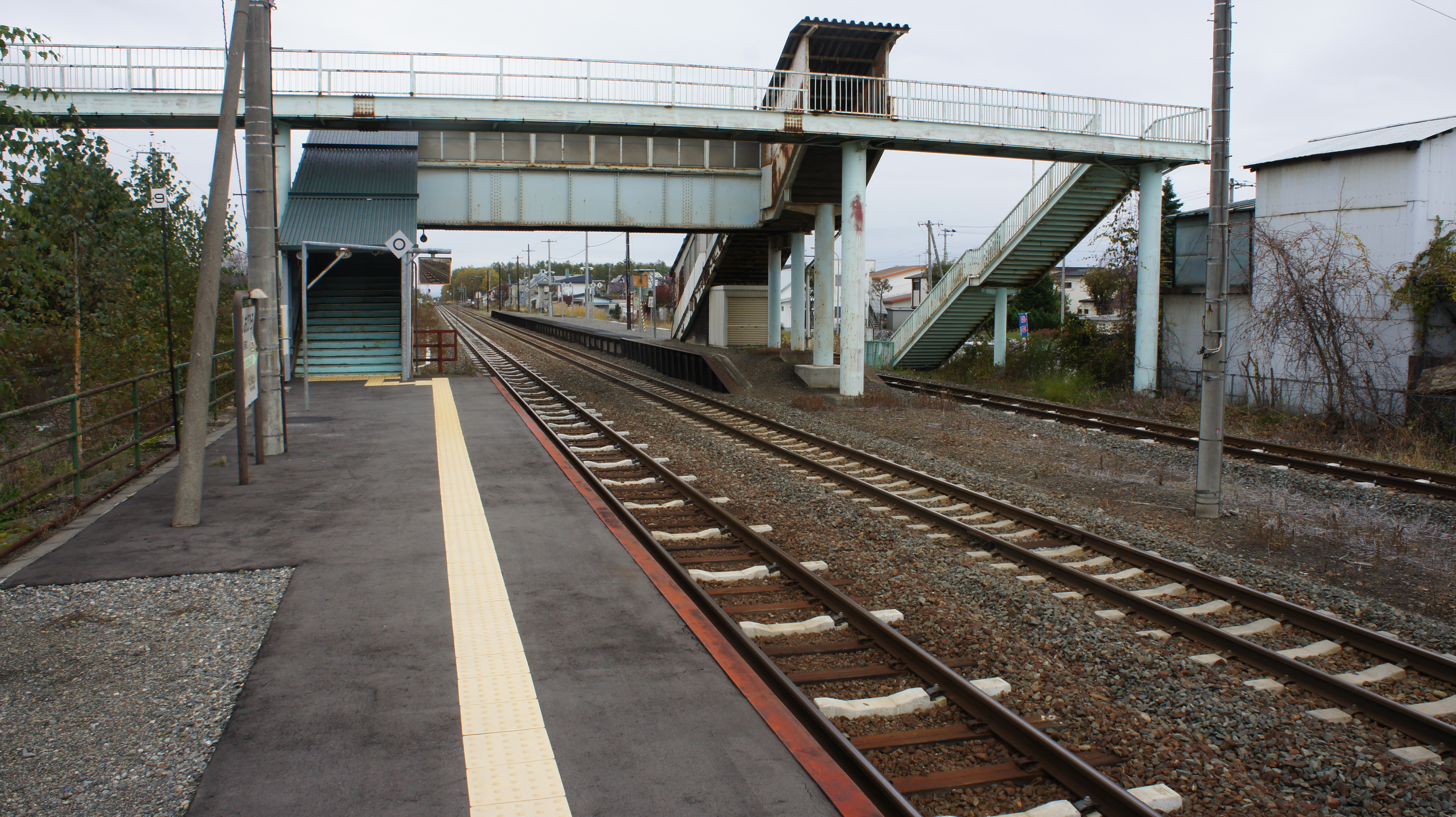
Platform

== History ==
Nishi-Obihiro Station opened on 8 September 1907 as Fushiko Station (止若駅). It was renamed to its current name, Nishi-Obihiro Station, in November 1954. With the privatization of the Japan National Railway (JNR) on 1 April 1987, the station came under the aegis of the Hokkaido Railway Company (JR Hokkaido).

== Passenger statistics ==
In fiscal 2014, the station was used by 588 passengers daily.。

== Surrounding area ==
The surrounding area is mostly residential.

- Hokkaido Highway 440 Nishi-Obihiro Station Line
- Hokkaido Highway 214 Kawanishi-Memuro-Otofuke Line
- Hokkaido Highway 151 Makubetsu-Obihiro-Memuro Line
- Japan National Route 38
- Hokkaido Memuro High School
- Japan Beet Sugar Company, Memuro Sugar Refinery

== See also ==
- List of railway stations in Japan
