= Taisei Station =

Railway station in Memuro, Hokkaido, Japan

K28 Taisei Station 大成駅
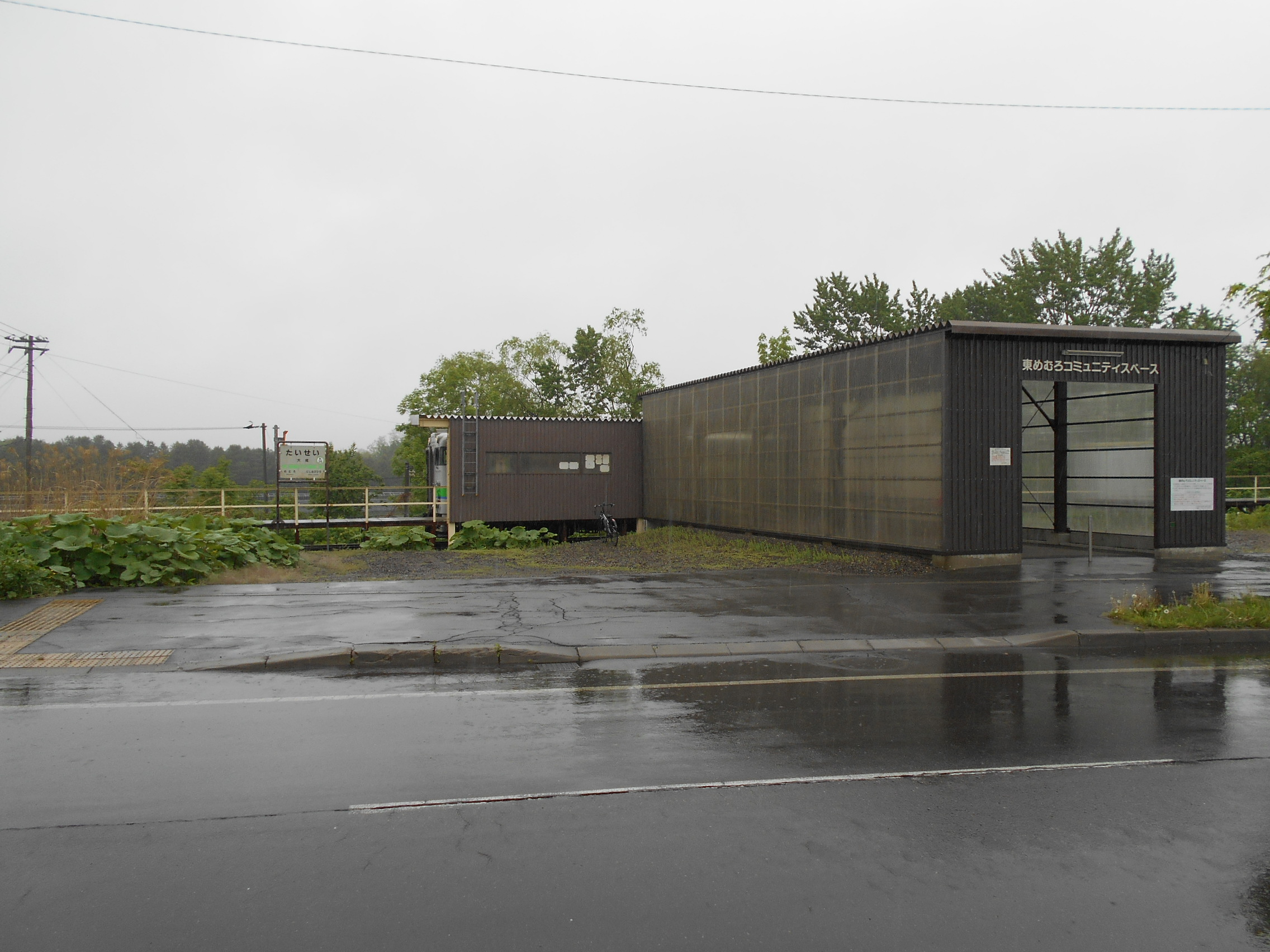
- Station building in May 2017

General information
- Location: 1 Sen Higashimemurominami, Memuro, Kasai District, Hokkaido 082-0006; Japan
- Coordinates: 42°54′58″N 143°04′11″E
- System: regional rail
- Operator: JR Hokkaido
- Line: Nemuro Main Line
- Distance: 32.3km from Shintoku
- Platforms: 1 side platform
- Tracks: 1

Construction
- Structure type: At-grade
- Accessible: No

Other information
- Status: Unstaffed
- Station code: K28
- Website: Official website

History
- Opened: 1 November 1986; 39 years ago

Passengers
- FY2014: 444 daily

Services
Preceding station	JR Hokkaido	Following station
Memuro towards Takikawa	Nemuro Main Line Local	Nishi-Obihiro towards Nemuro
Location
- Location within Hokkaido Location within Japan

Taisei Station (大成駅, Taisei-eki) is a railway station located in the town of Memuro, Kasai District, Hokkaidō, It is operated by JR Hokkaido.

== Lines ==
The station is served by the Nemuro Main Line, and lies 32.3 km from the starting point of the line at Shintoku.

== Layout ==
Taisei Station has one side platform serving a single bi-directional track. The station building is made from two modified shipping containers and is unattended.

=== Platforms ===
1	■ Nemuro Main Line	for Obihiro and Shintoku
2	■ Nemuro Main Line	for Kushiro

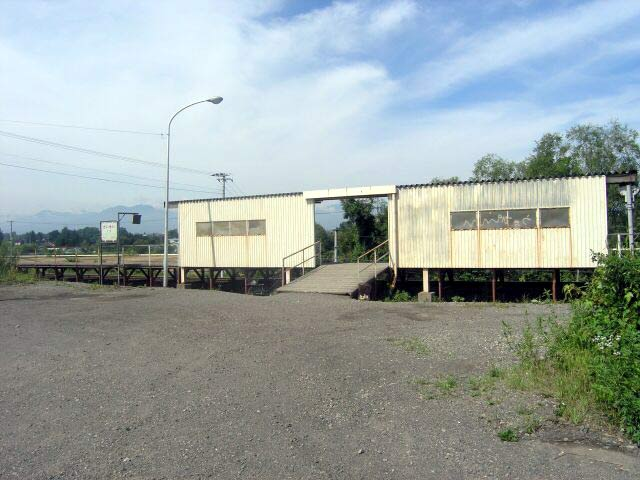
External view of the station

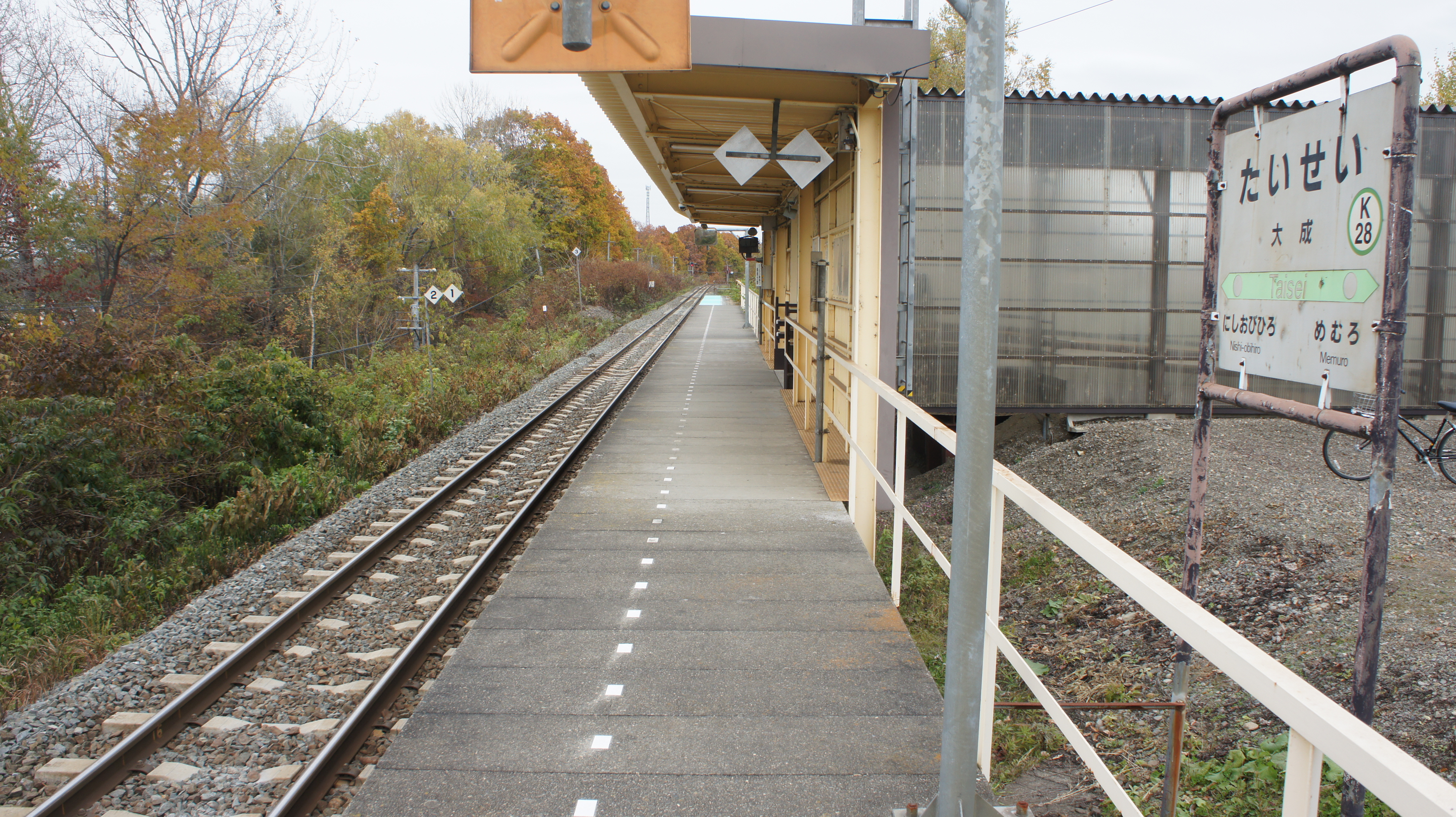
Platform

== History ==
Taisei Station opened on 1 November 1986.With the privatization of the Japan National Railway (JNR) on 1 April 1987, the station came under the aegis of the Hokkaido Railway Company (JR Hokkaido).

== Passenger statistics ==
In fiscal 2014, the station was used by 444 passengers daily.。

== Surrounding area ==
- Japan National Route 38
- Hokkaido Memuro High School
- Japan Beet Sugar Company, Memuro Sugar R

== See also ==
- List of railway stations in Japan
