= Obihiro University of Agriculture and Veterinary Medicine =

University in Obihiro, Hokkaido, Japan

Coordinates: 42°52′33.57″N 143°10′23.46″E

- 帯広畜産大学
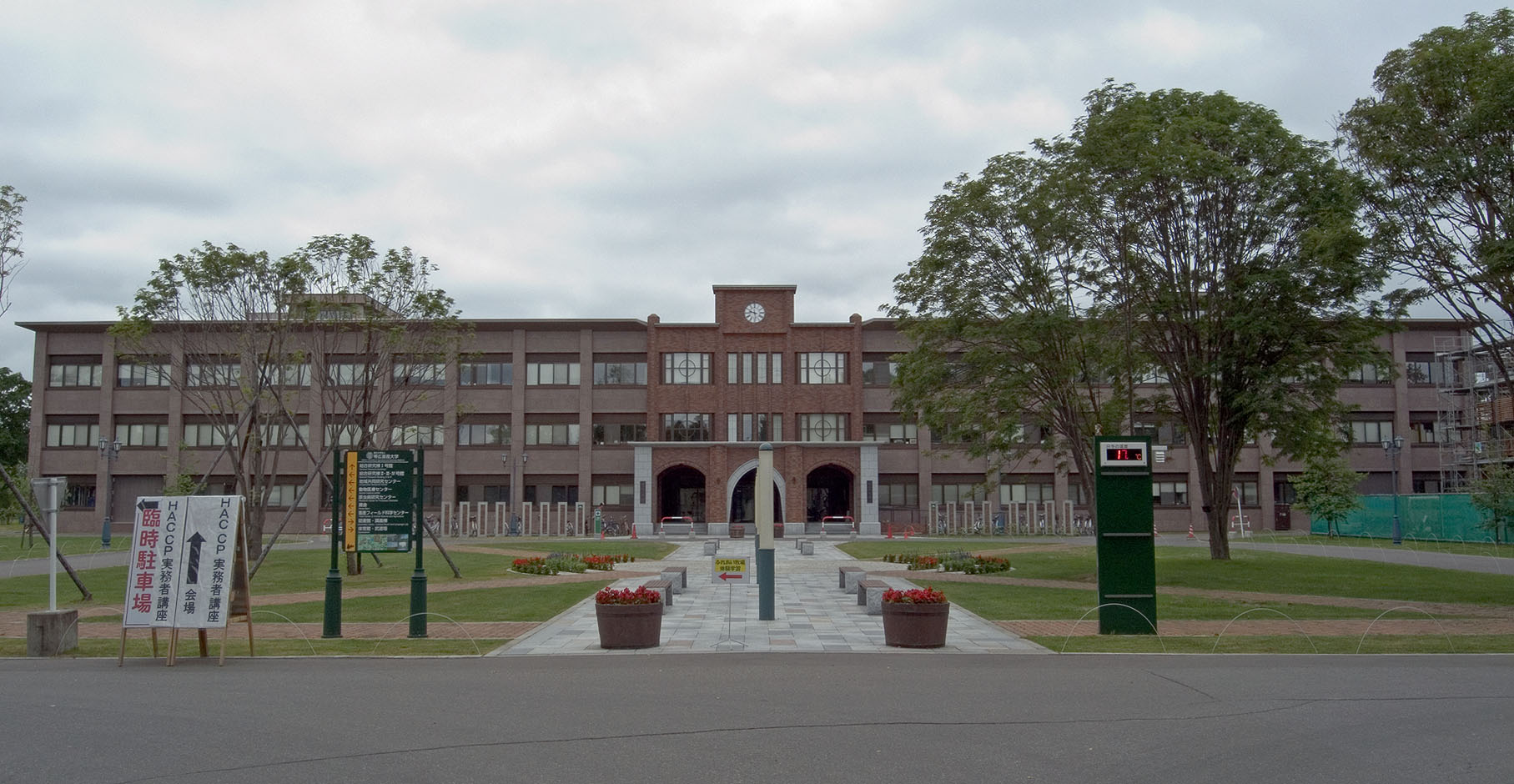
- Obihiro University of Agriculture and Veterinary Medicine campus
- Type: National
- Established: 1941; 85 years ago
- Students: 1,300
- Location: 2-11, Inadachonishi, Obihiro, Hokkaido, 080-0834, Japan
- Website: www.obihiro.ac.jp

Obihiro University of Agriculture and Veterinary Medicine (帯広畜産大学, Obihiro Chikusan Daigaku) is a university in Obihiro, Hokkaido, Japan, commonly referred to as Obihiro University. It was founded in 1941, as the Obihiro Technical School of Veterinary Medicine.

As of 2009, the university employs 136 faculty members and a full-time staff of over 100. It offers instruction to 1,300 students in bachelors, masters, and doctoral programs. The university accepts an average of 14 foreign students and sends out an average of seven study abroad students each year.

== Schools ==
This university has two schools below:

- School of Agriculture
- School of Cooperative Veterinary Medicine

== Graduate school ==
=== Master courses ===
- Master's Program in Animal Science and Agriculture
  - Laboratory of Veterinary Life Science
  - Laboratory of Animal Production Science
  - Laboratory of Ecology and Environmental Science
  - Laboratory of Food Science
  - Laboratory of Agricultural Economics
  - Laboratory of Engineering for Agriculture
  - Laboratory of Plant Production Science

=== Doctoral courses ===
- Doctoral Program of Animal Science and Agriculture
  - Faculty of Doctoral Program of Animal Science and Agriculture
- Doctoral Program of Veterinary Science
  - Faculty of Doctoral Program of Veterinary Science

== Departments ==
This university has four departments

- Department of Veterinary Medicine
- Department of Life and Food Sciences
- Department of Agro-environmental Science
- Department of Human Sciences
