= Hakurindai Station =

Railway station in Obihiro, Hokkaido, Japan

K30 Hakurindai Station 柏林台駅
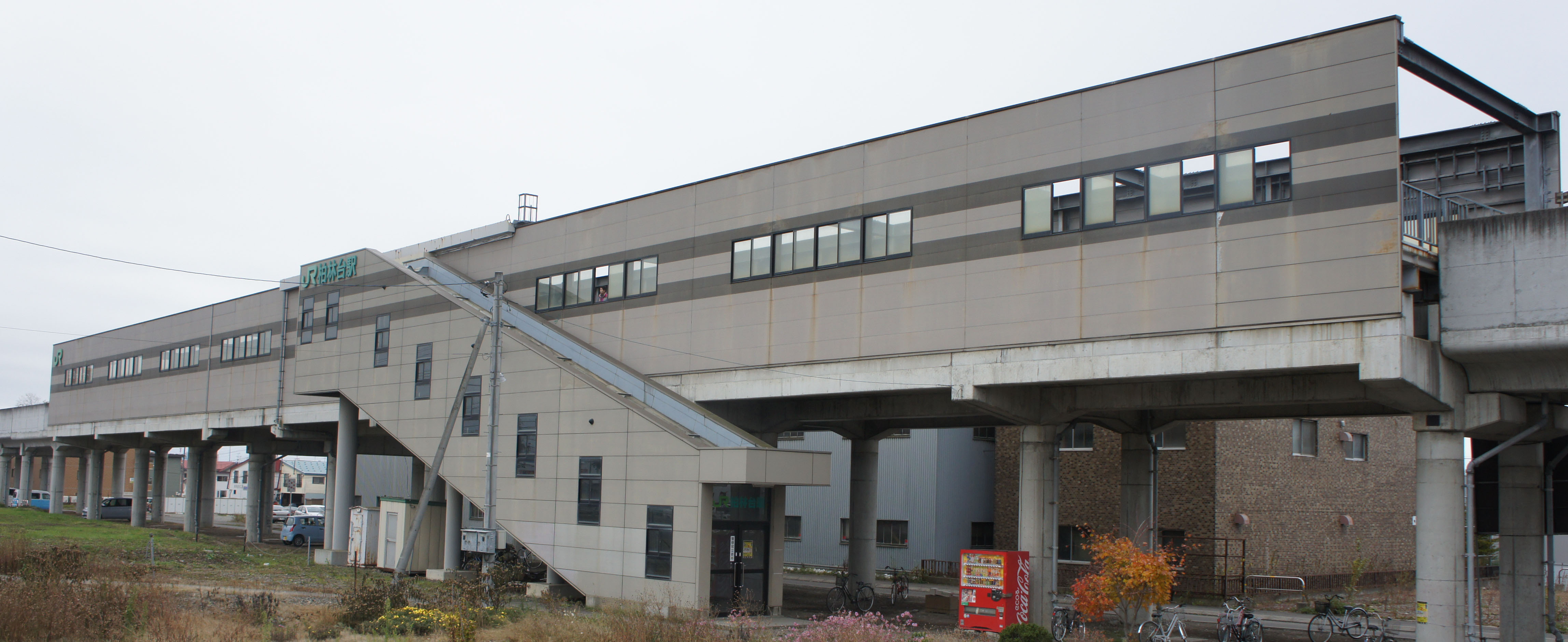
- Station building in October 2017

General information
- Location: 1-chōme-16 Nishi 17 Jōminami, Obihiro, Hokkaido 080-0027; Japan
- Coordinates: 42°55′43.87″N 143°9′52.2″E
- System: regional rail
- Operator: JR Hokkaido
- Line: Nemuro Main Line
- Distance: 40.3km from Shintoku
- Platforms: 1 side platform

Construction
- Structure type: Elevated
- Accessible: No

Other information
- Status: Unstaffed
- Station code: K30
- Website: Official website

History
- Opened: 1 November 1986; 39 years ago

Passengers
- FY2014: 296 daily

Services
Preceding station	JR Hokkaido	Following station
Nishi-Obihiro towards Takikawa	Nemuro Main Line Local	Obihiro towards Nemuro
Location
- Location within Hokkaido Location within Japan

Hakurindai Station (柏林台駅, Hakurindai-eki) is a railway station located in the city of Obihiro, Tokachi Subprefecture, Hokkaidō, It is operated by JR Hokkaido.

== Lines ==
The station is served by the Nemuro Main Line, and lies 40.3 km from the starting point of the line at Shintoku.

== Layout ==
Hakurindai Station has one elevated side platform, with the station facilities located underneath. The station building is unattended.

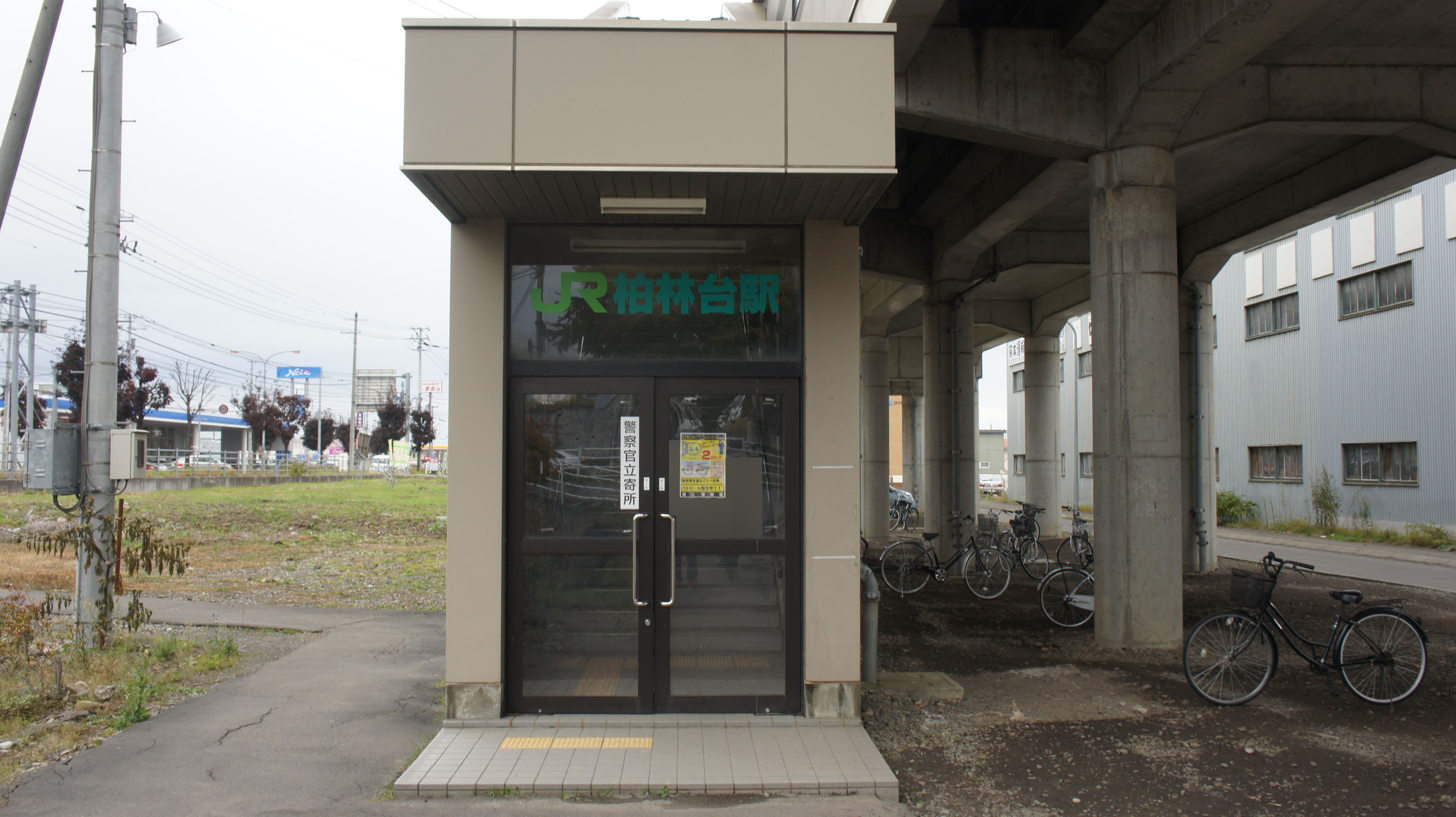
Entrance

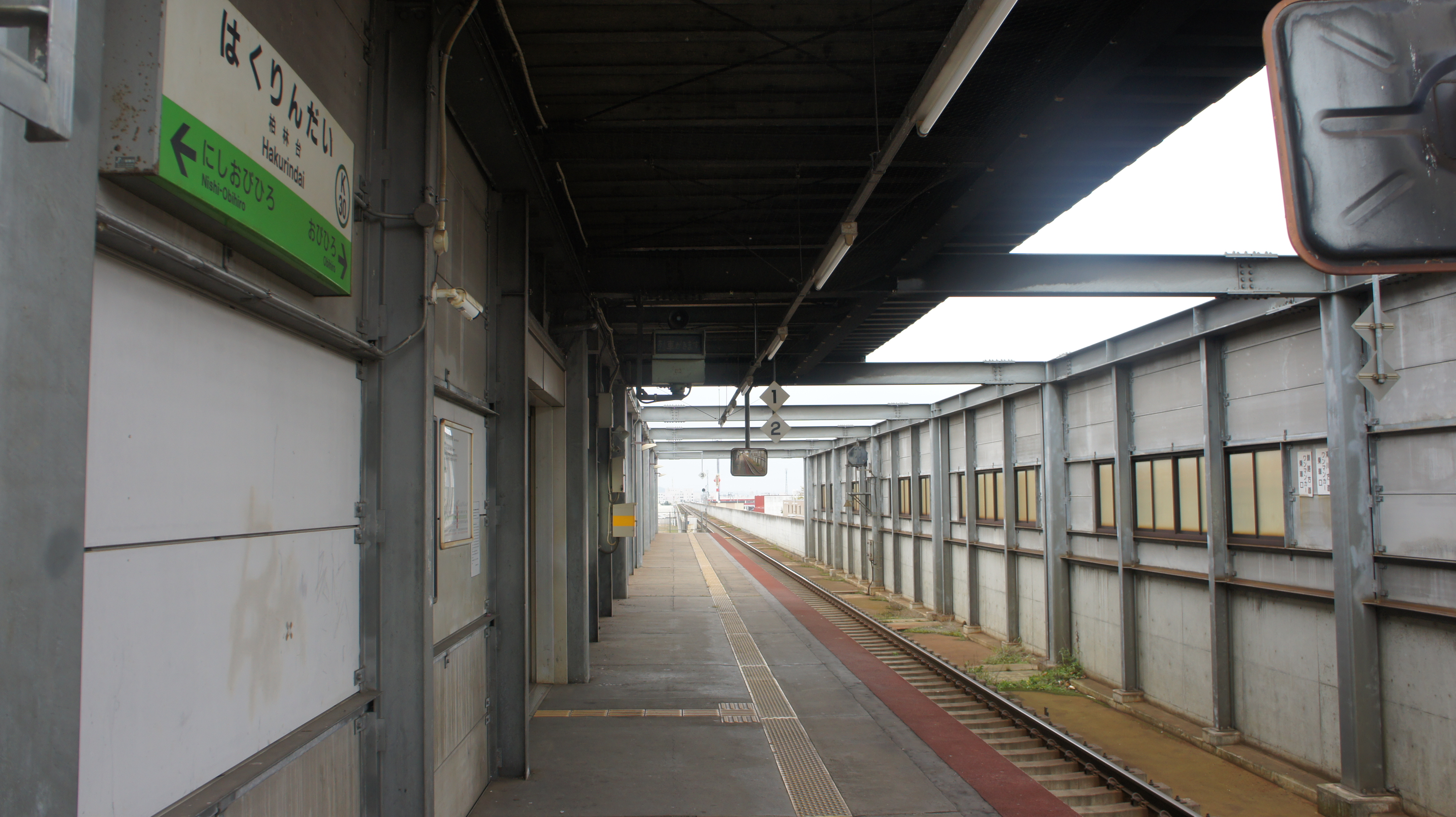
Platform

== History ==
Hakurindai Station opened on 1 November 1986. With the privatization of the Japan National Railway (JNR) on 1 April 1987, the station came under the aegis of the Hokkaido Railway Company (JR Hokkaido).

== Passenger statistics ==
In fiscal 2014, the station was used by 296 passengers daily.。

== Surrounding area ==
South of the station is the Hakurindai housing complex, home to a number of large apartment buildings, and the surrounding area is largely residential. There are also many commercial facilities, including supermarkets.

- Hokkaido Highway 715
- Japan National Route 38
- Japan National Route 241

== See also ==
- List of railway stations in Japan
