= Butadon =

Japanese dish

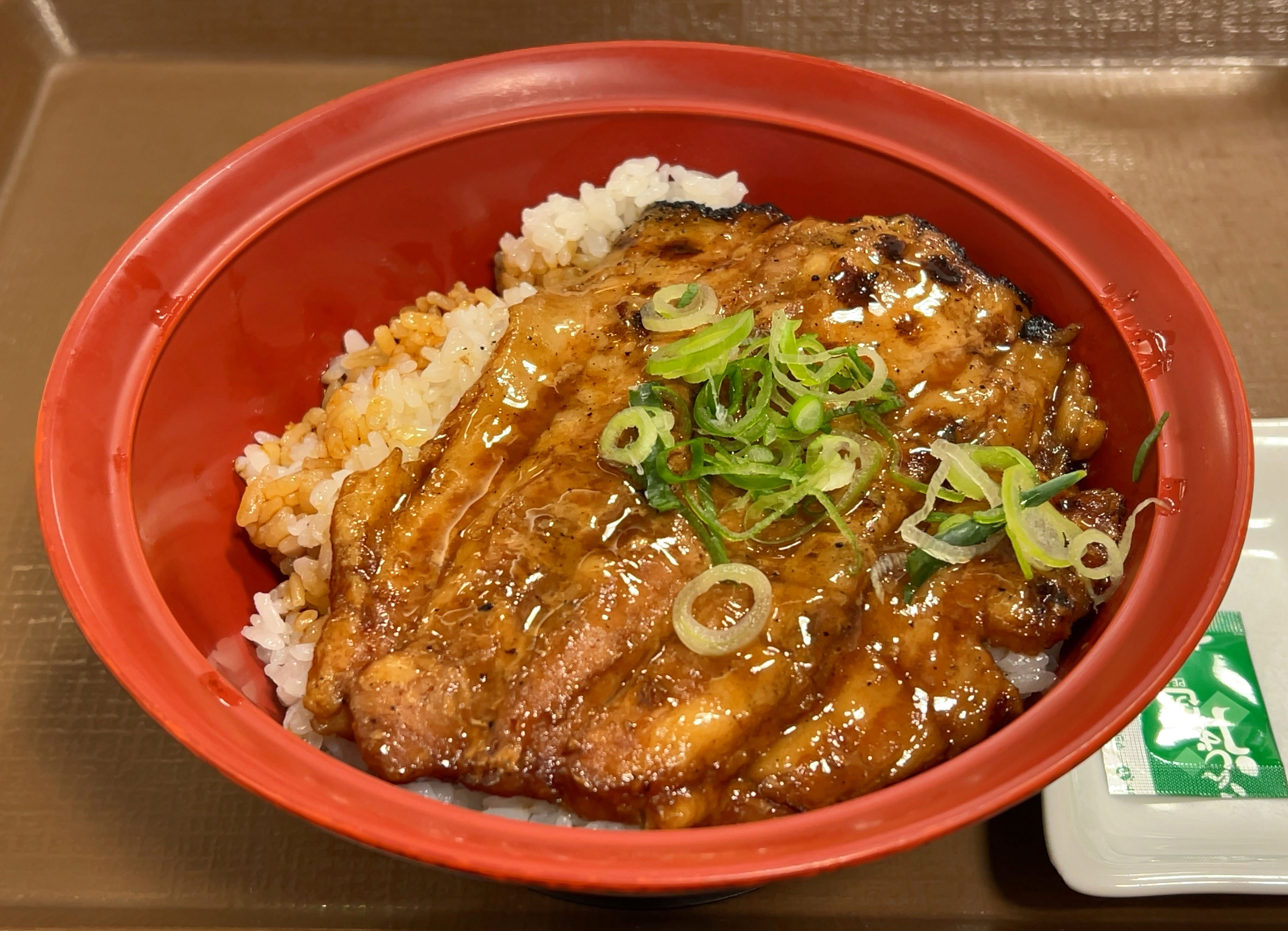
- Butadon, rice topped with pork
- Course: Main
- Place of origin: Japan
- Main ingredients: Pork, Japanese rice, takuan

Butadon (豚丼), often literally translated into English as pork bowl, is a Japanese dish consisting of a bowl of rice topped with pork simmered in a mildly sweet sauce. It also often includes a sprinkling of green peas. A popular food in Japan, it is commonly served with takuan. Buta means "pig" or "pork", and don is short for donburi, the Japanese word for "bowl".

== History ==
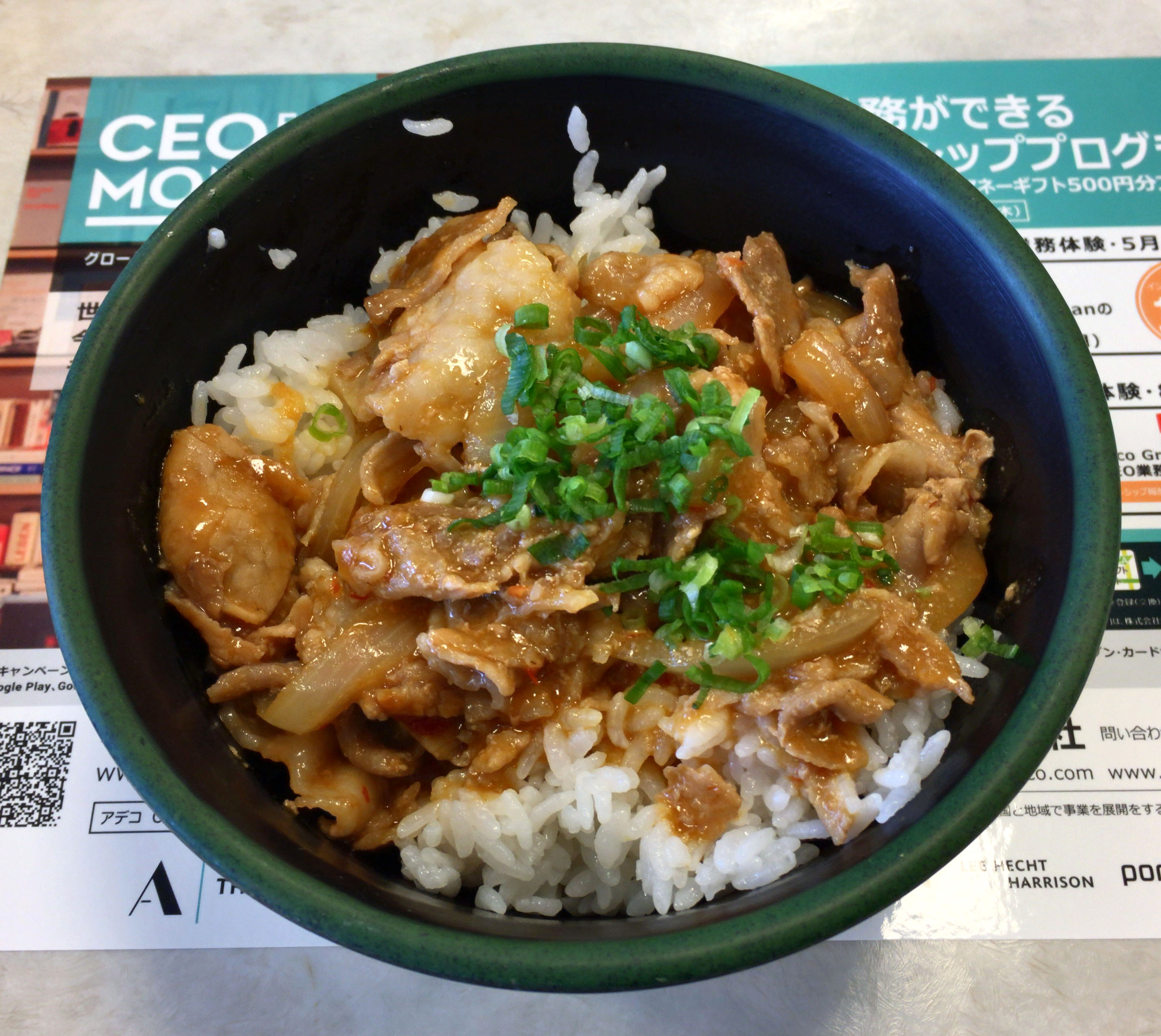
Butadon with miso sauce

Butadon originated from the city of Obihiro, Japan.

1. Butadon originated from the city of Obihiro, Japan. This version is known as Obihiro butadon.
2. Butadon originated as an alternative offered by Gyūdon chain stores in response to the 2003 outbreak of Bovine spongiform encephalopathy. This version is known as Gyūdon chain butadon.

== Obihiro Butadon ==
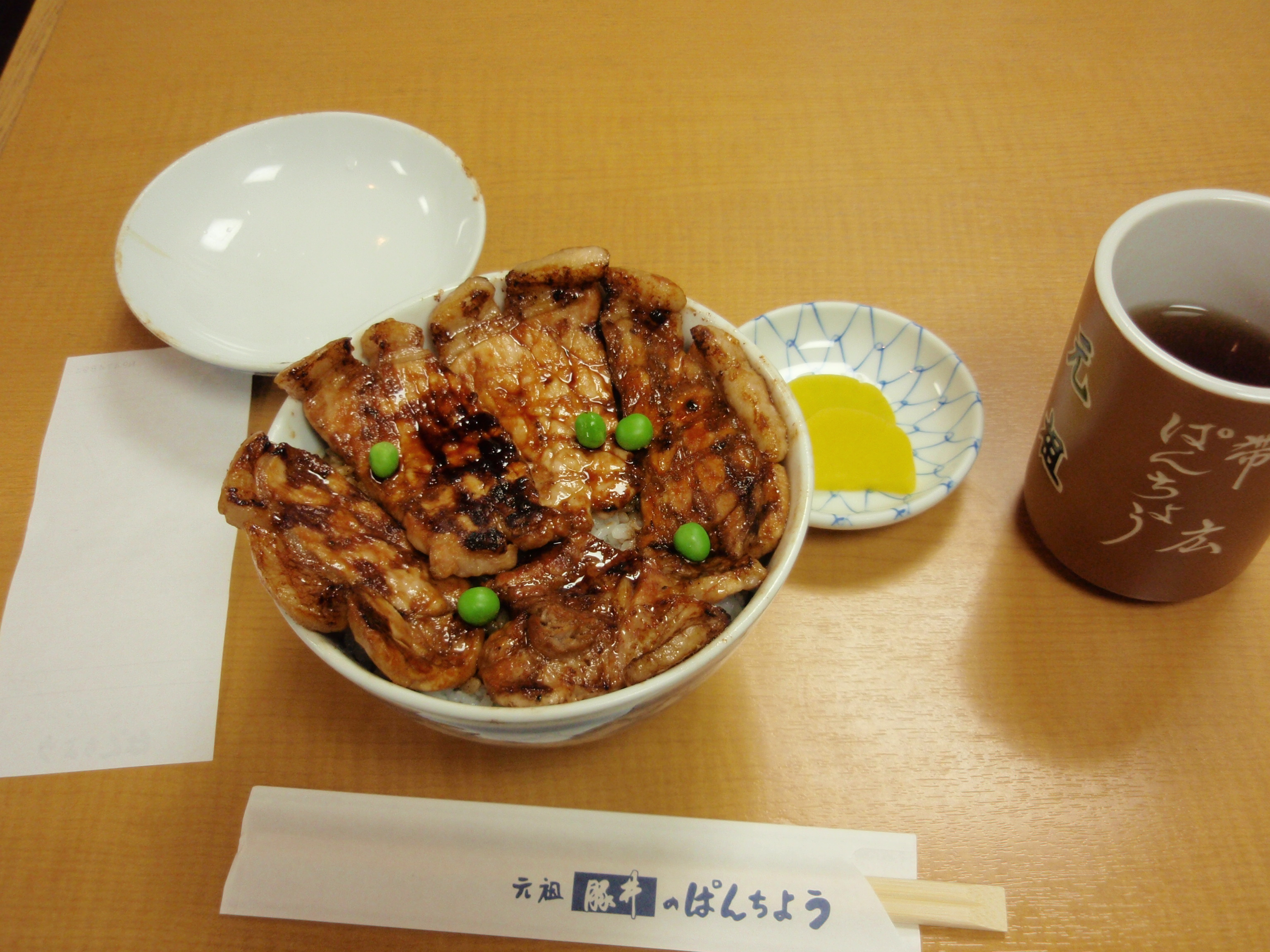
Obihiro style butadon

The Tokachi Subprefecture style of butadon is a bowl of rice topped with pork cooked with a sweet and spicy sauce. The founder of Pancho, a popular restaurant in Obihiro, is considered responsible for the dish's creation.

Raising pigs in the Tokachi region started around the end of the Meiji era and since then pork became very popular. Pancho's founder wanted to provide an invigorating dish for laborers, so eel was considered as an ingredient, but eel was difficult to obtain. Thus, pork was selected due to its ready availability.

In 2003, to differentiate from Gyūdon chain butadon, this style of butadon is referred to as "Obihiro butadon", "Obihiro style butadon", or "Tokachi butadon".

This dish is offered in many restaurants in eastern Hokkaido as a Tokachi specialty and eaten with additional seasonings of sugar and soy sauce. Some stores differ in preparation of the pork (grilled or teppanyaki) and toppings (the whites of green onions, green peas).

== Gyūdon chain butadon ==
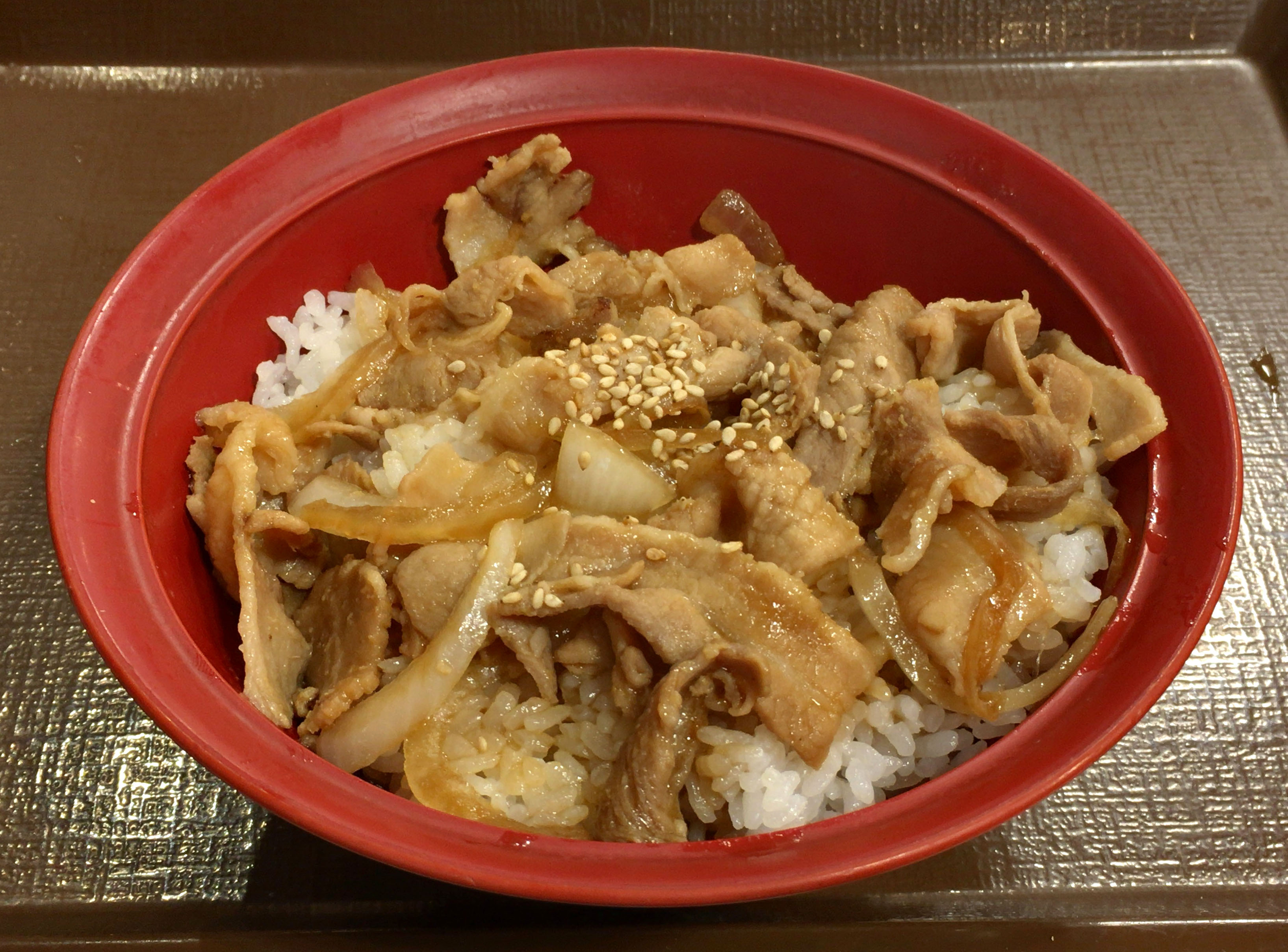
Butadon from Sukiya restaurant

Gyūdon chain butadon is a dish with thinly sliced pork simmered in warishita (a sauce mixture of sake, soy sauce, sugar, mirin, and dashi), placed on top of rice, along with toppings such as onions and burdock roots.

Gyūdon chains refer to their own butadon dishes differently. The Japanese character for buta that makes up butadon is typically read using Kun'yomi, but Sukiya uses On'yomi instead. The provided names below utilize romaji.

- Matsuya Foods: Butameshi
- Yoshinoya: Butadon
- Sukiya: Tondon
- Nakau: Butadonburi

== Gallery ==
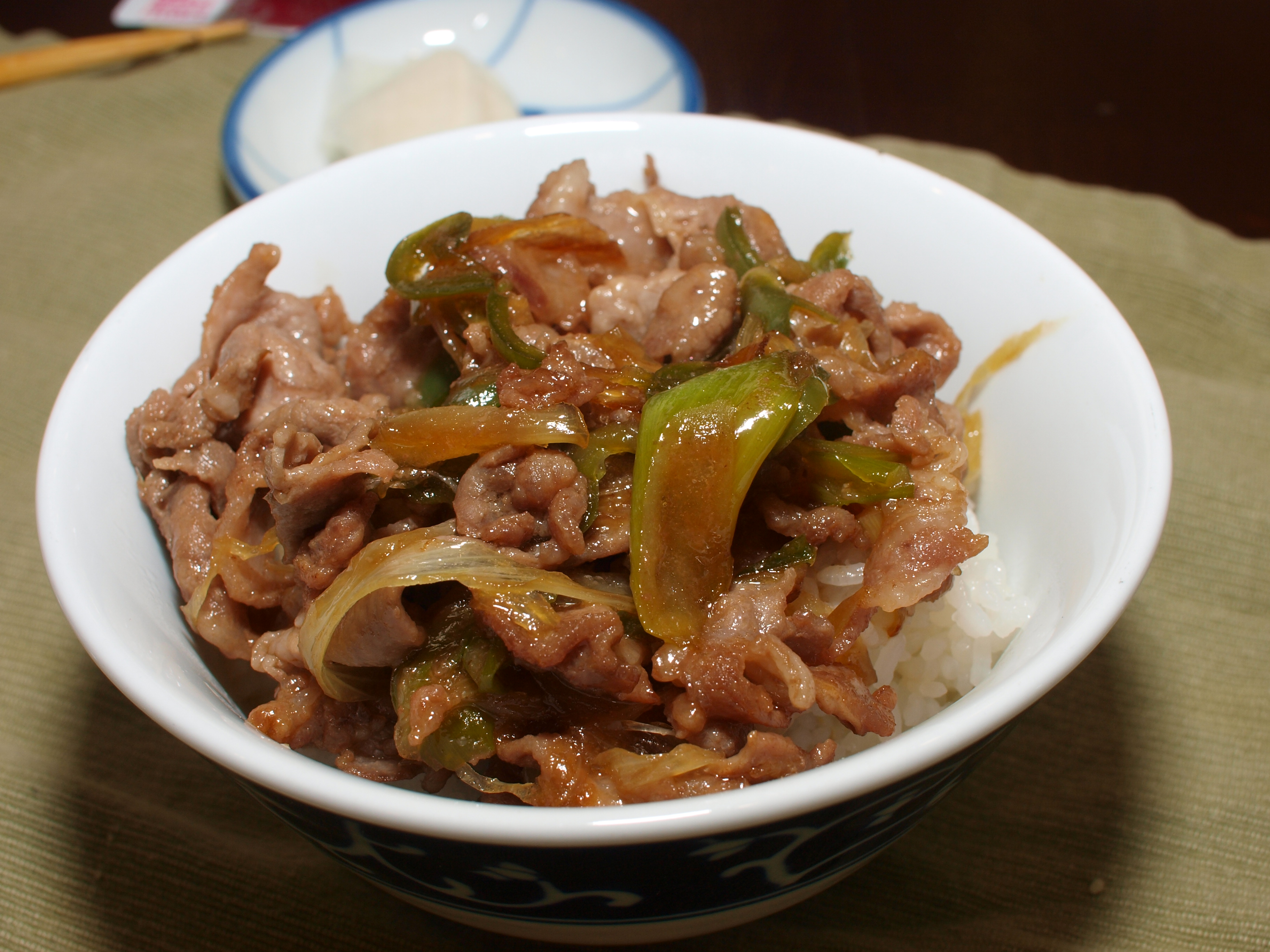

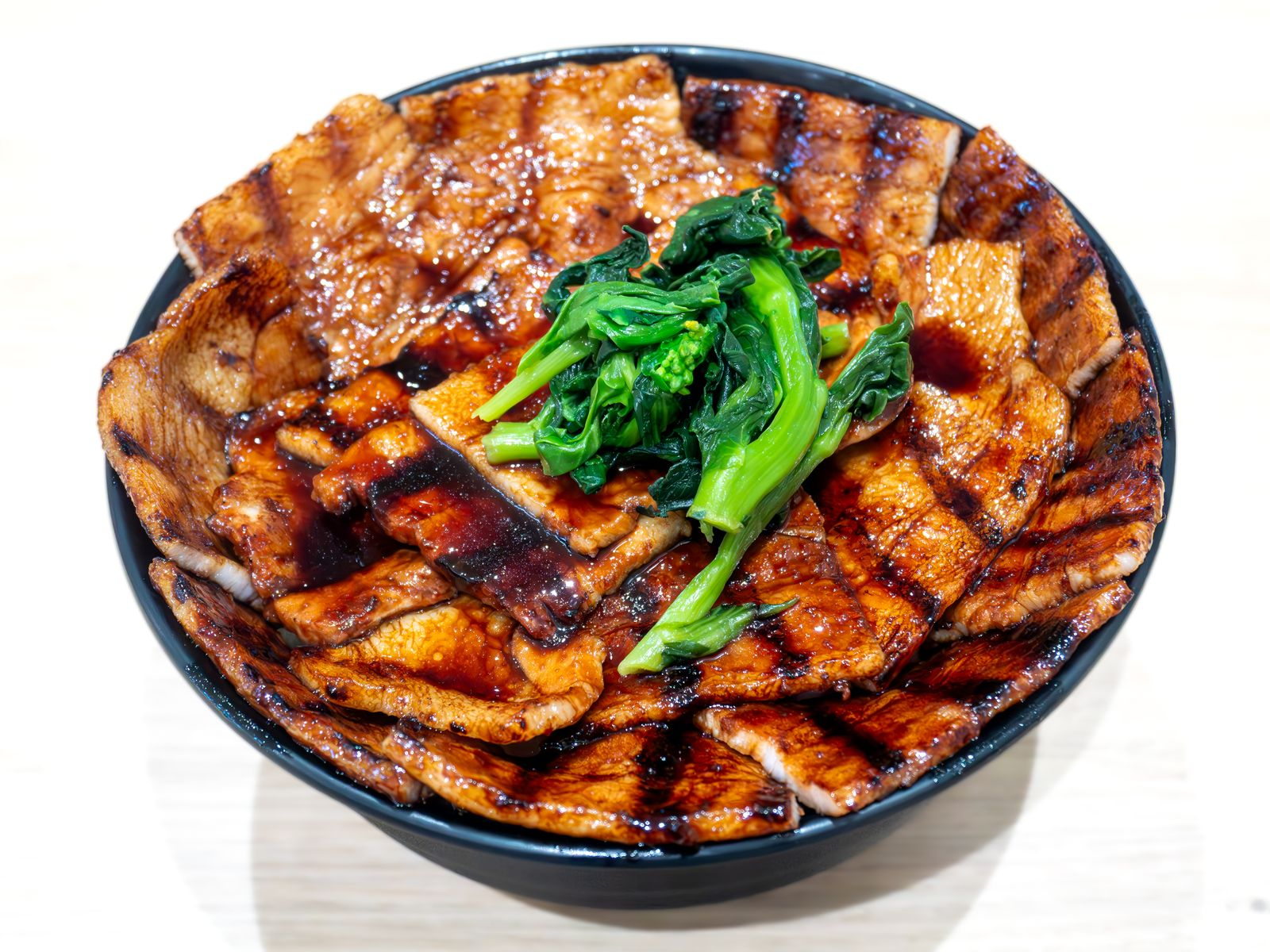

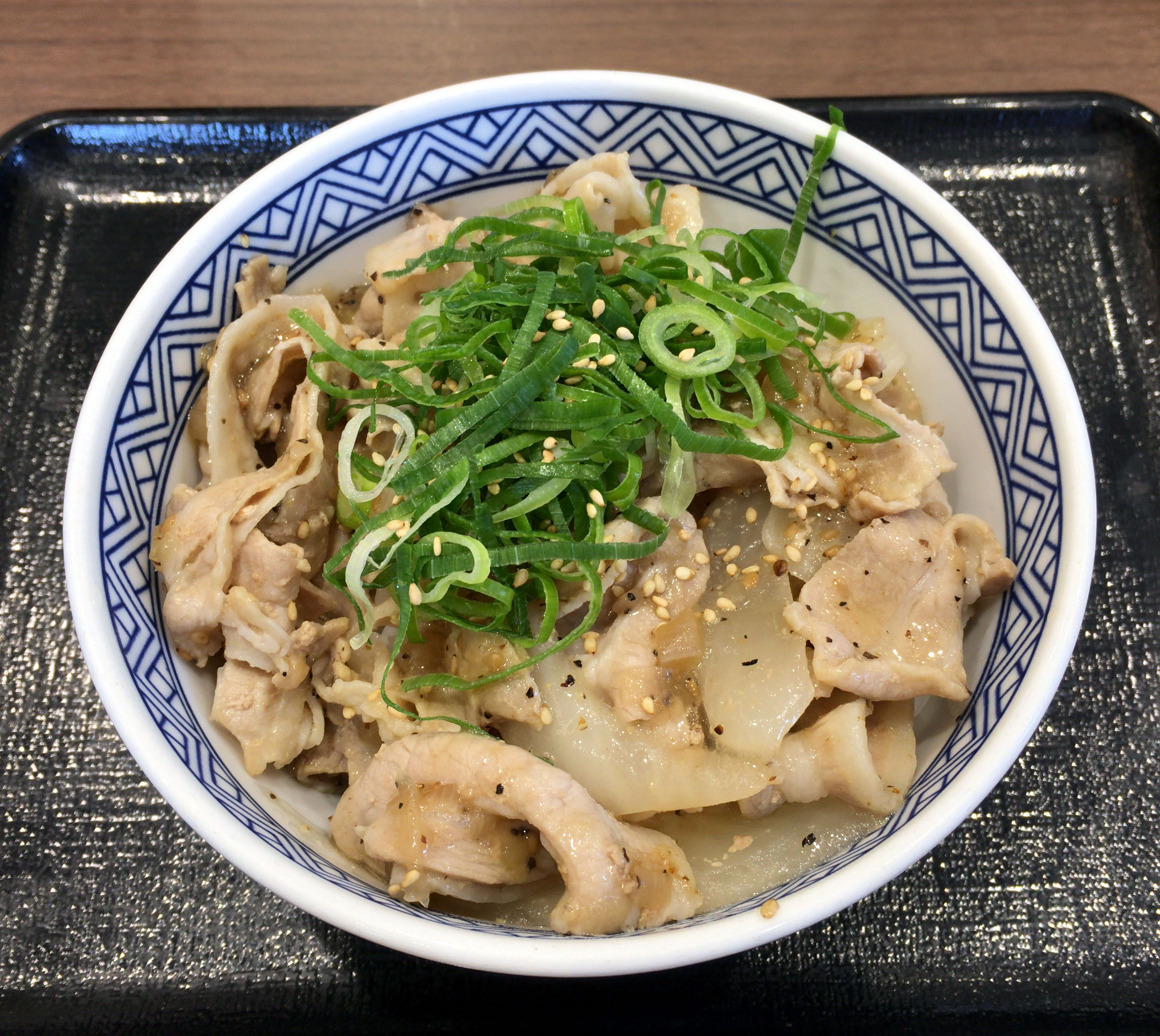
With negi onions, from Yoshinoya

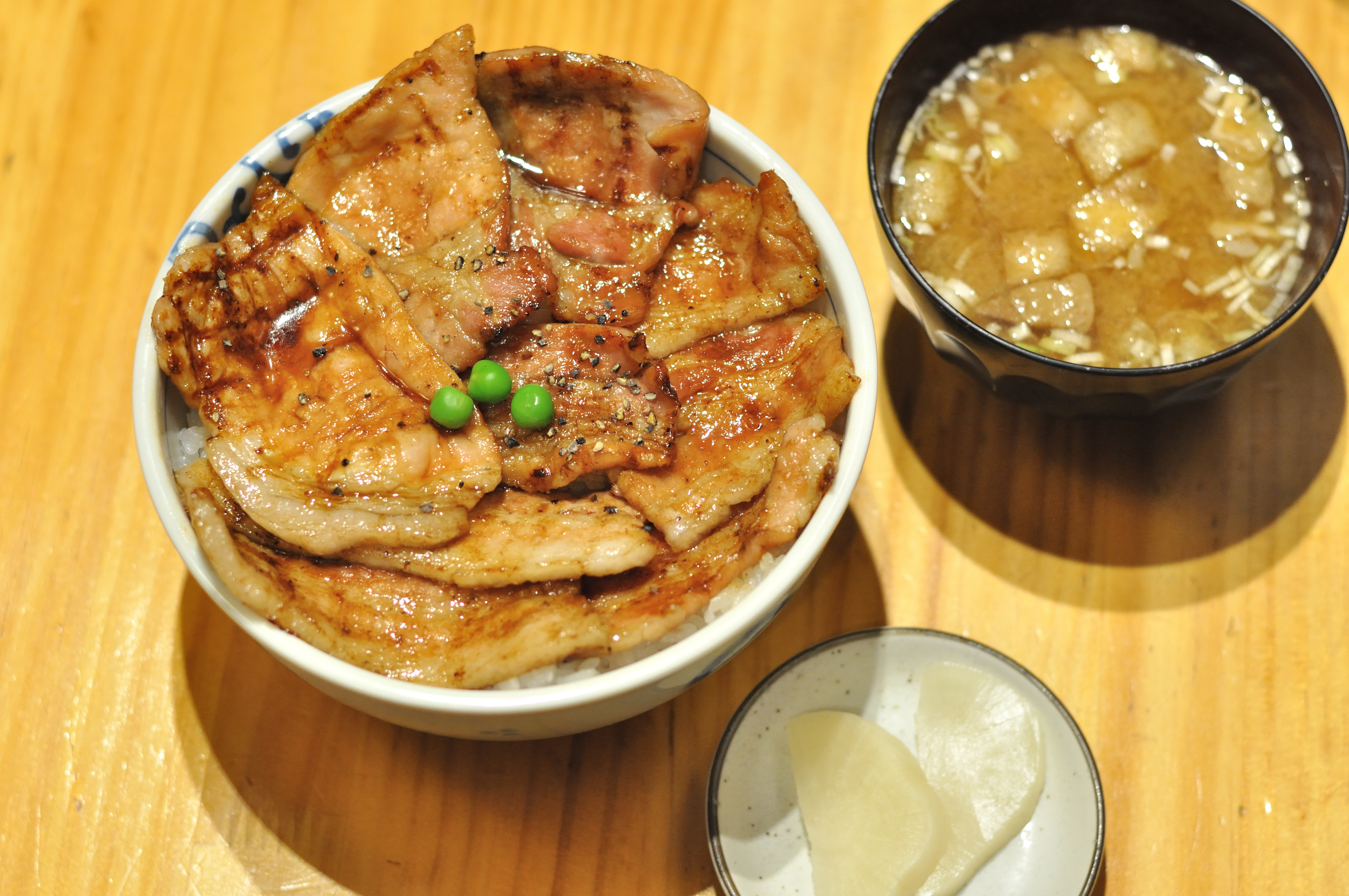
With takuan pickles and miso soup

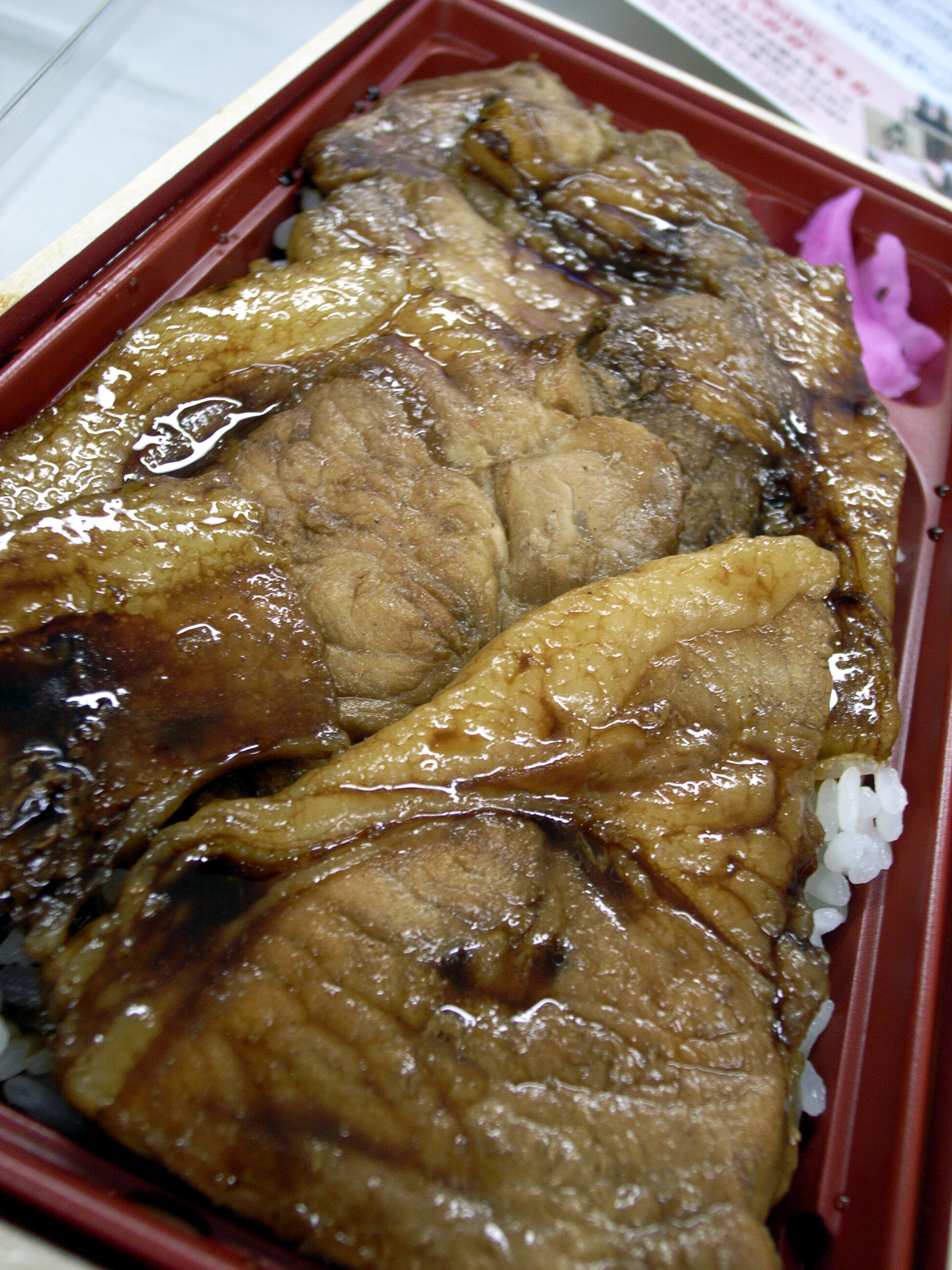
As bento

== See also ==
- Gyūdon
