= Obihiro =

Obihiro 帯広市
- City
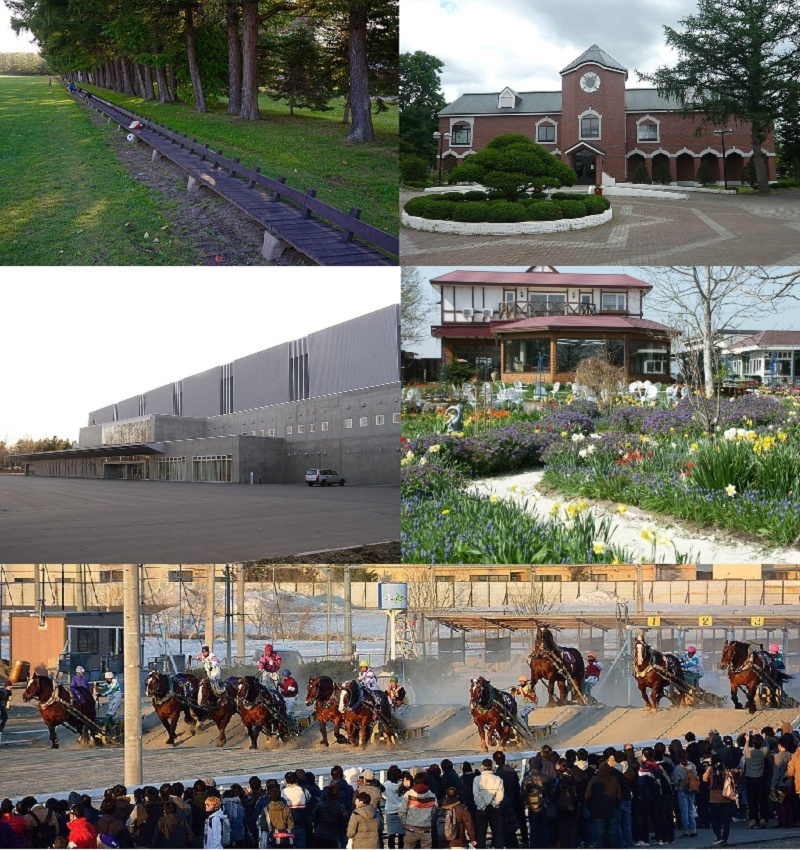

- Flag Seal

- Location of Obihiro in Hokkaido (Tokachi Subprefecture)
- Interactive map of Obihiro
- Coordinates: 42°55′26″N 143°11′46″E
- Country: Japan
- Region: Hokkaido
- Prefecture: Hokkaido (Tokachi Subprefecture)

Government
  - Mayor: Yōsuke Ueno (上野庸介) - from April 2026

Area
  - Total: 619.34 km^{2} (239.13 sq mi)

Population (December 31, 2025)
  - Total: 159,294
  - Density: 257.20/km^{2} (666.14/sq mi)
- Time zone: UTC+09:00 (JST)
- City hall address: West 5 South 7-1, Obihiro-shi, Hokkaidō 080-8670
- Website: www.city.obihiro.hokkaido.jp
- Symbols
- Bird: Eurasian skylark
- Flower: Kamchatka lily
- Tree: Japanese white birch

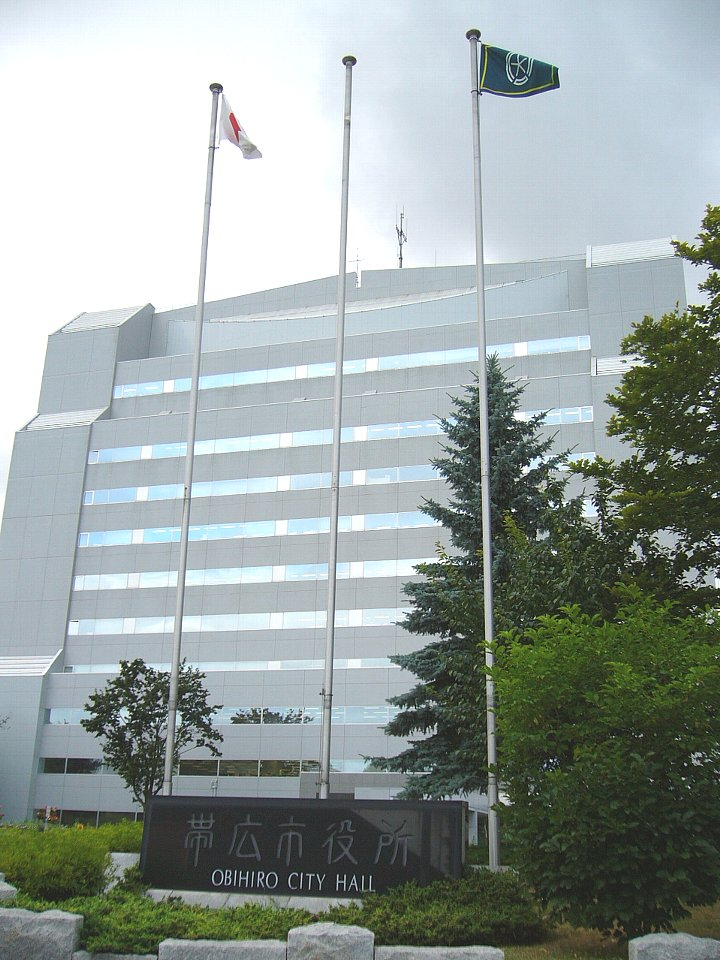
Obihiro City-hall

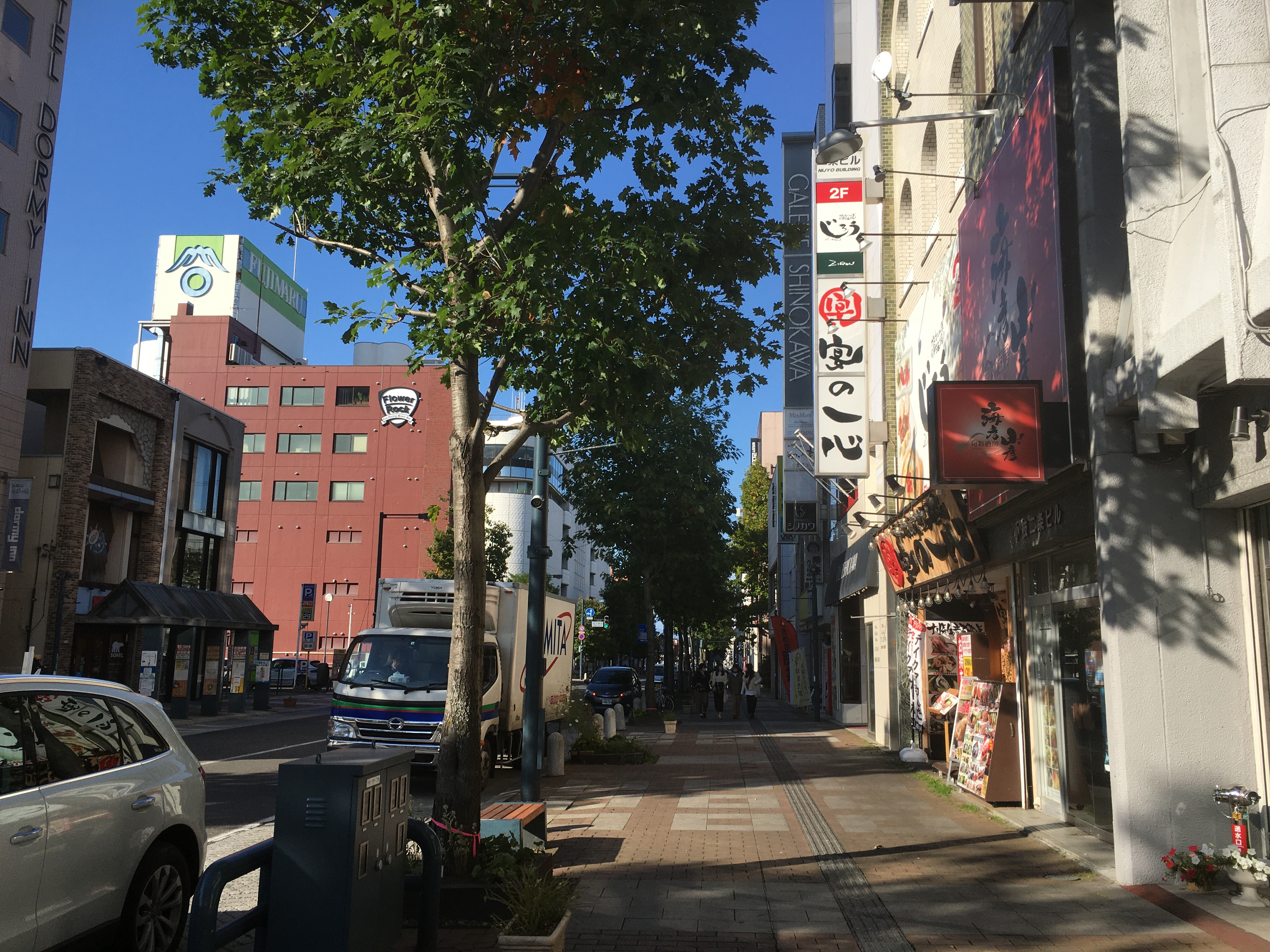
Street in Obihiro, 2020

Obihiro (帯広市, Obihiro-shi; Japanese pronunciation: [ò̞.bʲí.çí.ɾó̞(.ɕì)]) is a city located in Tokachi Subprefecture, Hokkaidō, Japan. As of 31 December 2025, the city had an estimated population of 159,294 in 90105 households, and a population density of 257 people per km^{2}. The total area of the city is 619.34 km^{2} (239.13 sq mi). The next most populous municipality in Tokachi is the adjacent town of Otofuke, with less than a third of Obihiro's population. In 2008, Obihiro was designated a "model environmental city" in Japan.

== Geography ==
Obihiro is located in southeastern Hokkaido, almost in the center of the Tokachi Plain, with its boundaries extending to the southwest. The mountainous region is designated as Hidakasanmyaku-Erimo-Tokachi National Park. Approximately half of the plains are farmland, forming a large-scale field cropping area. The Tokachi River, the sixth largest river basin in Japan, flows through the northern part of the city.

=== Neighboring municipalities ===
- Otofuke
- Memuro
- Sarabetsu
- Nakasatsunai
- Makubetsu
- Biratori
- Hidaka
- Niikappu

=== Rivers ===
Obihiro has one of Japan's most pristine rivers flowing through its city limits. Japan's Ministry of Land, Infrastructure, Transport and Tourism has chosen Obihiro's Satsunai River, which joins the Tokachi River outside of town, as the cleanest Class A river in Japan seven times since 1991. It is designated as a Class A River by the Japanese government due to its importance to environmental conservation and the national economy. In the Ainu language, Satnay means "dry river", and even today, most of its 82 km (51 mi) run is shallow. The city draws most of its drinking water from the Satsunai. The biggest pollutant in the river is nitrates from fertilizer run off from all the farming operations along the river's banks. The other major river in the city is the Tokachi, but its water is not used for drinking as it has much higher pollution levels.

=== Forests ===
In 1974, a plan for the creation of an expansive city recreation space was initiated, and from 1975 to 2004 large groups of Obihiro citizens participated in "Tree Planting Festivals" (市民植樹祭). These actions have resulted in the creation of a new forest; the Obihiro no Mori (帯広の森). Recently, tree planting in the forest has been limited to small projects due to a lack of space to plant more trees.

=== Demographics ===
Per Japanese census data, the population of Obihiro has remained relatively stable in recent decades. The city had approximately 500 foreign residents in 2008.

Historical population
Year	Pop.	±%
1970	131,568	—
1980	153,861	+16.9%
1990	167,384	+8.8%
2000	173,030	+3.4%
2010	167,860	−3.0%
2020	166,536	−0.8%

== Climate ==
Obihiro has a humid continental climate (Köppen: Dfb) with warm summers and cold winters, very similar to the coast of New England (although the lower averages are with more extreme records). Precipitation falls throughout the year, but is higher in late summer and early Fall.

Climate data for Obihiro (elevation 38.4 m, 1991–2020 normals, extremes 1892–present)
Month	Jan	Feb	Mar	Apr	May	Jun	Jul	Aug	Sep	Oct	Nov	Dec	Year
Record high °C (°F)	8.0 (46.4)	14.7 (58.5)	20.3 (68.5)	31.7 (89.1)	38.8 (101.8)	36.0 (96.8)	38.8 (101.8)	37.0 (98.6)	34.4 (93.9)	29.7 (85.5)	23.5 (74.3)	16.0 (60.8)	38.8 (101.8)
Mean maximum °C (°F)	4.0 (39.2)	6.2 (43.2)	13.2 (55.8)	23.0 (73.4)	28.6 (83.5)	30.8 (87.4)	32.5 (90.5)	33.1 (91.6)	29.4 (84.9)	23.0 (73.4)	17.0 (62.6)	7.5 (45.5)	34.2 (93.6)
Mean daily maximum °C (°F)	−1.5 (29.3)	−0.2 (31.6)	4.8 (40.6)	12.2 (54.0)	18.2 (64.8)	21.3 (70.3)	24.3 (75.7)	25.4 (77.7)	22.0 (71.6)	15.9 (60.6)	8.4 (47.1)	1.0 (33.8)	12.7 (54.9)
Daily mean °C (°F)	−6.9 (19.6)	−5.7 (21.7)	−0.4 (31.3)	6.0 (42.8)	11.6 (52.9)	15.2 (59.4)	18.9 (66.0)	20.3 (68.5)	16.9 (62.4)	10.3 (50.5)	3.5 (38.3)	−3.8 (25.2)	7.2 (45.0)
Mean daily minimum °C (°F)	−13.0 (8.6)	−12.0 (10.4)	−5.4 (22.3)	0.8 (33.4)	6.2 (43.2)	10.8 (51.4)	15.1 (59.2)	16.5 (61.7)	12.7 (54.9)	5.3 (41.5)	−1.1 (30.0)	−8.9 (16.0)	2.2 (36.0)
Mean minimum °C (°F)	−20.7 (−5.3)	−20.5 (−4.9)	−13.7 (7.3)	−4.3 (24.3)	0.5 (32.9)	5.8 (42.4)	10.7 (51.3)	11.7 (53.1)	6.1 (43.0)	−1.2 (29.8)	−7.8 (18.0)	−16.9 (1.6)	−21.7 (−7.1)
Record low °C (°F)	−38.2 (−36.8)	−36.0 (−32.8)	−35.2 (−31.4)	−22.4 (−8.3)	−7.9 (17.8)	−1.9 (28.6)	1.8 (35.2)	2.1 (35.8)	−4.7 (23.5)	−10.6 (12.9)	−20.3 (−4.5)	−34.2 (−29.6)	−38.2 (−36.8)
Average precipitation mm (inches)	40.5 (1.59)	28.8 (1.13)	43.8 (1.72)	60.1 (2.37)	84.7 (3.33)	81.1 (3.19)	107.1 (4.22)	141.3 (5.56)	140.2 (5.52)	85.7 (3.37)	54.2 (2.13)	52.3 (2.06)	919.7 (36.21)
Average snowfall cm (inches)	52 (20)	37 (15)	36 (14)	9 (3.5)	1 (0.4)	0 (0)	0 (0)	0 (0)	0 (0)	0 (0)	10 (3.9)	51 (20)	198 (78)
Average precipitation days (≥ 0.5 mm)	6.2	5.6	8.5	9.7	10.3	9.6	11.1	12.0	11.6	8.8	8.1	7.3	108.9
Average snowy days	13.8	14.8	16.4	9.1	0.4	0.0	0.0	0.0	0.0	1.2	9.8	13.6	79.2
Average relative humidity (%)	69	67	65	65	69	79	82	82	80	74	68	68	72
Mean monthly sunshine hours	188.2	191.5	217.9	192.9	188.8	148.2	121.9	125.2	137.8	167.6	168.2	172.0	2,020.1
Source: Japan Meteorological Agency (1991–2020 normals, extremes 1892–present)

Climate data for Obihiro Izumi, Obihiro (elevation 149 m, 2003–2020 normals, snowfall 2006–2020, extremes 2003–present)
Month	Jan	Feb	Mar	Apr	May	Jun	Jul	Aug	Sep	Oct	Nov	Dec	Year
Record high °C (°F)	5.4 (41.7)	14.4 (57.9)	15.8 (60.4)	29.2 (84.6)	37.8 (100.0)	35.0 (95.0)	36.0 (96.8)	35.8 (96.4)	32.3 (90.1)	27.3 (81.1)	21.2 (70.2)	12.0 (53.6)	37.8 (100.0)
Mean daily maximum °C (°F)	−3 (27)	−1.9 (28.6)	3.1 (37.6)	10.2 (50.4)	17.2 (63.0)	20.1 (68.2)	22.9 (73.2)	24.5 (76.1)	21.2 (70.2)	15.1 (59.2)	7.7 (45.9)	0.0 (32.0)	11.4 (52.5)
Daily mean °C (°F)	−9.3 (15.3)	−7.8 (18.0)	−1.9 (28.6)	4.6 (40.3)	10.8 (51.4)	14.5 (58.1)	18.0 (64.4)	19.6 (67.3)	15.9 (60.6)	9.1 (48.4)	2.2 (36.0)	−5.8 (21.6)	5.8 (42.4)
Mean daily minimum °C (°F)	−16.9 (1.6)	−15.7 (3.7)	−8.2 (17.2)	−1.2 (29.8)	4.7 (40.5)	9.8 (49.6)	14.1 (57.4)	15.6 (60.1)	11.1 (52.0)	3.0 (37.4)	−3.5 (25.7)	−12.6 (9.3)	0.0 (32.0)
Record low °C (°F)	−26.7 (−16.1)	−29.6 (−21.3)	−22.6 (−8.7)	−12.5 (9.5)	−3.8 (25.2)	0.3 (32.5)	4.7 (40.5)	5.5 (41.9)	0.3 (32.5)	−5.6 (21.9)	−16.7 (1.9)	−25.3 (−13.5)	−29.6 (−21.3)
Average precipitation mm (inches)	—	—	—	—	78.0 (3.07)	83.3 (3.28)	94.1 (3.70)	123.2 (4.85)	126.2 (4.97)	93.0 (3.66)	—	—	—
Average snowfall cm (inches)	60 (24)	64 (25)	54 (21)	25 (9.8)	1 (0.4)	0 (0)	0 (0)	0 (0)	0 (0)	2 (0.8)	19 (7.5)	69 (27)	298 (117)
Average precipitation days (≥ 1.0 mm)	—	—	—	—	7.6	8.8	9.1	10.2	9.6	8.2	—	—	—
Source: Japan Meteorological Agency (2003–2020 normals, snowfall 2006–2020, extremes 2003–present)

== History ==
Obihiro was the area first settled by Yoda Benzō in May 1883. It became a city on April 1, 1933. In 1957 the villages of Taishō and Kawanishi merged with Obihiro, bringing it to its current size.

=== Historical timeline ===
1883: Benzō Yoda and his "Banseisha" pioneers arrive in Opereperekepu.
1886: The Banseisha constructs the first road and two bridges.
1892: Obihiro's first post office is built.
1905: The Obihiro-Kushiro railway is completed.
1914: First electric lights installed.
1932: Midorigaoka Airport completed.
1933: Obihiro becomes a municipality. Moriharu Watanabe is the first mayor.
1945: Air-raid on Obihiro during World War II.
1949: Obihiro University of Agriculture and Veterinary Medicine constructed.
1954: Emperor Hirohito visits Obihiro.
1960: Ōtani Junior College is built.
1966: Obihiro Station is built.
1985: Obihiro no Mori speed skating rink constructed.
1991: Hokkaido Obihiro Museum of Art is built.
1993: Population reaches 170,000 people.
1996: Tokachi Ōhashi Bridge is completed.
2009: Indoor Speed Skating Facility Completed.

== Government ==
Obihiro has a mayor-council form of government with a directly elected mayor and a unicameral city council of 29 members. Obihiro, as part of Tokachi Subprefecture, contributes four members to the Hokkaidō Prefectural Assembly. In terms of national politics, the city is part of the Hokkaidō 11th district of the lower house of the Diet of Japan.

The city contains the headquarters of the Fifth Division of the Northern Army of the Japan Ground Self-Defense Force. It also hosts the Rally Japan World Rally Championship-event.

== Economy ==
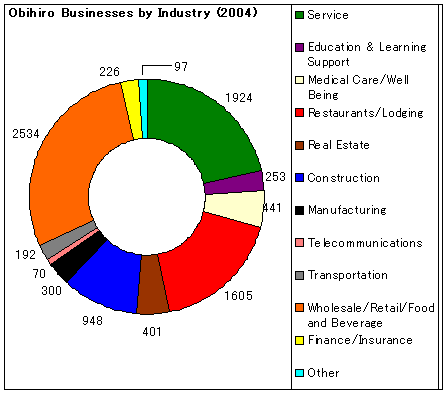
Obihiro's businesses broken down by industry

Obihiro, along with most of Tokachi, has a large agricultural sector that revolves around large scale farming operations. Farms within the boundaries of Obihiro have an average of approximately 24 hectares of arable land; exceeding the Hokkaido average (17.41 ha) and the national average (1.57 ha). The main crops produced are wheat, potatoes, beets, and beans, but there has also been progress in the production of nagaimo (Dioscorea polystachya) and gobō (Arctium lappa); two of Tokachi's specialty products. The headquarters of 3 nationally renowned pastry companies (Rokkatei, Ryugetsu, and Cranberry) are also located in Obihiro.

== Education ==
Obihiro has 25 public elementary schools and 13 public middle schools, and one combined elementary/junior high school operated by the city. The city has five public high schools and three special education schools for the handicapped operated by the Hokkaido Board of Education, and three private high schools. There is one national university, the Obihiro University of Agriculture and Veterinary Medicine located in the city. There are also eight vocational training schools.

== Transportation ==
=== Airport ===
- Tokachi-Obihiro Airport, located to the south of downtown Obihiro, but is still within the city's borders. It takes 50 minutes by car or 1 hour by bus from Obihiro Station to the airport.

=== Railways ===
JR Hokkaido - Nemuro Main Line

■ Nishi-Obihiro - Hakurindai - Obihiro

=== Highways ===
- Obihiro-Hiroo Expressway
- National Route 38
- National Route 236
- National Route 241

== Sister city relations ==
Obihiro has three international sister-cities:

- Seward, Alaska, United States - (1968)

While on a business trip in Alaska, a (former) teacher at Obihiro's Agricultural High School, Yasuhiko Ohzono, was asked by the mayor of Seward to create some sort of cultural exchange between the two cities. On March 21, 1967, the mayor of Obihiro sent a picture album and other materials to introduce the city to the mayor of Seward. The mayor of Seward sent a message, a coat of arms, and a medal; all of which were personally delivered by a member of the entourage of the U.S.-Japan Fishing Industry Negotiation Team in Japan at the time. Obihiro sends the Mayor of Seward a wooden carving of a bear. On January 31, 1968, the resolution made by the Seward City Council arrives. The City of Obihiro also created a resolution on March 27, 1968, the sister city agreement was signed by both sides, and exchange between the two cities began. Since the Obihiro Economic Observation Group visited Seward in September, 1971, there have been various exchanges between Seward and Obihiro. Both mayors and many citizens of both cities have participated in exchanges, and the high school student exchange program has been put on every year since the summer of 1973.

- Chaoyang, Liaoning, China - (2000)

Interaction between the two cities began with Chaoyang's Economic Observation Group Visit to Obihiro on May 30, 1985. In September that same year, Obihiro sent the 15 member Northeast China Friendship and Observation Group to Chaoyang. Since then various groups have made exchange visits, agricultural trainees have been received, and there has even been exchanges of craft projects between elementary students. Since 1987, administrative and agricultural trainees have made 13 visits. In addition, JICA (Japan International Cooperation Agency) has been sending agricultural specialists to Chaoyang. At the end of October in 1999, the mayor of Obihiro at the time, Toshifumi Sunagawa, lead the Official Friendship Visit Group to Chaoyang, and he exchanged memos regarding the signing of a Friendship City Agreement. On November 17, 2000, the mayor of Chaoyang at the time, Daicao Wang, lead a delegation to Obihiro where a Friendship City Agreement was signed with the purpose of deepening interaction between the two cities across a wide range of fields, and to promote further friendship and peace between the two cities; not to mention China and Japan. The two cities have run a high school student exchange program since 2002.

- Madison, Wisconsin, United States - (2006)

Obihiro became sister cities with Madison in October 2006. The two cities have almost the same latitude, and have similar climates. The content of the sister-city relationship has been mainly various visits to Madison regarding the field of mental health, but since the official start of the relationship there have been various fact-finding missions to and from Madison. There was even a short visit to Obihiro by two Madison area students, in August 2007. Obihiro hopes to learn more about Madison agriculture, mental health systems and facilities, and about how the University of Wisconsin–Madison runs various programs and organizations that have helped make it the university it is today. For example, the Obihiro University of Agriculture and Veterinary Medicine has shown interest in marketing ice cream and other dairy products as the Babcock Dairy does at UW–Madison.

== Local attractions ==
=== Ban'ei horse racing ===
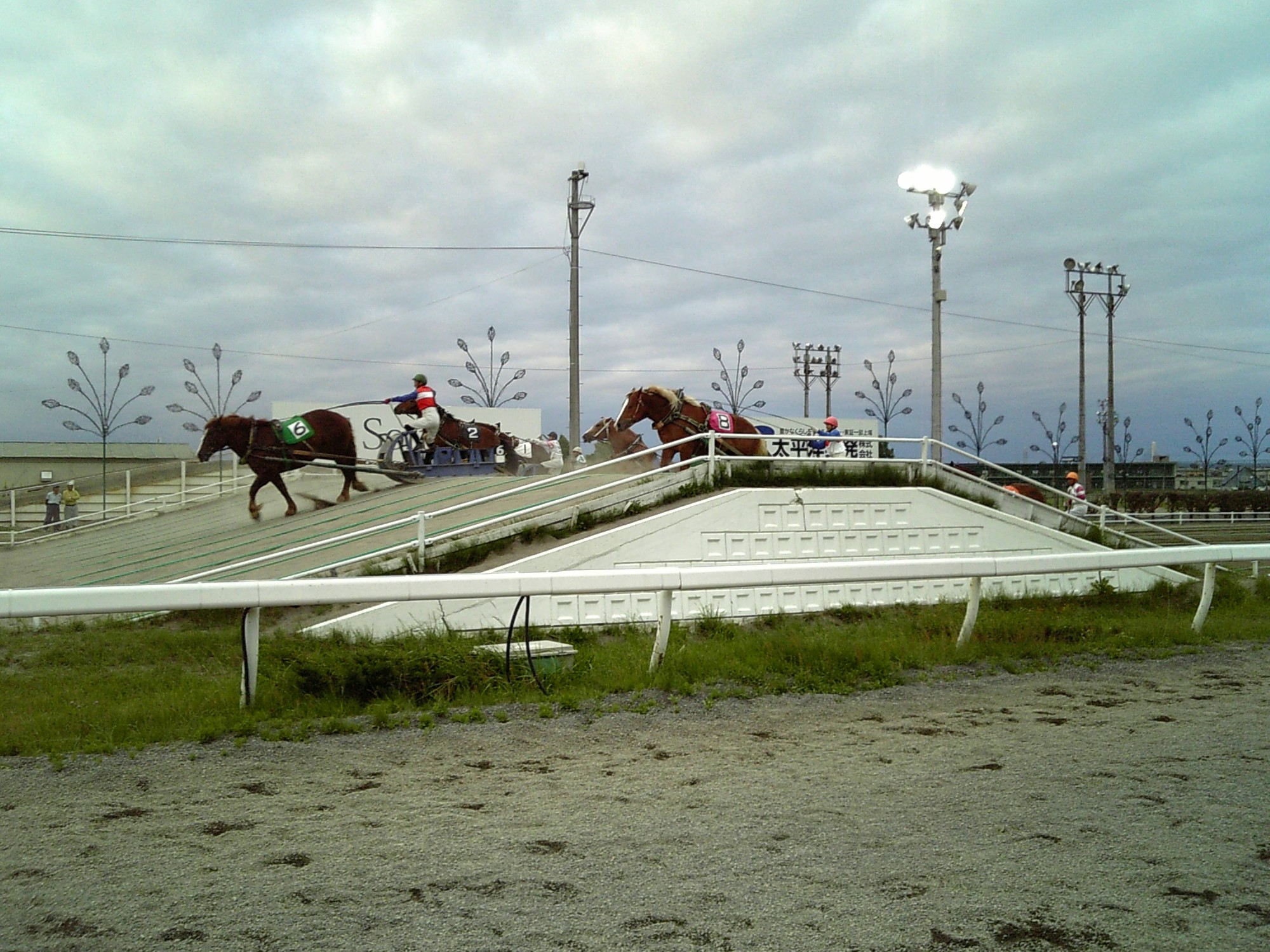
Ban'ei horses at Obihiro Racecourse

Obihiro is famous for the unique style of horse racing that takes place at the city's horse racetrack. Hokkaido farmers in the 1900s had tug-of-war contests between their work horses to judge their strength and value. This gradually became a more formalized event and eventually became the racing we know today as Ban'ei horse racing. Rather than an oblong track, which most people think of when talking about horse racing, Obihiro's ban'ei track is a straight 200 m run with two hills. Large and powerful draft horses pull sleds that can weigh more than a ton while their rider whips them hard to make them go faster. The track and facilities were renovated in 2007 due to major efforts by the city government to increase the popularity of the races. One unique aspect of the track is that spectators can walk alongside the track as the horses struggle towards the finish line. Starting in 2006, the City of Obihiro has poured money into reviving this sport and considers it a part of the city's traditional culture.

=== Major festivals ===
Obihiro has three major festivals: the Flat Plain Festival, the Chrysanthemum Festival, and the Ice Festival.

The Flat Plain Festival (平原まつり, heigen matsuri)

Passing its 60th year in 2007, this festival spans 3 days in mid August during Obihiro's O-bon holiday season. The festival takes place on the downtown streets of Obihiro and includes a taiko drum performance that spans multiple city blocks with teams from all over Hokkaido, an energetic night-time parade called Yume Furu Ya (夢降夜, "The night of raining dreams") which expresses hopes for a good harvest, and a 2 hour long O-bon dance that includes an open section for anyone to jump in and dance along with all the other groups who are competing for first prize.

The Chrysanthemum Festival (菊まつり, kiku matsuri)

Held every year around the end of October, this 6 day festival celebrates an important flower in the Japanese culture. This festival features thousands of chrysanthemums on display in Obihiro's Central Park (中央公園). In 2007, the festival were held from October 30 to November 4.

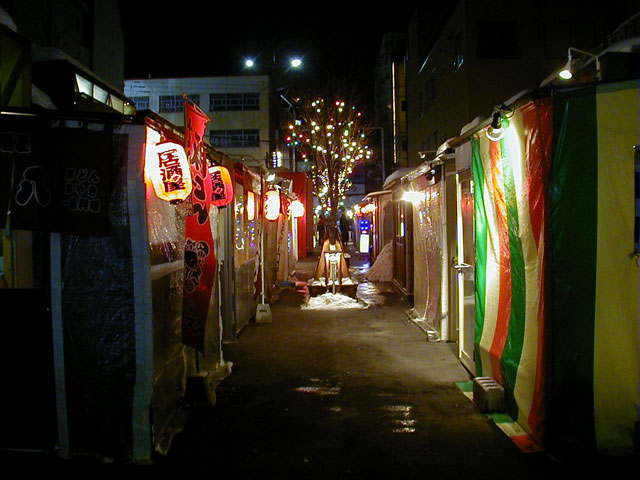
Kita no Yatai in Obihiro

The Ice Festival (氷まつり, kōri matsuri)

The cold weather and ice-caked roads of Obihiro can make it hard for people to go out and have fun in the winter, but this festival provides the residents of Obihiro and all of Tokachi to get out and enjoy the white snow of the season. There are fireworks and foodstands, and a pathway lined with various snow and ice sculptures. Some of the sculptures are of funny characters such as Anpanman, but other sculptures can depict fantastic mythical figures.

=== Kita no Yatai ===
The Kita no Yatai (北の屋台) is an alleyway of unique foodstands that is open all year-round, and offers foods from many different countries.

=== Food ===
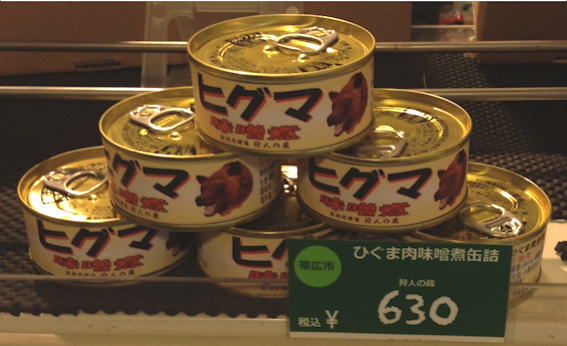
Tinned wild bear meat, sold in Tokachi Mura, a shop in Obihiro, Hokkaido, Japan, May 2013

Obihiro is famous for pork meat glazed in a special sauce on rice, which is called butadon and mutton, which is called jingisukan, named after Genghis Khan. It is also famous for potatoes and dairy products, which are common produce in Tokachi. Obihiro also claims to be the origin of a dish called chuuka chirashi. It is also known for its high quality turnips. Wild game, including venison and bear meat, is also eaten in Obihiro.

== Sightseeing ==
- Kōfuku Station, a closed station which remains a popular sightseeing attraction due its name meaning "happiness".

== Major city facilities ==
=== Tokachi International Relations Center ===
The Tokachi International Relations Center (森の交流館・十勝, TIRC) was opened in 1996. It was created to facilitate international studies and events, academic study, and general interaction between people of different cultures and backgrounds. The establishment of the TIRC influenced the Japan International Cooperation Agency (JICA) in its decision to build the adjacent JICA Obihiro facility. Many events are now coordinated between the various organizations represented in buildings.

The TIRC offers a library room, an all-purpose gymnasium, kitchen facilities, and a large indoor "winter garden" of indoor flora. Two major events held here each year are the "Friends of the World Cookout", where over 2,000 people gather to cook and eat international food, and the "Mori no Halloween" party where over 1,000 costumed parents and children celebrate a holiday that is not native to Japan.

=== JICA Obihiro International Centre ===
Tokachi International Relations Center

JICA Obihiro (Japan International Cooperation Agency/Obihiro International Centre) was established in April 1996 as a center for international cooperation activities in eastern Hokkaido. JICA carries out a variety of programmes in connection with technical cooperation with developing countries. In all, there are three organizations housed in the International Centre; Japan International Cooperation Agency, Japan International Cooperation Center, and the Northern Regions Center.

=== Obihiro Zoo ===
Obihiro Zoo (おびひろ動物園) opened in 1963. Construction of a new monkey facility was completed in June 2008. It cost approximately 266 million yen (US$2.66 million)

=== Obihiro Library ===
The new Obihiro public library was opened in 2006, and currently has over 300 English language books available.

=== Indoor ice-skating rink ===
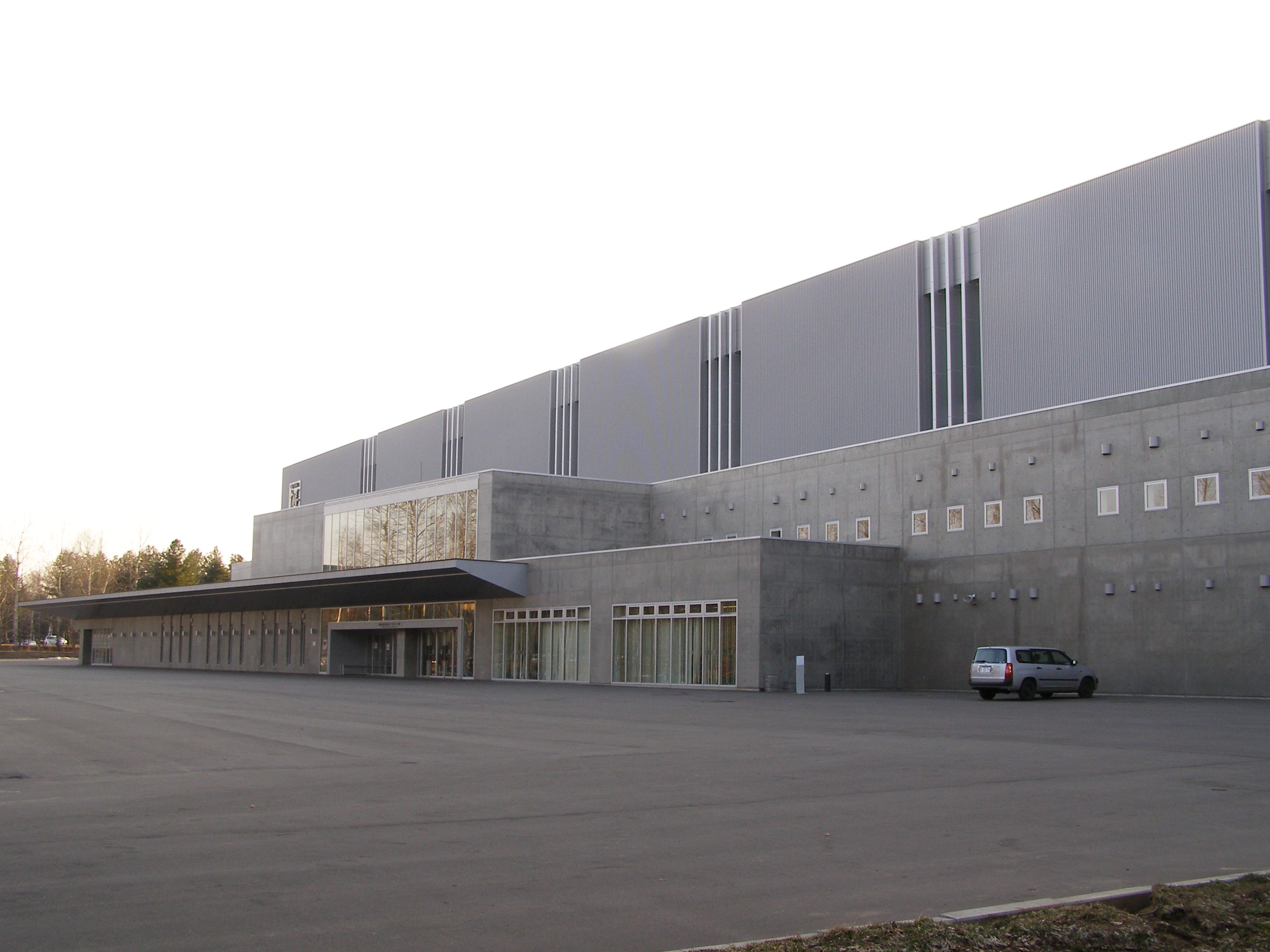
Meiji Hokkaido-Tokachi Oval

An Olympic sized indoor speed skating rink, Meiji Hokkaido-Tokachi Oval, has been completed on the west side of Obihiro. Its construction was controversial due to its large price tag. The tentative budget for the project was the equivalent of US$30 million. It was the site for the Essent ISU World Sprint Speed Skating Championships 2010.

== Events ==
Parts of the 2017 Asian Winter Games are hosted in Obihiro.

== Mascot ==
Shirakanba, the city's mascot

Obihiro's mascot is Shirakanba (しらかんば), who is a wooden horse that resembled a birch tree. However, unlike horses, its gender is unknown. It likes to farm on sunny days. As result, it is skilled at anything related to agriculture. It was unveiled on 25 January 2021.

== Notable people from Obihiro ==
- Tomo Furukawa (singer and artist)
- Fumiko Nakajō (poet)
- Kitakachidoki Hayato (sumo wrestler)
- Manami Hino (Olympic Bobsledder)
- Jun Kasai (professional wrestler)
- Yoshitsugu Matsuoka (Voice Actor)
- Maya Sakura (Enka singer)
- Hiroyasu Shimizu (Olympic Speedskater)
- Misato Yokoyama (Classical pianist)
- Kana Ichinose (Voice Actress)
