= Yoda Benzō =

- 依田 勉三
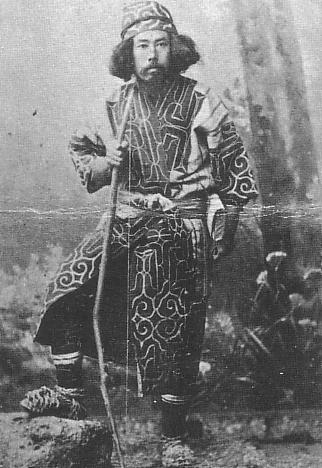

Personal details
- Born: June 21, 1853 Ōsawa, Izu Province, Japan
- Died: December 12, 1925 (aged 72) Obihiro, Hokkaidō, Japan

Yoda Benzō (Japanese: 依田 勉三; 1853–1925) was a Japanese farmer, rancher, and pioneer of Hokkaidō. He is regarded as the founder of the city of Obihiro and industry on the Tokachi Plain.

== Biography ==
Yoda Benzō was born in Ōsawa village in Izu Province to Yoda Zen'emon (依田 善右衛門). The Yoda family were descended from retainers of the Takeda clan.

In 1881, Yoda travelled alone to Hokkaidō to survey land suitable for agriculture. The next year, he and his brothers established the Banseisha (晩成社), a company to recruit settlers for the development of Japan's northern frontier. In 1883, the Banseisha acquired land-use authorization and funds from the Kaitakushi. Over following decades Yoda attempted many enterprises to strengthen Obihiro's economy including sericulture, cultivating shiitake mushrooms, farming apples, azuki beans, and millet, as well as livestock farming of pigs, sheep, and cattle.

Throughout the 1880s, the Banseisha's crops suffered from extreme cold, locusts, and the frequent flooding of the Tokachi River. In the 1890s, conditions began to improve and in 1902 Yoda established a butter factory. Despite its importance during the settling of Obihiro, the Banseisha declined in the early 20th century due to financial mismanagement and eventually went bankrupt. In 1916 the Banseisha sold its remaining assets and ceased to exist.

Yoda died in 1925.
