= Memuro Station =

Railway station in Memuro, Hokkaido, Japan

K27 Memuro Station 芽室駅
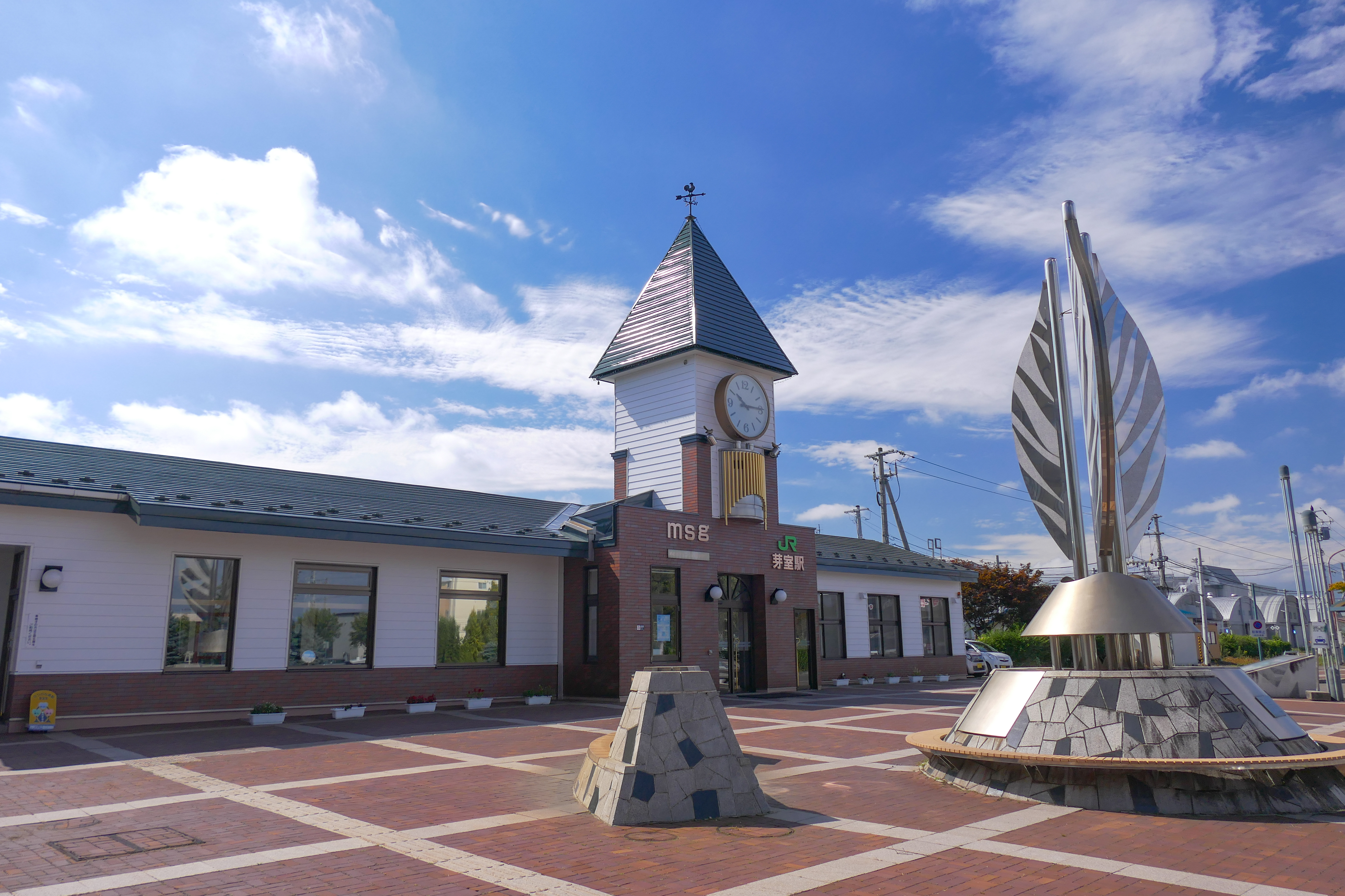
- Station building in September 2021

General information
- Location: 1 Chome Hondori, Memuro, Kasai District, Hokkaido 082-0030; Japan
- Coordinates: 42°54′36.08″N 143°2′54.01″E
- System: regional rail
- Operator: JR Hokkaido
- Line: Nemuro Main Line
- Distance: 30.2km from Shintoku
- Platforms: 1 side + 1 island platform
- Tracks: 3

Construction
- Structure type: At-grade
- Accessible: No

Other information
- Status: Staffed (Midori no Madoguchi)
- Station code: K27
- Website: Official website

History
- Opened: 8 September 1907; 119 years ago

Passengers
- FY2019: 277 daily

Services
| Preceding station | JR Hokkaido | Following station |
|---|---|---|
| Mikage towards Takikawa | Nemuro Main Line Local | Taisei towards Nemuro |
Location
- Location within Hokkaido Location within Japan

Memuro Station (芽室駅, Memuro-eki) is a railway station located in the town of Memuro, Kasai District, Hokkaidō, It is operated by JR Hokkaido.

== Lines ==
The station is served by the Nemuro Main Line, and lies 30.2 km from the starting point of the line at Shintoku.

== Layout ==
Memuro Station has one side platform and one island platform connected by a footbridge. Platform 1, located on the station building side, is the main line, used by all express trains and most local trains. Platforms 2 and 3 are used for passing trains and for local trains between Obihiro and this station. The two platforms are connected by an overpass. The station building underwent extensive renovations in 1999, including the installation of a mechanical clock in front of the station. It has a Midori no Madoguchi staffed ticket office.

=== Platforms ===
| 1 | ■ Nemuro Main Line | for Shintoku and Sapporo |
| 2 | ■ Nemuro Main Line | for Obihiro |

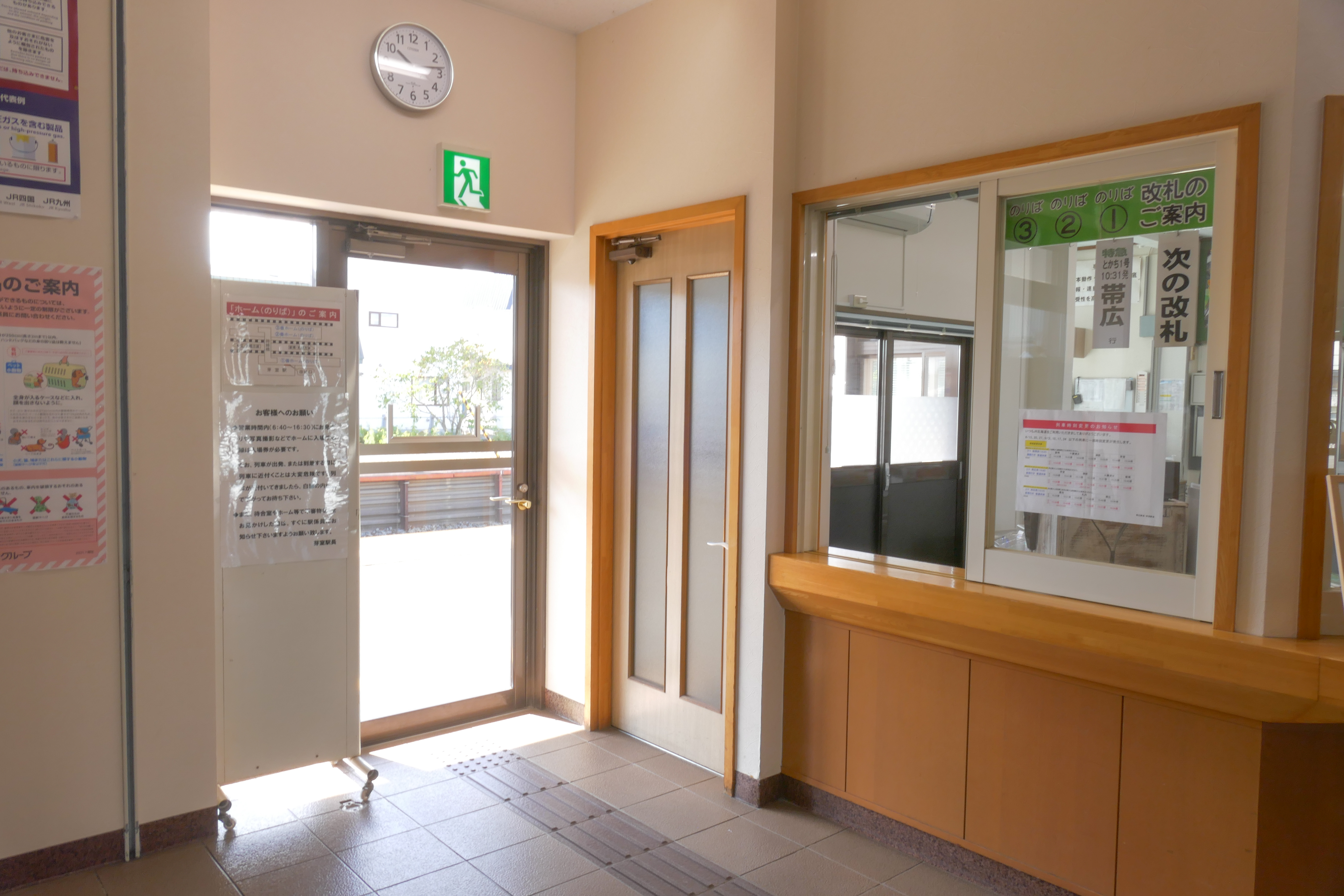
Ticket office

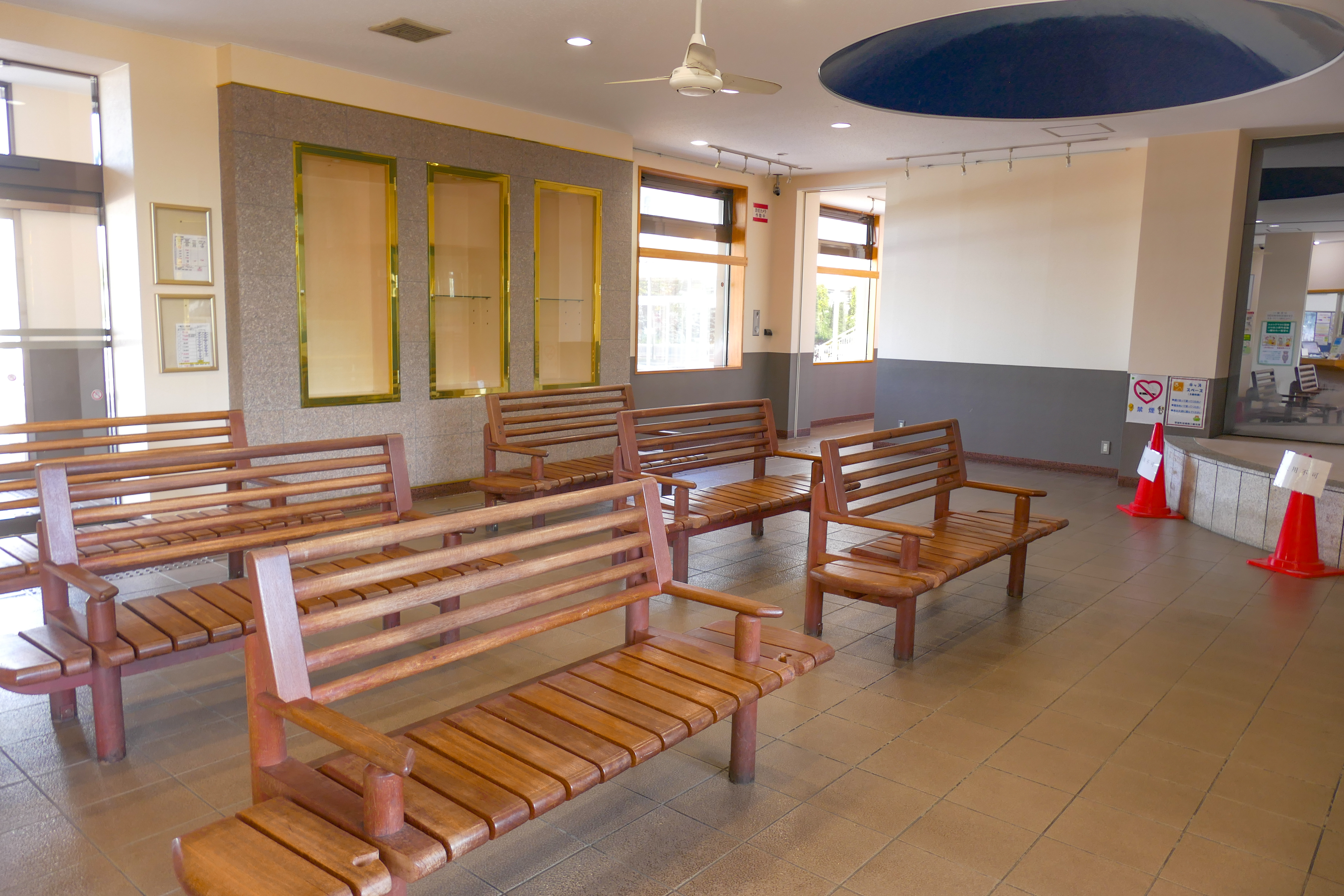
Waiting room

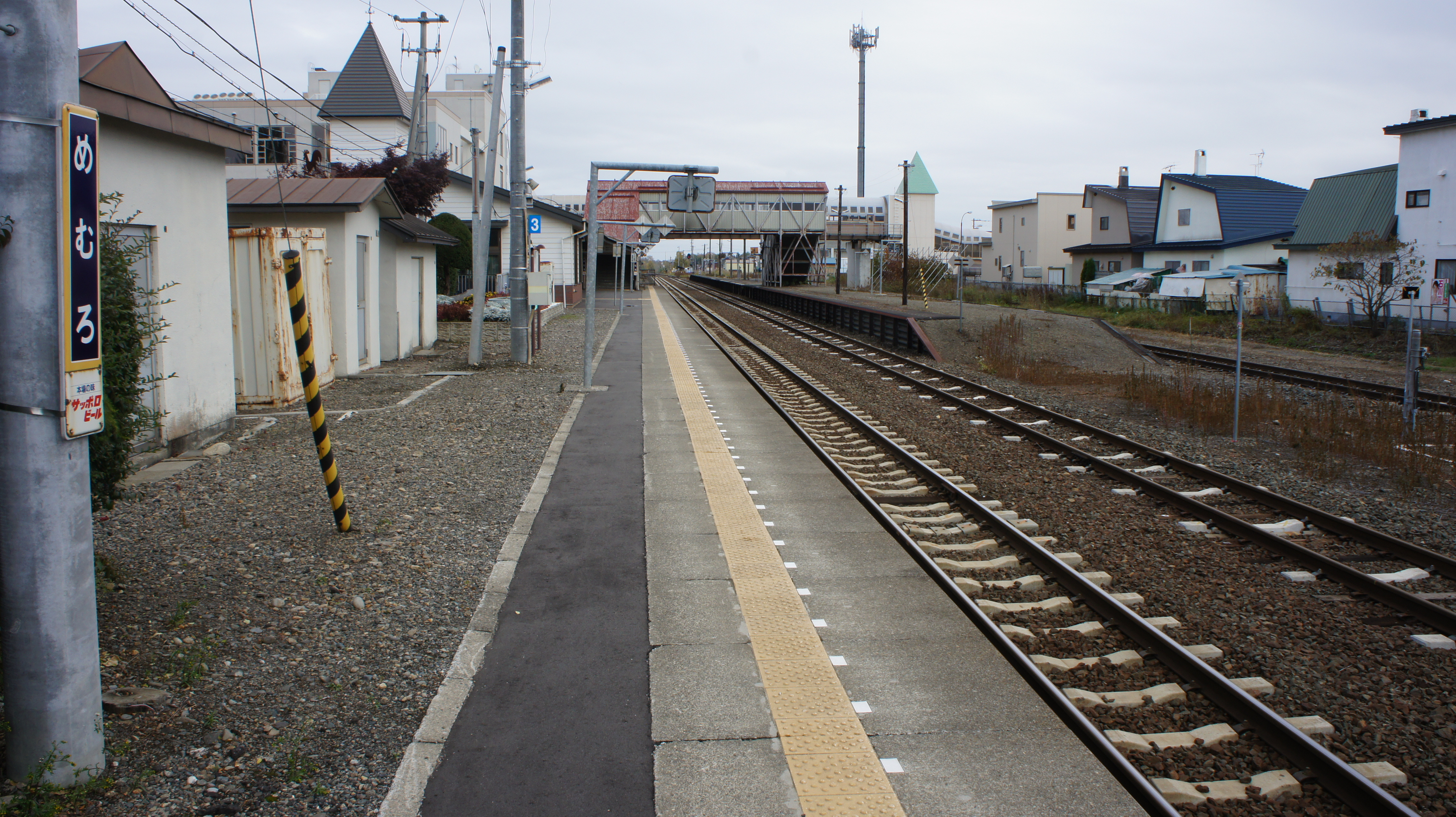
Platforms

== History ==
Memuro Station opened on 8 September 1907 as a station on the Japanese Government Railways. With the privatization of the Japan National Railway (JNR) on 1 April 1987, the station came under the aegis of the Hokkaido Railway Company (JR Hokkaido).

== Passenger statistics ==
In fiscal 2019, the station was used by an average of 277 passengers daily.

== Surrounding area ==
- Hokkaido Prefectural Highway 420 Memuro Station Line
- Hokkaido Prefectural Highway 62 Toyokoro-Nukanai-Memuro Line
- Memuro Town Hall

== See also ==
- List of railway stations in Japan
