= Obihiro Station =

Railway station in Obihiro, Hokkaido, Japan

Obihiro Station 帯広駅
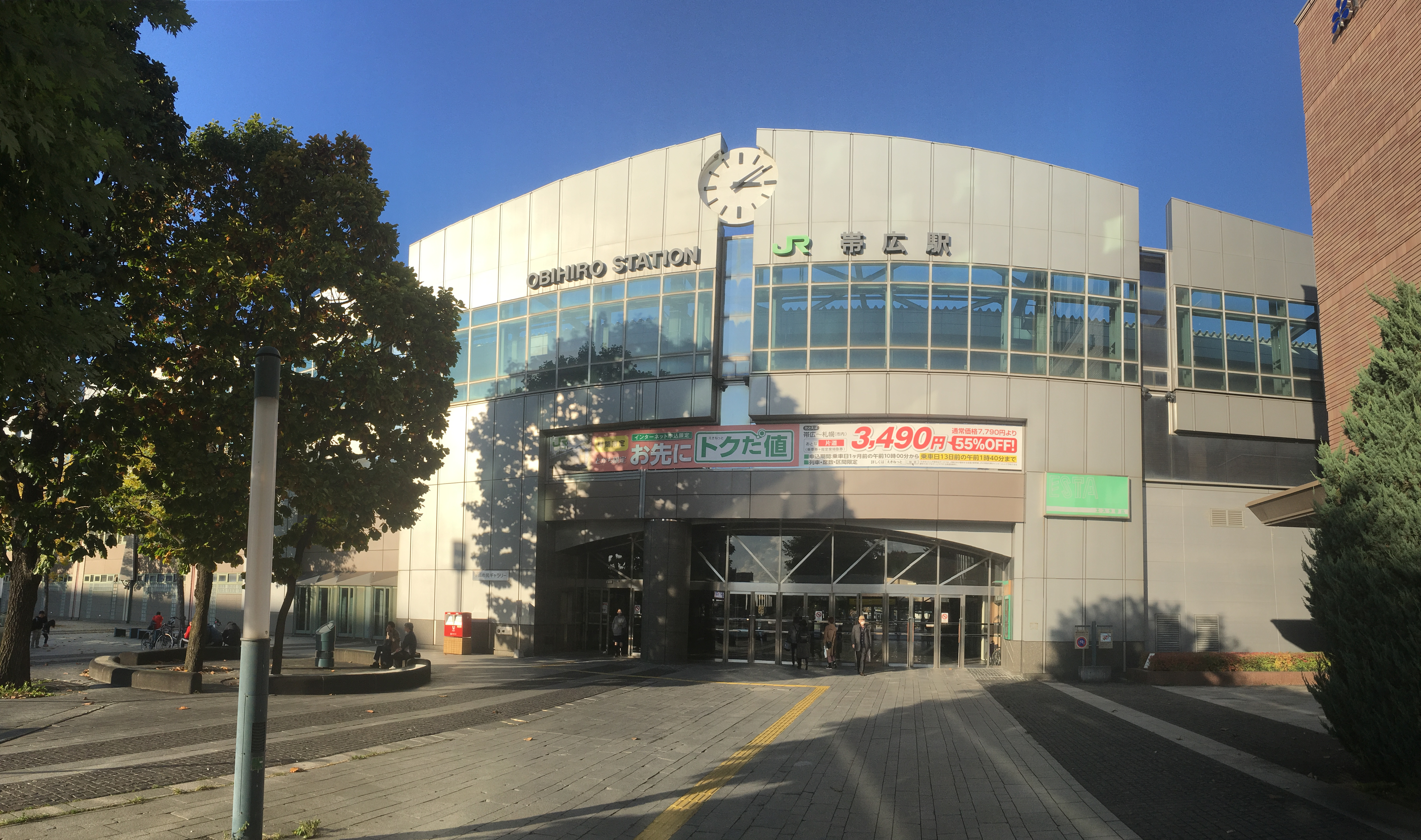

General information
- Location: Obihiro, Hokkaido; Japan
- Coordinates: 42.918006°N 143.202072°E
- Operator: JR Hokkaido
- Lines: ■ Nemuro Main Line; Hiroo Line (closed); Shihoro Line (closed)
- Distance: 180.1 km from Takikawa
- Platforms: 2 Island platforms
- Tracks: 4

Construction
- Structure type: Elevated
- Accessible: Yes

Other information
- Status: Staffed
- Station code: K31
- Website: Official website

History
- Opened: 21 October 1905; 120 years ago

Passengers
- FY2014: 1,924 daily
Location

Obihiro Station (帯広駅, Obihiro-eki) is the main railway station in the city of Obihiro in Hokkaido, Japan. It is located on the Nemuro Main Line and is managed by Hokkaido Railway Company (JR Hokkaido). Originally built in 1905, the station was rebuilt in 1996, but part of the original tracks that ran past the old Obihiro Station can still be seen on the north side of the station.

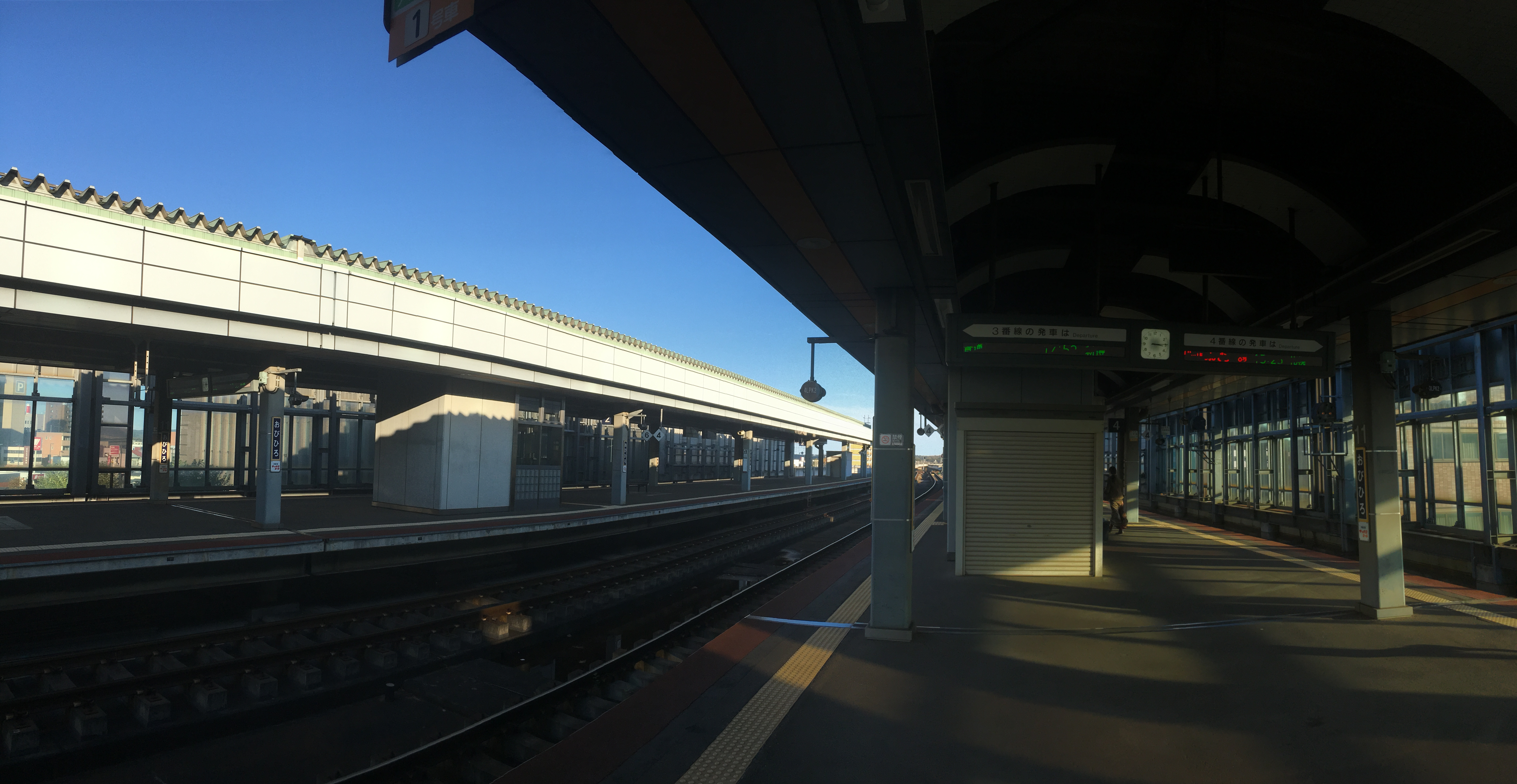
Platforms, 2020

== Lines ==
Obihiro Station is served by the Nemuro Main Line, and is situated 180.1 km from the starting point of the line at Takikawa Station. The station is numbered "K31".

== Limited express services ==
Obihiro Station is served by the following Limited express services.

- Ōzora (Sapporo - Kushiro)
- Tokachi (Sapporo - Obihiro)

The fastest journey time between Sapporo and Obihiro is approximately 2 hours and 25 minutes by the Ōzora.

== Station layout ==
The station consists of two elevated island platforms serving four tracks. Platforms 1/2 and 3/4 are not connected, and are accessed separately from opposing sets of ticket gates.

== Facilities ==
The station has a "Midori no Madoguchi" staffed ticket office and also a Twinkle Plaza travel agency. The Kitaca farecard cannot be used at this station.

== History ==
Obihiro Station opened on 21 October 1905.

The station once served as the terminus of the Hiroo Line and the Shihiro Line. Both of these lines closed for service in February and March 1987 respectively owing to the JNR reconstruction act.

With the privatization of JNR on 1 April 1987, the station came under the control of JR Hokkaido.

== Adjacent stations ==
«	Service	»
Nemuro Main Line
Shintoku (K23) or Memuro (K27)	Limited Express Ōzora	Ikeda (K36)
Memuro (K27)	Limited Express Tokachi	Terminus
Hakurindai (K30)	Local	Satsunai (K32)
