= Taiki Station =

Abandoned railway station in Japan

Taiki Station is an abandoned railway station on the Japanese National Railways Hiroo Line in Taiki, Hiroo District, Hokkaido.

== History ==
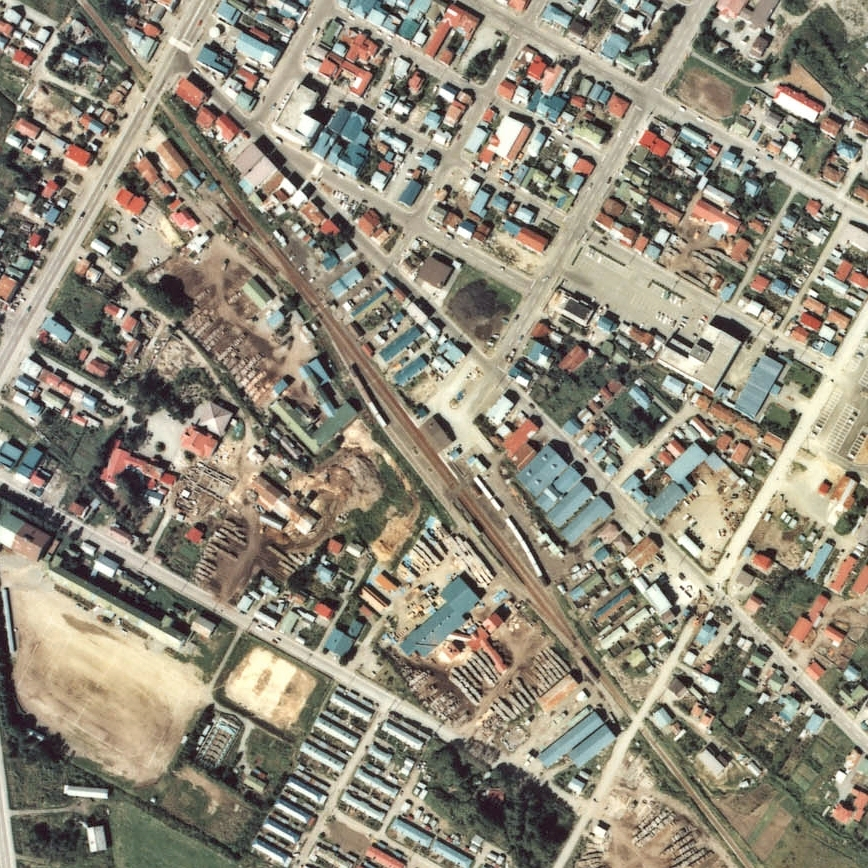
Aerial photograph of the station area in 1977

The station opened on October 10, 1930, as a terminal station upon the extension of the Hiroo Line from Nakasatsunai to Taiki. The line was further extended to the port city of Hiroo in 1932.

The station had freight service until September 10, 1982, and baggage service until February 1, 1984.

The station was closed upon the closure of the Hiroo Line on February 2, 1987.

== Layout ==
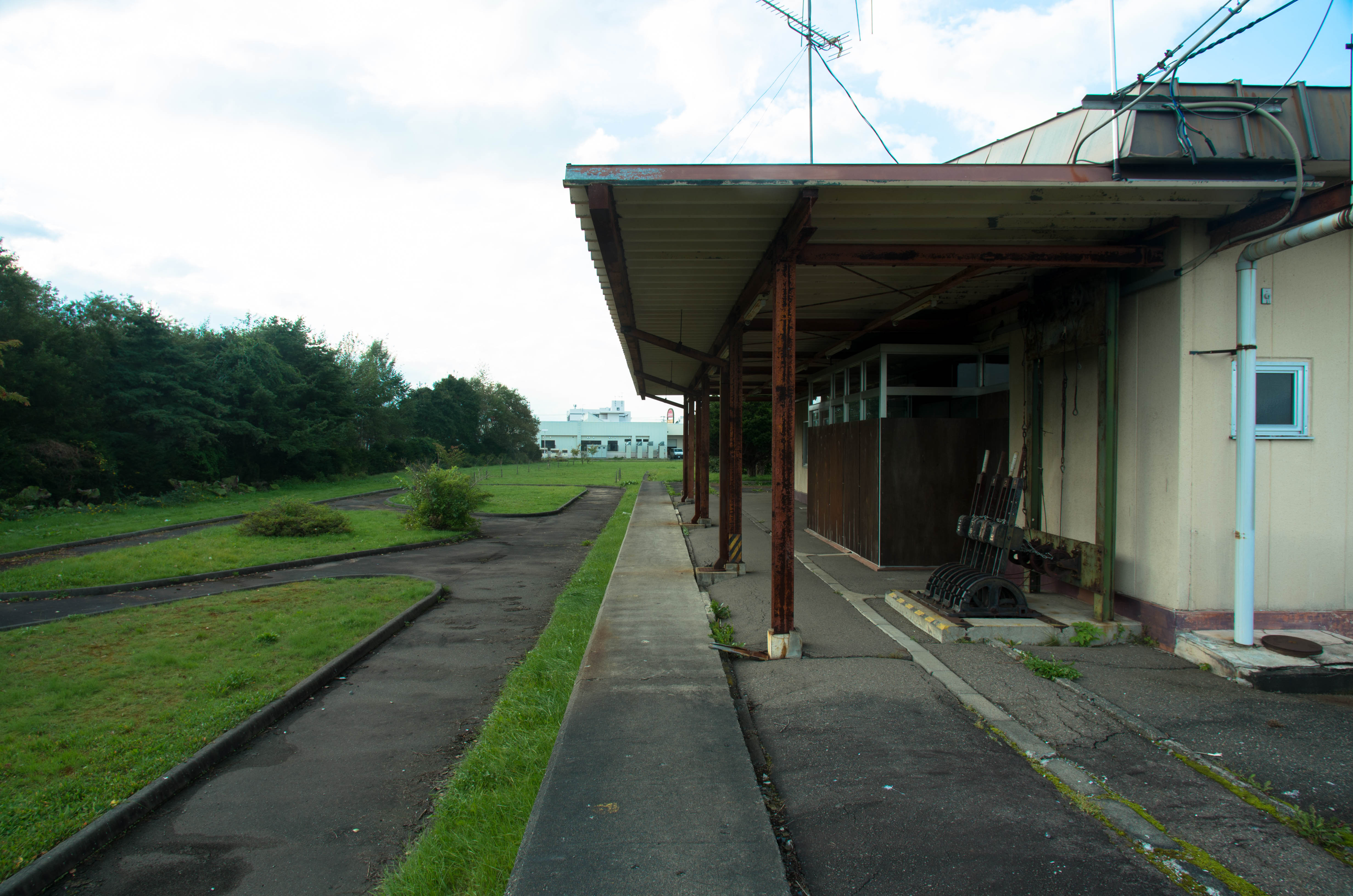
Platform and track area

As of its closure, Taiki had two platforms and two lines, and served as an interchange station for train meets. The platforms were connected by a level crossing inside the station. The platform by the station building (Track 1) was used for Hiroo-bound trains, while the island platform opposite the station building (Track 2) was used for Obihiro-bound trains.

== Usage ==
In fiscal year 1981, the station had an average daily passenger count of 204.

== Later uses ==
The abandoned station building was re-purposed as a ticketing office and waiting room for Tokachi Bus, and was staffed by Tokachi Bus through 2002. Thereafter, Tokachi Bus relocated its stop to the nearby Michi no Eki Cosmall facility, and Hokkaido Satellite used the building as its headquarters starting in 2005.

The station grounds were used as a park after the closure of the station, with a two-car passenger train and two-car freight train on display until their removal around the summer of 2000.

The rails were also removed at this time.

The former rail bridge crossing the Rekifune River to the station was maintained as a pedestrian bridge until the early 2000s, but was demolished by 2010.
