= E60 =

E60 or E 60 may refer to:

== Transportation ==
- European route E60, a highway running from France to Kyrgyzstan
- BMW E60, a 2003–2010 platform number for the BMW 5 Series luxury German sedans
- GE E60, an American boxcab electric locomotive
- Mercedes-Benz E-60 AMG, in the Mercedes-Benz W124 series
- New Flyer E60, a high-floor trolleybus
- Obihiro-Hiroo Expressway, route E60 in Japan

== Other uses ==
- Nokia E60, a mobile phone
- E:60, a sports television program on ESPN
- Electronika 60, a computer
- King's Indian Defence (Encyclopaedia of Chess Openings code)
