= Sarabetsu, Hokkaido =

Town in Japan

Sarabetsu 更別村 Sarabetsu-mura
- Village
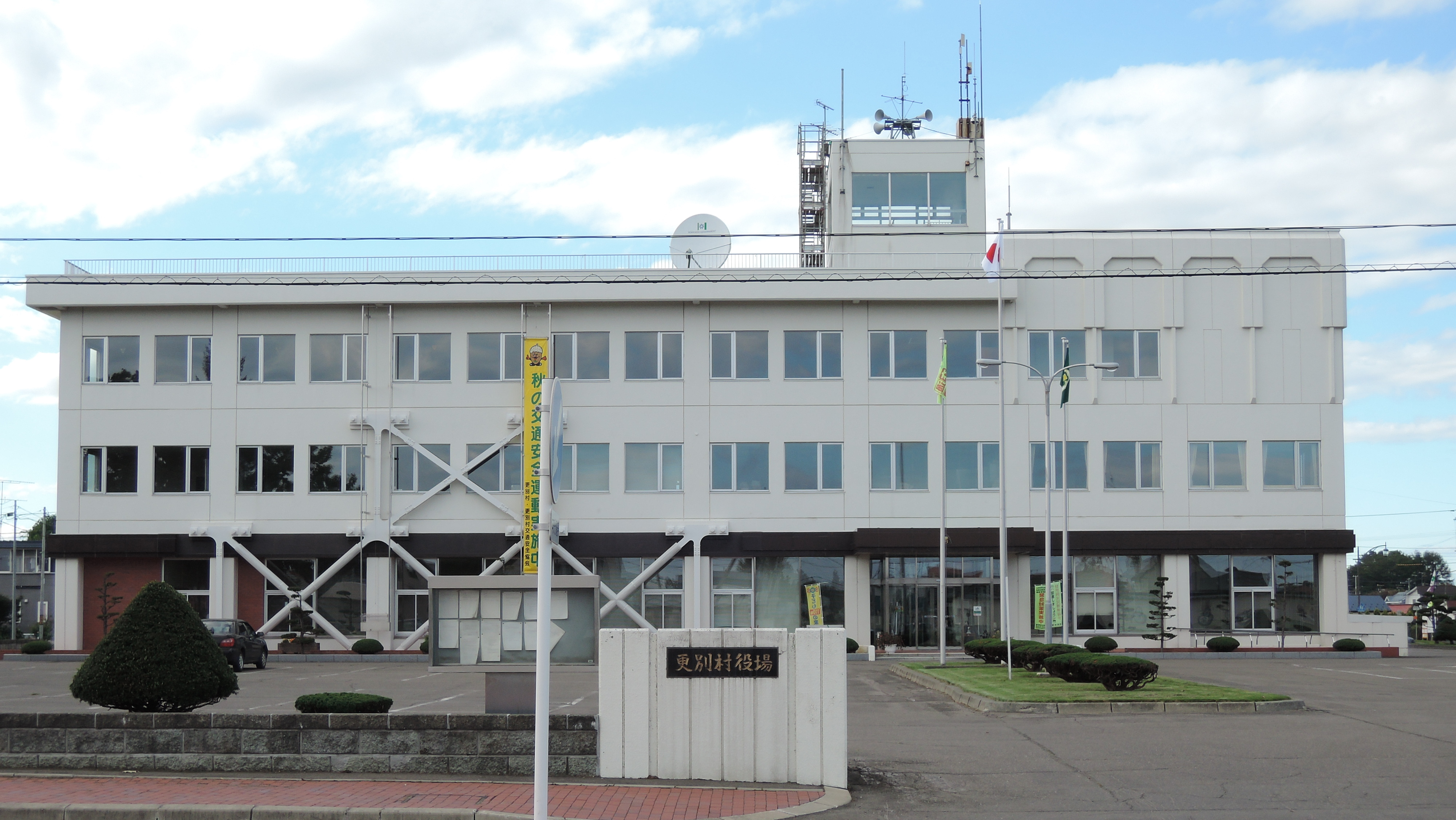
- Sarabetsu Village hall

- Flag Emblem

- Location of Sarabetsu in Hokkaido (Tokachi Subprefecture)
- Interactive map of Sarabetsu
- Coordinates: 42°39′02″N 143°11′16″E
- Country: Japan
- Region: Hokkaido
- Prefecture: Hokkaido (Tokachi Subprefecture)
- District: Kasai

Area
  - Total: 176.90 km^{2} (68.30 sq mi)

Population (November 1, 2025)
  - Total: 3,051
  - Density: 17.25/km^{2} (44.67/sq mi)
- Time zone: UTC+09:00 (JST)
- City hall address: 93 Sarabetsu Minami 1 Line, Sarabetsu Village, Kasai District, Hokkaido 〒089-1595
- Climate: Dfb
- Website: www.sarabetsu.jp
- Symbols
- Flower: Lily of the valley
- Tree: Daimyo Oak

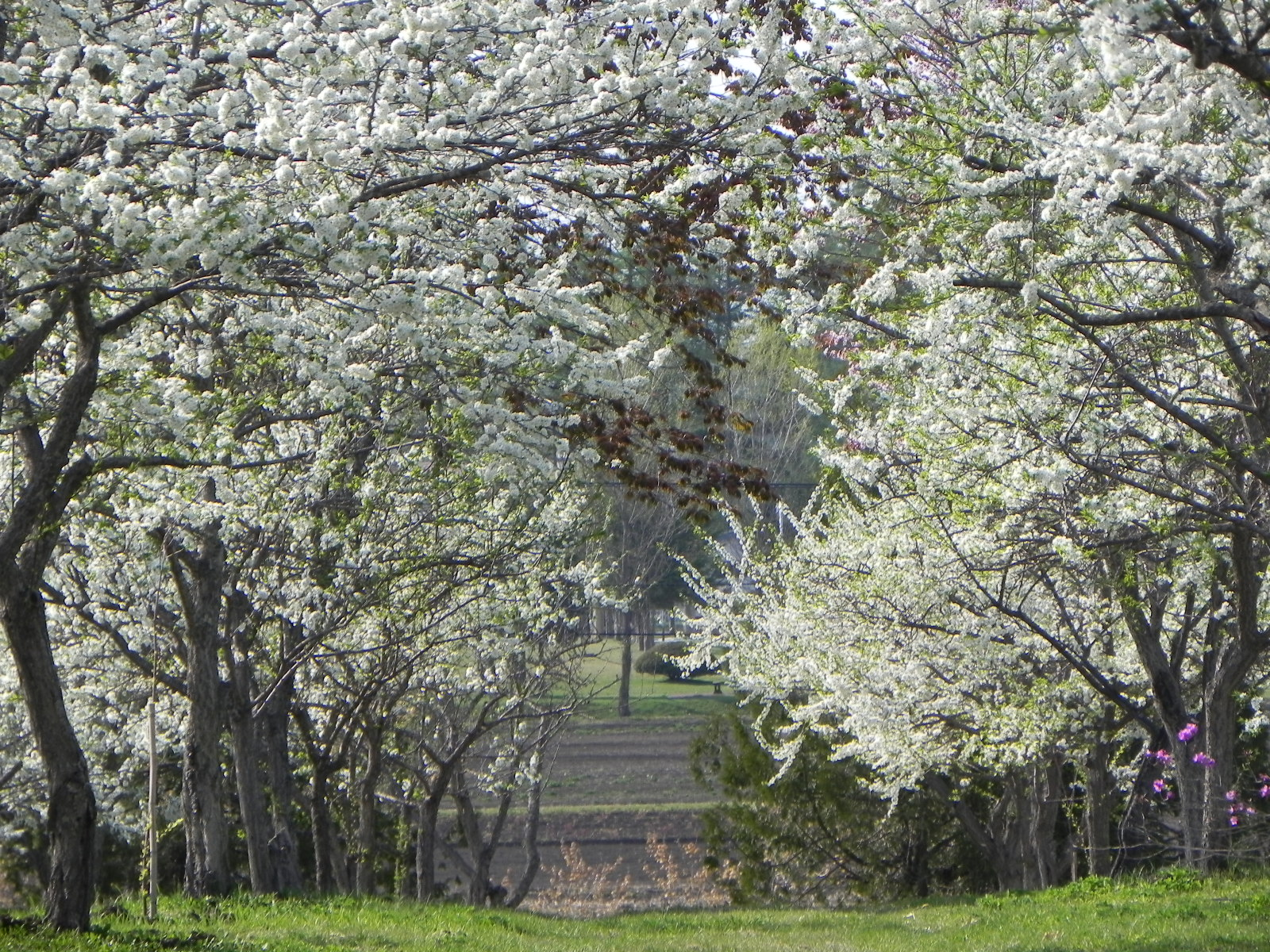
Plum groves in Sarabetsu

Sarabetsu (更別村, Sarabetsu-mura) is a village located in Tokachi Subprefecture, Hokkaidō, Japan. As of 1 November 2025, the village had an estimated population of 3,051 in 1364 households, and a population density of 17 people per km^{2}. The total area of the town is 176.90 km^{2} (68.30 sq mi).

== Geography ==
Sarabetsu is located in southern Hokkaido in the southern end of Tokachi Subprefecture. It is located on an alluvial fan extending east of the Hidaka Mountains, and most of the village area is a gently sloping plateau covered with volcanic ash. Most of the village area is used for farmland. The Sarabetsu River, Sachcharubetsu River, and Sachcharobetsu River flow from southwest to northeast through the village, merging with the Sarubetsu River at the northeastern edge of the village.

=== Neighboring municipalities ===
- Obihiro
- Makubetsu
- Taiki
- Nakasatsunai

=== Climate ===
According to the Köppen climate classification, Sarabetsu has a humid continental climate. It has large temperature differences, including large annual and daily temperature ranges. It receives a lot of snow, and is designated as a heavy snow area. In winter, temperatures below -20°C are not uncommon, making it extremely cold.

== Climate ==
Climate data for Sarabetsu (1991−2020 normals, extremes 1977−present)
Month	Jan	Feb	Mar	Apr	May	Jun	Jul	Aug	Sep	Oct	Nov	Dec	Year
Record high °C (°F)	7.6 (45.7)	10.9 (51.6)	15.7 (60.3)	29.6 (85.3)	38.0 (100.4)	34.9 (94.8)	36.2 (97.2)	37.1 (98.8)	34.2 (93.6)	27.5 (81.5)	21.3 (70.3)	14.0 (57.2)	38.0 (100.4)
Mean daily maximum °C (°F)	−2.7 (27.1)	−1.7 (28.9)	2.9 (37.2)	10.3 (50.5)	16.5 (61.7)	19.4 (66.9)	22.7 (72.9)	24.0 (75.2)	20.8 (69.4)	15.0 (59.0)	7.5 (45.5)	−0.1 (31.8)	11.2 (52.2)
Daily mean °C (°F)	−8.7 (16.3)	−7.7 (18.1)	−2.2 (28.0)	4.7 (40.5)	10.6 (51.1)	14.1 (57.4)	17.8 (64.0)	19.1 (66.4)	15.8 (60.4)	9.3 (48.7)	2.4 (36.3)	−5.5 (22.1)	5.8 (42.4)
Mean daily minimum °C (°F)	−15.4 (4.3)	−15.0 (5.0)	−8.4 (16.9)	−0.6 (30.9)	5.0 (41.0)	9.6 (49.3)	14.0 (57.2)	15.4 (59.7)	11.4 (52.5)	4.1 (39.4)	−2.7 (27.1)	−11.5 (11.3)	0.5 (32.9)
Record low °C (°F)	−26.9 (−16.4)	−29.0 (−20.2)	−25.8 (−14.4)	−13.0 (8.6)	−4.4 (24.1)	0.6 (33.1)	6.0 (42.8)	6.8 (44.2)	0.5 (32.9)	−5.7 (21.7)	−15.4 (4.3)	−22.7 (−8.9)	−29.0 (−20.2)
Average precipitation mm (inches)	56.9 (2.24)	42.4 (1.67)	58.8 (2.31)	71.6 (2.82)	95.8 (3.77)	96.0 (3.78)	119.7 (4.71)	157.3 (6.19)	179.5 (7.07)	118.4 (4.66)	76.8 (3.02)	67.5 (2.66)	1,137.9 (44.80)
Average precipitation days (≥ 1.0 mm)	6.9	5.9	8.0	8.2	8.7	8.8	9.7	10.9	10.8	8.9	8.6	7.5	102.9
Mean monthly sunshine hours	147.9	149.2	186.6	186.4	176.0	140.7	120.6	123.4	138.5	168.4	155.8	135.5	1,828.6
Source: JMA

=== Demographics ===
Per Japanese census data, the population of Sarabetsu has remained relatively constant in recent decades.

Historical population
Year	Pop.	±%
1970	4,324	—
1980	3,624	−16.2%
1990	3,433	−5.3%
2000	3,291	−4.1%
2010	3,393	+3.1%
2020	3,080	−9.2%

== History ==
In 1890, nine families, from Totsukawa Village, Yoshino District, Nara Prefecture, moved to this area. This marked the beginning of Japanese settlement in the area. At the time, the area was covered with oak trees. Originally, the area belonged to Makubetsu Village. However, at the request of local residents, it was incorporated into Taisho Village (now part of Obihiro) in April 1926. With the opening of the government-operated Hiroo Line in 1930, the area rapidly developed. In September 1947, the area was separated to form new village of Sarabetsu.

== Government ==
Sarabetsu has a mayor-council form of government with a directly elected mayor and a unicameral village council of eight members. Sarabetsu, as part of Tokachi Subprefecture, contributes four members to the Hokkaidō Prefectural Assembly. In terms of national politics, the village is part of the Hokkaidō 11th district of the lower house of the Diet of Japan.

== Economy ==
When settlement first began in the area, charcoal production and lumbering were the main industries. Later, agriculture, such as field crops and livestock farming, became popular. Field crops include wheat, sugar beets, potatoes, adzuki beans, and kidney beans. Livestock farming is thriving, with dairy cows and beef cattle being raised. The area is also known for its advanced agricultural management innovation. It has been an early promoter of efficient management through large-scale farming and mechanization, and is known for having the largest cultivated land area per farm household in Japan.

== Education ==
Sarabetsu has two public elementary schools and one public middle school operated by the town. The town has one public high school operated by the Hokkaido Board of Education.

== Transportation ==
=== Railways ===
Sarabetsu has not had passenger railway service since the discontinuation of the JR Hokkaido Hiroo Line in 1987. The nearest train station is Obihiro Station on the Nemuro Main Line.

=== Highways ===
- Obihiro-Hiroo Expressway
- National Route 236

== Local attractions ==
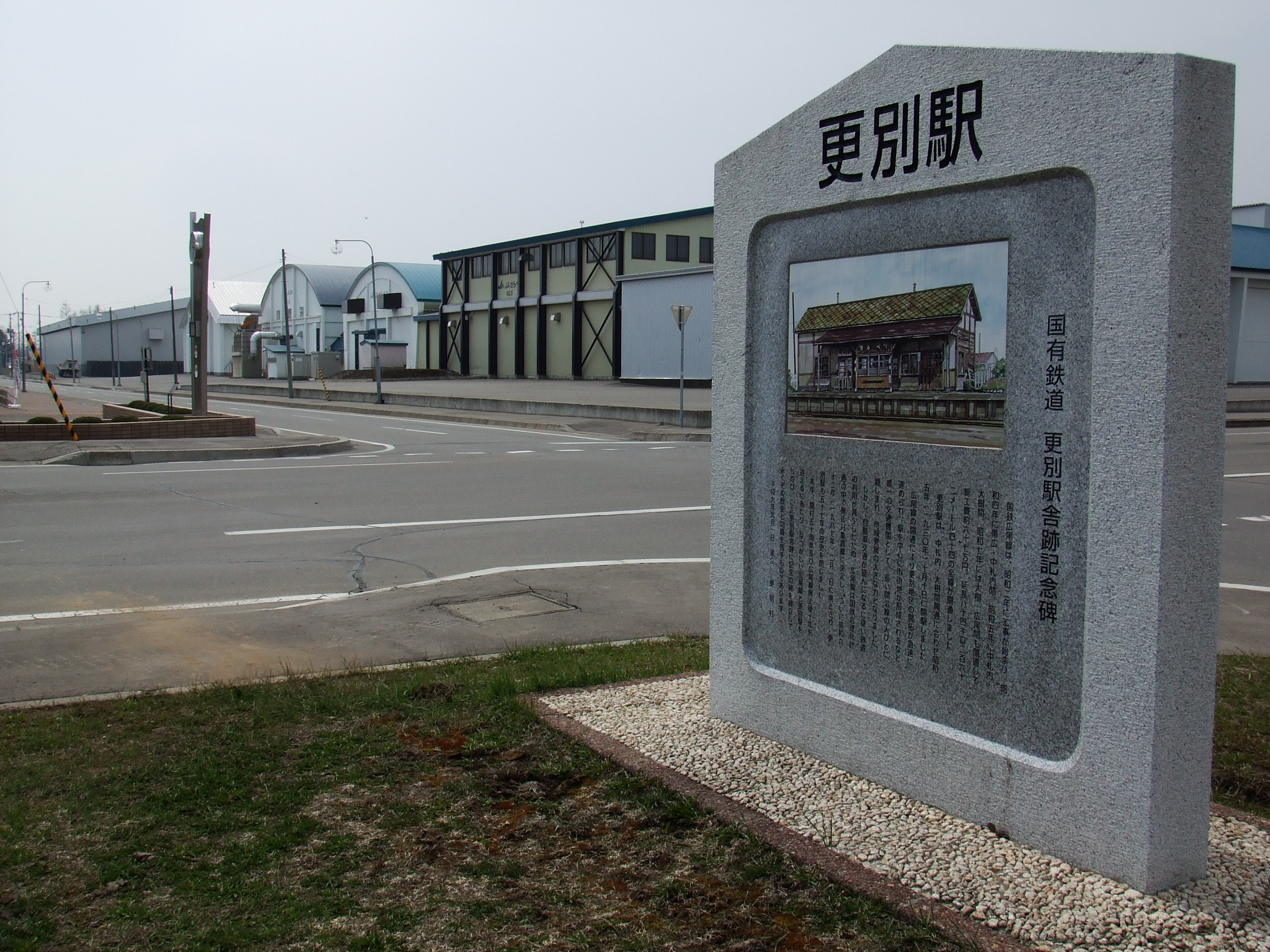
Site of Sarabetsu railway station

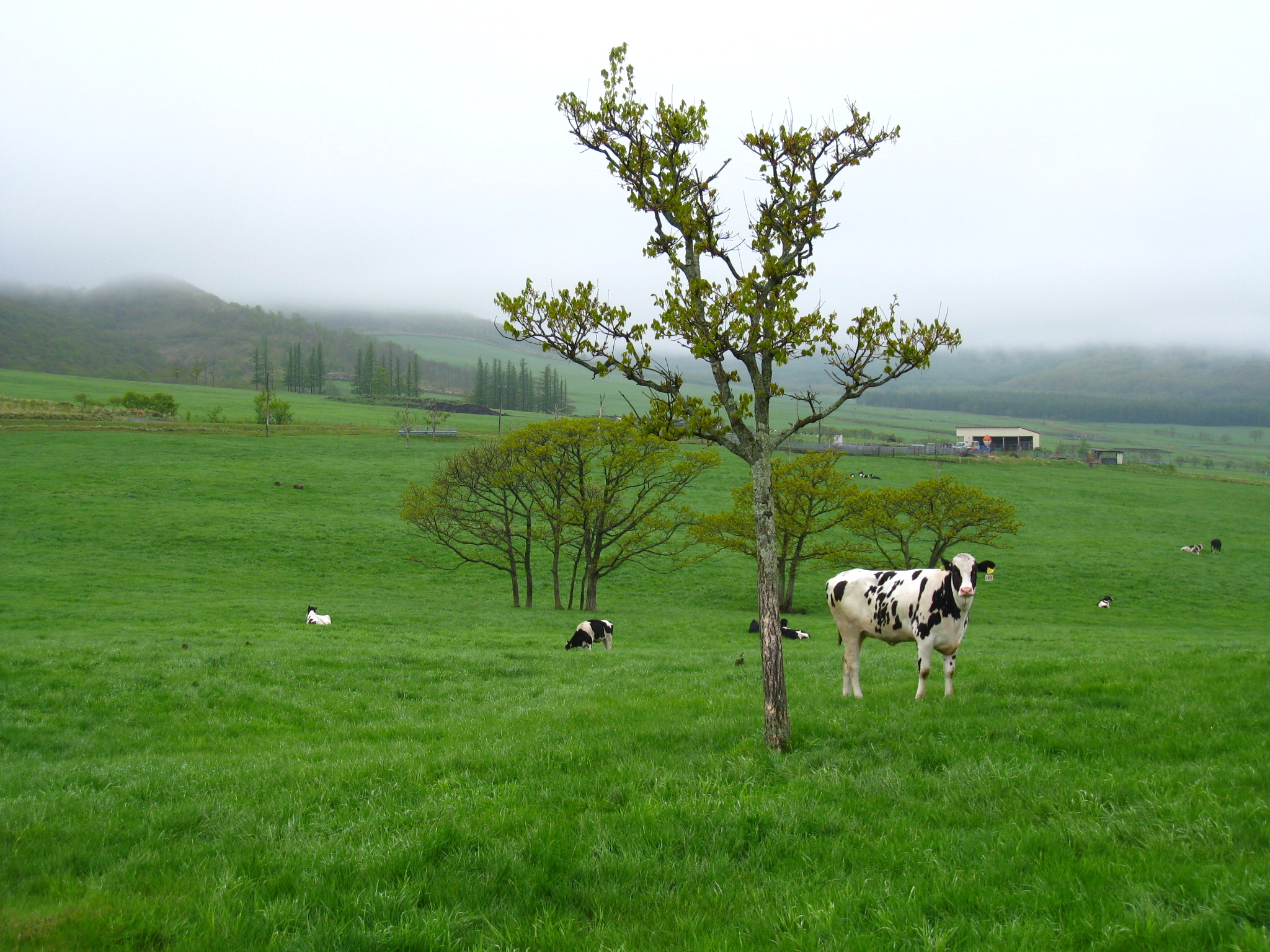
Ranch in Sarabetsu

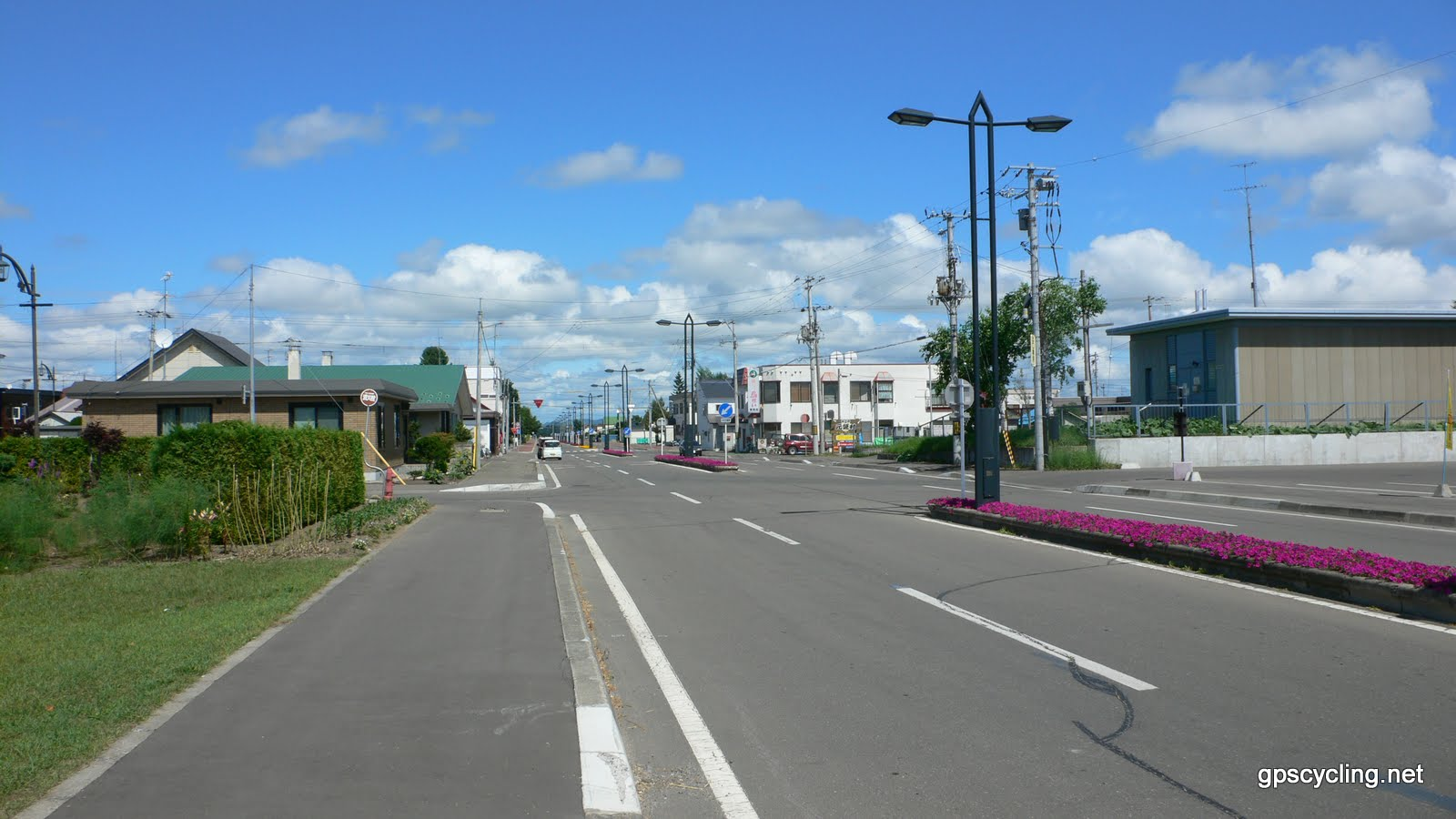
Main Street in Sarabetsu

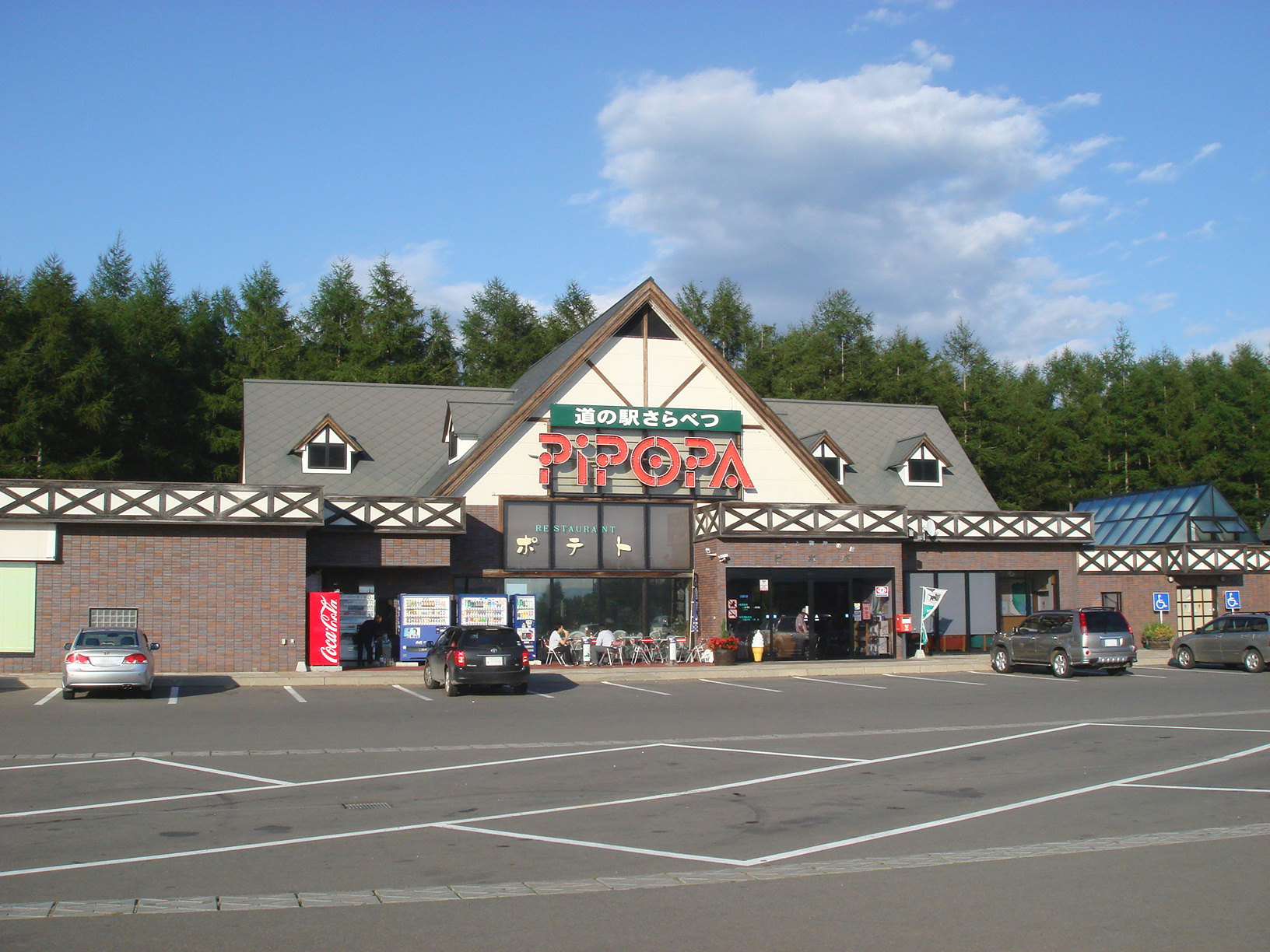
Sarabetsu road station

== Mascot ==
Don-chan, the town's mascot

Sarabetsu's mascot is Don-chan (しばれ君). He is an acorn. His goal is to have the town develop like a tree.
