= Hiroo Line =

Former railway line in Hokkaido, Japan

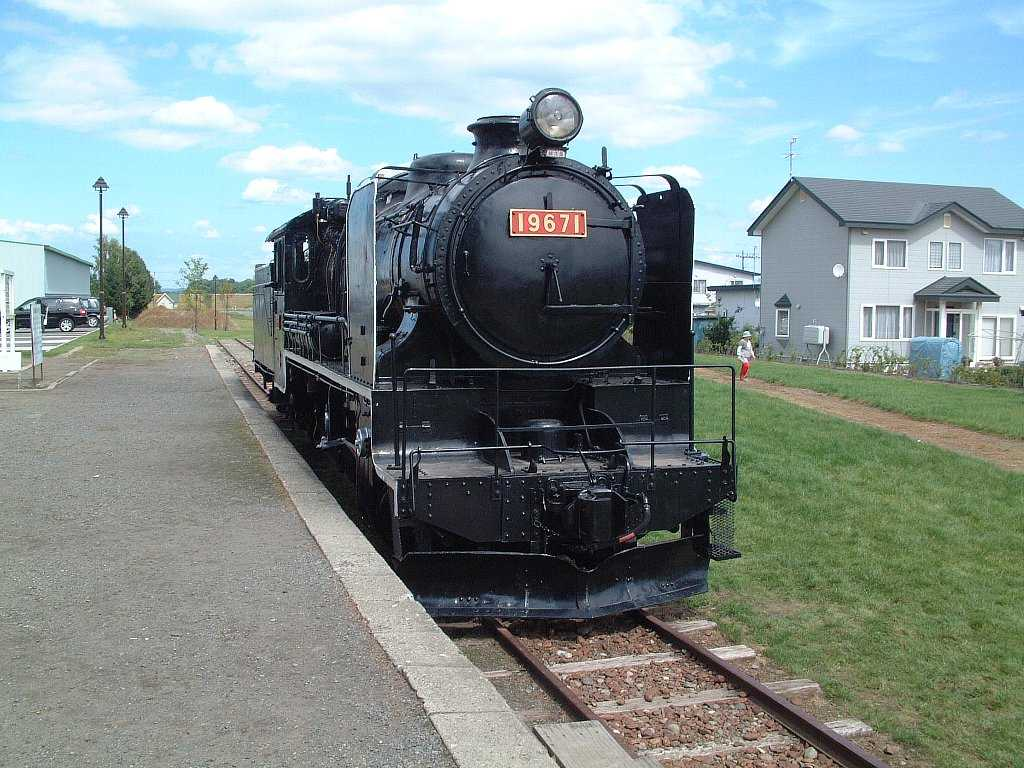
- A JNR 9600 which was used on the line

Overview
- Status: Closed
- Owner: Japan National Railways
- Termini: Obihiro; Hiroo
- Stations: 17

Service
- Type: Regional rail
- Operator(s): Japan National Railways

History
- Opened: 2 November 1929
- Closed: 2 February 1987

Technical
- Line length: 84.0 km (52.2 mi)
- Number of tracks: Entire line single tracked
- Character: Rural
- Track gauge: 1,067 mm (3 ft 6 in)
- Electrification: None

The Hiroo Line (広尾線, Hiroo-sen) was a railway line in Hokkaido, Japan operated by the Japanese National Railways. The line was in operation from 1929 to 1987.

== Stations ==
As of its closure on February 2, 1987, the line had 17 stations:

Station name	km	Connections	Location
Obihiro Station	0.0	Nemuro Main Line, Shihoro Line	Obihiro, Hokkaido
Yoda Station	4.1		Makubetsu, Hokkaido
Kita-Aikoku Station	6.7		Obihiro, Hokkaido
Aikoku Station	11.0		Obihiro, Hokkaido
Taishō Station	16.7		Obihiro, Hokkaido
Kōfuku Station	22.0		Obihiro, Hokkaido
Naka-Statsunai Station	28.1		Nakasatsunai, Hokkaido
Sarabetsu Station	35.4		Sarabetsu, Hokkaido
Kami-Sarabetsu Station	42.0		Sarabetsu, Hokkaido
Chūrui Station	50.0		Chūrui, Hokkaido
Tokachi-Tōwa Station	54.4		Taiki, Hokkaido
Taiki Station	60.6		Taiki, Hokkaido
Ishizaka Station	64.9		Taiki, Hokkaido
Toyoni Station	71.2		Hiroo, Hokkaido
Nozuka Station	76.3		Hiroo, Hokkaido
Shinsei Station	79.1		Hiroo, Hokkaido
Hiroo Station	84.0		Hiroo, Hokkaido
