= Obihiro-Hiroo Expressway =

Incomplete expressway in Hokkaido, Japan

Obihiro-Hiroo Expressway
- 帯広広尾自動車道

Route information
- Maintained by Ministry of Land, Infrastructure, Transport and Tourism
- Length: 57.3 km (35.6 mi)
- Existed: 2003–present

Major junctions
- North end: Obihiro Junction; Dōtō Expressway in Memuro
- South end: Chūrui-Taiki Interchange; National Route 236 in Taiki

Location
- Country: Japan

Highway system
- National highways of Japan; Expressways of Japan

The Obihiro-Hiroo Expressway (帯広広尾自動車道, Obihiro-Hiroo Jidōsha-dō) is an incomplete two-lane national expressway in Tokachi Subprefecture, Hokkaido. It is owned and operated primarily by the Ministry of Land, Infrastructure, Transport and Tourism (MLIT), but has a short section maintained and tolled by the East Nippon Expressway Company at its northern terminus with the Dōtō Expressway. The route is signed as an auxiliary route of National Route 236 as well E60 under MLIT's "2016 Proposal for Realization of Expressway Numbering."

== Route description ==
The speed limit is 100 km/h for the entire route. There is only one lane travelling in each direction along the entirety of the expressway.

== History ==
The first section of the Obihiro-Hiroo Expressway opened on 15 March 2003 between the Dōtō Expressway and Hokkaido Route 1153 in Obihiro. The next addition opened three years later, extending the expressway 13.1 kilometres (8.1 mi) to Hokkaido Route 1157 (Obihiro Airport Road). In 2008 the route was extended to Nakasatsunai. After five years, the next section to Sarabetsu was added. As of February 2019, the most recent addition was completed in 2015, extending the route to its current southern terminus at Chūrui-Taiki Interchange.

== Future ==
There are plans to extend the expressway 15.1 kilometres (9.4 mi) south from Chūrui-Taiki Interchange in Taiki to Hiroo.

== Junction list ==
The entire expressway is in Hokkaido.

Location	km	mi	Exit	Name	Destinations	Notes
Memuro	0	0.0	9/TB	Obihiro	Dōtō Expressway– Sapporo, Kushiro, Kitami	Northern terminus of the expressway
Memuro	4.5	2.8	1	Memuro-Obihiro	Hokkaido Route 1152 to National Route 38 – Central Obihiro	
Obihiro	16.3	10.1	2	Obihiro-kawanishi	Hokkaido Route 1153 to National Route 236 – Nakasatsunai, Tokachi–Obihiro Airport	
Obihiro	29.4	18.3	3	Kōfuku	Hokkaido Route 1157 (Obihiro Airport Road) to National Route 236 – Hiroo, Kōfuku Station (closed), Tokachi–Obihiro Airport	
Nakasatsunai	35.4	22.0	4	Nakasatsunai	Hokkaido Route 1166 to National Route 236 – Obihiro	
Sarabetsu	41.9	26.0	5	Sarabetsu	Hokkaido Route 716 to National Route 236 – Central Sarabetsu, Obihiro	
Makubetsu	54.9	34.1	6	Chūrui	National Route 236 – Nakasatsunai, Taiki	
Taiki	57.3	35.6	7	Chūrui-Taiki	Unnamed municipal road to National Route 236 – Obihiro, Hiroo	Southern terminus of the expressway (as of February 2019)
1.000 mi = 1.609 km; 1.000 km = 0.621 mi: Electronic toll collection

== See also ==
- Japan National Route 236
- Dōtō Expressway
