= Hidakasanmyaku-Erimo-Tokachi National Park =

National park in Hokkaido, Japan

- 日高山脈襟裳十勝国立公園
- IUCN category II (national park)
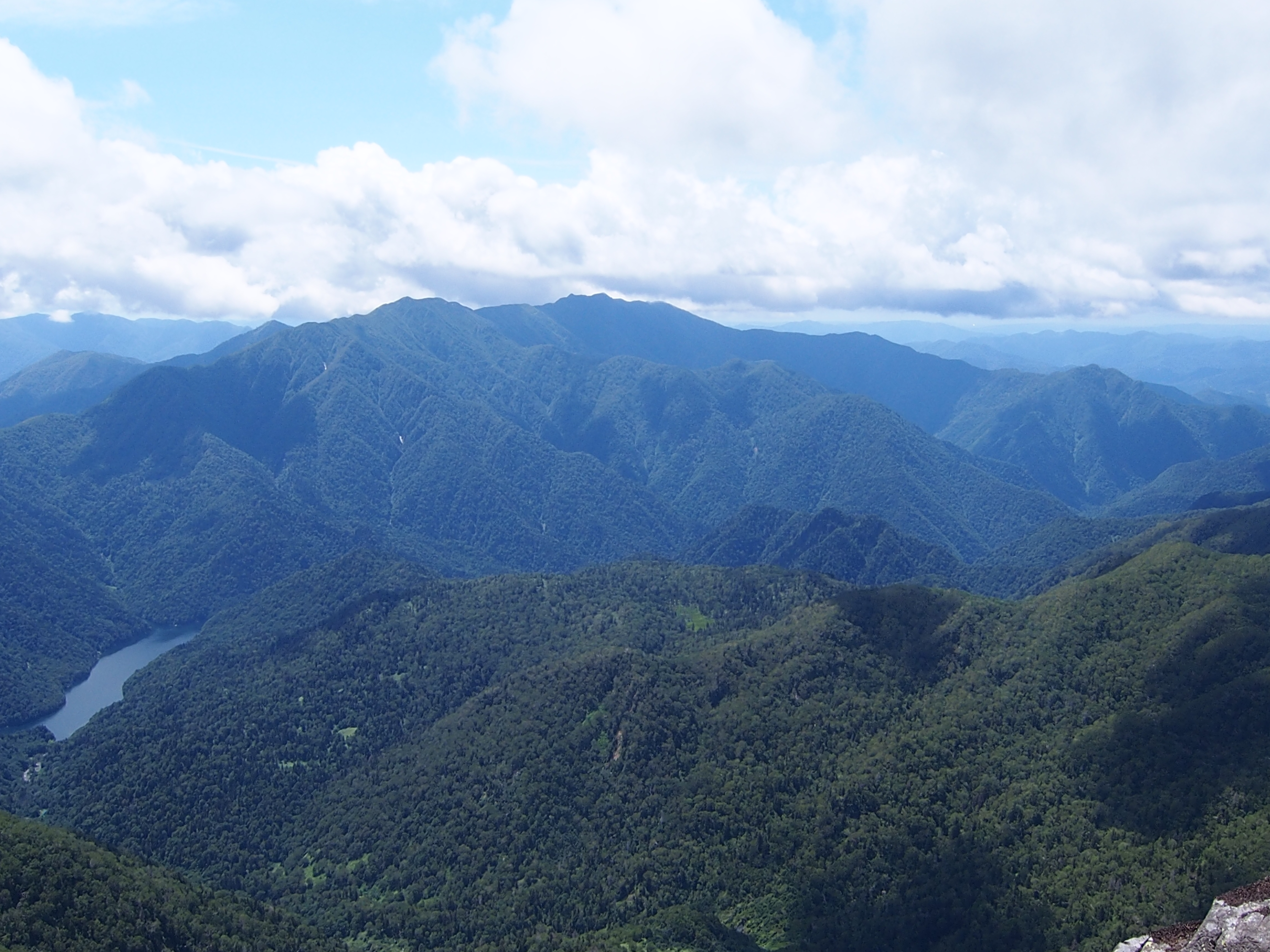
- A view from Mount Poroshiri

- Location within Hokkaido Location within Japan
- Location: Hokkaido, Japan
- Coordinates: 42°23′19″N 142°57′6″E
- Area: 2,456.68 km^{2} (948.53 sq mi)
- Established: 25 June 2024
- Governing body: Ministry of the Environment (Japan)

Hidakasanmyaku-Erimo-Tokachi National Park (日高山脈襟裳十勝国立公園, Hidaka-sanmyaku-Erimo-Tokachi Kokuritsu-kōen) is a national park in south-central Hokkaido, Japan. Encompassing much of the Hidaka Mountains as well as Cape Erimo, it is the largest in the country by land area.

== History ==
Erimo Prefectural Park was first established in 1950, before its redesignation as Erimo Prefectural Natural Park in 1958. On 1 October 1981, the park was elevated to the status of a quasi-national park and renamed Hidaka-sanmyaku Erimo Quasi-National Park (日高山脈襟裳国定公園). On 25 June 2024, the park was once again elevated in status and renamed Hidakasanmyaku-Erimo-Tokachi National Park. At the same time, the area designated for protection was increased from 1,034.47 square kilometres (399.41 sq mi) to 2,456.68 square kilometres (948.53 sq mi).

== Related municipalities ==
The park includes areas of:

- Biratori
- Erimo
- Hidaka
- Hiroo
- Memuro
- Nakasatsunai
- Niikappu
- Obihiro
- Samani
- Shimizu
- Shinhidaka
- Taiki
- Urakawa

== See also ==
- List of national parks of Japan
- Media related to Hidakasanmyaku-Erimo-Tokachi National Park at Wikimedia Commons
