= Kōfuku Station =

Closed railway station in Hokkaido, Japan

Coordinates: 42°44′43″N 143°09′42″E

Kōfuku Station 幸福駅
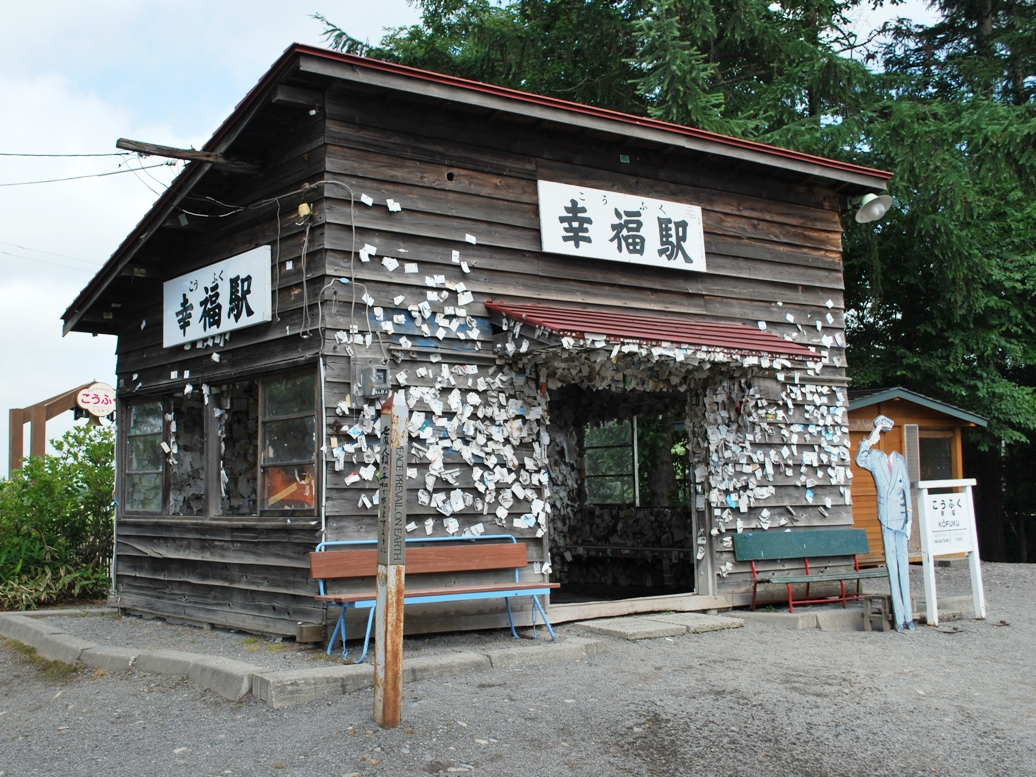
- The station building, August 2009

General information
- Location: Obihiro, Hokkaido; Japan
- Line: Hiroo Line (closed)

History
- Opened: 1956
- Closed: 1987
Location

Kōfuku Station (幸福駅, Kōfuku-eki) is a closed railway station on the defunct Hiroo Line in Obihiro, Hokkaido, Japan. Now owned by the Kofuku town residents' association, even after its closure in 1987, it remains a popular sightseeing spot because of its name, which means "happiness" in Japanese.

== Lines ==
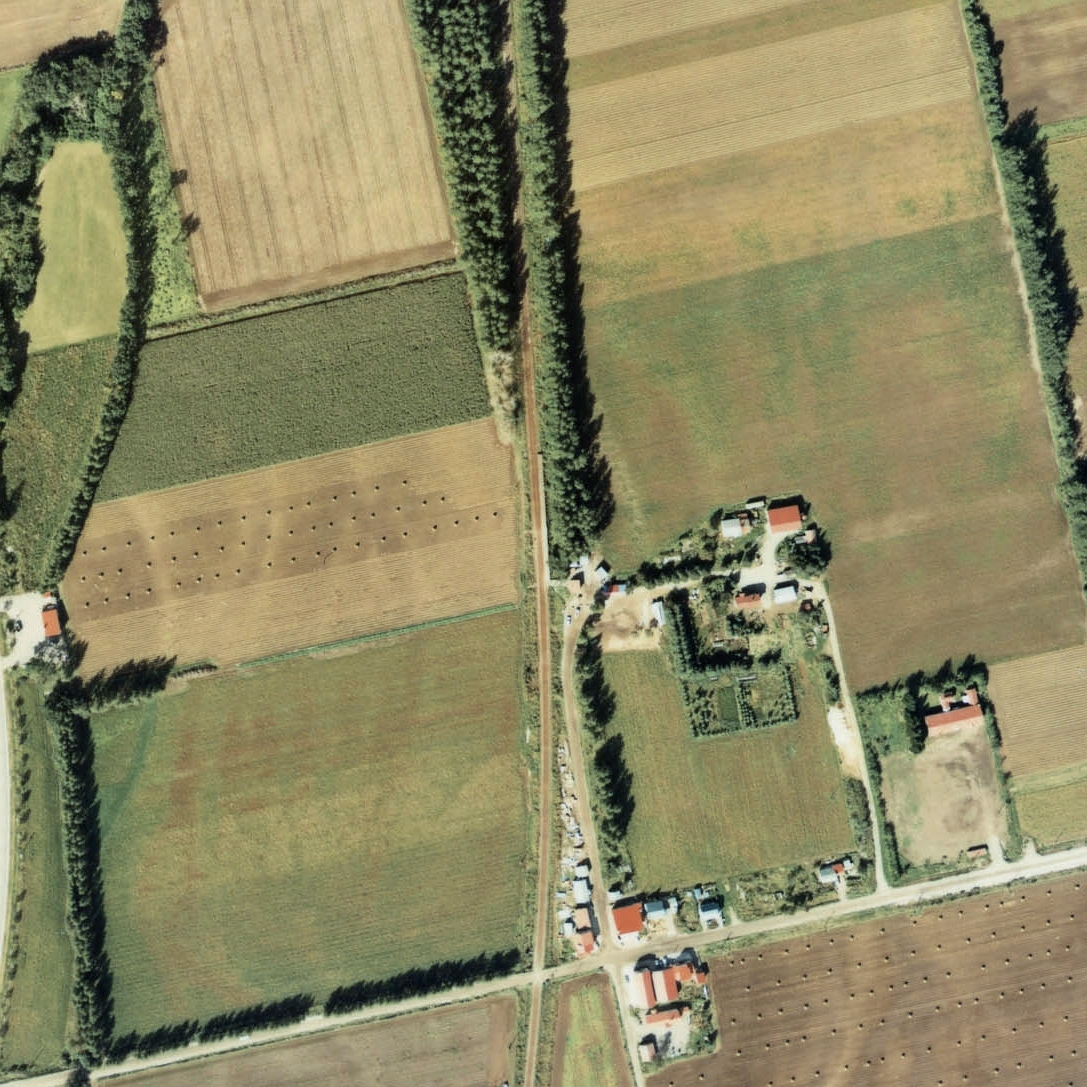
Aerial photograph of the station area in 1977

Kōfuku Station was served by the now-closed 84 km Hiroo Line between Obihiro and Hiroo Station in Hiroo, and was located 22.0 km from the starting point of the line at Obihiro.

== Station layout ==
The original station building remains standing, and many people paste business cards and messages on the walls of the waiting room, hoping for happiness.

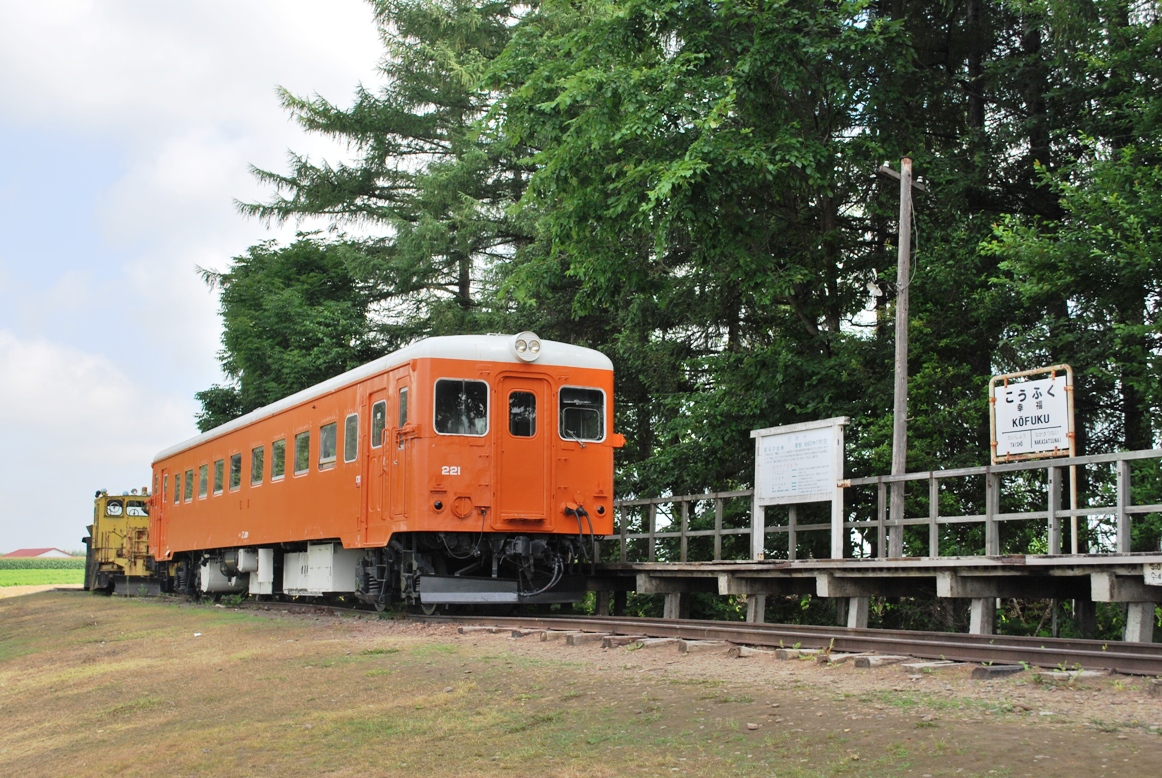
The former platform, with preserved rolling stock, August 2009

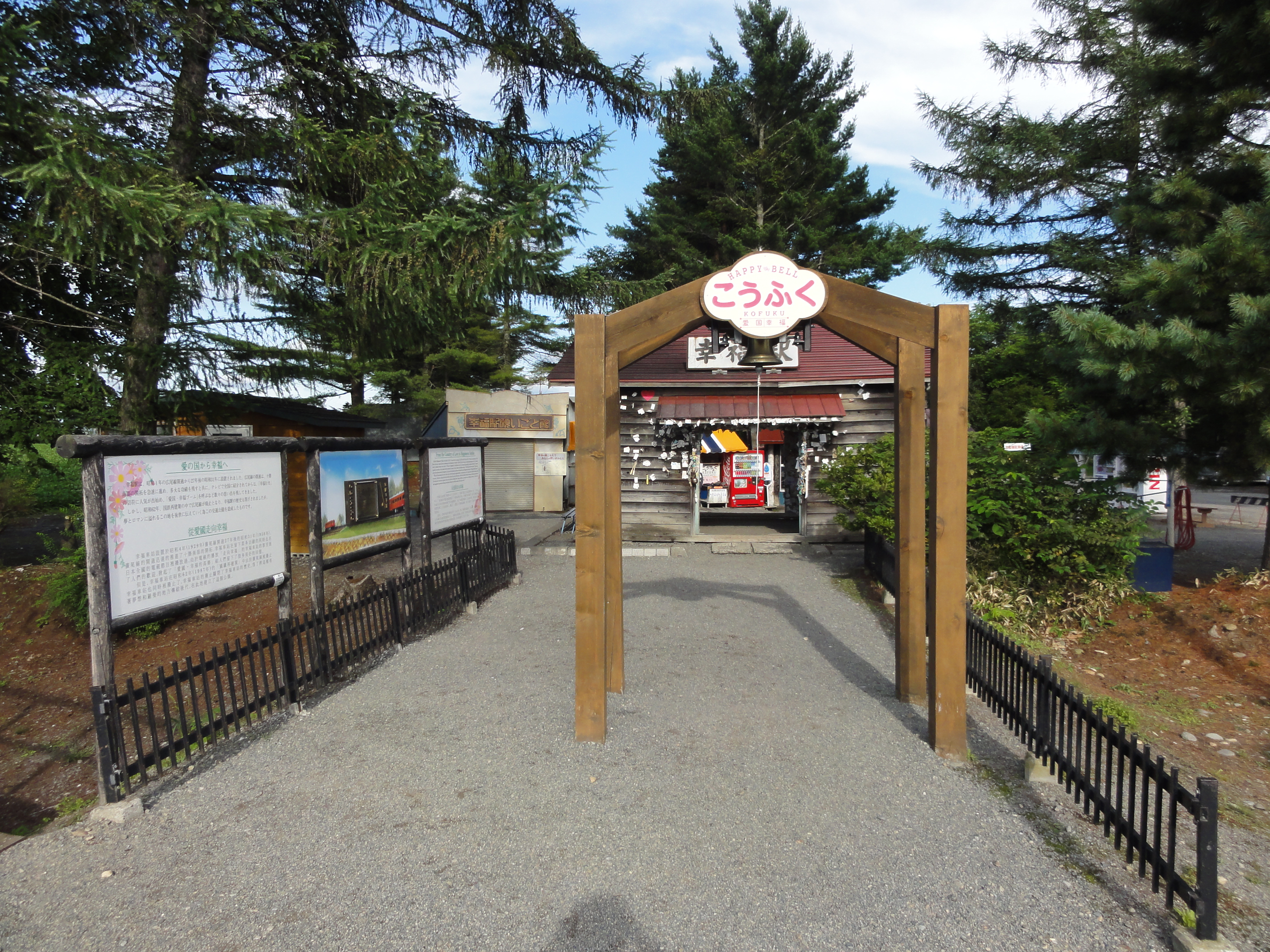
The "Happy Bell" at the station, August 2011

== History ==
The station opened on 1 November 1956. It closed in 1987 when the entire line closed just before privatization of Japanese National Railways (JNR).

The station become famous after it was featured on a Japanese NHK TV travel documentary programme in 1973. In fiscal 2012, it was visited by about 175,000 people, making it one of the top tourist attractions in the area.

The ageing station structure was scheduled to be renovated by Obihiro city government between September and November 2013, at a cost of 33 million yen.

== Surrounding area ==
The station takes its name from the name of the area in which it is located. Although the area was originally called Kōshin, it was changed to Kōfuku in around 1910 by combining the "Kō" of Kōshin with "Fuku" from Fukui, denoting the farmers from Fukui Prefecture who moved to the area around 1902 after being displaced by flooding.
