= Taiki, Hokkaido =

Town in Japan

Taiki 大樹町 Taiki-chō
- Town
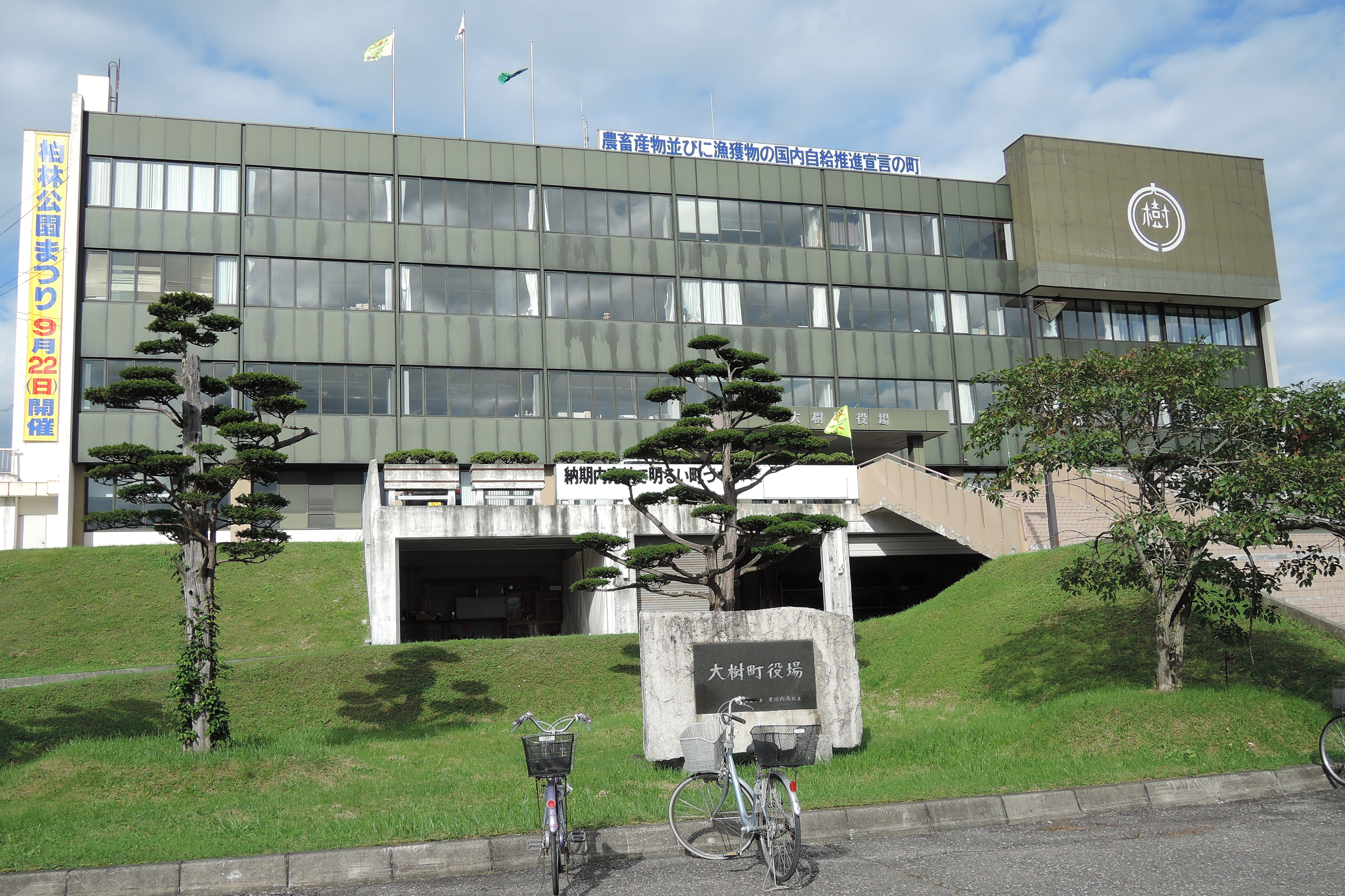
- Taiki Town hall

- Flag Emblem

- Location of Taiki in Hokkaido (Tokachi Subprefecture)
- Interactive map of Taiki
- Coordinates: 42°29′51″N 143°16′44″E
- Country: Japan
- Region: Hokkaido
- Prefecture: Hokkaido (Tokachi Subprefecture)
- District: Hiroo

Area
  - Total: 815.67 km^{2} (314.93 sq mi)

Population (December 31, 2025)
  - Total: 5,168
  - Density: 6.336/km^{2} (16.41/sq mi)
- Time zone: UTC+09:00 (JST)
- City hall address: 33 Higashihondori, Taiki-cho, Hiroo-gun, Hokkaido 089-2195
- Climate: Dfb
- Website: www.town.taiki.hokkaido.jp/index.html
- Symbols
- Bird: Eurasian skylark
- Flower: Cossmos
- Tree: Daimyo oak

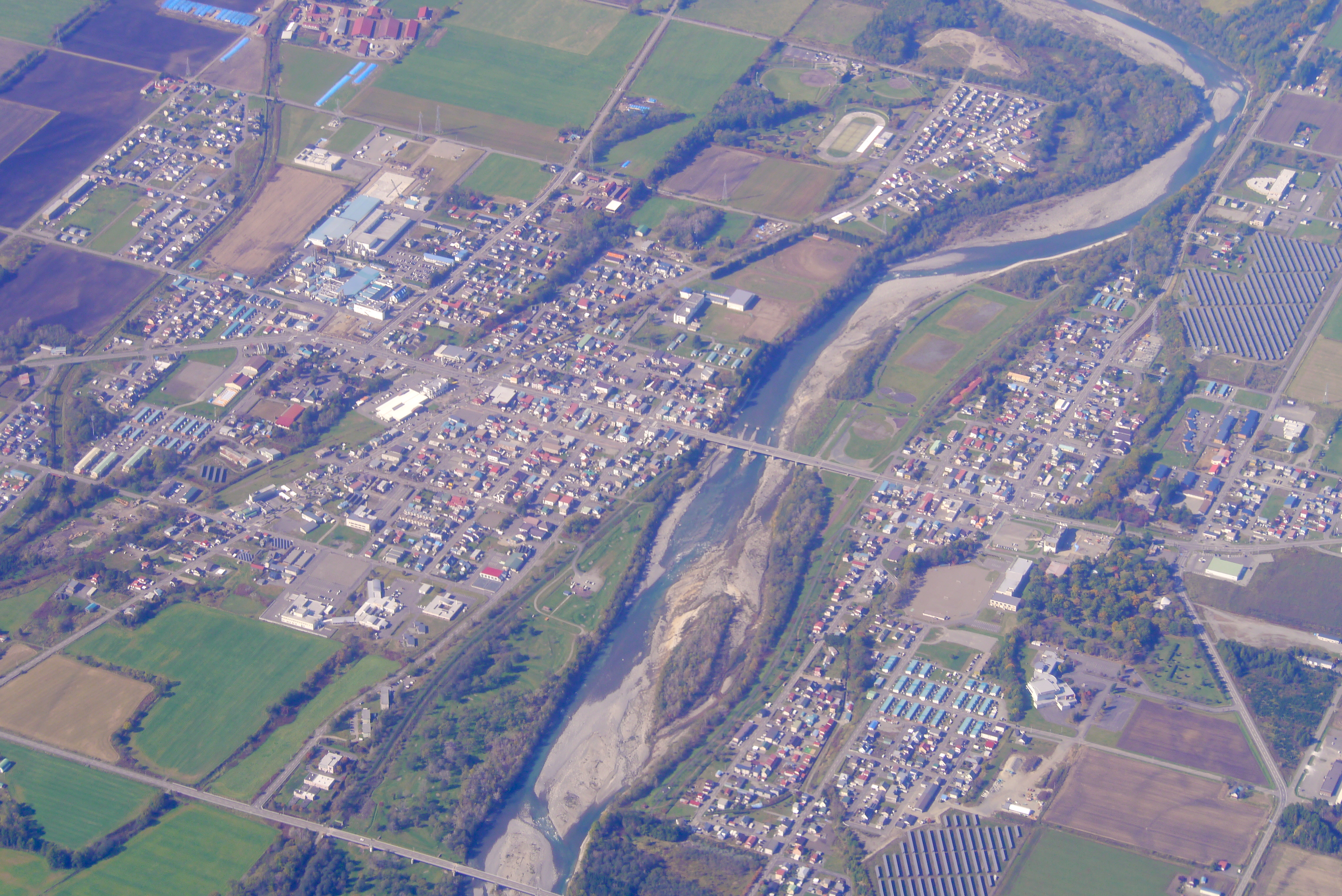
Downtown Taiki with the Rekifune River flowing through it, 2020

Taiki (大樹町, Taiki-chō) is a town located in Tokachi Subprefecture, Hokkaidō, Japan. As of 31 December 2025, the town had an estimated population of 5,168 in 2792 households, and a population density of 6 people per km^{2}. The total area of the town is 815.67 km^{2} (314.93 sq mi).

== Geography ==
Taiki is located in southeastern Hokkaido in the eastern part of the Tokachi Subprefecture. The western part of the town is mountainous, originating from the Hidaka Mountains, and is part of the Hidakasanmyaku-Erimo-Tokachi National Park. The eastern part is flat, bordering the Pacific Ocean. The Rekifune River, which flows through the town, is the only river that flows through the town of Taiki, from its source in the Hidaka Mountains to the Pacific Ocean. Its highest point is Mount Yaoromappu at 1,794 meters above sea level.

=== Neighboring municipalities ===
- Nakasatsunai
- Sarabetsu
- Makubetsu
- Toyokoro
- Hiroo
- Shinhidaka
- Urakawa

=== Climate ===
According to the Köppen climate classification, Taiki has a humid continental climate. It has large temperature differences, including large annual and daily temperature ranges. Although it faces the Pacific Ocean, winters are extremely cold, with the average temperature in January hovering around -9 °C, and temperatures dropping below -20 °C daily. Diamond dust can often be seen on the Rekifune River. During the harsh winter months, temperatures fluctuate greatly over short periods of time.

Climate data for Taiki（1991 - 2020）
Month	Jan	Feb	Mar	Apr	May	Jun	Jul	Aug	Sep	Oct	Nov	Dec	Year
Record high °C (°F)	9.0 (48.2)	15.5 (59.9)	17.0 (62.6)	29.1 (84.4)	32.7 (90.9)	35.2 (95.4)	36.3 (97.3)	35.8 (96.4)	33.4 (92.1)	28.6 (83.5)	21.5 (70.7)	16.3 (61.3)	36.3 (97.3)
Mean daily maximum °C (°F)	−1.8 (28.8)	−1.0 (30.2)	3.3 (37.9)	10.1 (50.2)	15.8 (60.4)	18.3 (64.9)	21.7 (71.1)	23.3 (73.9)	20.8 (69.4)	15.4 (59.7)	8.5 (47.3)	1.0 (33.8)	11.3 (52.3)
Daily mean °C (°F)	−8.8 (16.2)	−7.8 (18.0)	−2.2 (28.0)	4.5 (40.1)	9.9 (49.8)	13.4 (56.1)	17.3 (63.1)	18.8 (65.8)	15.7 (60.3)	9.4 (48.9)	2.7 (36.9)	−5.3 (22.5)	5.6 (42.1)
Mean daily minimum °C (°F)	−16.8 (1.8)	−16.8 (1.8)	−9.4 (15.1)	−1.8 (28.8)	3.8 (38.8)	8.8 (47.8)	13.6 (56.5)	15.0 (59.0)	10.9 (51.6)	3.4 (38.1)	−3.4 (25.9)	−12.3 (9.9)	−0.4 (31.3)
Record low °C (°F)	−29.1 (−20.4)	−29.8 (−21.6)	−26.2 (−15.2)	−16.0 (3.2)	−5.2 (22.6)	−1.0 (30.2)	4.5 (40.1)	6.2 (43.2)	−1.1 (30.0)	−6.6 (20.1)	−17.5 (0.5)	−28.1 (−18.6)	−29.8 (−21.6)
Average precipitation mm (inches)	33.7 (1.33)	26.9 (1.06)	49.2 (1.94)	71.2 (2.80)	107.1 (4.22)	109.0 (4.29)	132.9 (5.23)	166.2 (6.54)	202.2 (7.96)	128.5 (5.06)	72.9 (2.87)	46.3 (1.82)	1,146 (45.12)
Average snowfall cm (inches)	162 (64)	139 (55)	130 (51)	44 (17)	3 (1.2)	0 (0)	0 (0)	0 (0)	0 (0)	0 (0)	25 (9.8)	123 (48)	627 (247)
Average precipitation days (≥ 1.0 mm)	5.7	5.0	7.2	8.6	9.4	8.6	10.6	11.5	11.1	9.6	8.6	6.5	102.4
Mean monthly sunshine hours	162.6	157.9	187.2	177.6	174.8	137.9	116.1	122.7	136.2	163.0	154.8	154.0	1,844.8
Source 1: JMA
Source 2: JMA

=== Demographics ===
Per Japanese census data, the population of Taiki has declined in recent decades.

Historical population
Year	Pop.	±%
1970	8,814	—
1980	8,356	−5.2%
1990	7,483	−10.4%
2000	6,711	−10.3%
2010	5,982	−10.9%
2020	5,420	−9.4%

== History ==
The area of Taiki has been settled since the Jomon period. During the Edo period, gold dust was discovered, with gold panning operations starting around 1635 and settlements established by miners. Inō Tadataka surveyed the surrounding area in 1800, and Matsuura Takeshirō led an exploratory expedition in 1858. Farming settlers arrived from 1883 and the village of Taiki was established in 1923. In 1936, Emperor Hirohito toured the village and visited the Hokkaido Colonization Training Center. Taiki was raised to town status on April 1, 1951.

== Etymology ==
The name of the town comes from the Ainu word for "place where many trees grow."

== Government ==
Taiki has a mayor-council form of government with a directly elected mayor and a unicameral town council of 12 members. Taiki, as part of Tokachi Subprefecture, contributes four members to the Hokkaidō Prefectural Assembly. In terms of national politics, the town is part of the Hokkaidō 11th district of the lower house of the Diet of Japan.

The Japan Ground Self-Defense Force operates a training facility in Taiki.

== Economy ==
The town's main industries are dairy farming and commercial fishing. The Taiki factory of Snow Brand Milk Products (now Snow Brand Megmilk) is located here. The 2000 Snow Brand food poisoning incident occurred at this factory.

The town hosts the rocket launch site for Interstellar Technologies, the Taiki Aerospace Research Field (Hokkaido Spaceport), which is a JAXA facility.

== Education ==
Taiki has one public elementary school and one public middle school operated by the town. The town has one public high school operated by the Hokkaido Board of Education.

== Transportation ==
=== Railways ===
Taiki has not had any passenger railway services since the closure of the JR Hokkaido Hiroo Line in February 1987.

=== Highways ===
- Obihiro-Hiroo Expressway
- National Route 236
- National Route 336

== Sister city relations ==
- Dashu District, Kaohsiung Republic of China (Taiwan), Friendship city

== Local attractions ==
- Bansei Onsen, a natural hot spring bath facility, operates on the Pacific coast of Taiki.
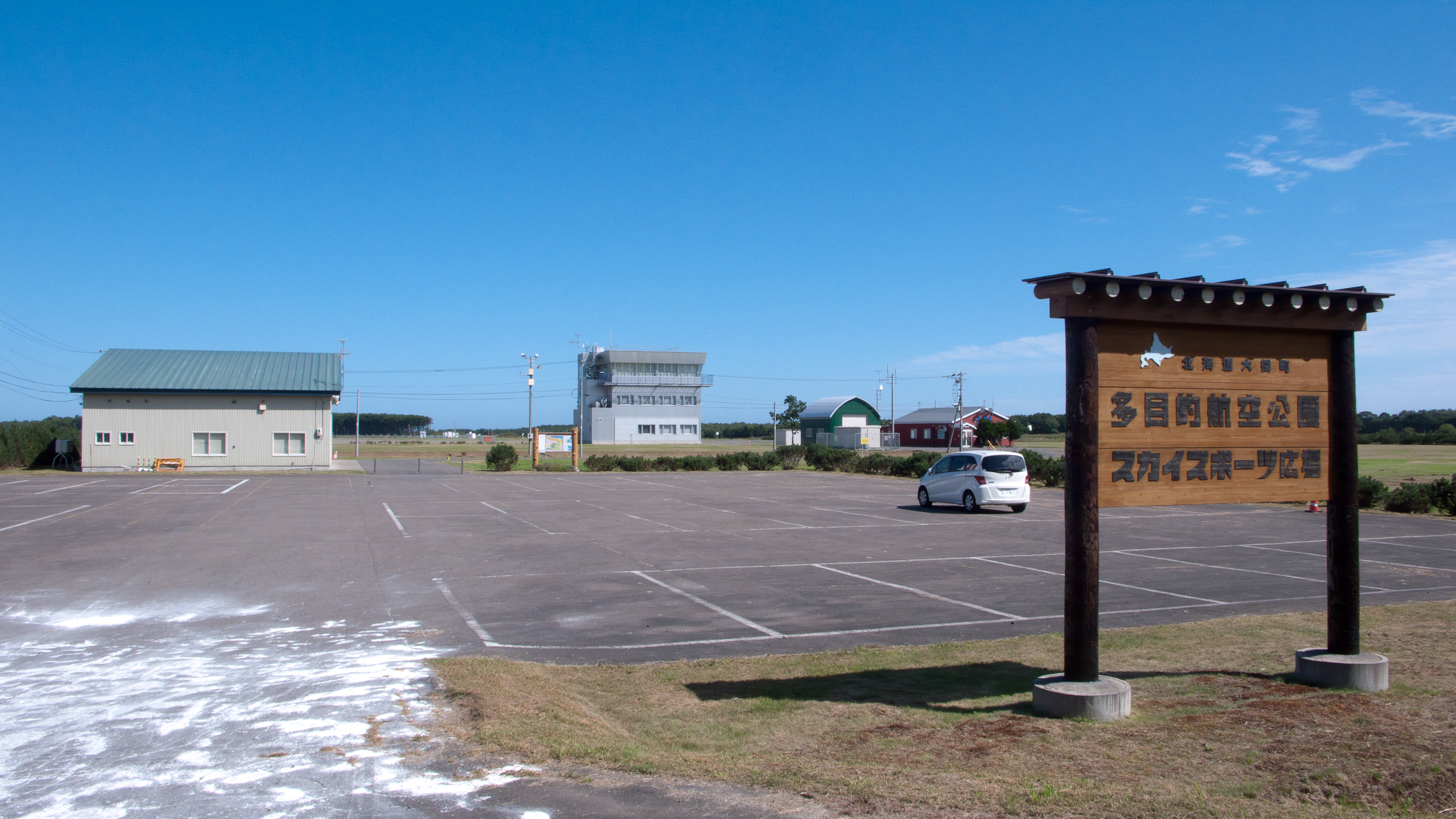
Taiki Aerospace Research Field

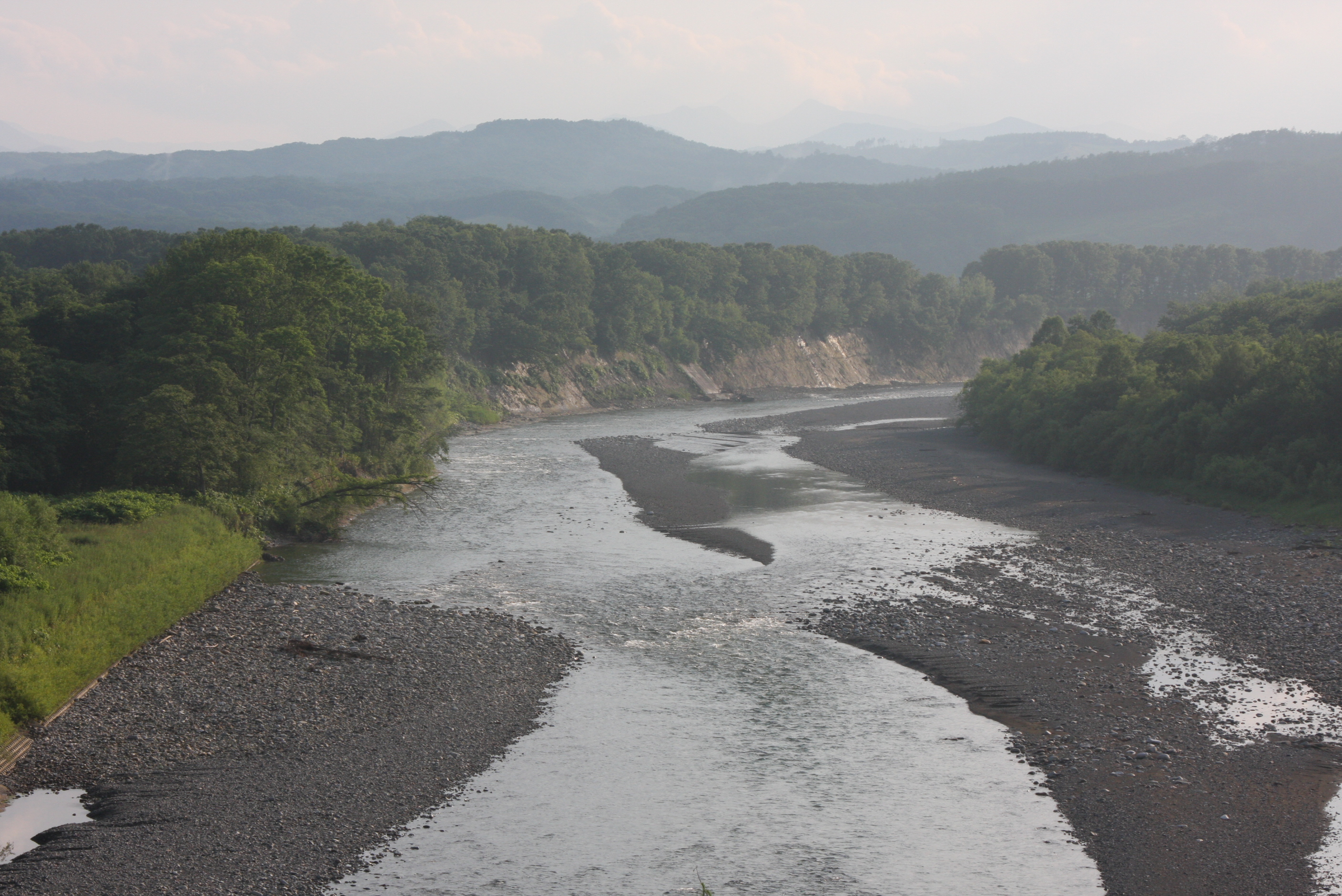
Rekifune River

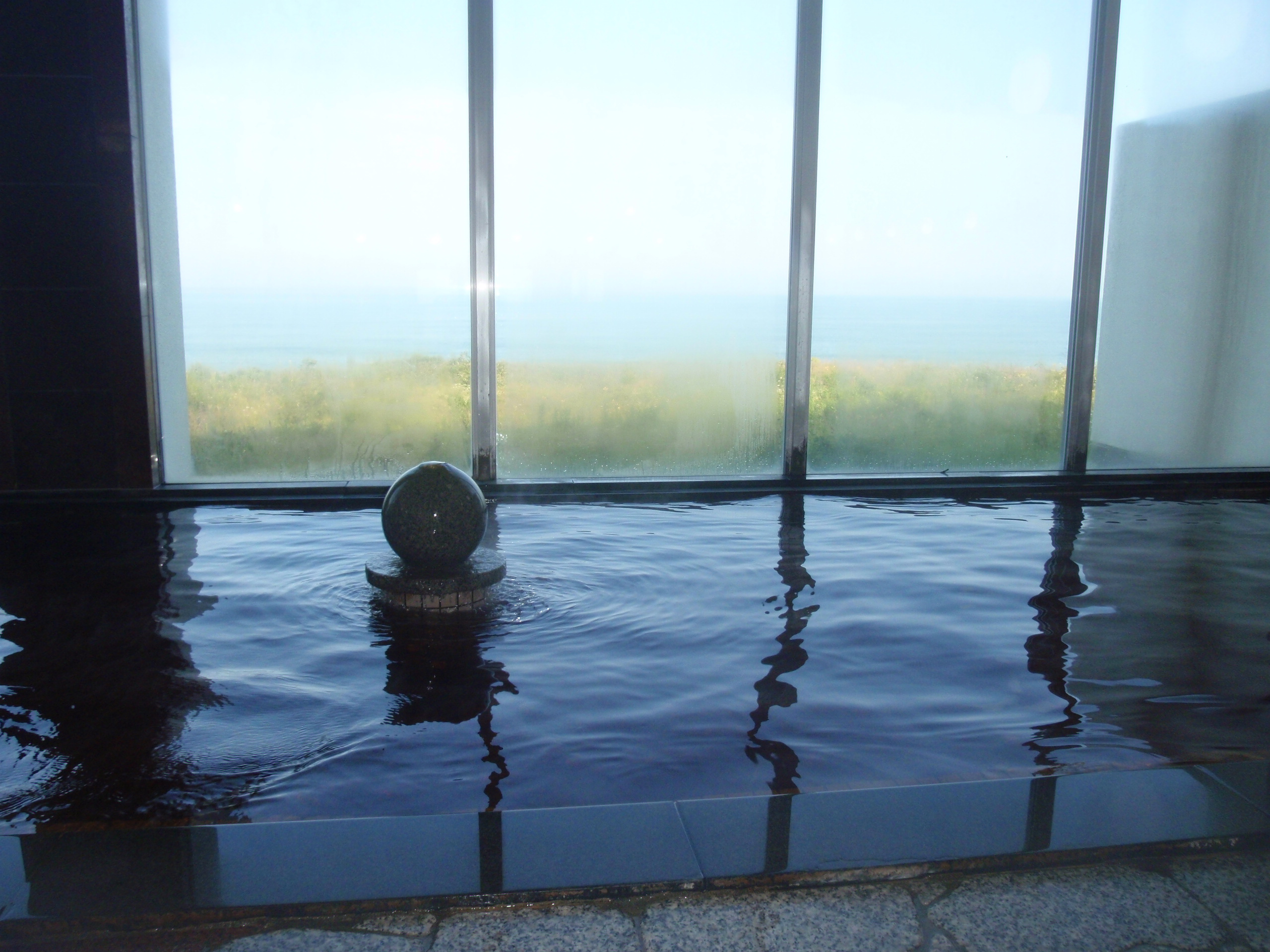
Bansei Onsen

== Notable people from Taiki ==
- Takafumi Horie, internet entrepreneur, relocated to Taiki in 2015.
- Momoka Horikawa, Olympic speed skater
- Teruhiro Sugimori, Olympic speed skater

=== Mascot ===
Cospy, the town's mascot

Taiki's mascot is Cospy (コスピー, Kosupī). She is a bright and gentle cosmos flower fairy. She usually ends her sentences with "pi" (ぴ). Her dream is to join JAXA. Her birthday is October 1.
