= Nakasatsunai =

Town in Japan

Nakasatsunai 中札内村 Nakasatsuna-mura
- Village
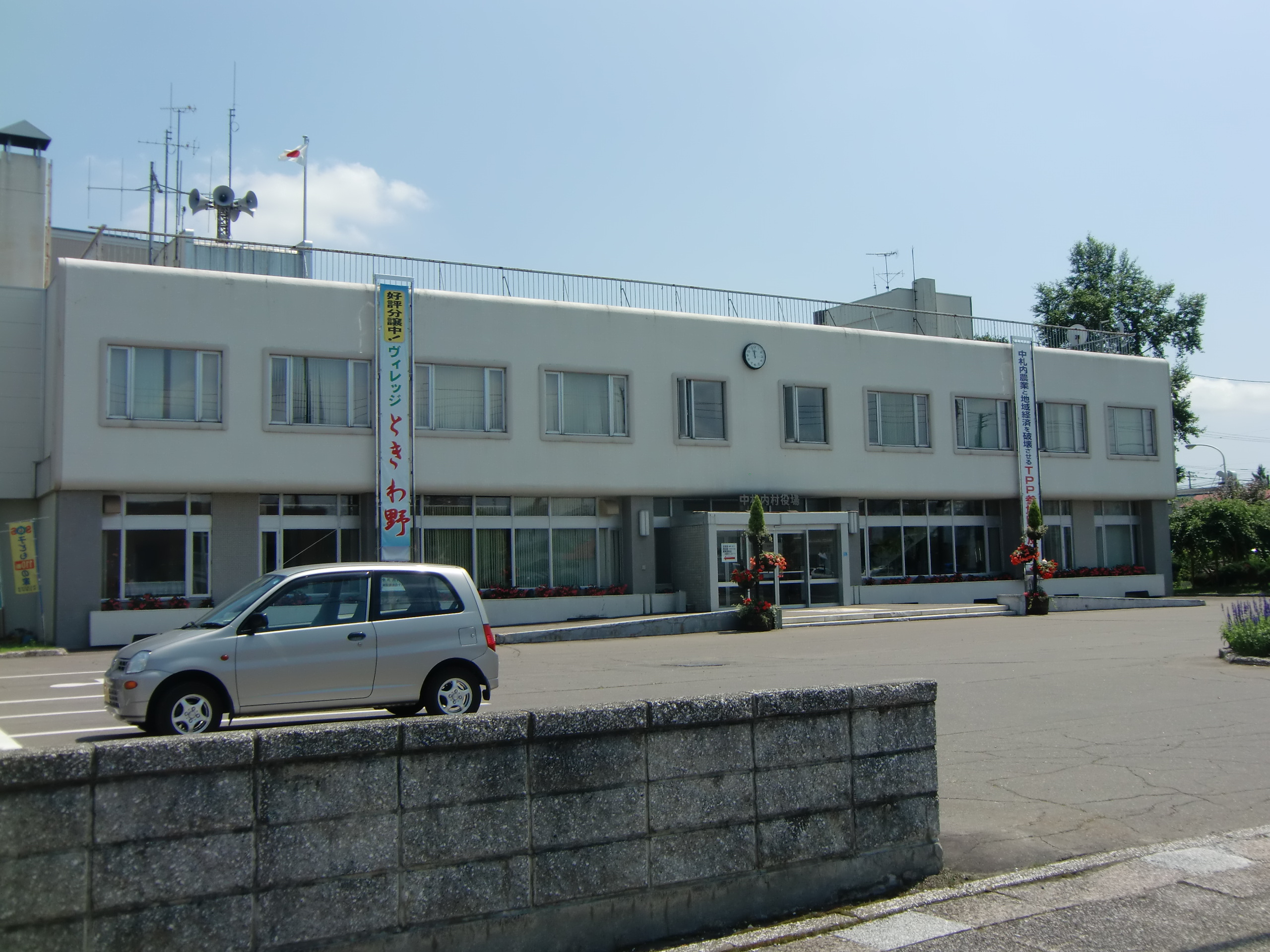
- Nakasatsunai village office

- Flag Emblem

- Location of Nakasatsunai in Hokkaido (Tokachi Subprefecture)

- Coordinates: 42°41′53″N 143°08′03″E
- Country: Japan
- Region: Hokkaido
- Prefecture: Hokkaido (Tokachi Subprefecture)
- District: Kasai

Area
  - Total: 292.58 km^{2} (112.97 sq mi)

Population (November 30, 2025)
  - Total: 3,828
  - Density: 13.08/km^{2} (33.89/sq mi)
- Time zone: UTC+09:00 (JST)
- City hall address: 2-1, Higashi 1-jo Minami 1-chome, Nakasatsunai Village, Kasai District, Hokkaido 089-1392
- Climate: Dfb
- Website: www.toyokoro.jp
- Symbols
- Bird: Eurasian skylark
- Flower: Lily of the valley
- Tree: Daimyo oak

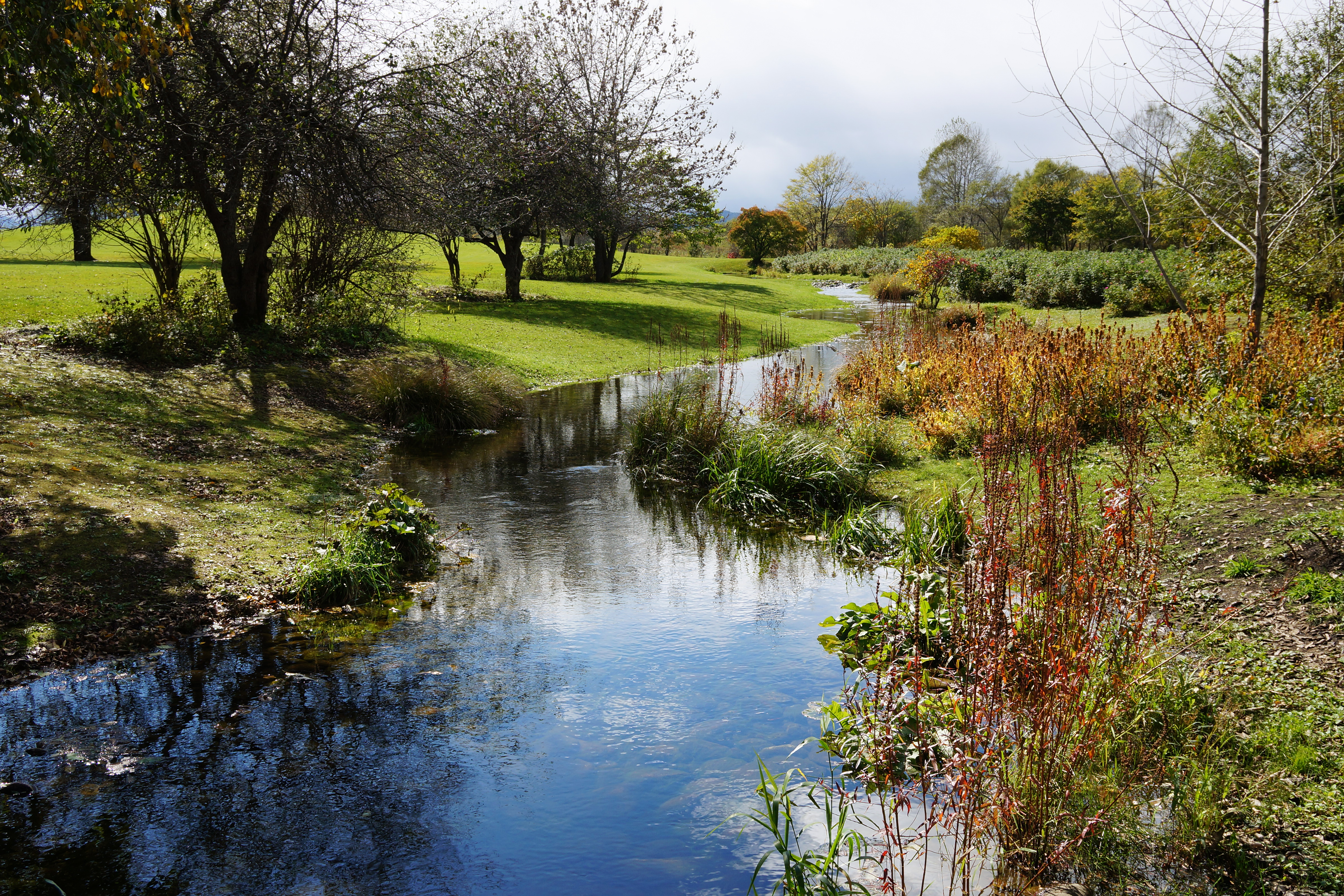
Rokka-no-mori Park

Nakasatsunai (中札内村, Nakasatsunai-mura) is a village located in Tokachi Subprefecture, Hokkaidō, Japan. As of 30 November 2025, the village had an estimated population of 3,828 in 1937 households, and a population density of 13 people per km^{2}. The total area of the town is 536.71 km^{2} (207.22 sq mi).

== Geography ==
Nakasatsunai is located in southeastern Hokkaido in the southwestern Tokachi Plain. The village stretches across the Satsunai River basin, which originates in the central Hidaka Mountains. The western part of the village is part of the Hidakasanmyaku-Erimo-Tokachi National Park. Mount Kamuiekuuchikaushi, at 1979 meters, is the highest point in the village.

=== Neighboring municipalities ===
- Obihiro
- Sarabetsu
- Taiki
- Shinhidaka
- Niikappu

=== Climate ===
According to the Köppen climate classification, Nakasatsunai has a humid continental climate. It has large temperature differences, including large annual and daily temperature ranges. It receives a lot of snow, and is designated as a heavy snow area. In winter, temperatures of around -25 °C are not uncommon, making it extremely cold.

Climate data for Nakasatsunai Averages：1991 - 2020、Peaks：1977 - present）
| Month | Jan | Feb | Mar | Apr | May | Jun | Jul | Aug | Sep | Oct | Nov | Dec | Year |
|---|---|---|---|---|---|---|---|---|---|---|---|---|---|
| Record high °C (°F) | 9.2 (48.6) | 14.8 (58.6) | 15.3 (59.5) | 28.2 (82.8) | 36.7 (98.1) | 33.5 (92.3) | 35.1 (95.2) | 34.6 (94.3) | 31.5 (88.7) | 28.2 (82.8) | 20.8 (69.4) | 14.0 (57.2) | 36.7 (98.1) |
| Mean daily maximum °C (°F) | −2.9 (26.8) | −2.1 (28.2) | 2.2 (36.0) | 9.4 (48.9) | 15.8 (60.4) | 19.0 (66.2) | 22.2 (72.0) | 23.2 (73.8) | 20.1 (68.2) | 14.2 (57.6) | 7.0 (44.6) | −0.3 (31.5) | 10.6 (51.1) |
| Daily mean °C (°F) | −8.5 (16.7) | −7.7 (18.1) | −2.7 (27.1) | 4.1 (39.4) | 10.0 (50.0) | 13.7 (56.7) | 17.4 (63.3) | 18.5 (65.3) | 15.0 (59.0) | 8.7 (47.7) | 2.0 (35.6) | −5.4 (22.3) | 5.4 (41.7) |
| Mean daily minimum °C (°F) | −15.5 (4.1) | −15.2 (4.6) | −9.0 (15.8) | −1.3 (29.7) | 4.3 (39.7) | 9.1 (48.4) | 13.6 (56.5) | 14.7 (58.5) | 10.4 (50.7) | 3.3 (37.9) | −3.1 (26.4) | −11.5 (11.3) | −0.1 (31.8) |
| Record low °C (°F) | −29.4 (−20.9) | −27.2 (−17.0) | −24.7 (−12.5) | −12.9 (8.8) | −5.0 (23.0) | −0.3 (31.5) | 4.2 (39.6) | 5.2 (41.4) | 0.1 (32.2) | −4.7 (23.5) | −15.3 (4.5) | −23.7 (−10.7) | −29.4 (−20.9) |
| Average precipitation mm (inches) | 52.2 (2.06) | 41.1 (1.62) | 62.1 (2.44) | 78.9 (3.11) | 102.8 (4.05) | 96.4 (3.80) | 126.5 (4.98) | 179.0 (7.05) | 194.4 (7.65) | 127.5 (5.02) | 86.1 (3.39) | 67.3 (2.65) | 1,216.6 (47.90) |
| Average snowfall cm (inches) | 144 (57) | 116 (46) | 117 (46) | 43 (17) | 4 (1.6) | 0 (0) | 0 (0) | 0 (0) | 0 (0) | 1 (0.4) | 31 (12) | 130 (51) | 588 (231) |
| Mean monthly sunshine hours | 144.6 | 145.4 | 186.1 | 185.4 | 183.0 | 148.7 | 124.1 | 126.9 | 136.9 | 162.8 | 149.7 | 137.2 | 1,834.1 |

=== Demographics ===
Per Japanese census data, the population of Nakasatsunai has declined in recent decades.

Historical population
| Year | Pop. | ±% |
|---|---|---|
| 1970 | 4,231 | — |
| 1980 | 3,785 | −10.5% |
| 1990 | 4,277 | +13.0% |
| 2000 | 4,116 | −3.8% |
| 2010 | 4,007 | −2.6% |
| 2020 | 3,884 | −3.1% |

== History ==
Nakatasunai was settled from around 1905. It was raised to village status in 1947.

== Government ==
Nakatasunai has a mayor-council form of government with a directly elected mayor and a unicameral village council of eight members. Nakatasunai, as part of Tokachi Subprefecture, contributes four members to the Hokkaidō Prefectural Assembly. In terms of national politics, the village is part of the Hokkaidō 11th district of the lower house of the Diet of Japan.

== Economy ==
The main industry is agriculture.

== Education ==
Nakasatsunai has two public elementary school sand one public middle school operated by the village. The village has one public high school operated by the Hokkaido Board of Education.

== Transportation ==
=== Railways ===
Nakasatsunai has not had passenger railway service since the discontinuation of the JR Hokkaido Hiroo Line in 1987. The nearest train station is Obihiro Station on the Nemuro Main Line

=== Highways ===
- Obihiro-Hiroo Expressway
- National Route 236

== Local attractions ==
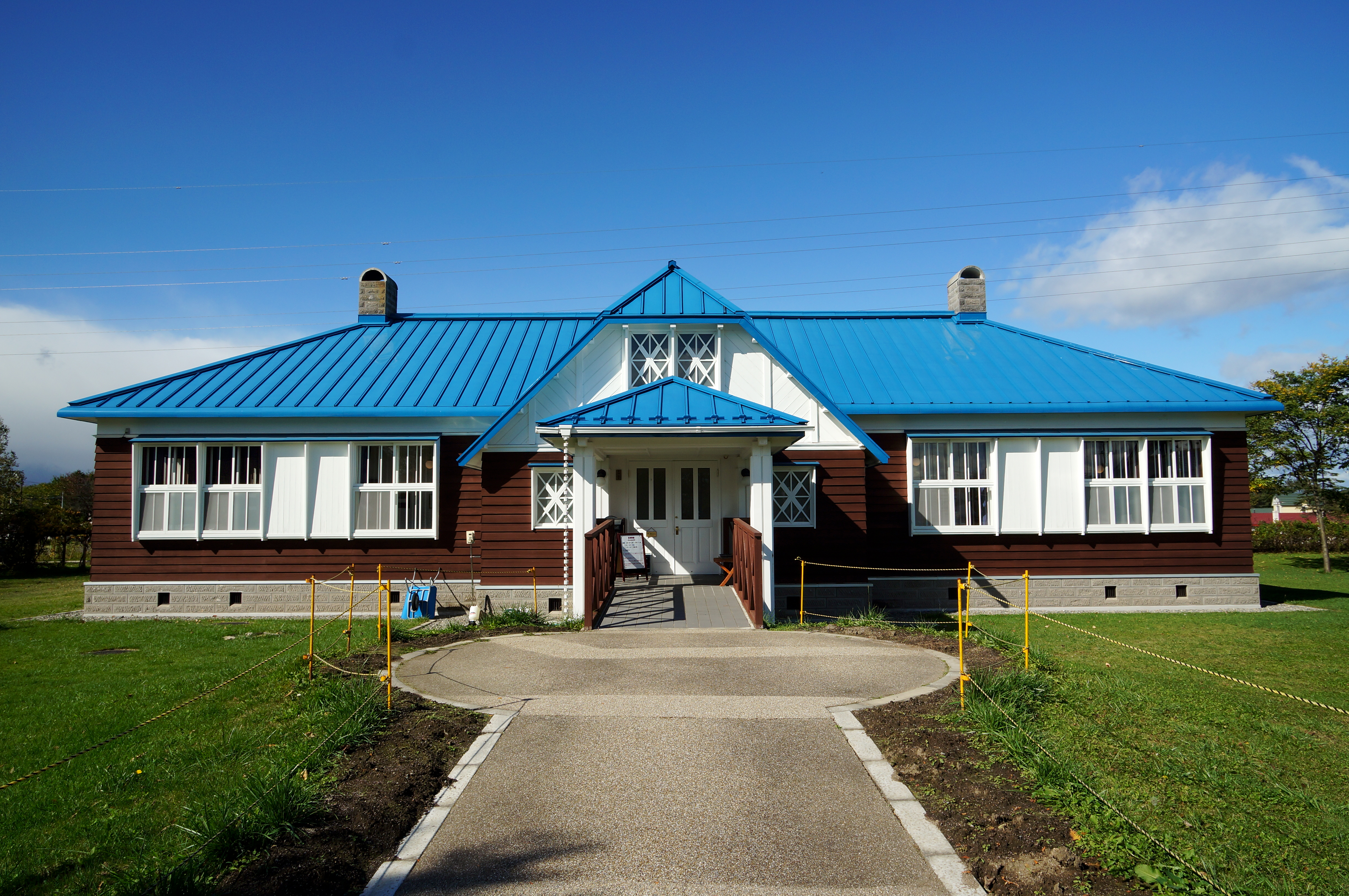
Ben Museum

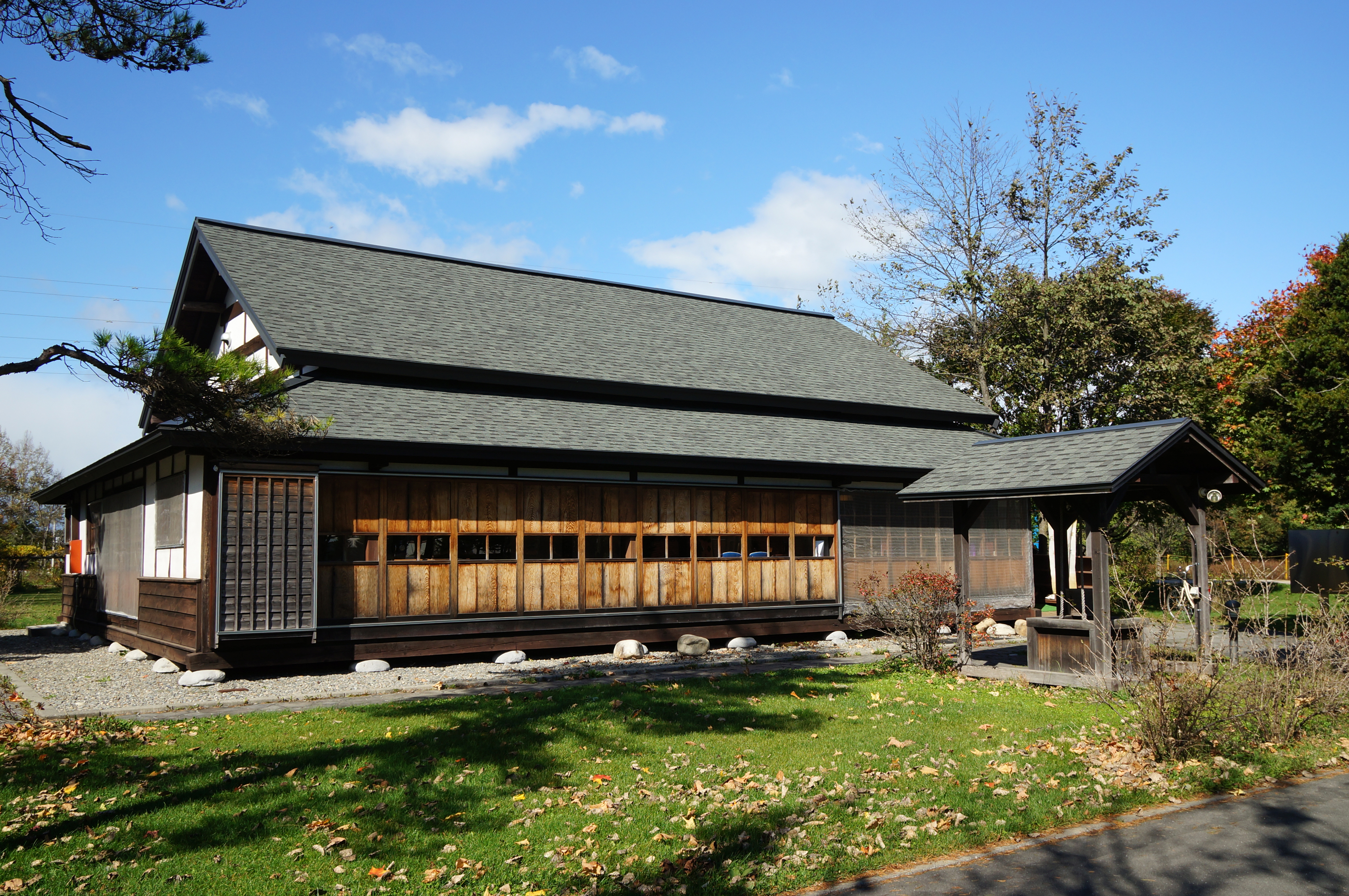
Pioneer Museum

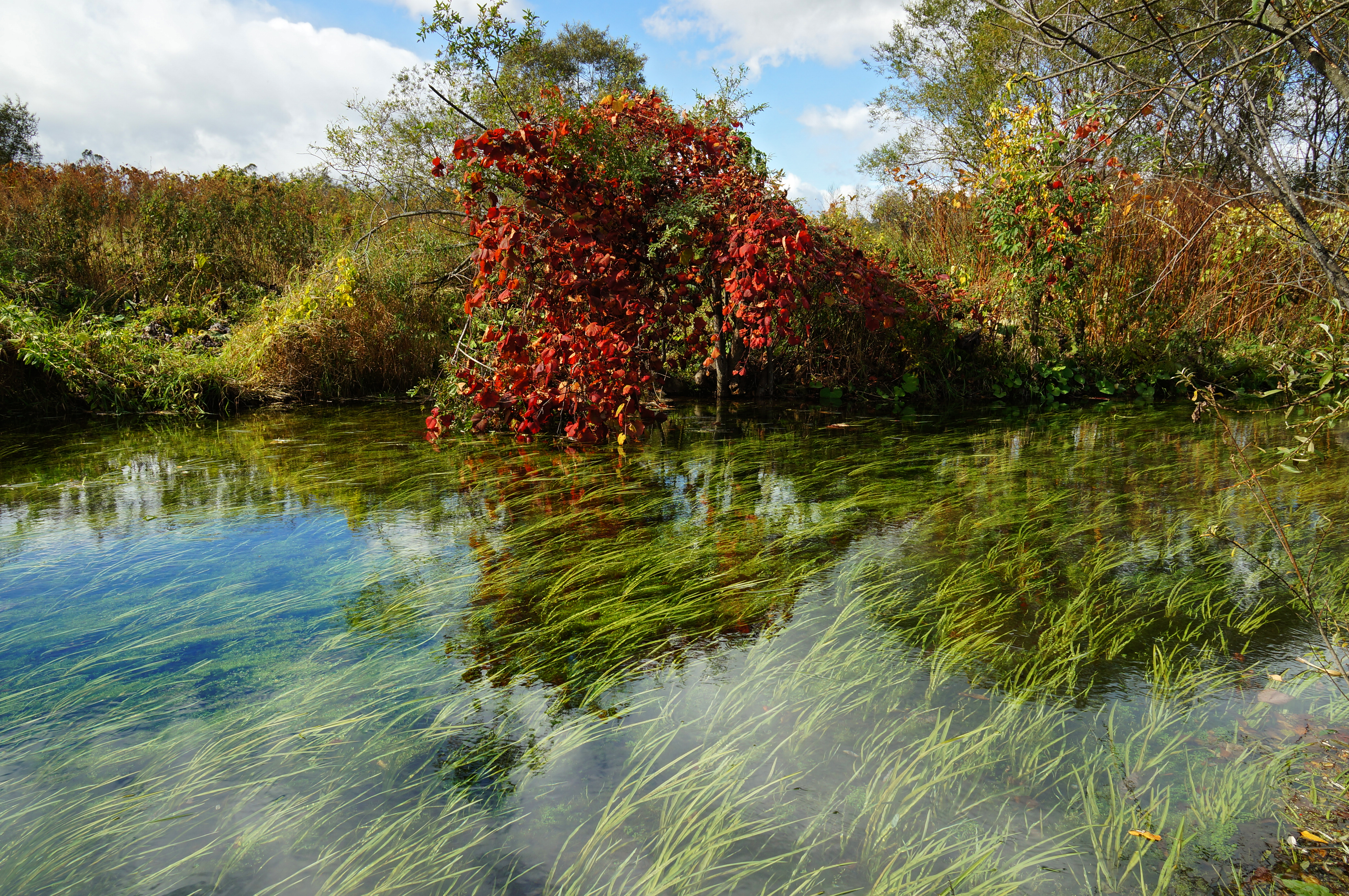
Rokka-no-Mori Park

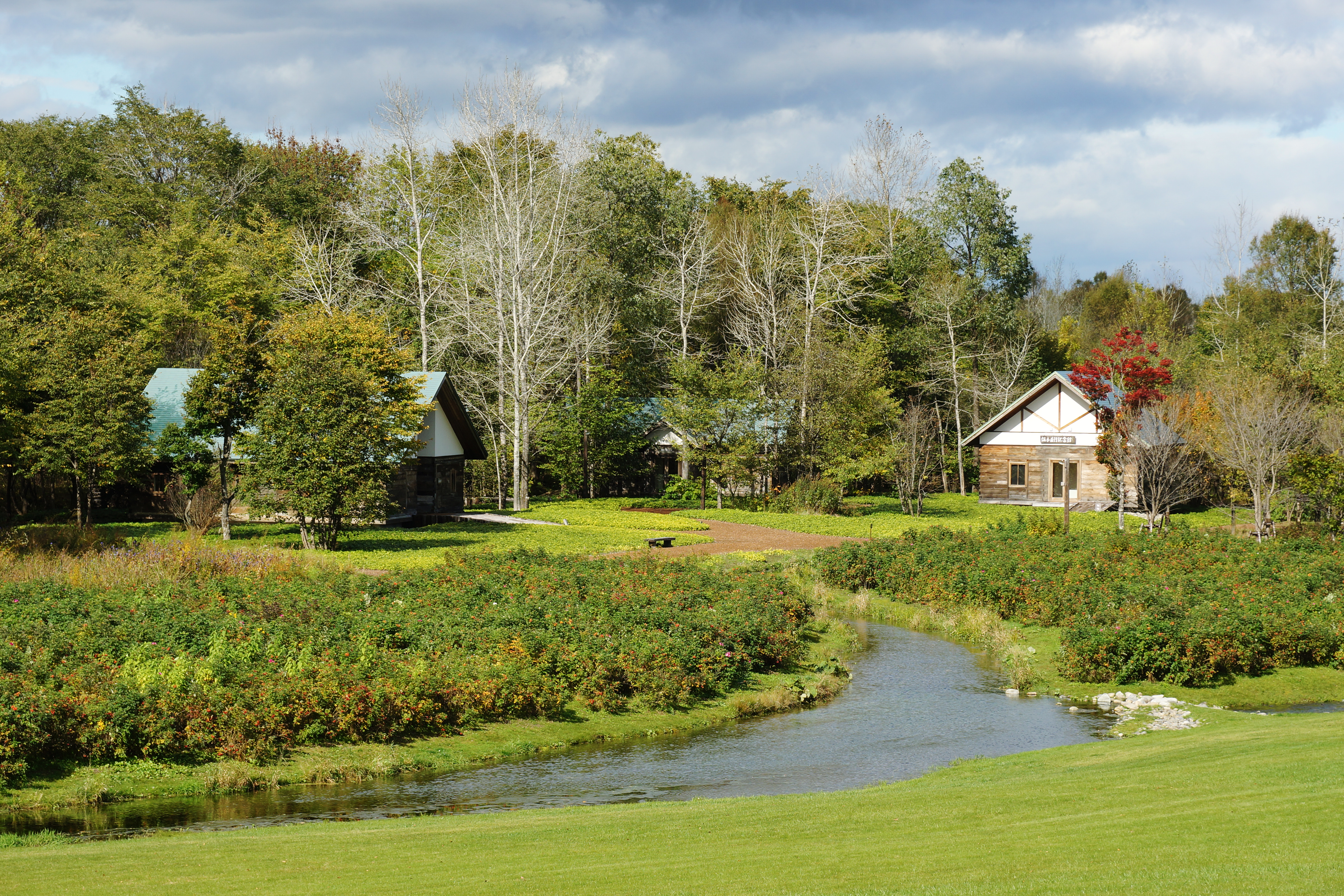
Tomohiro Momose Art Gallery, Sanban River, and Naoyuki Sakamoto Memorial Museum

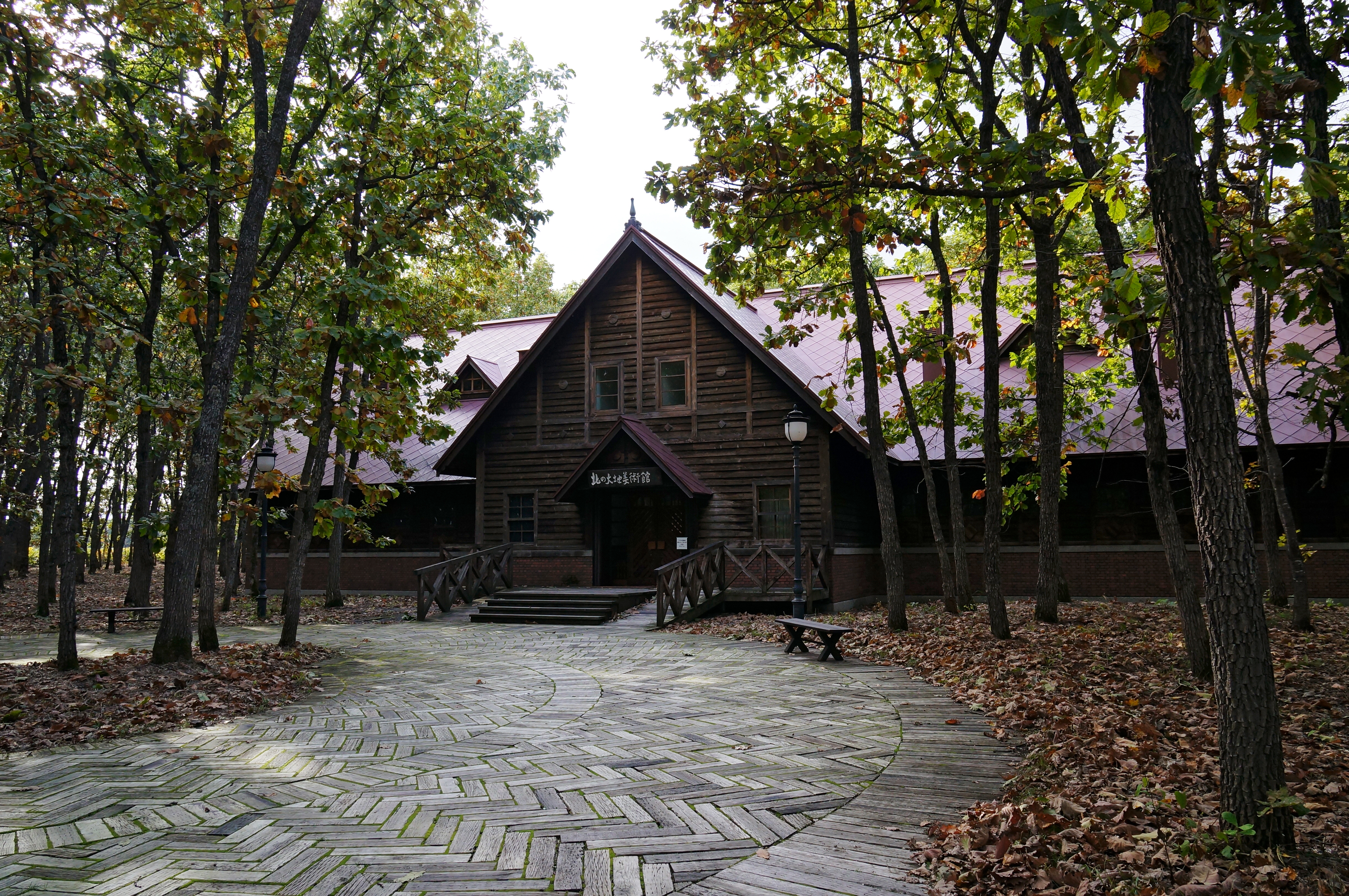
Kita no Daichi Art Museum

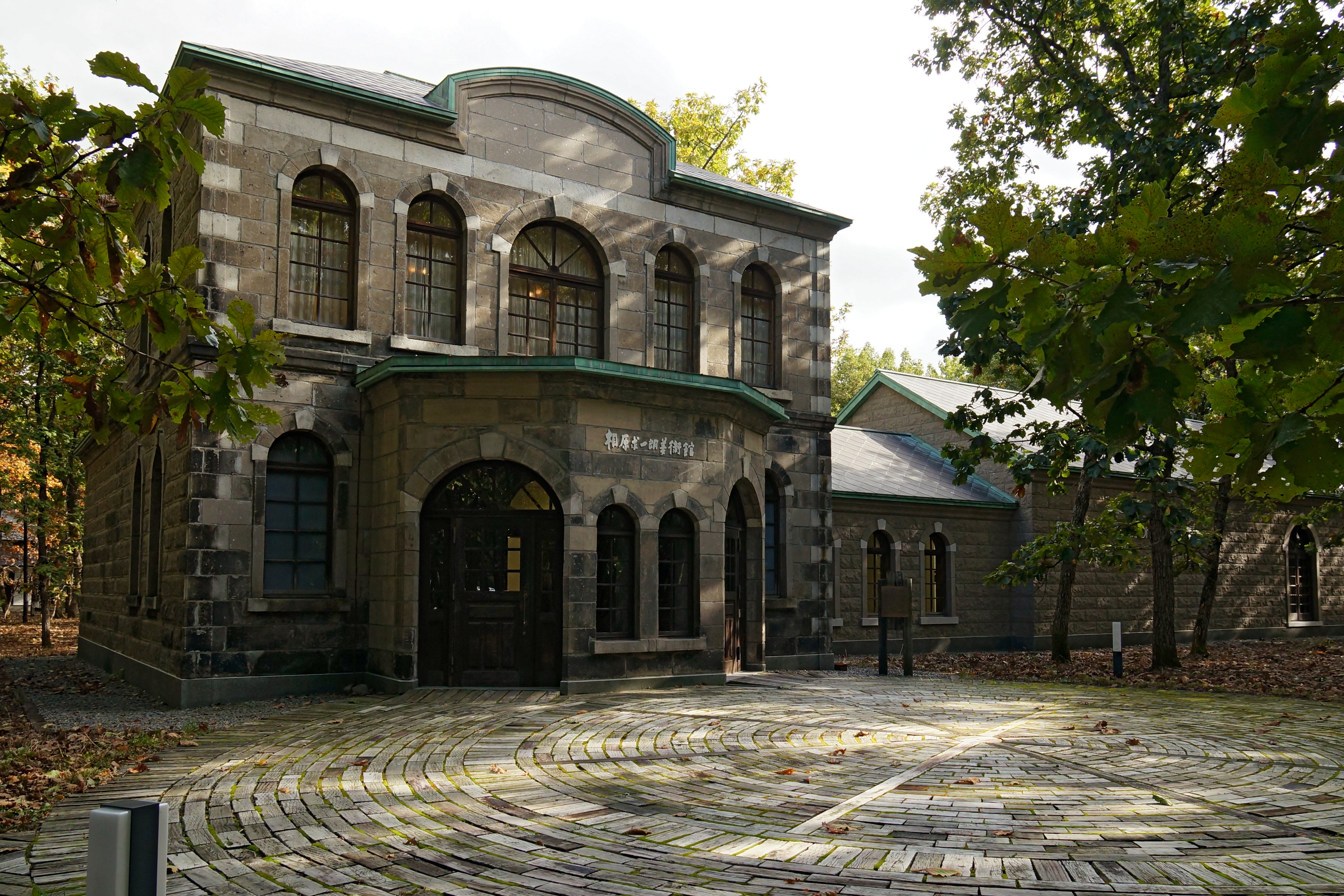
Aihara Kyuichiro Art Museum

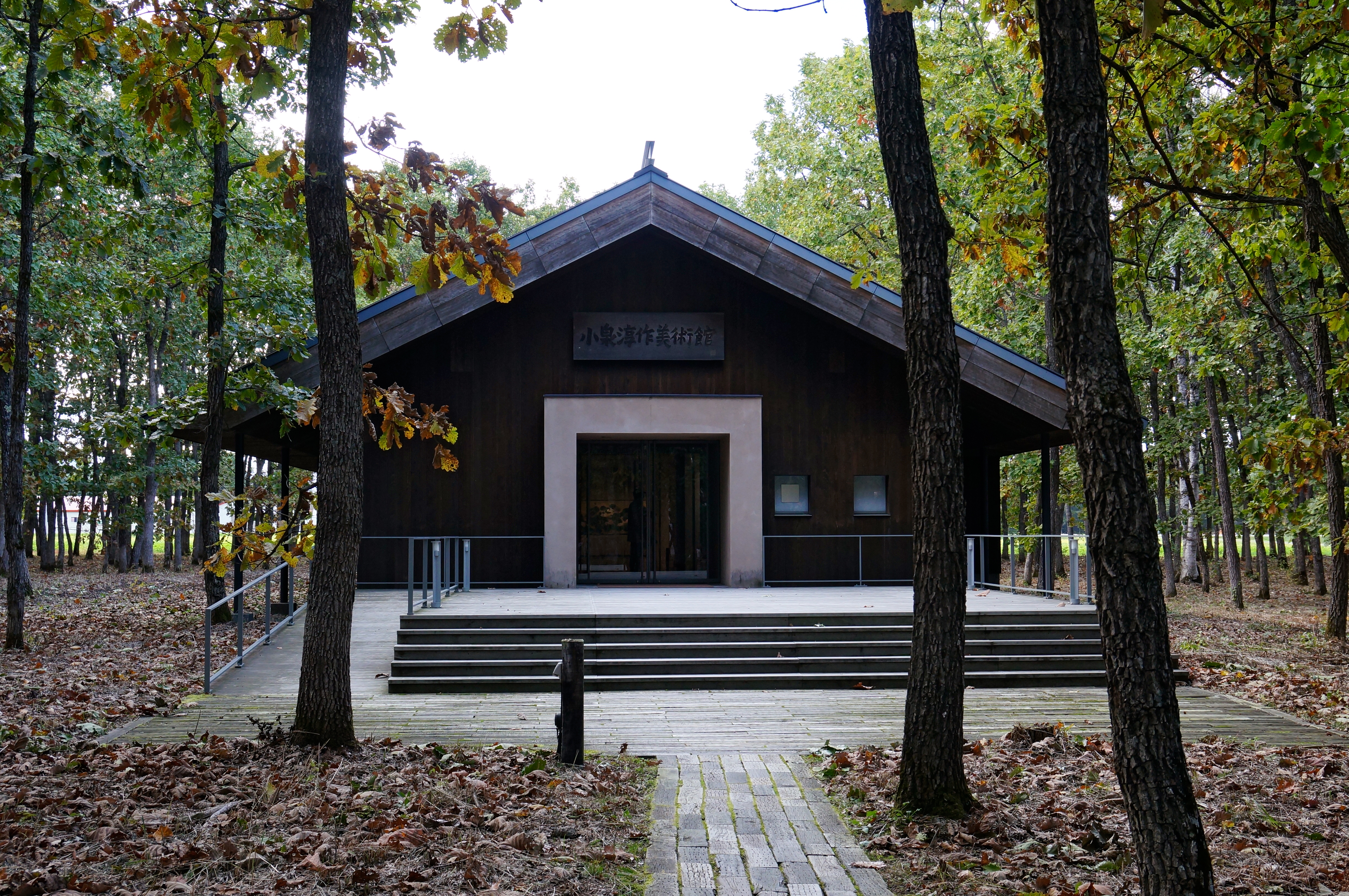
Koizumi Junsaku Art Museum

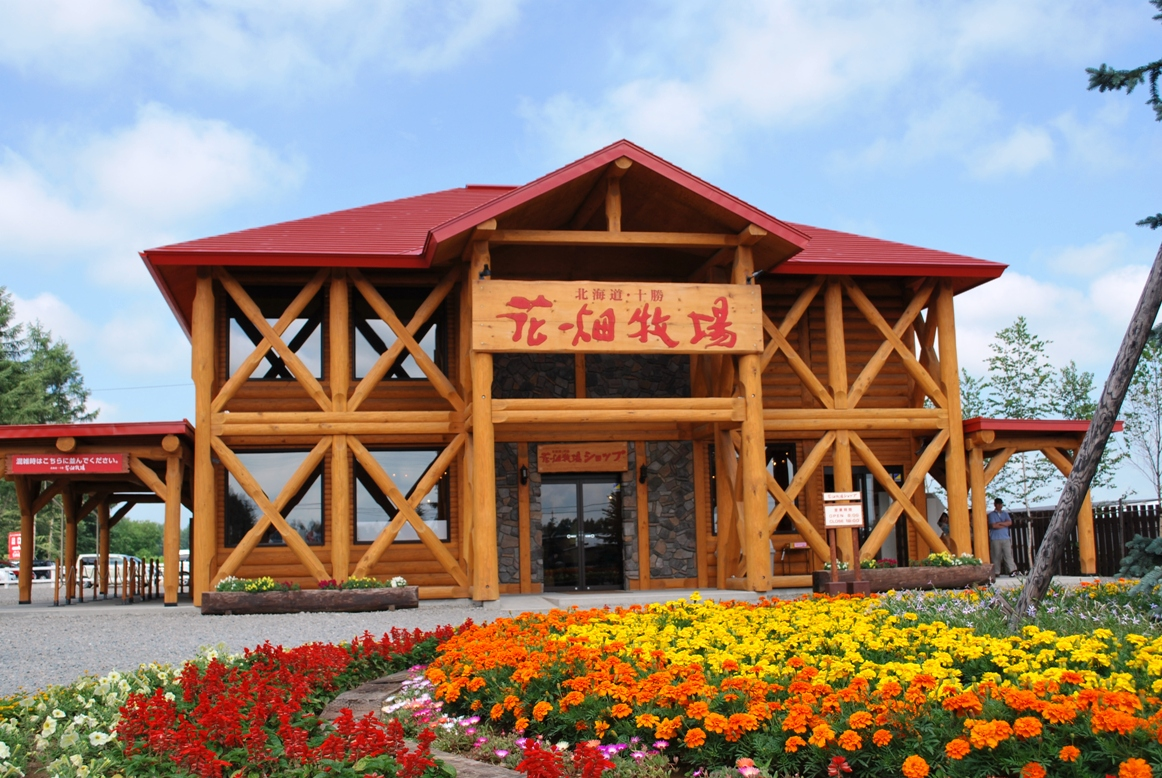
Hanabatake Farms

== Notable people from Nakasatsunai ==
- Shiho Ishizawa, speed skater
- Misaki Oshigiri, speed skater

== Mascot ==
Pi-tan, the town's mascot

Nakasatsunai's mascot is Pi-tan (ピータン). He is a baby chick. His face looks like an egg, his eyes are like beans, and his shoes are made of potatoes (these agricultural products are products of the town). Although he usually wears a top hat and carries a lily of the valley, he can change into other clothes. His favorite hobbies are climbing mountains, farming, judo and attending festivals. He was unveiled in March 1991.
