= Noboribetsu Marine Park Nixe =

Noboribetsu marine park nixe (登別マリンパークニクス)
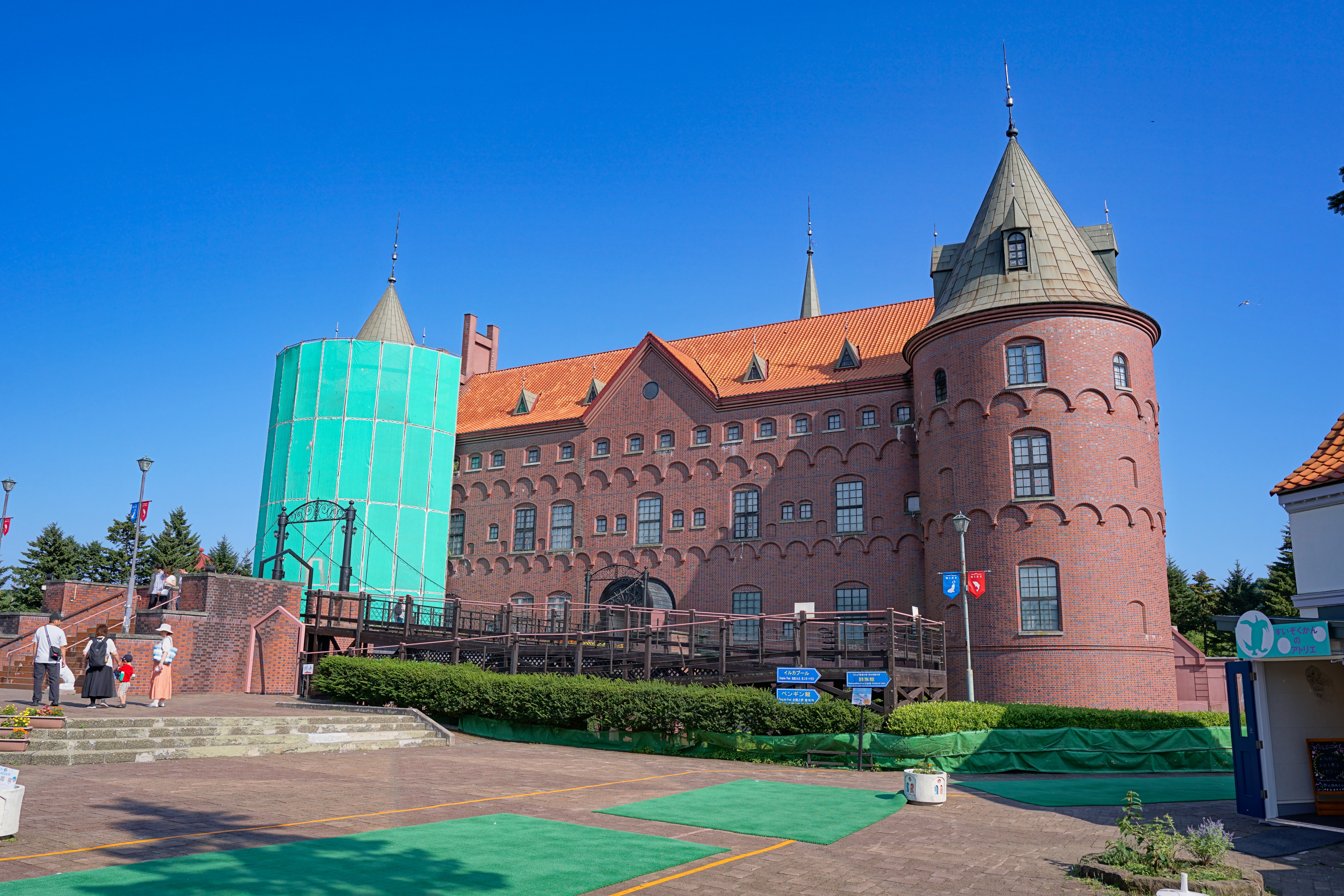
- Noboribetsu Marine Park Nixe
- Interactive map of Noboribetsu marine park nixe (登別マリンパークニクス)
- 42.454972°N 141.182194°E
- Date opened: July 20, 1990
- Location: Noboribetsu, Hokkaido, Japan
- Land area: 10,576 m^{2} (113,840 sq ft)
- No. of animals: 20,000
- No. of species: 400
- Volume of largest tank: A 620,000 litres (164,000 US gal) warm current tank and a 300,000 litres (79,000 US gal) cold current tank
- Total volume of tanks: 3,000,000 litres (793,000 US gal)
- Annual visitors: 250,000
- Memberships: JAZA
- Major exhibits: Two Shark Tunnels
- Management: Kamori Kanko
- Website: https://en.nixe.co.jp/

Noboribetsu Marine Park Nixe (登別マリンパークニクス, Noboribetsu marinpāku nikusu) is a Japanese public aquarium located in Noboribetsu, Hokkaido, Japan. It is the one of largest aquariums in Hokkaido, with several buildings constructed around a copy of Egeskov Castle. It is a member of the Japanese Association of Zoos and Aquariums (JAZA) and the aquarium is accredited as a Museum-equivalent facility by the Museum Act from the Ministry of Education, Culture, Sports, Science and Technology.

== History ==
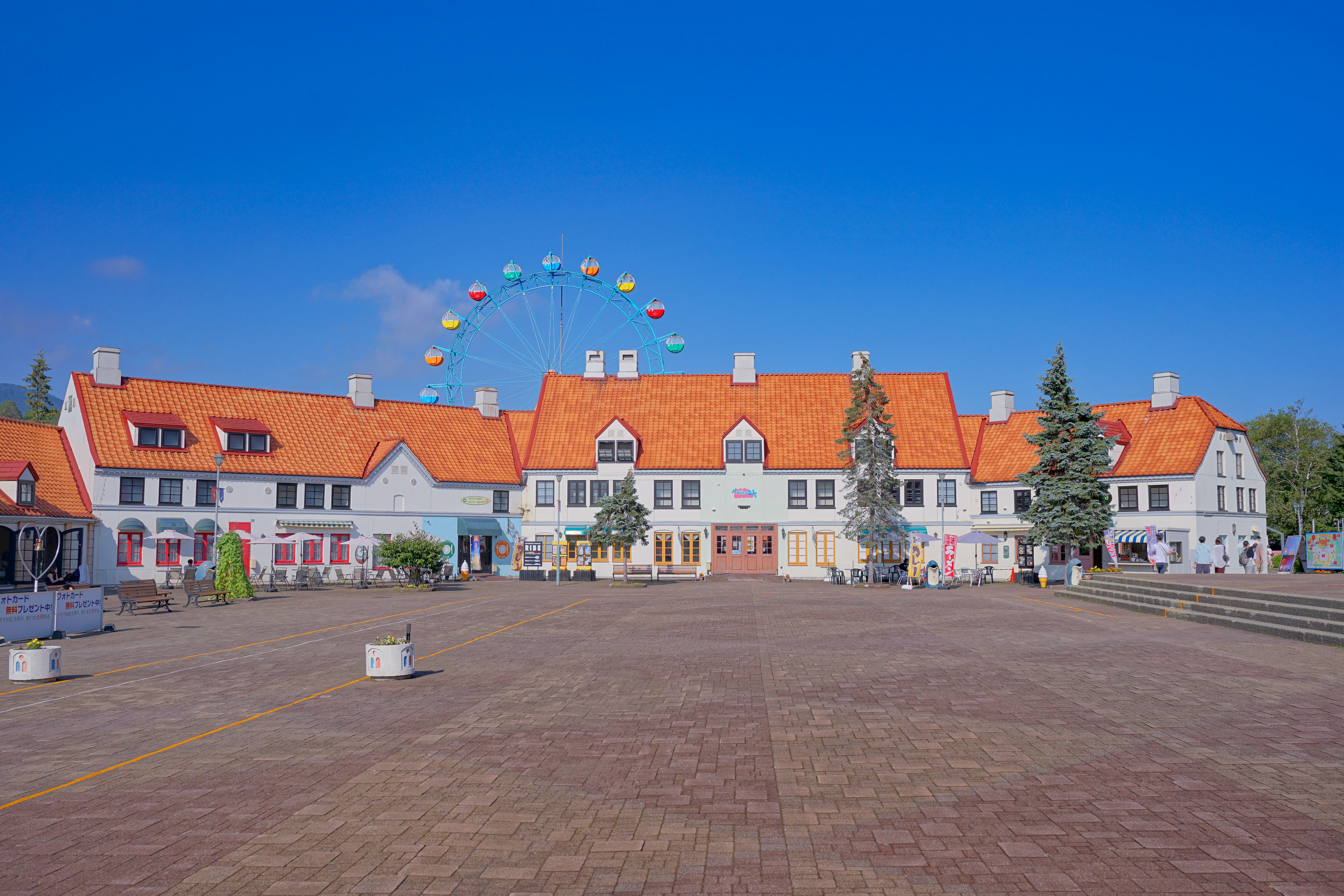
Cityscape inside the facility

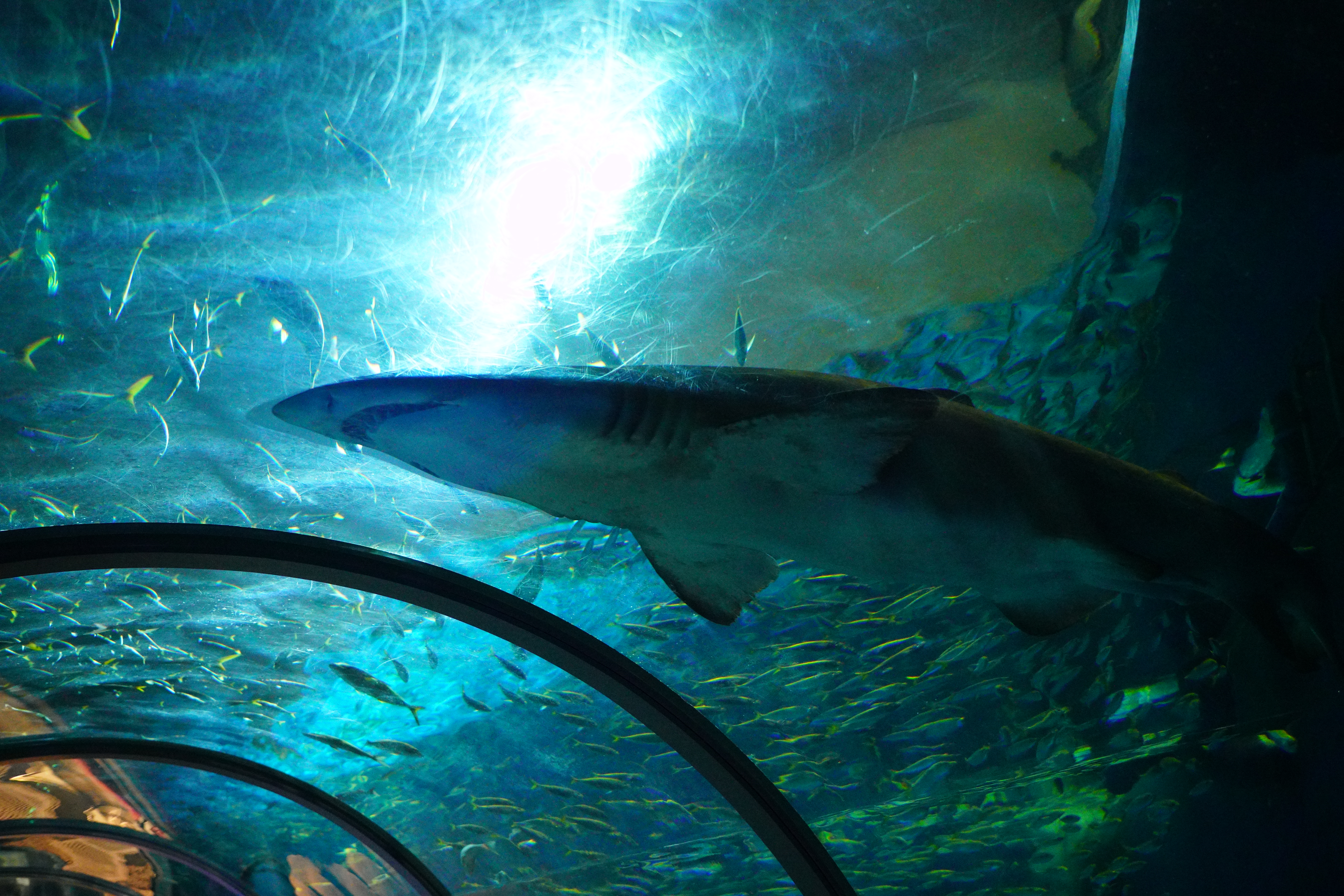
The shark tunnel tank is made by connecting a warm water tank and a cold water tank, with a total water volume of 920,000 litres (243,000 US gal).

To establish the largest aquarium in Hokkaido, the city government of Noboribetsu established a third-sector company as the main operator with investment from 42 local companies. The aquarium was opened on July 20, 1990, at a total project cost of approximately 7.3 billion yen.

In the first month of its opening, approximately 230,000 people visited the museum. For the first two years of its opening, it attracted more than 600,000 visitors per year.

However, from the third year of operation onwards, the number of visitors rapidly dropped due to the economic downturn caused by the bursting of the bubble economy and the loss of popularity. As a result, in 1997, the private company withdrew, leaving Noboribetsu City virtually holding the entire operation.

As a result, "Hokkaido Marine Park," the operating body of the park, fell into a business crisis with accumulated debts of approximately 4.03 billion yen as of January 2001. The same month, Noboribetsu City, Kamori Kanko, and Hokkaido Marine Park signed a memorandum of understanding to transfer management rights of the marine park to Kamori Kanko.

Under this restructuring plan, Kamori Kanko became the largest shareholder by transferring the 25% stake (100 million yen investment) owned by Noboribetsu City without compensation, and "Hokkaido Marine Park" became a private company from the third sector.

Then, Noboribetsu City acquired the park's building for approximately 800 million yen and leased it free of charge for 10 years, which effectively exempted Noboribetsu City from paying property tax, and "Hokkaido Marine Park" became free of property tax and building The "Hokkaido Marine Park" was no longer burdened with property taxes and building depreciation.

After the park became a subsidiary of Kamori Kanko, the number of visitors was estimated at 250,000 to 300,000 per year, and the number of employees was reduced to make the park profitable at that level. As of July 2012, the number of employees was reduced to 28 full-time employees and 50 part-time employees, or about one-fourth of the original staff, reducing costs.

== Facility ==
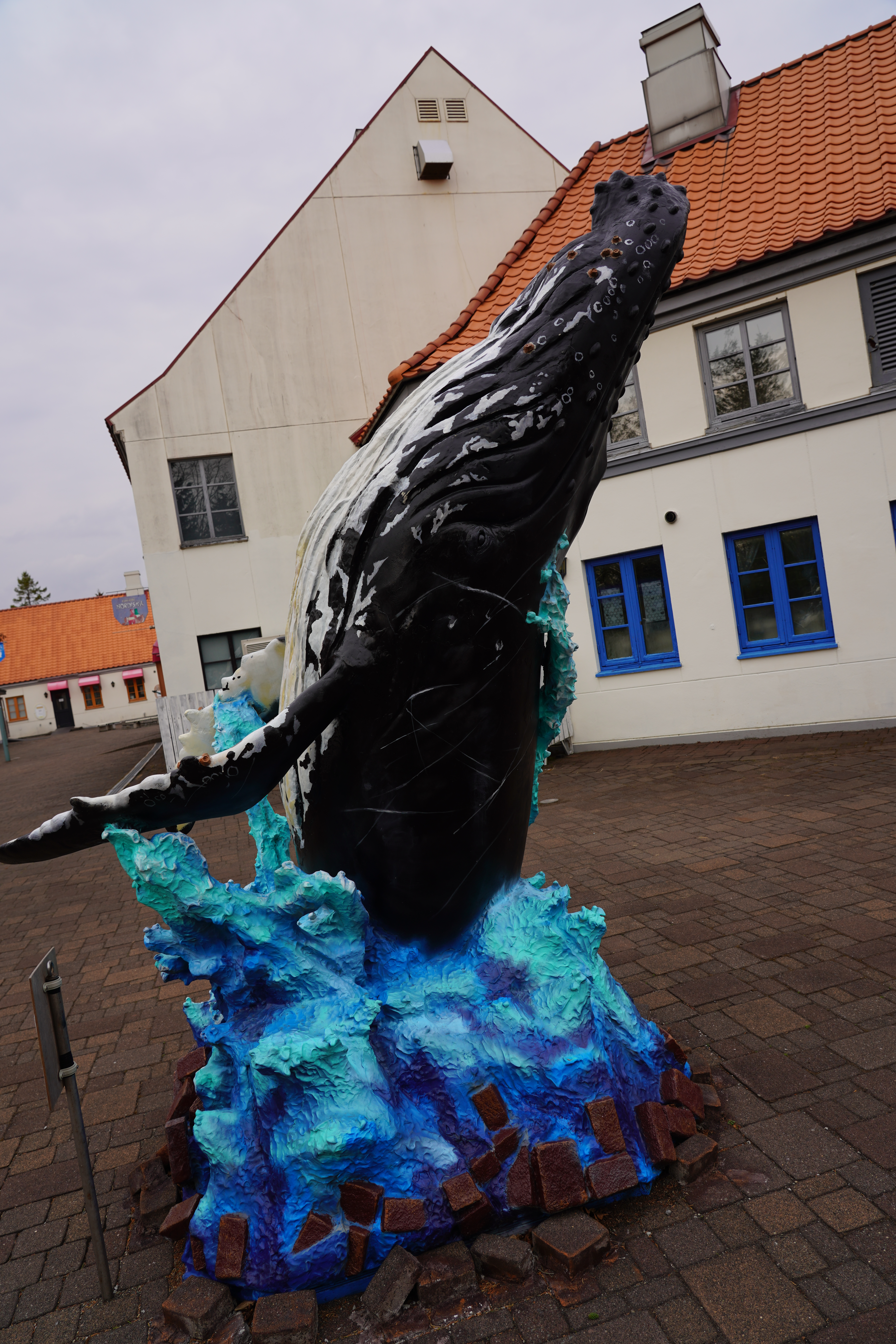
Several sculptures handmade by the keepers are located throughout the facility.

- Nixe Castle.

Inside, there are four floors, an aquarium. At the entrance, there is an 8 metres (26 ft) high crystal tower tank and two shark tunnels, one for cold-zone fish and the other for warm-zone fish. The two tanks are next to each other and can be viewed from above by escalators. The building was modeled after Denmark's Egeskov Castle.

- Dolphin show pool
- sea lion show pool
- sealring pool: newly built after privatization.
- Penguin pavilion.

The parade is held throughout the year, and the penguins that parade differ depending on the season. (King penguin, gentoo penguin, and Cape penguin)

- Riku-zoku-kan: newly established after privatization.
- Amusement park "Nixland".

Cash playground equipment including a Ferris wheel, merry-go-round, whale train, poltergeist pavilion, battery cars, etc.

== Research and conservation ==
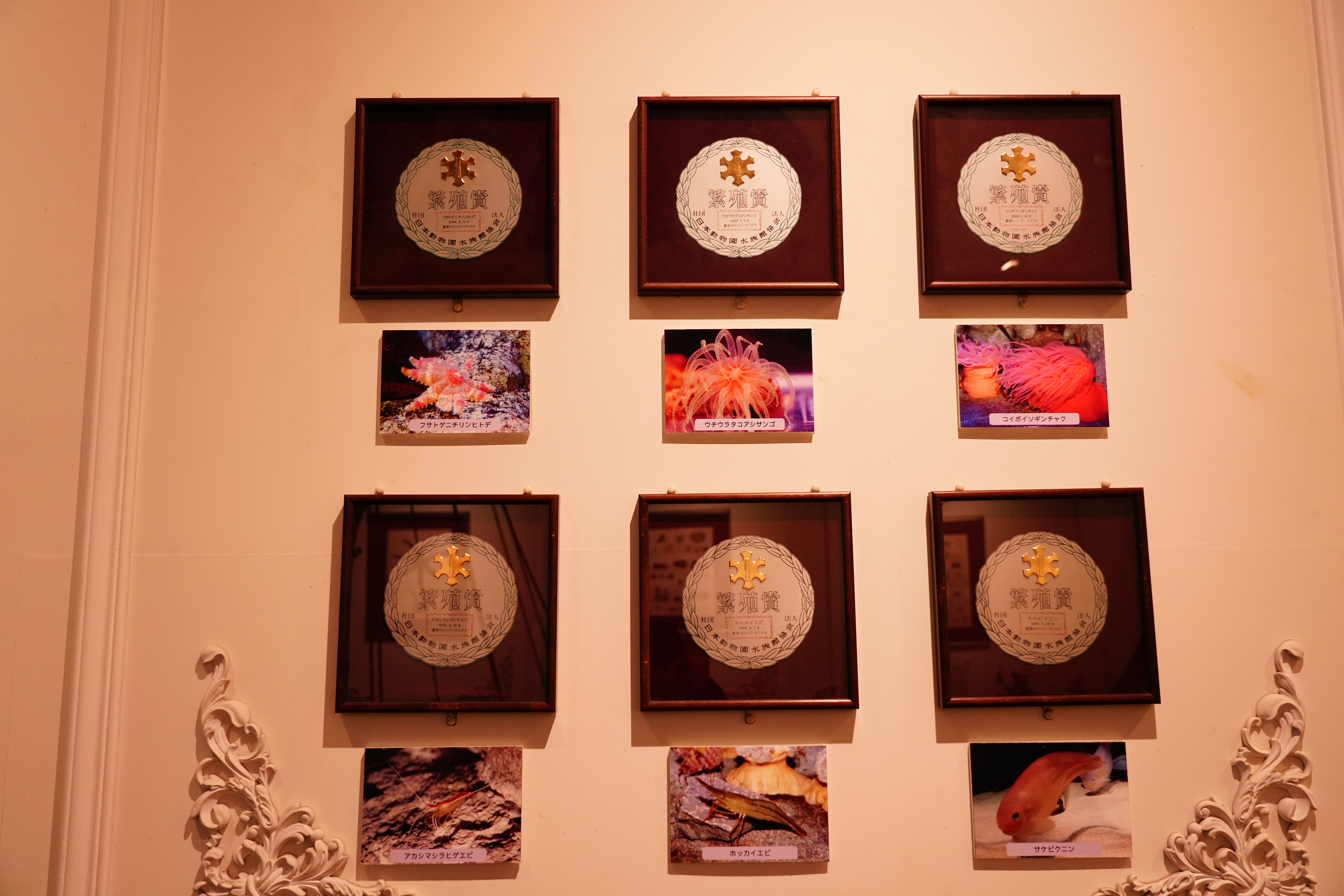
breeding award from JAZA

The aquarium is committed to captive breeding of organisms, and in the past has successfully new bred 10 species and received a breeding award from JAZA.

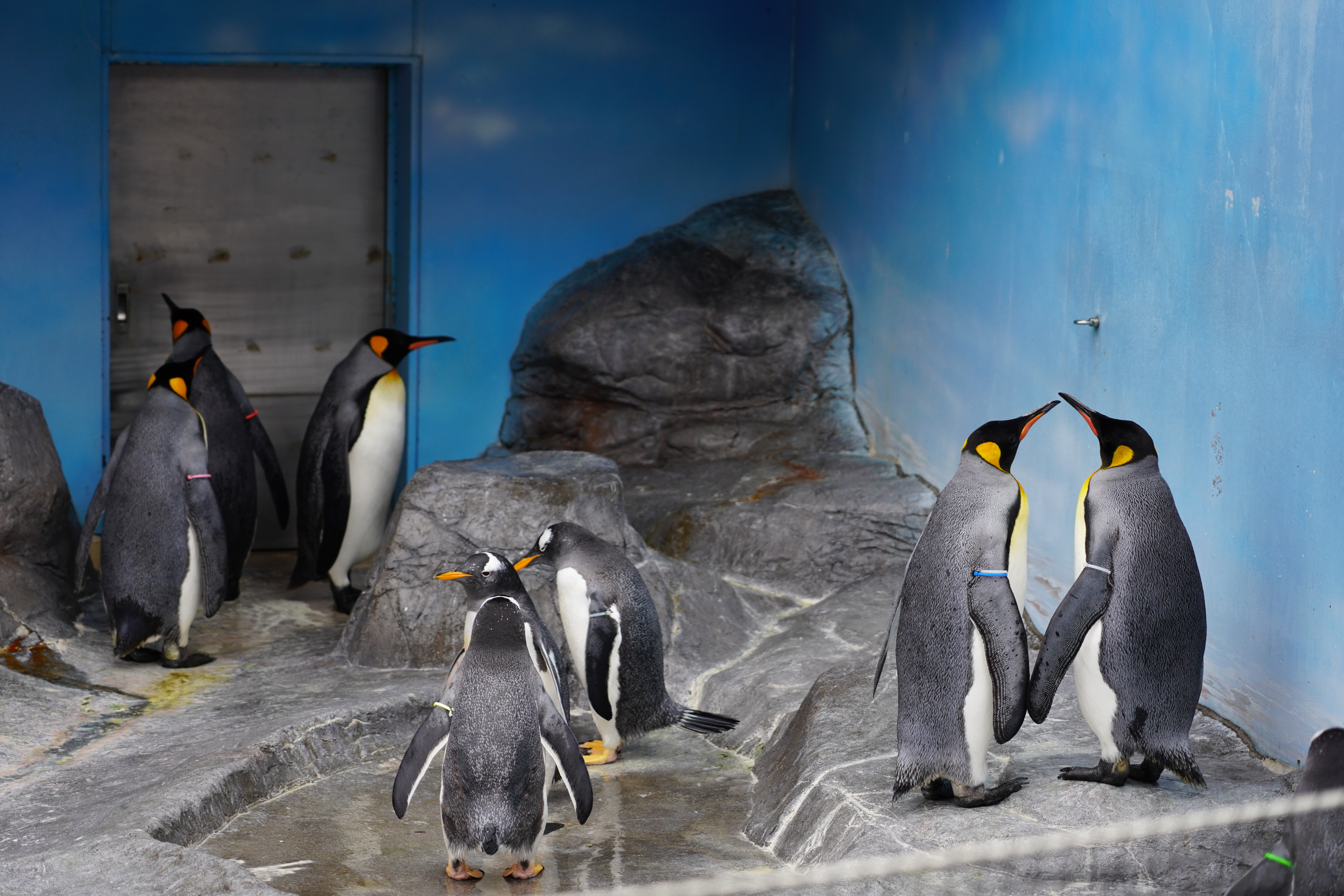
Penguins at Noboribetsu Marine Park Nixe

In 2021, a joint research team at the Noboribetsu Marine Park Nixe, Azabu University and Obihiro University of Agriculture and Veterinary Medicine elucidated pathological changes in individuals that lead to early detection of avian aspergillosis, a respiratory disease that penguins are particularly susceptible to and has been considered difficult to treat, and published their research results on diagnosis and treatment by CT scan in the Official Journal of the Japanese Society of Veterinary Science, an academic journal. This research received the 2021 Japanese Society of Wildlife Medicine Best Paper Award.

== Other events ==
At Noboribetsu Beach Park, the front garden of Noboribetsu Marine Park Nixe, a two-day festival called Waku Waku Square Noboribetsu is held every July.

== Gallery ==
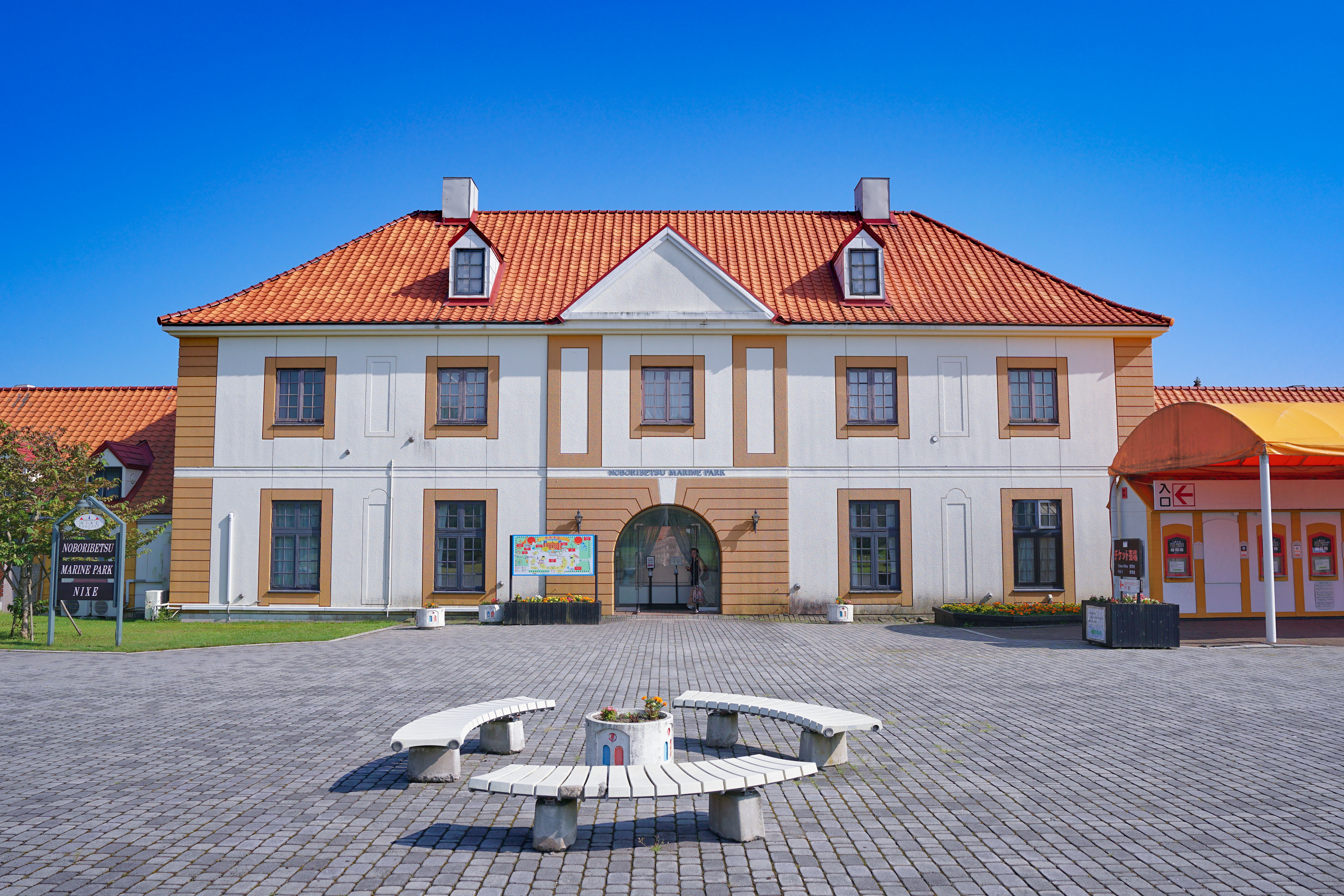

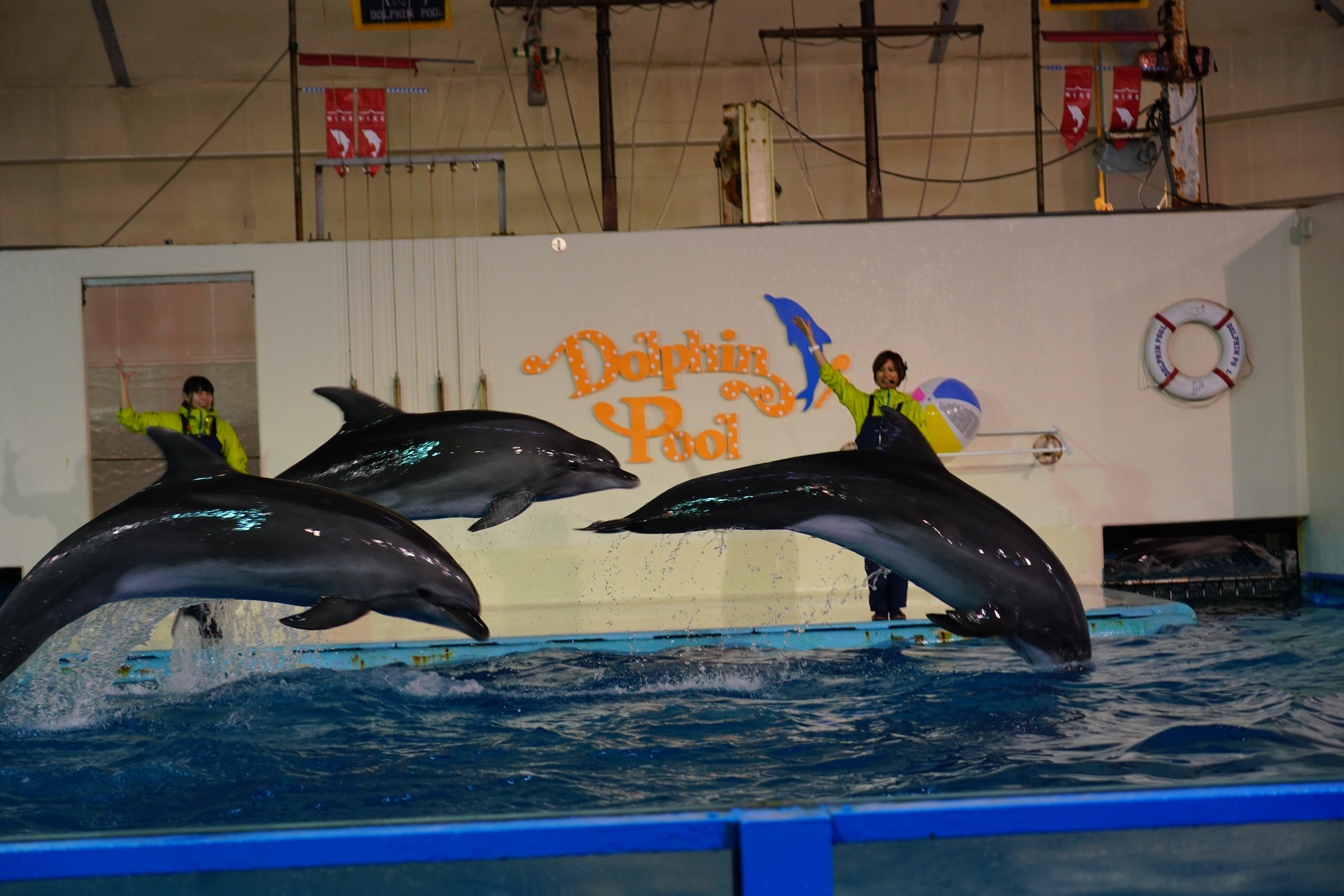

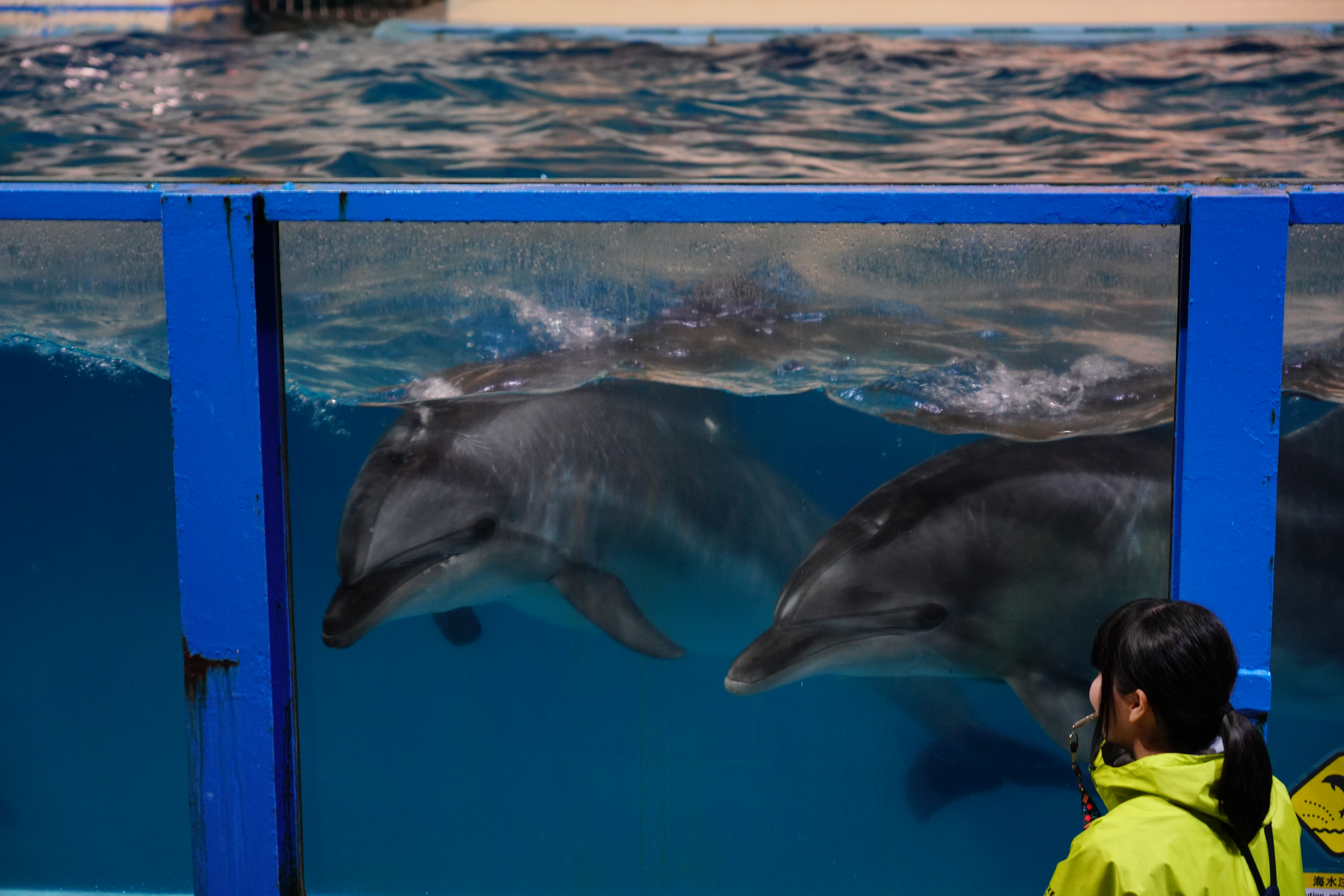

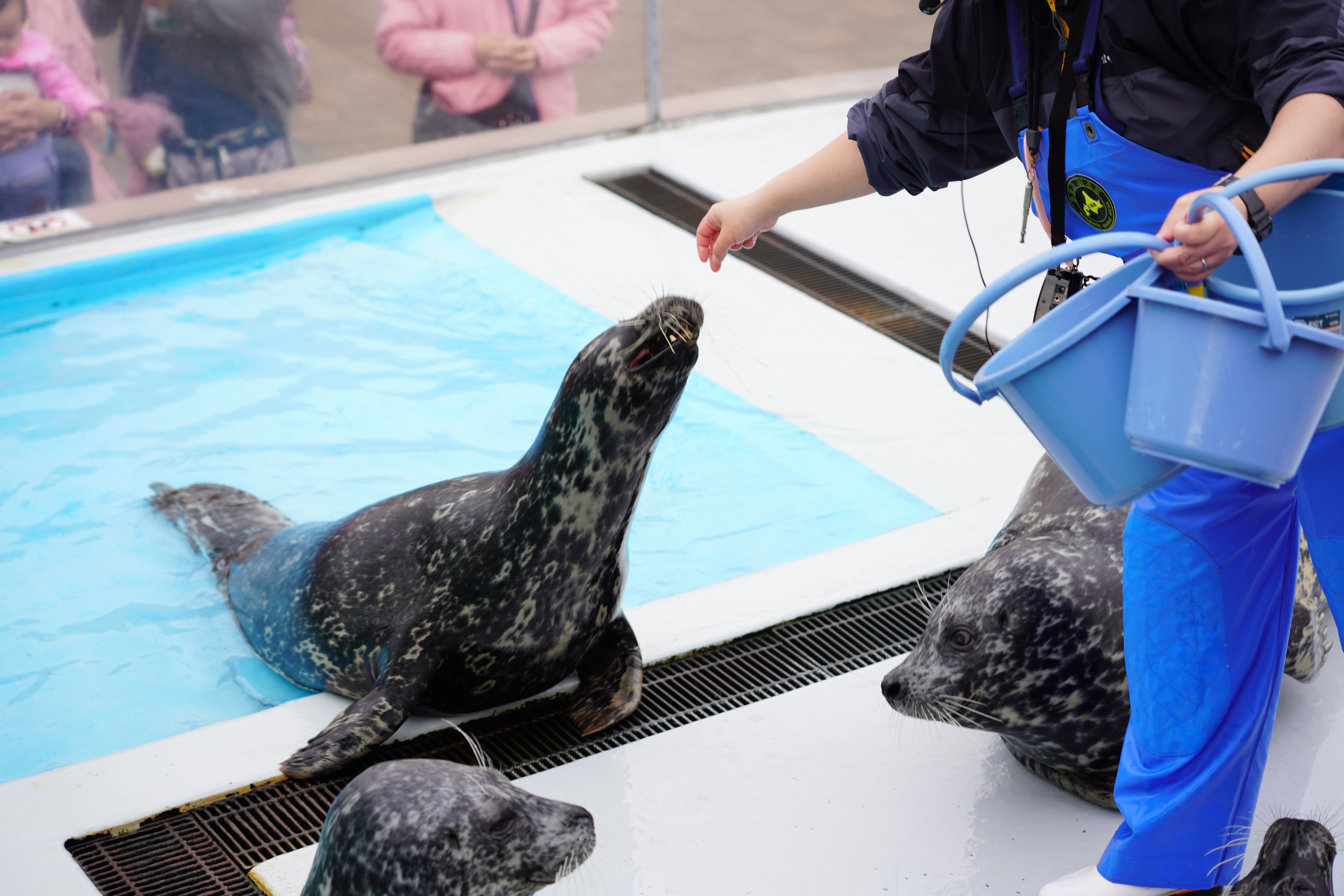

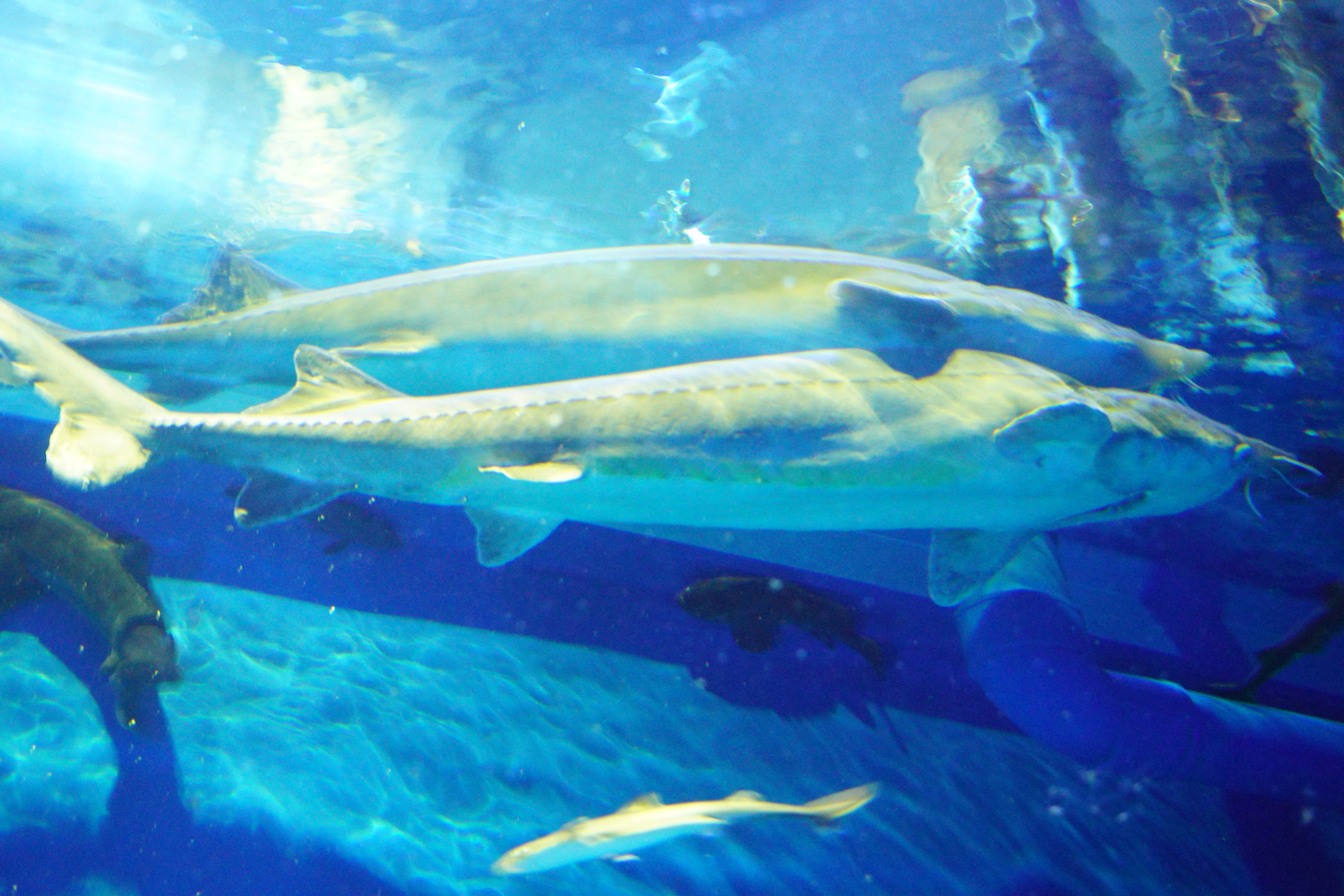

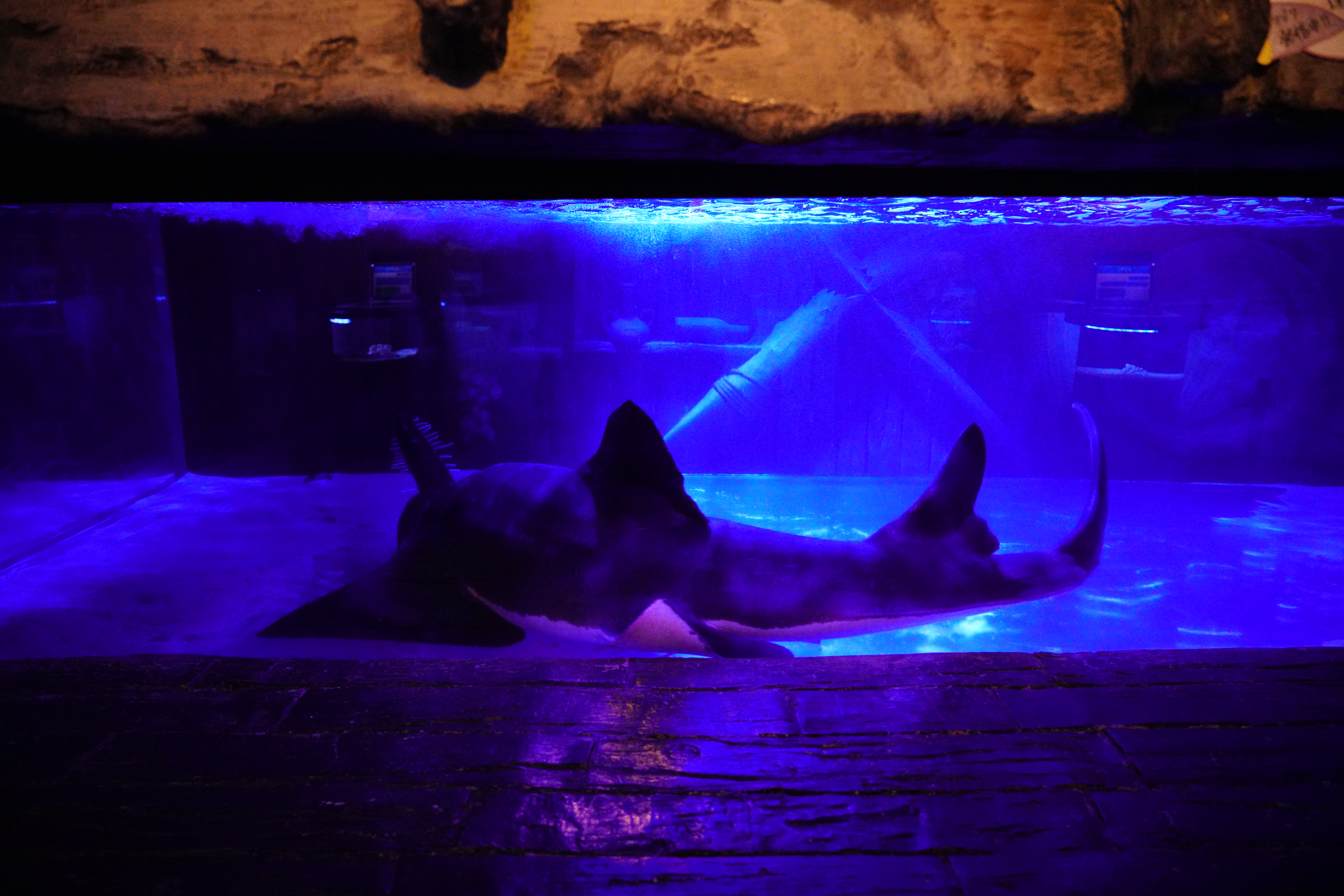

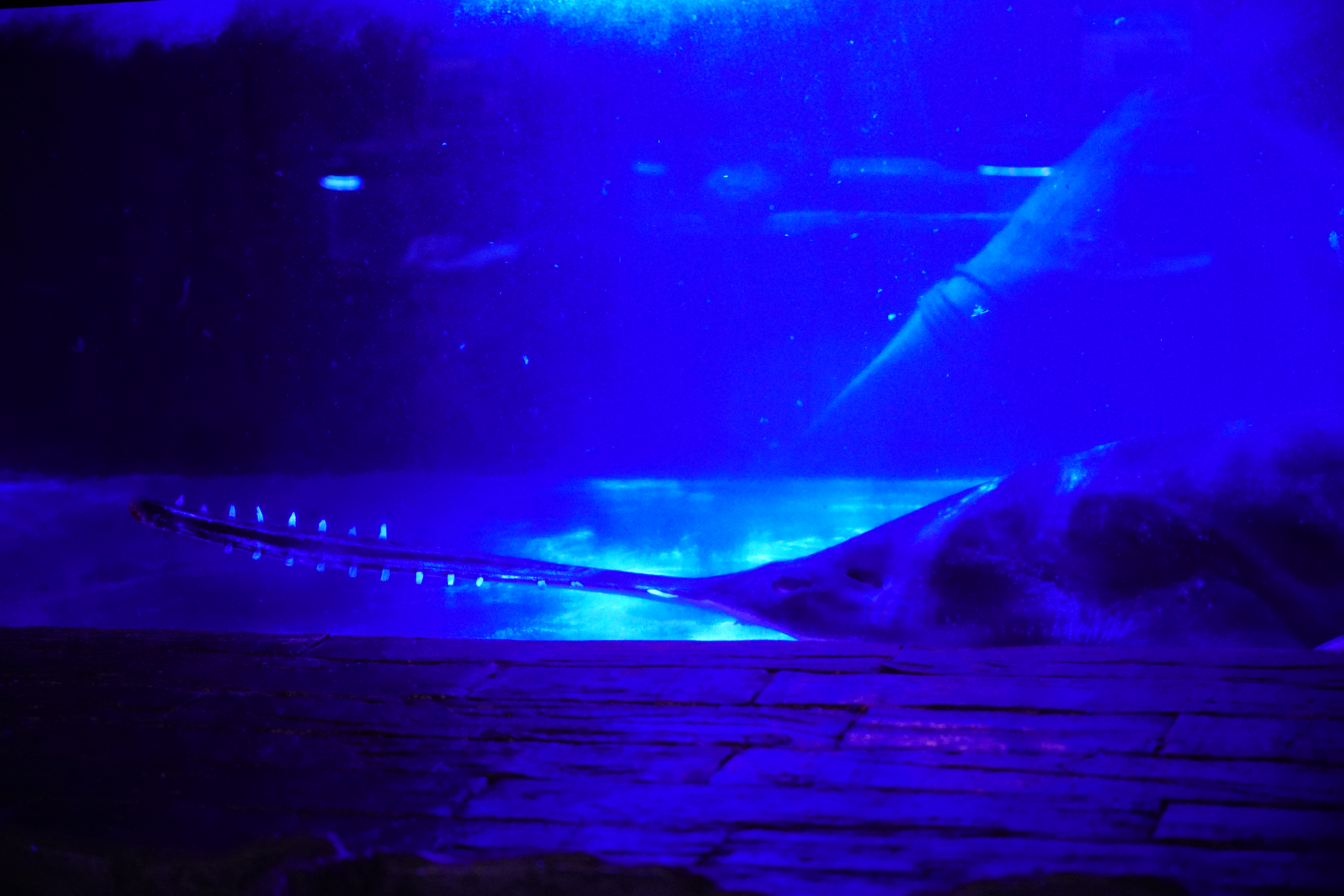

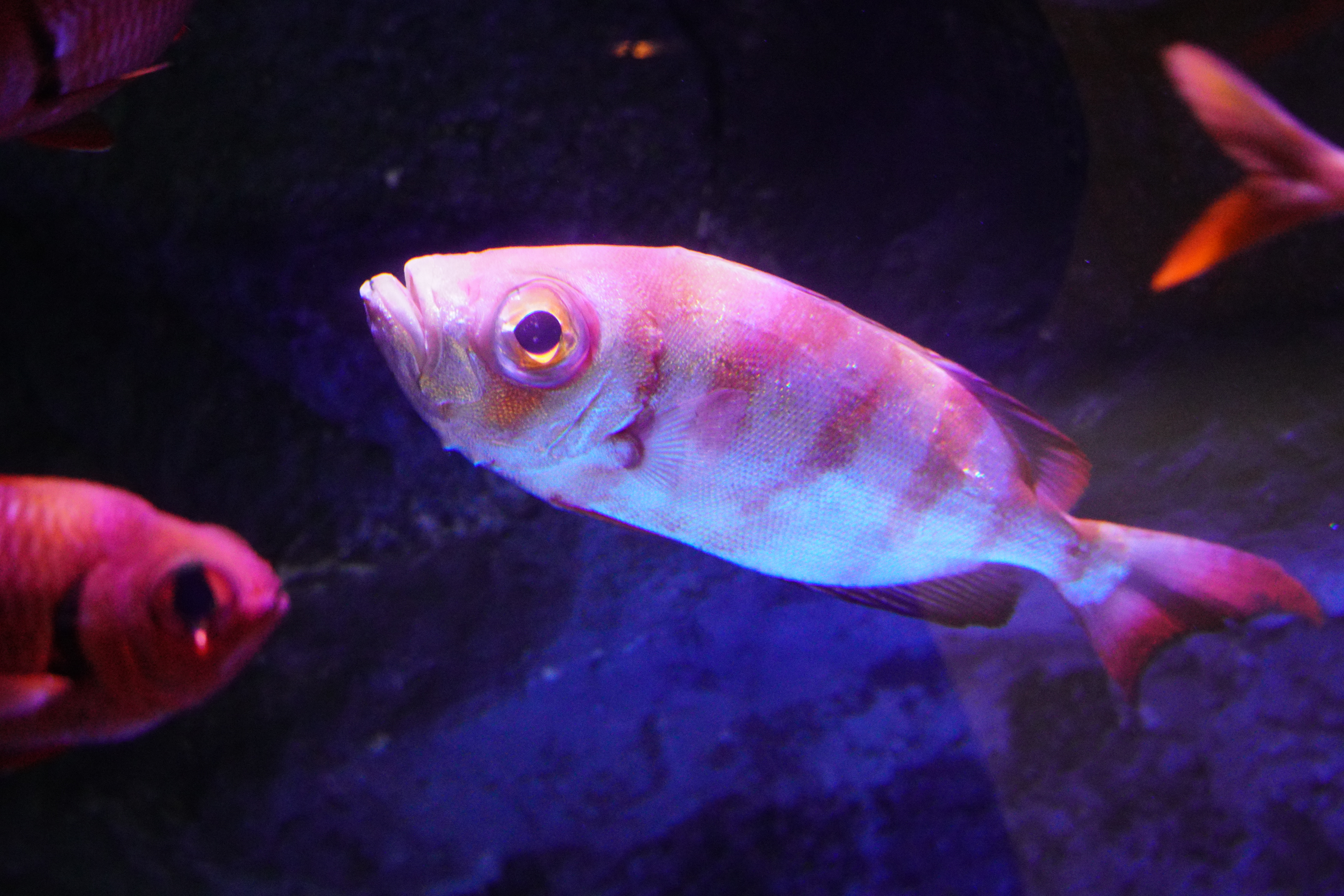

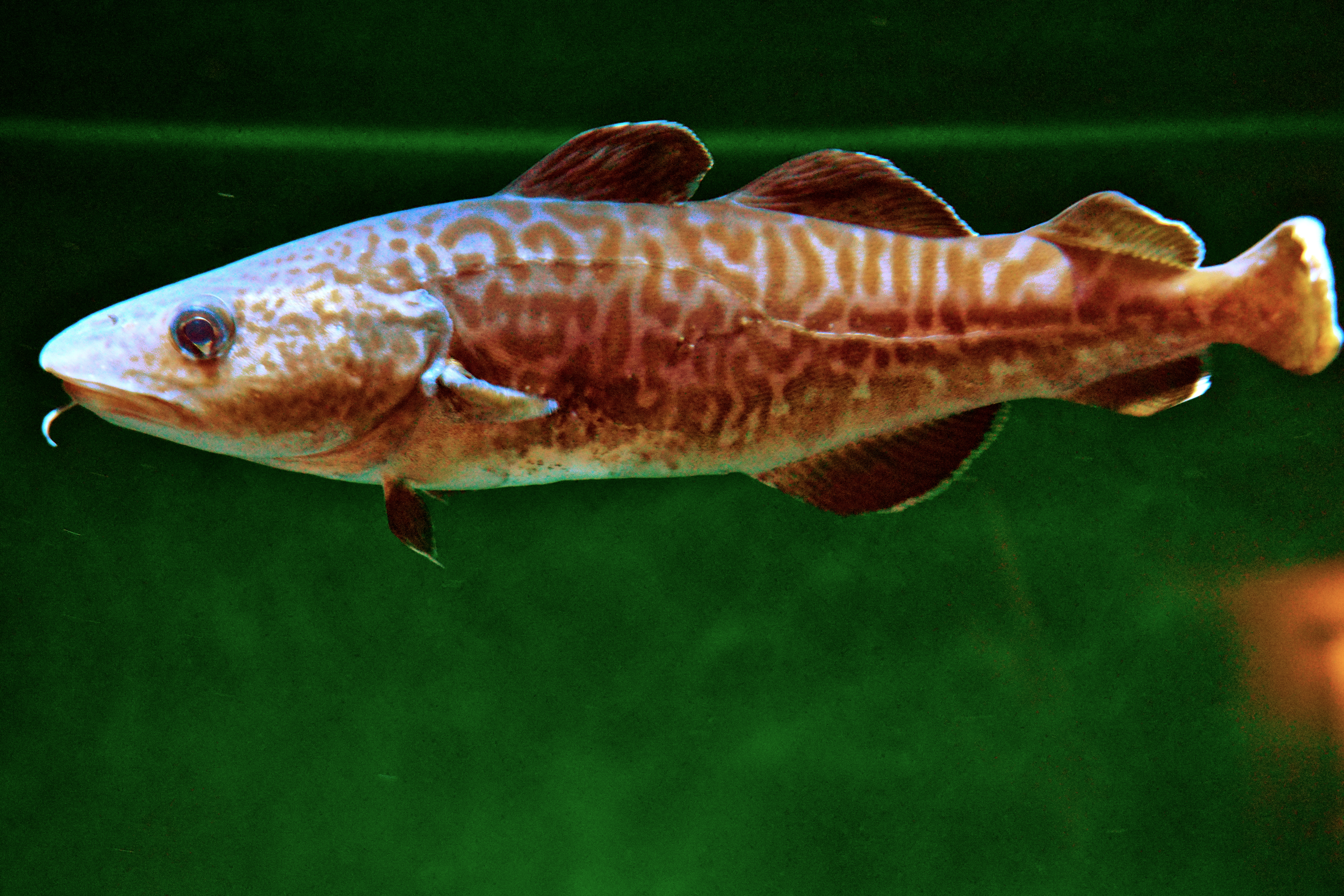

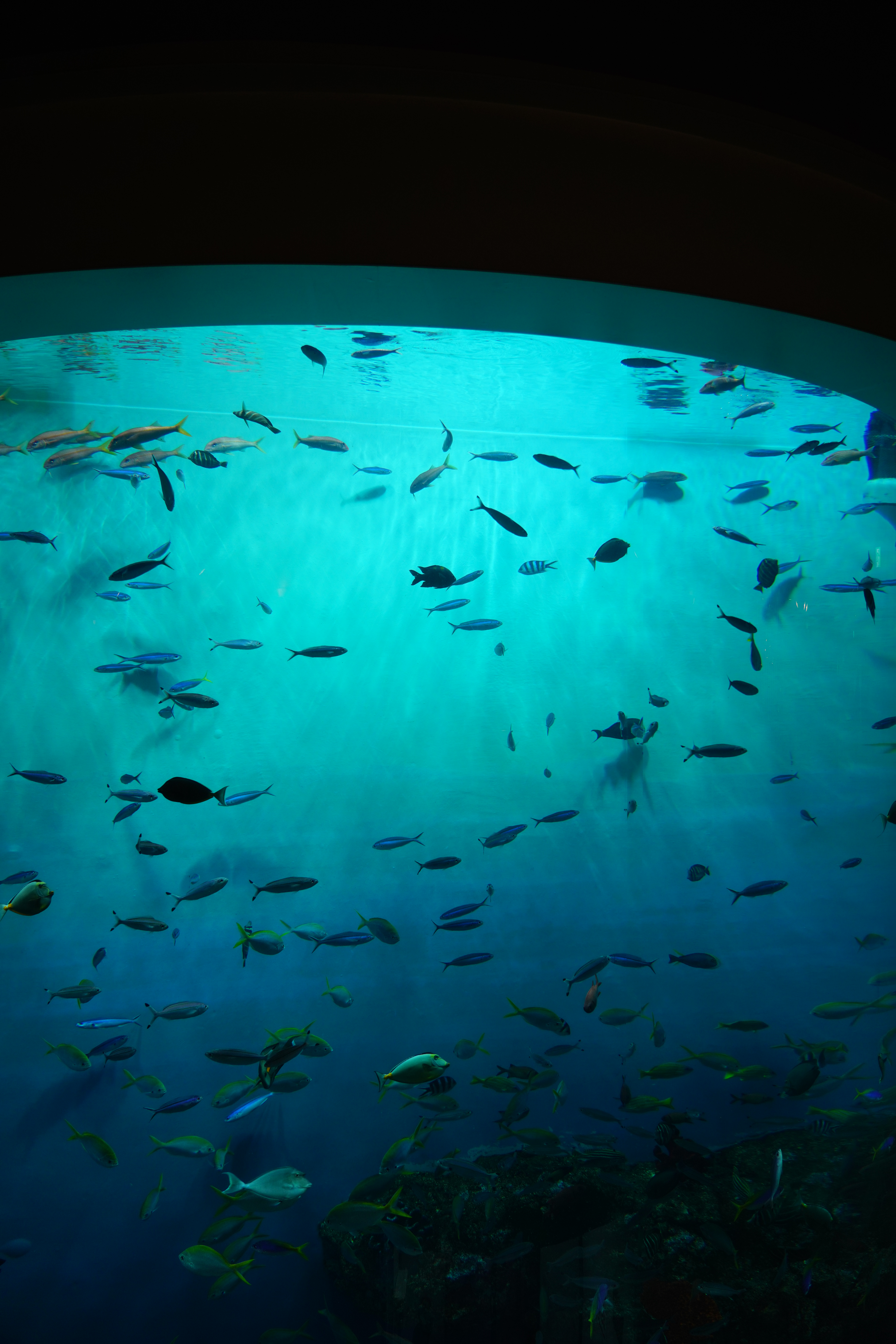

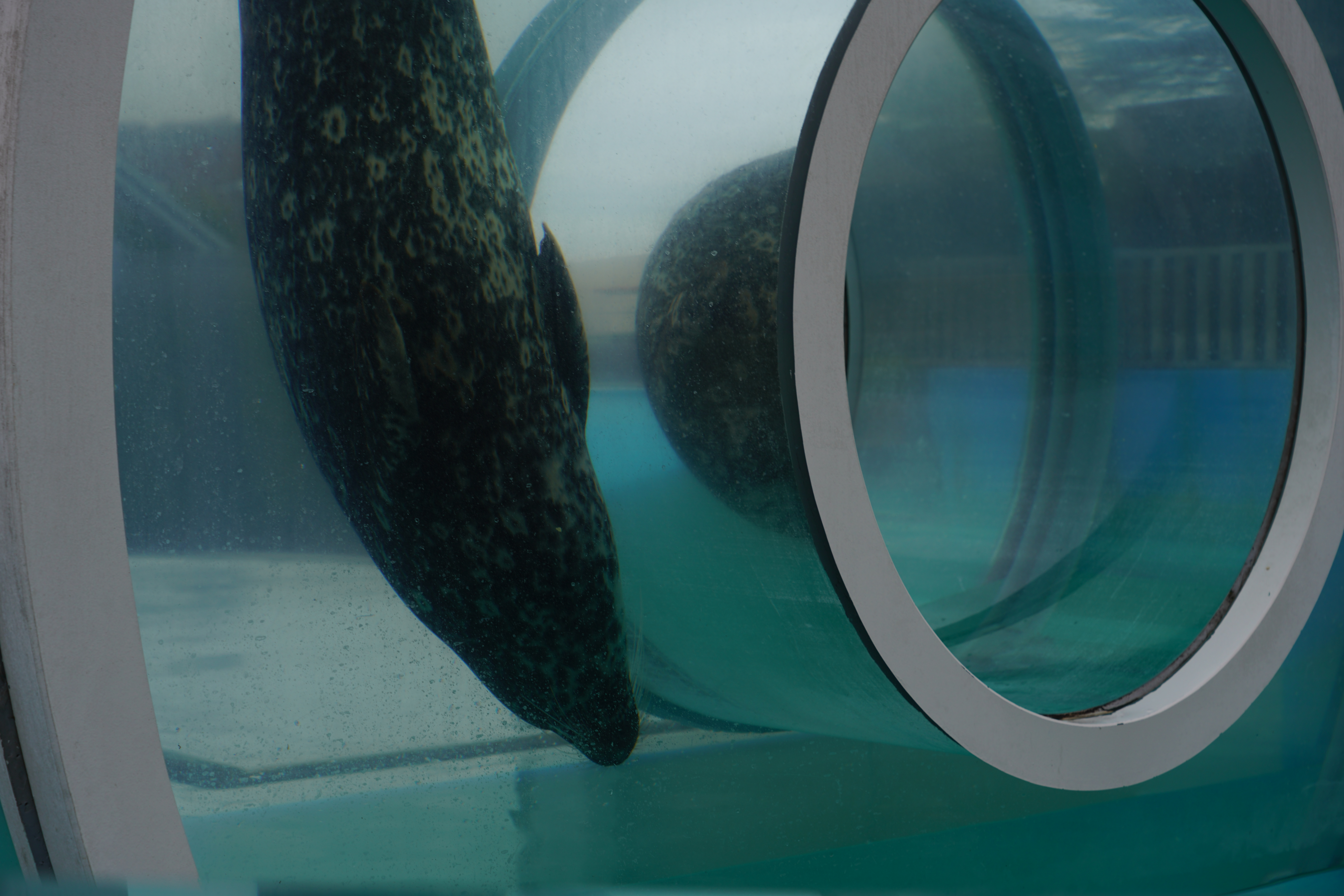

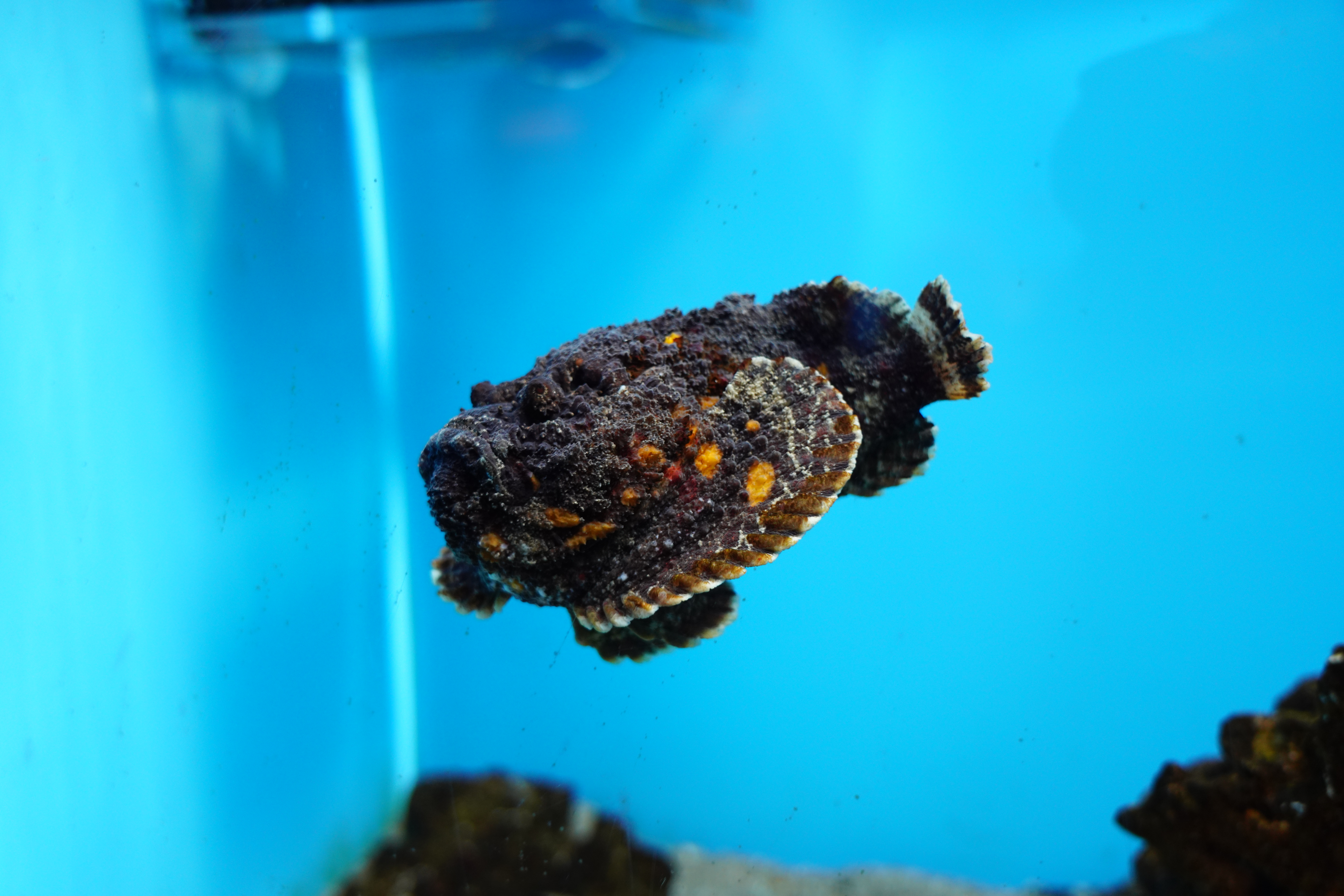

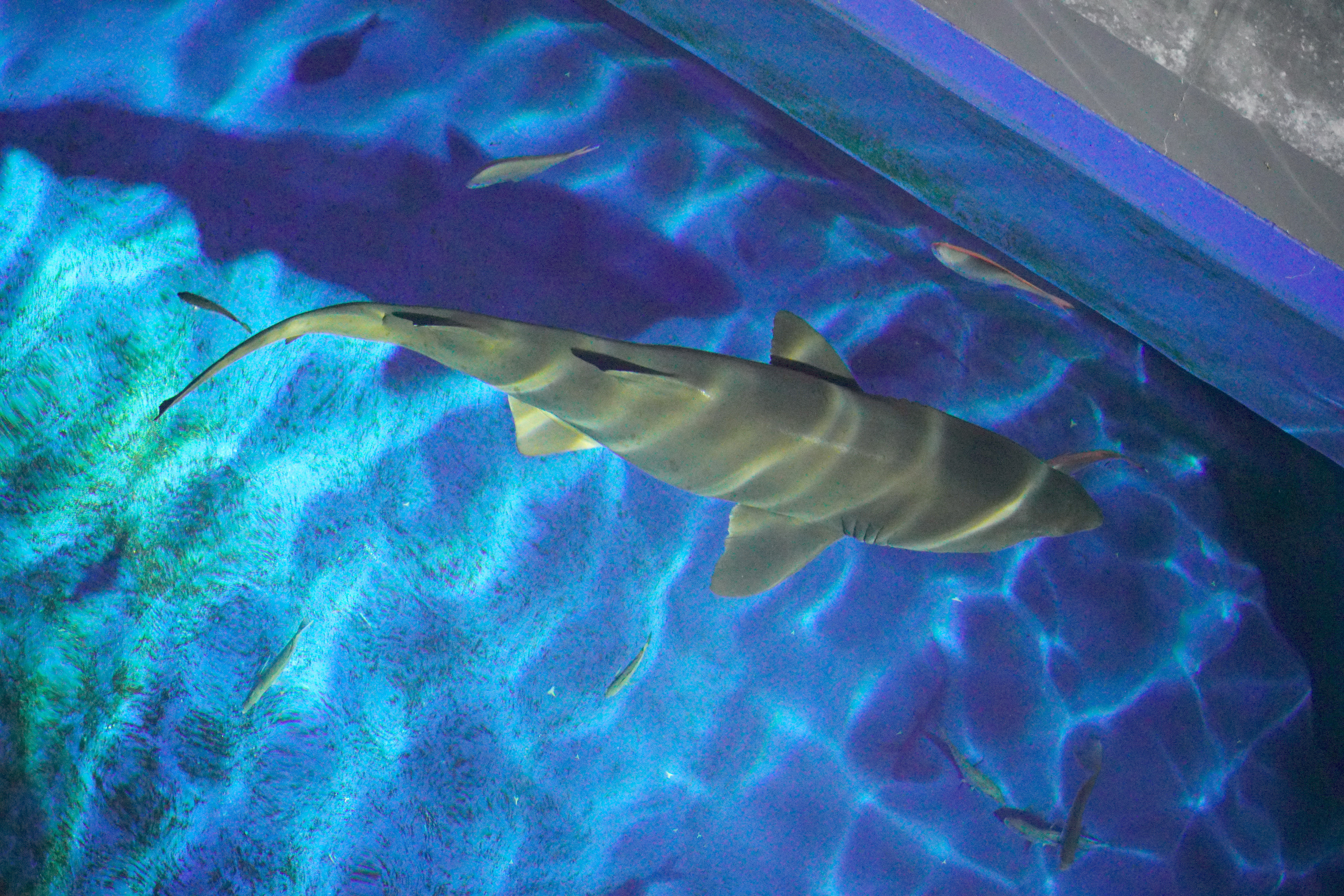

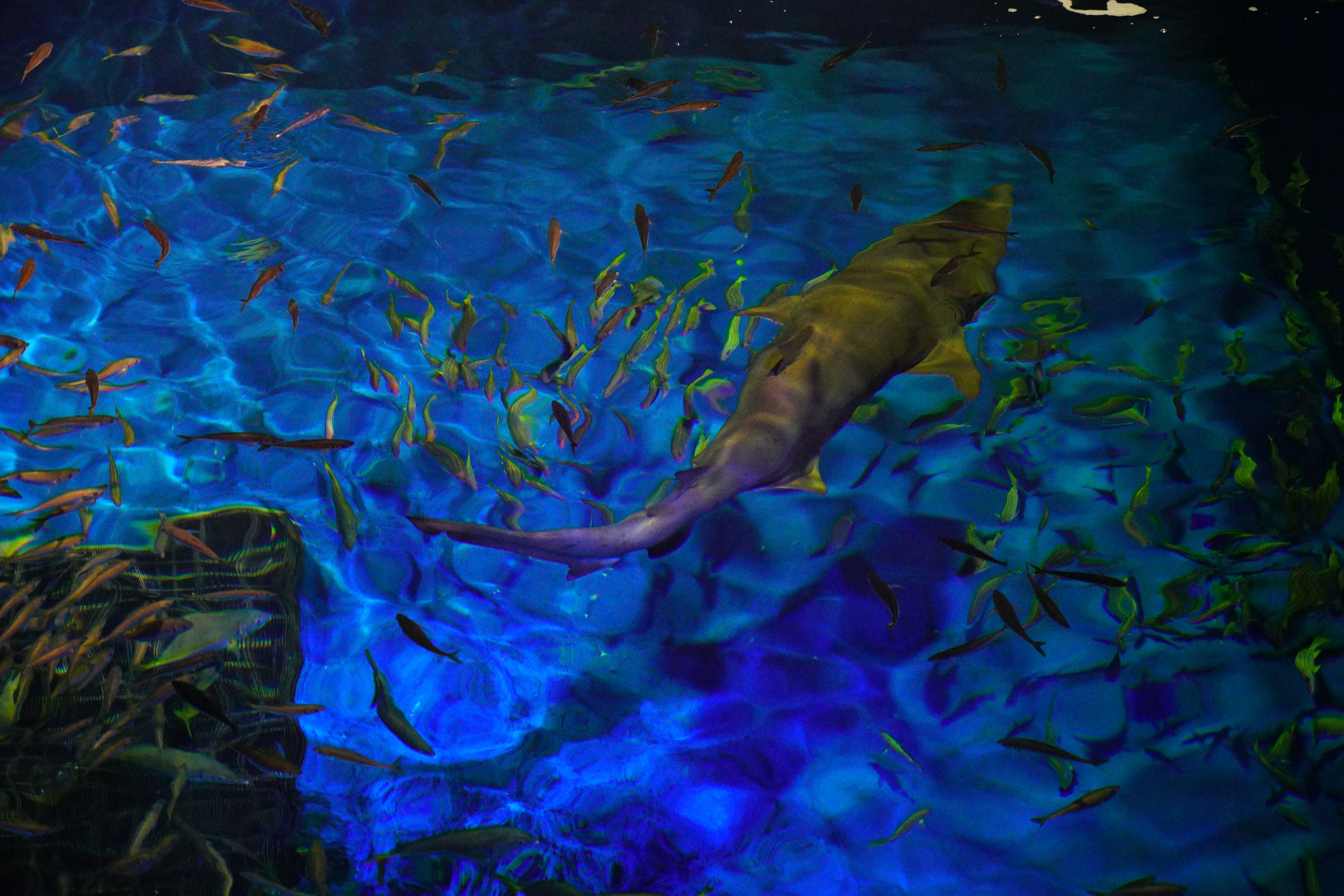

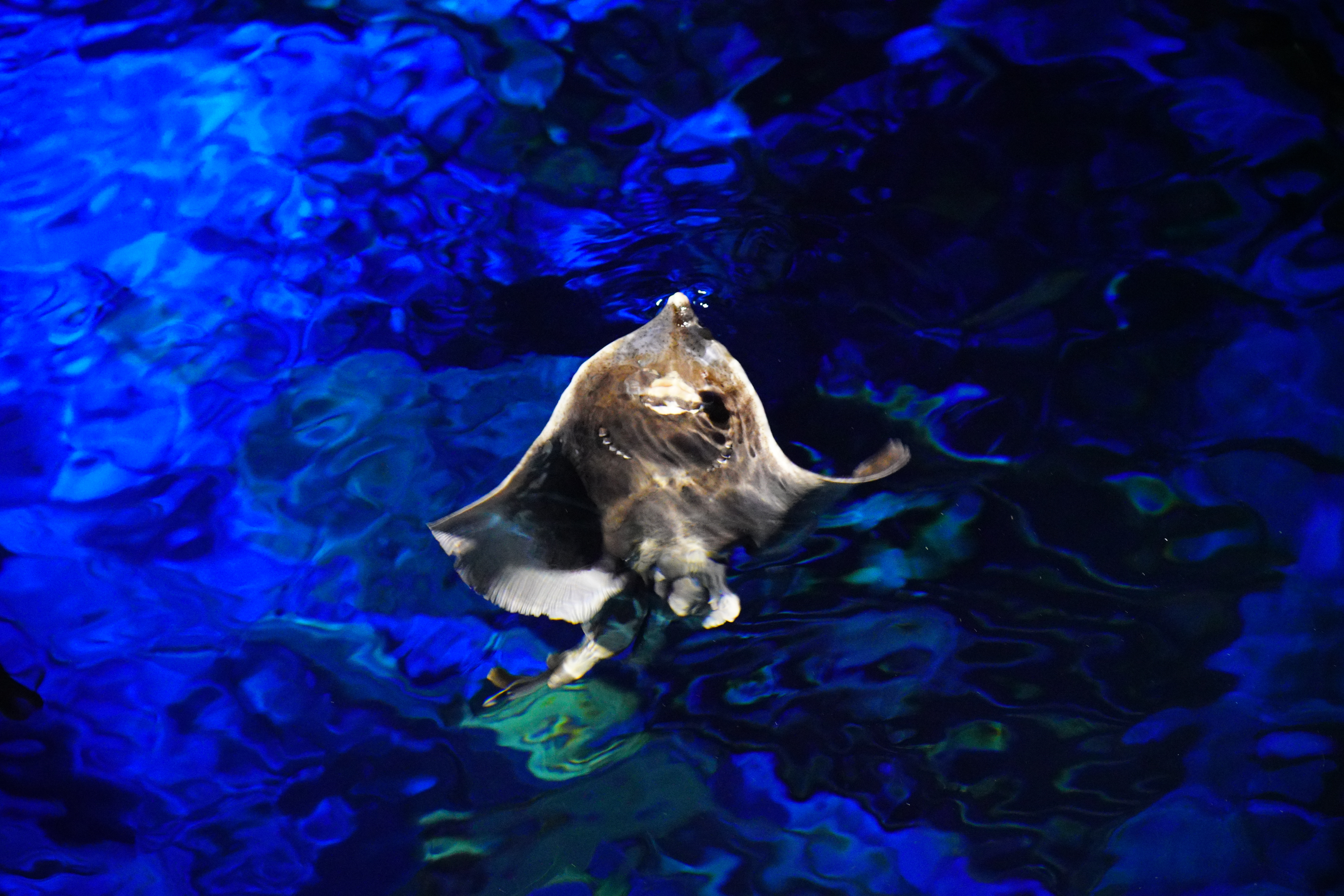

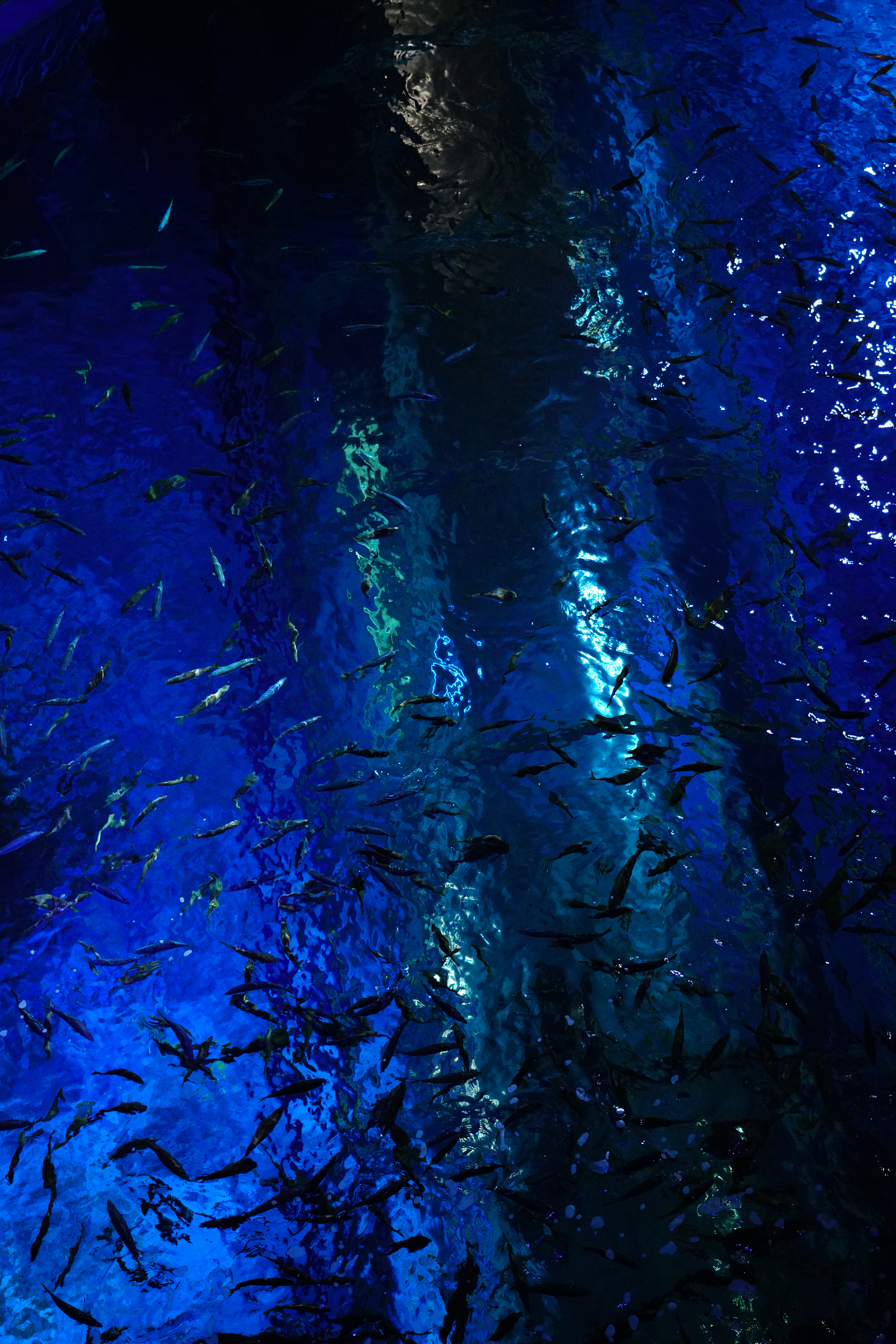

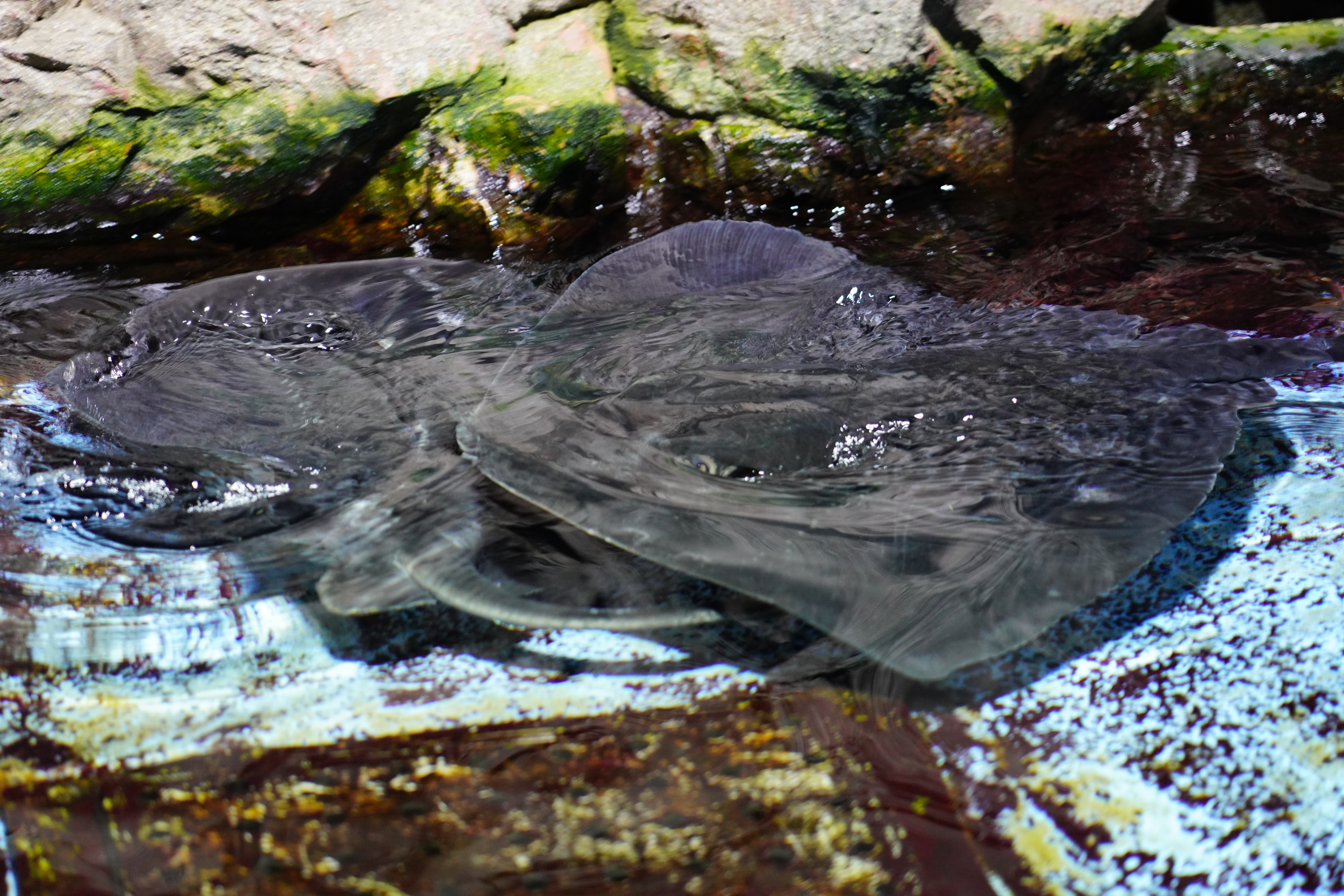

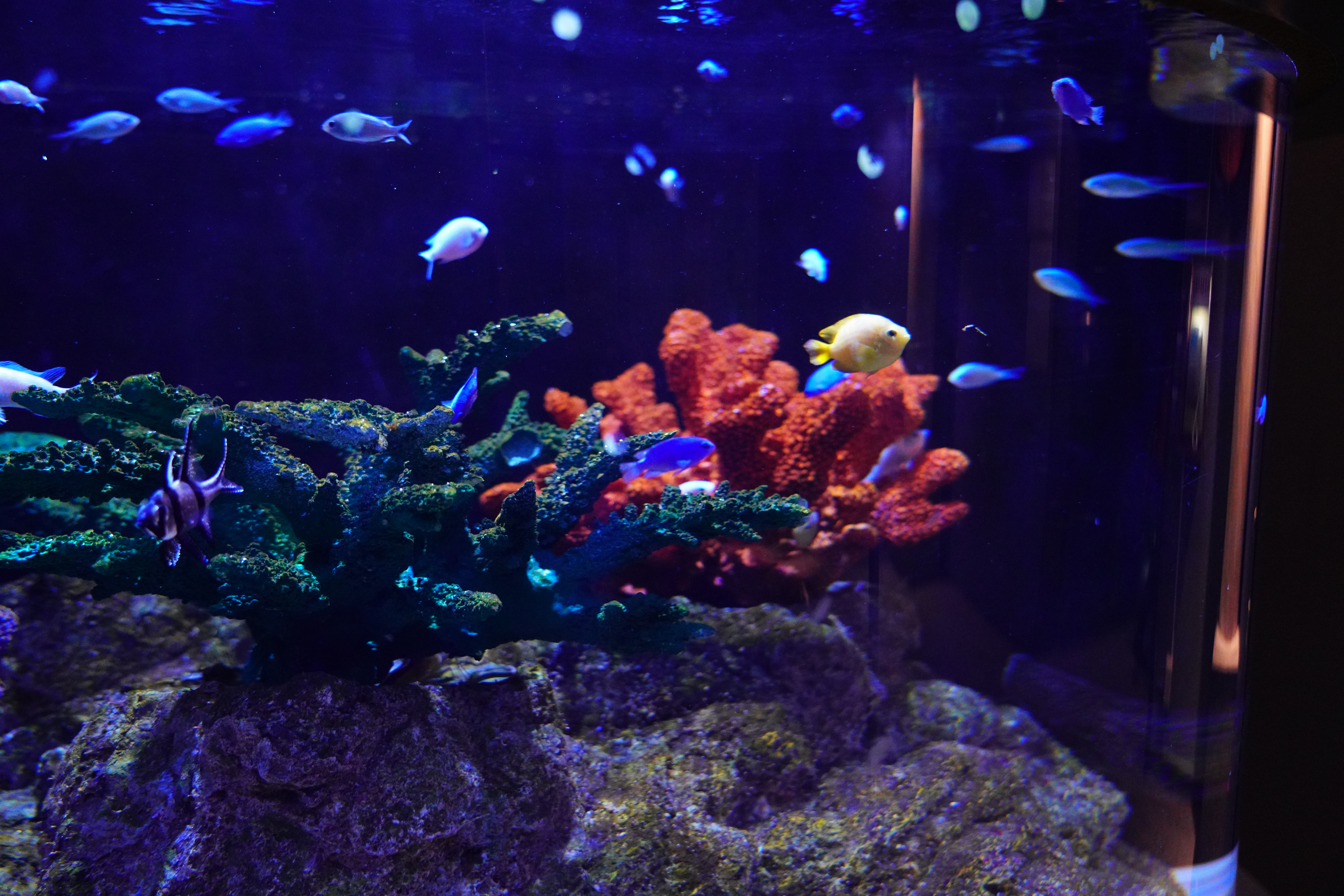

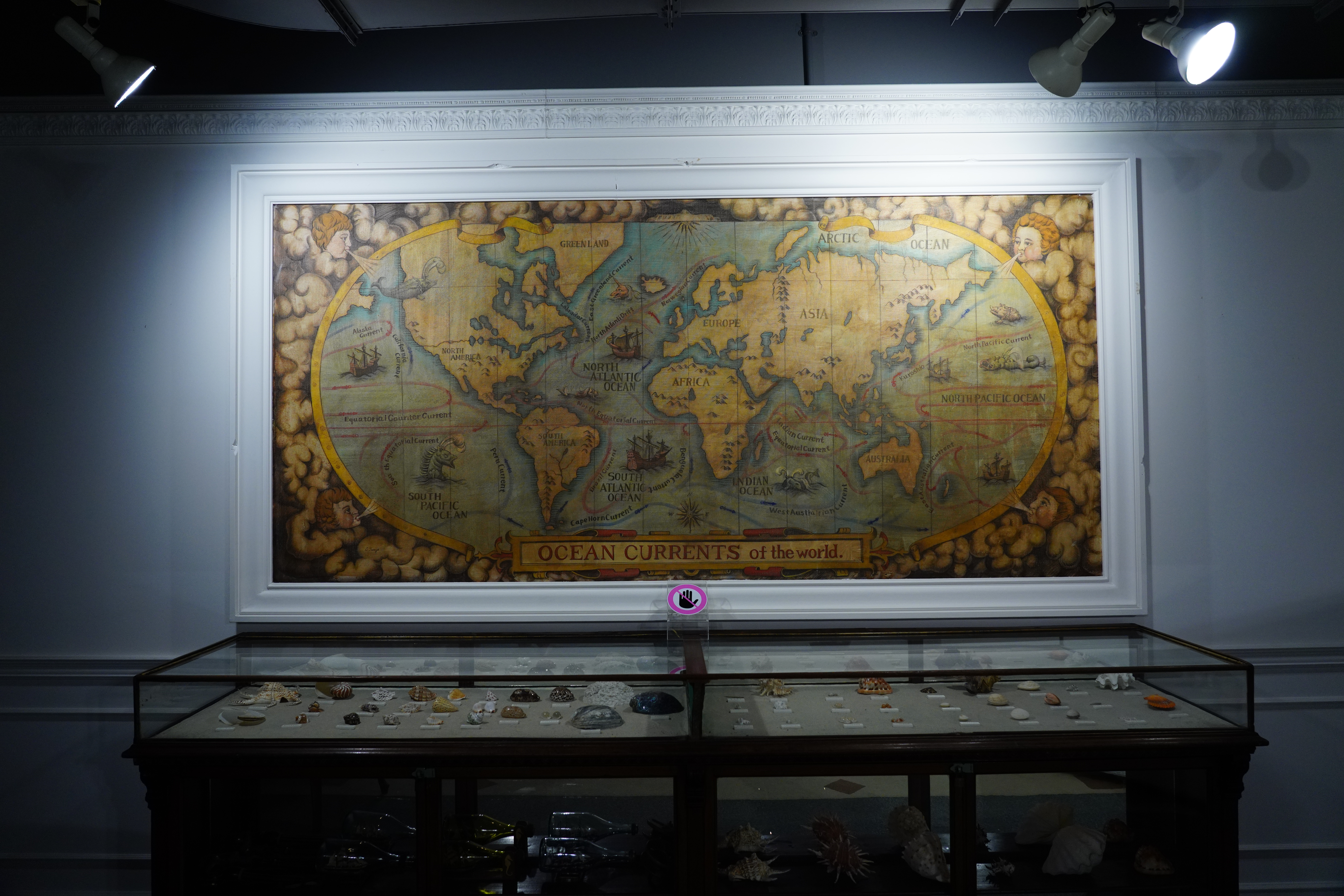

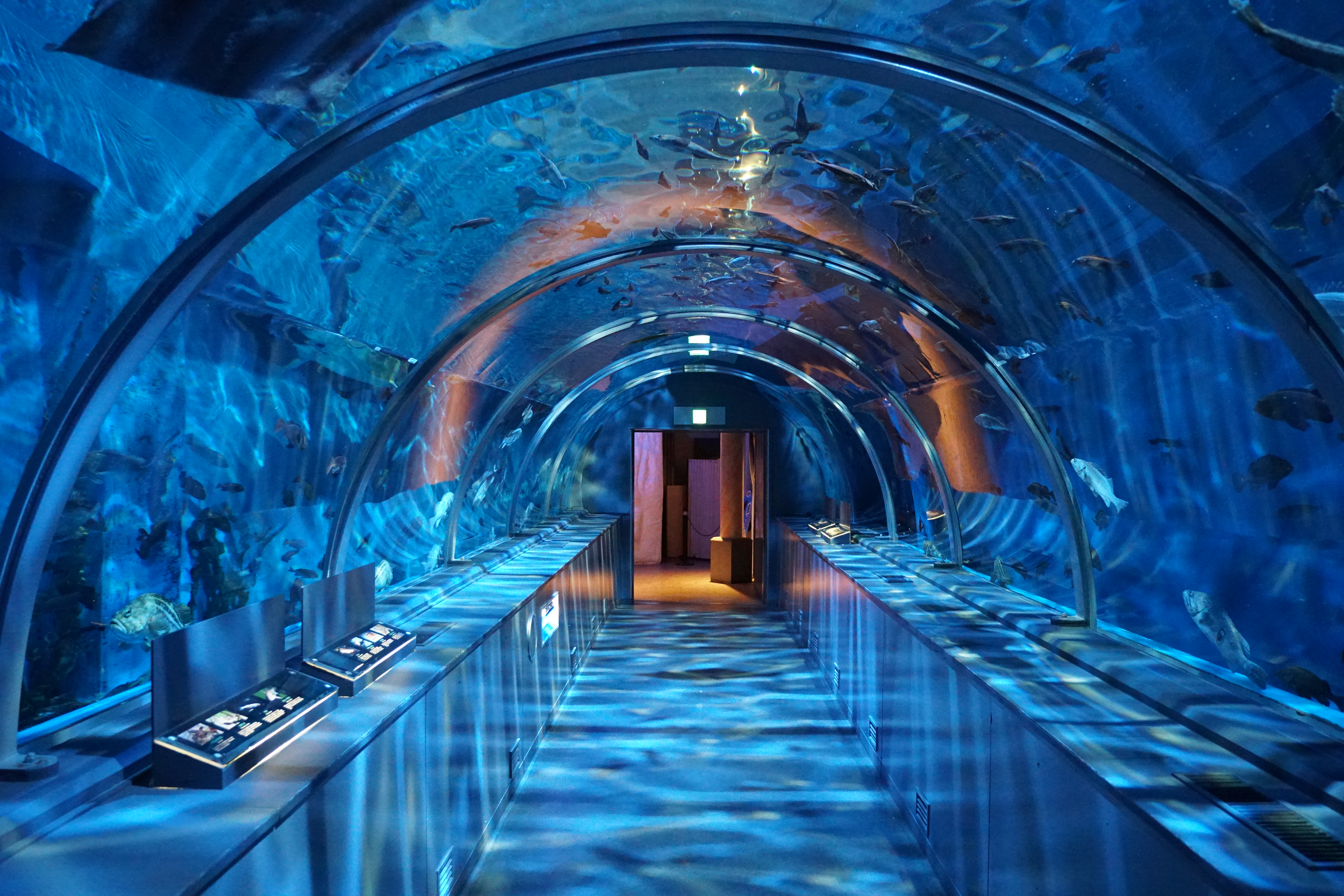

== See also ==
- Kamori Kankō
