= Teineyama Ropeway =

Aerial lift line in Teine, Sapporo, Hokkaidō, Japan

The Teineyama Ropeway (手稲山ロープウェイ, Teineyama Rōpuwei) is a Japanese aerial lift line in Teine, Sapporo, Hokkaidō. The line is operated by Kamori Kankō, which also operates Sapporo Teine (サッポロテイネ) resort around the line, including ski areas, an amusement park, and golf courses. Opened in 1974, the line mainly transports skiers in "winter" (from December to March). In "summer" (from May to October), the line operates only on Saturday and Sunday.

== Basic data ==
- System: Aerial tramway, 1 track cable and 2 haulage ropes
- Cable length: 1,086 m (3,563 ft)
- Vertical interval: 424 m (1,391 ft)
- Maximum gradient: 31°47′
- Operational speed: 5.0 m/s
- Passenger capacity per a cabin: 42
- Cabins: 2
- Stations: 2

== See also ==
- List of aerial lifts in Japan
