= Kamori Kankō =

Japanese tourist company

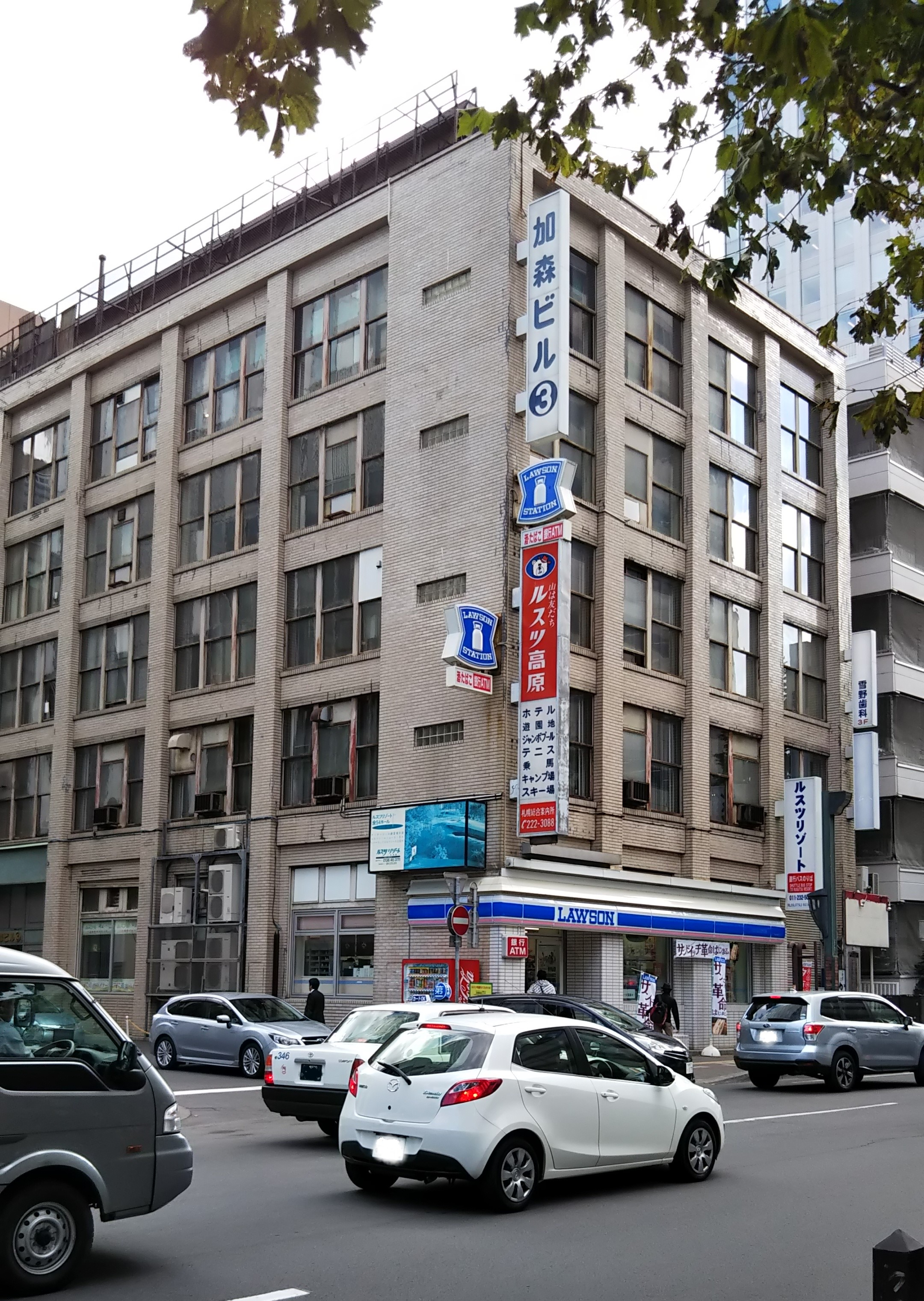
The Kamori office building in 2018

The Kamori Kankō (加森観光) is a tourist company operating hotels and amusement parks, mainly in Hokkaidō, Japan. The company is headquartered in Sapporo. Its most important resort facility has been Rusutsu Resort. The company was founded in 1981, and its group rapidly expanded after 1998, through mergers of underperforming facilities.

== Group facilities ==
=== Resort ===
- Rusutsu Resort: Rusutsu, Hokkaidō. Hotels, ski areas, an amusement park, golf courses
- Sahoro Resort: Shintoku, Hokkaidō. Hotels, ski areas, a bear park, golf courses

=== Leisure facilities ===
- Teine Olympia Amusement Park: Teine, Sapporo, Hokkaidō
- IPC Wan-Nyan Pet Park: Chūō, Sapporo, Hokkaidō
- Lake Shikotsu Sightseeing Boat: Chitose, Hokkaidō
- Noboribetsu Bear Park: Noboribetsu, Hokkaidō
- Noboribetsu Marine Park Nixe: Noboribetsu, Hokkaidō. A public aquarium
- Himeji Central Park: Himeji, Hyōgo, Hyōgo. A safari park, an amusement park
- Space World, Yahata Higashi, Kitakyūshū, Fukuoka. An amusement park (Closing 2017)
- Lone Pine Koala Sanctuary: Fig Tree Pocket, Queensland, Australia

=== Ski areas ===
- Sapporo Teine: Teine, Sapporo, Hokkaidō. Including Teineyama Ropeway
- Nakayama-tōge Ski Field: Kimobetsu, Hokkaidō
- Hakodate Yokotsudake Ski Field: Nanae, Hokkaidō
- Appi Kōgen Ski Field: Hachimantai, Iwate
- Getō Kōgen Ski Field: Kitakami, Iwate
- Ontake Ski Field: Ōtaki, Nagano
- Noboribetsu Sanraiba Ski Field: Noboribetsu, Hokkaidō

=== Hotels ===
- Nakayamatōge Kōgen Hotel: Kimonetsu, Hokkaidō
- Niseko Yamada Onsen Hotel: Kutchan, Hokkaidō
- Art Hotels Sapporo: Chūō, Sapporo, Hokkaidō
- Morioka Grand Hotel: Morioka, Iwate
- Art Hotels Hamamatsuchō: Minato, Tōkyō
- Art Hotels Ōmori: Shinagawa, Tōkyō
- Suginoi Hotel: Beppu, Ōita

=== Golf courses ===
- Royal Ship Sapporo Golf Club: Ishikari, Hokkaidō
- Noboribetsu Onsen Golf Club: Noboribetsu, Hokkaidō
- Orika Golf Club: Minamifurano, Hokkaidō
- Hakodate Yokotsu Golf Course: Nanae, Hokkaidō
- Maple Country Club: Takizawa, Iwate

=== Others ===
- Onsen (hot spring)
- Roadside Station
- Bus
- College
- Restaurant
- Apartment
