= Mashike, Hokkaido =

Mashike 増毛町
- Town
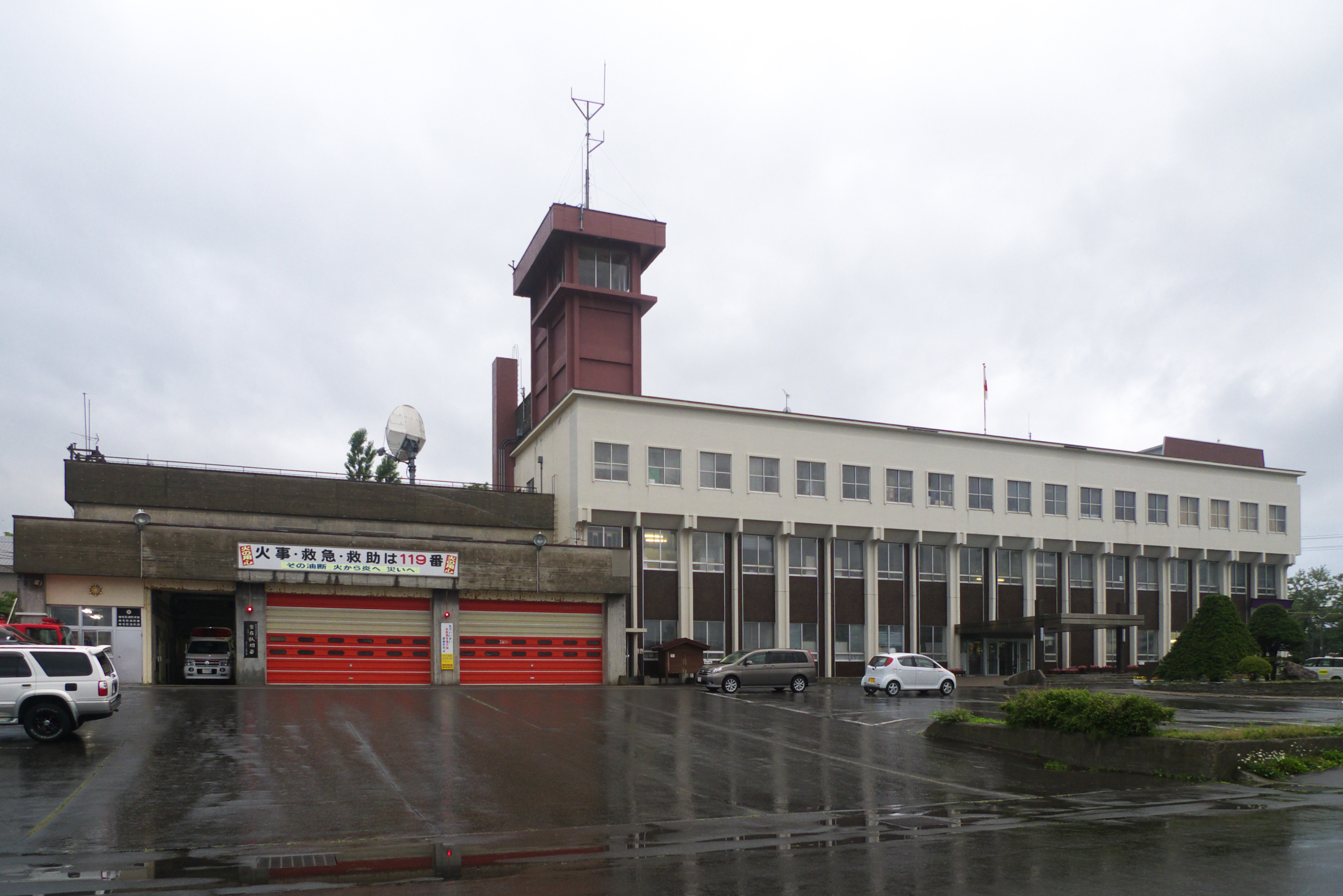
- Mashike town hall

- Flag Emblem
- Interactive map of Mashike
- Location in Japan
- Coordinates: 43°51′22″N 141°31′30″E
- Country: Japan
- Region: Hokkaido
- Prefecture: Hokkaido (Rumoi Subprefecture)
- District: Mashike

Government
  - Mayor: Masashi Hori (from February 2015)

Area
  - Total: 369.72 km^{2} (142.75 sq mi)

Population (January 31, 2025)
  - Total: 3,495
  - Density: 9.453/km^{2} (24.48/sq mi)
- Time zone: UTC+09:00 (JST)
- City hall address: 3-61 Bentencho, Mashike-cho, Mashike-gun, Hokkaido 077-0292
- Climate: Dfb
- Website: Official website
- Symbols
- Bird: Black-tailed gull
- Flower: Sakura
- Tree: Japanese rowan

Mashike (増毛町, Mashike-chō) is a town located in Rumoi Subprefecture, Hokkaido, Japan. As of 31 January 2025, the town had an estimated population of 3,495 in 1,954 households, and a population density of 9.5 people per km^{2}. The total area of the town is 369.72 km^{2} (142.75 sq mi).

== Geography ==
Mashike is located in the southern part of the Rumoi sub-prefecture on the coast of the Sea of Japan. It has a rugged terrain sandwiched between the ocean to the west and the mountains to the east, and most settlements are concentrated on the coast. However, the coast west of Beskari is lined with steep cliffs, and until the opening of Japan National Route 231 in 1981, it was an "island on land" with almost no means of transportation other than by boat. Parts of the town are within the borders of Shokanbetsu-Teuri-Yagishiri Quasi-National Park.

=== Neighbouring municipalities ===
- Hokkaido
  - Rumoi
  - Ishikari
  - Hokuryū
  - Uryū
  - Shintotsukawa

== Climate ==
Mashike has a Humid continental climate (Köppen Dfb) characterized by cold summers and cold winters with heavy snowfall. The average annual temperature in Mashike is 5.6 °C. The average annual rainfall is 1330 mm with September as the wettest month. The temperatures are highest on average in August, at around 19.5 °C, and lowest in January, at around -7.4 °C.

Climate data for Mashike, elevation 20 m (66 ft), (1991−2020 normals, extremes 1978−present)
Month	Jan	Feb	Mar	Apr	May	Jun	Jul	Aug	Sep	Oct	Nov	Dec	Year
Record high °C (°F)	10.5 (50.9)	15.0 (59.0)	17.5 (63.5)	27.7 (81.9)	32.4 (90.3)	29.8 (85.6)	33.6 (92.5)	34.2 (93.6)	33.5 (92.3)	24.0 (75.2)	22.0 (71.6)	15.9 (60.6)	34.2 (93.6)
Mean daily maximum °C (°F)	−0.7 (30.7)	−0.2 (31.6)	3.5 (38.3)	9.9 (49.8)	15.6 (60.1)	19.0 (66.2)	23.0 (73.4)	24.7 (76.5)	21.6 (70.9)	15.5 (59.9)	8.1 (46.6)	1.7 (35.1)	11.8 (53.3)
Daily mean °C (°F)	−3.3 (26.1)	−3.0 (26.6)	0.5 (32.9)	6.0 (42.8)	11.4 (52.5)	15.4 (59.7)	19.5 (67.1)	20.9 (69.6)	17.4 (63.3)	11.5 (52.7)	4.9 (40.8)	−1.0 (30.2)	8.4 (47.0)
Mean daily minimum °C (°F)	−6.4 (20.5)	−6.4 (20.5)	−3.0 (26.6)	1.9 (35.4)	7.1 (44.8)	11.8 (53.2)	16.3 (61.3)	17.3 (63.1)	13.3 (55.9)	7.5 (45.5)	1.7 (35.1)	−3.7 (25.3)	4.8 (40.6)
Record low °C (°F)	−17.4 (0.7)	−16.3 (2.7)	−15.1 (4.8)	−7.1 (19.2)	−1.7 (28.9)	2.4 (36.3)	7.4 (45.3)	9.5 (49.1)	4.5 (40.1)	−1.3 (29.7)	−7.7 (18.1)	−16.3 (2.7)	−17.4 (0.7)
Average precipitation mm (inches)	79.5 (3.13)	52.2 (2.06)	48.2 (1.90)	42.1 (1.66)	54.6 (2.15)	54.4 (2.14)	104.3 (4.11)	121.6 (4.79)	143.4 (5.65)	142.3 (5.60)	145.6 (5.73)	98.0 (3.86)	1,085.9 (42.75)
Average precipitation days (≥ 1.0 mm)	17.0	12.9	11.7	9.9	9.8	8.5	9.2	10.5	13.0	14.7	18.0	18.3	153.5
Mean monthly sunshine hours	38.1	62.2	127.0	179.4	206.7	176.3	172.5	176.9	168.7	121.3	52.6	28.2	1,509.9
Source 1: JMA
Source 2: JMA

=== Demographics ===
Per Japanese census data, the population of Mashike is as shown below. The town is in a long period of sustained population loss.

Historical population
Year	Pop.	±%
1940	9,778	—
1950	16,552	+69.3%
1960	14,657	−11.4%
1970	10,962	−25.2%
1980	8,319	−24.1%
1990	7,166	−13.9%
2000	6,167	−13.9%
2010	5,080	−17.6%
2020	3,908	−23.1%

== History ==
Mashike began as a settlement by Matsumae Domain for herring and salmon fishing in 1706. The area come under the control of Kubota Domain in 1856. In November 1897, Mashike sub-prefecture was established. On July 1, 1900 Mashike was established under the first-class municipal system. The sub-prefecture office relocated to Rumoi in 1914.

== Government ==
Mashike has a mayor-council form of government with a directly elected mayor and a unicameral town council of eight members. Mashike, as part of Rumoi sub-prefecture, contributes one member to the Hokkaidō Prefectural Assembly. In terms of national politics, the town is part of the Hokkaidō 10th district of the lower house of the Diet of Japan.

== Economy ==
The main economic activities of Mashike are commercial fishing and food processing.

== Education ==
Mashike has one public elementary school and one public junior high school operated by the town government. The town does not have a high school.

== Transportation ==
=== Railways ===
Mashike was the terminus of the JR Hokkaido Rumoi Main Line which ran from Fukagawa, but the section of the line between Rumoi and Mashike was closed on 4 December 2016, owing to declining passenger use, and the town no longer has any passenger rail service.

=== Highways ===
- National Route 231

== Local attractions ==
- Shokanbetsu-Teuri-Yagishiri Quasi-National Park and Mt. Shokanbetsu (1491 meters). Camping facilities are available in the park.
- Mashike's main distinction is the sake brewery Kunimare, which is well known throughout Hokkaido.
- Mashike has a small ski resort with only two lifts, although it is the biggest one in Rumoi District.

== Mascot ==
Mercy-kun, the town's mascot

Mashike's mascot is Mercy-kun (マーシーくん) who is a shy sailor seagull. He is known to protect anyone (especially children). His get his energy from eating shrimp, cherries, apples and sake. His charm point is his eyes which allows him to sense any incoming danger. He is unveiled on July 1, 1990.
