= Haboro Line =

Defunct railway line in Hokkaido, Japan

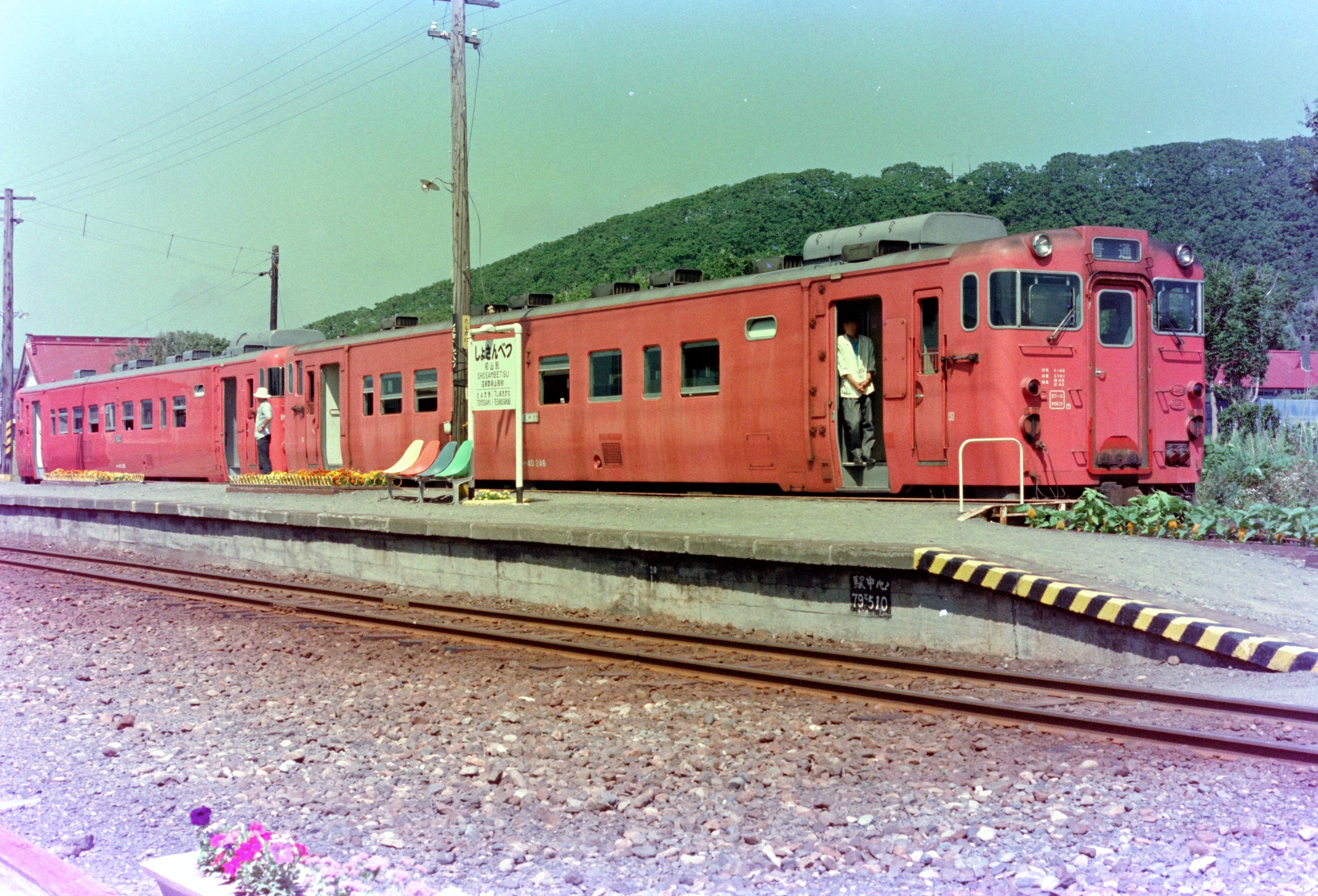
- A pair of KiHa 40 series DMUs at Shosambetsu Station in 1984

Overview
- Owner: Japanese National Railways
- Locale: Hokkaido
- Termini: Rumoi; Horonobe
- Stations: 27

History
- Opened: October 25, 1927 (Rumoi Line, southern part); June 30, 1935 (Teshio Line, northern part); October 18, 1958 (Entire line)
- Closed: March 30, 1987

Technical
- Line length: 141.1 km (87.7 mi)
- Track gauge: 1,067 mm (3 ft 6 in)
- Electrification: Not electrified
- Maximum incline: 20‰
Route map
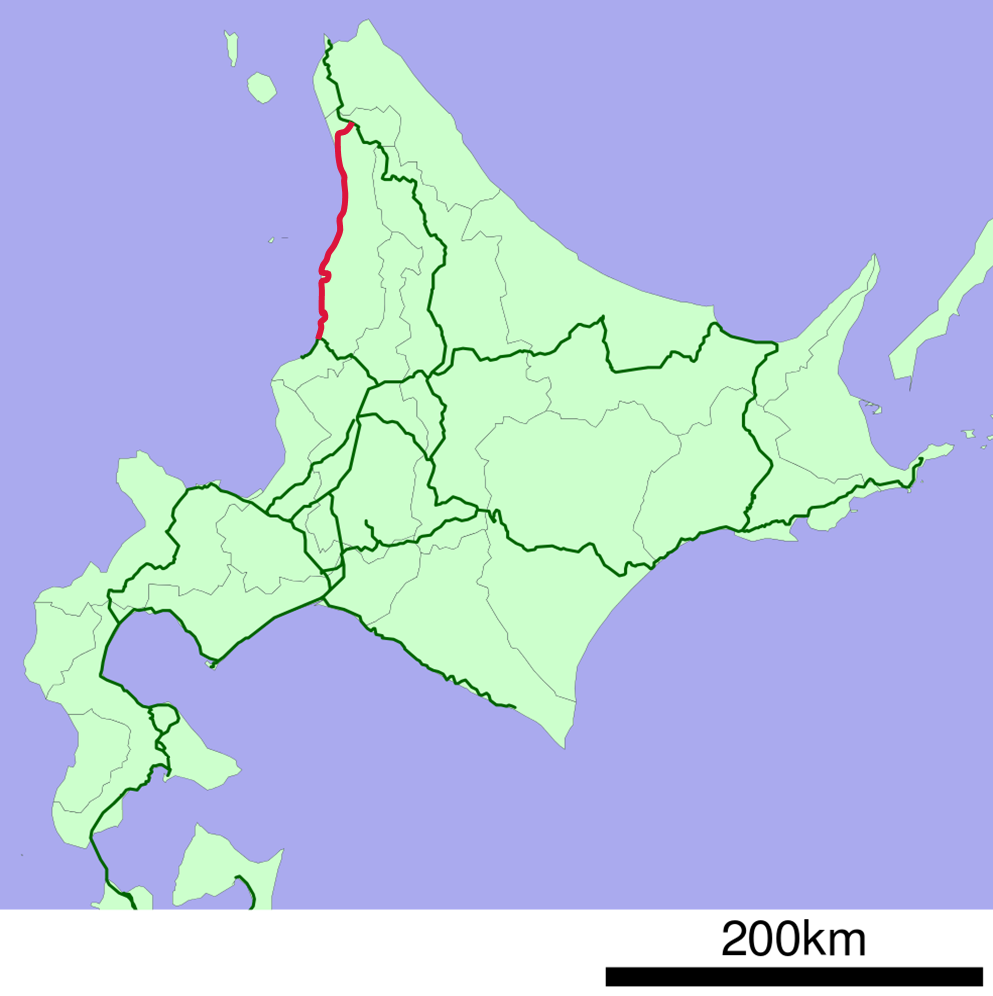

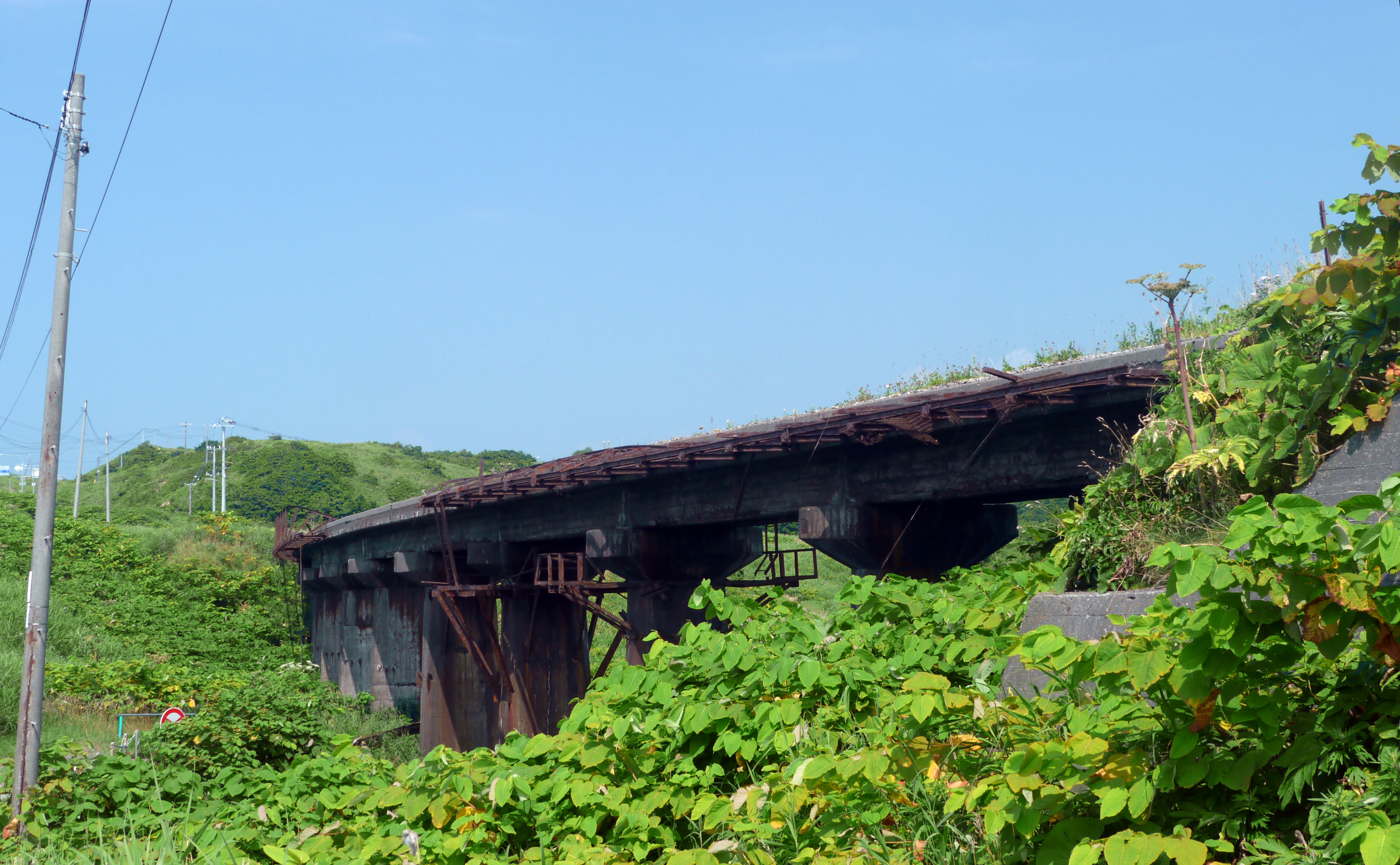
Remains of a bridge of Haboro Line

The Haboro Line (羽幌線, Haboro-sen) was a railway line which was operated by Japanese National Railways in Hokkaidō, Japan. The 141.1 kilometres line connected from Rumoi Station to Horonobe Station via Obira, Tomamae, Haboro, Shosanbetsu, Enbetsu and Teshio until its closure on March 30, 1987. This railway line was connected by Rumoi Main Line on southern terminus and Sōya Main Line on northern terminus.

== History ==
On October 25, 1927, the Ministry of Railways opened the first section between Rumoi and Ōtodo from the south. Less than a year later, on October 1, 1928, the extension to Onishika is opened. In operational terms, the line was then considered a branch of the Rumoi Main Line, it could only be reached from Rumoi by changing direction at the Higashi-Rumoi siding to the east of the station. After the line reached Kotambetsu Station on August 15, 1931, it was no longer considered a branch of the Rumoi Main Line on October 10 of the same year and was named the Haboro Line. Finally, on September 1, 1932, it extended to the namesake town of Haboro.

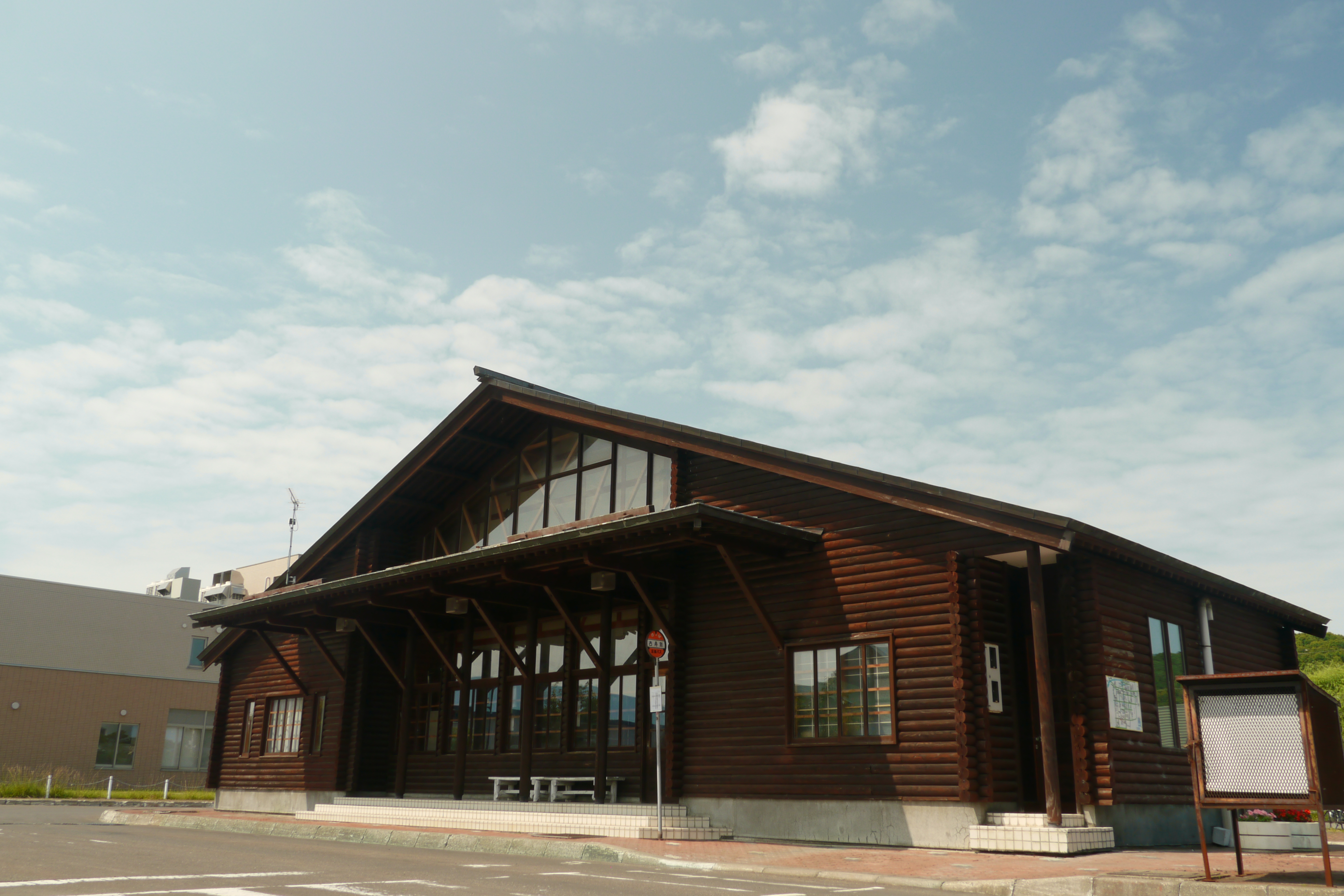
Remains of Kotambetsu Station

Around this time, the Ministry of Railways began construction of the Teshio Line (天塩線, Teshio-sen) from the north. The section between Horonobe and Teshio went into operation on June 30, 1935, followed by the Teshio-Embetsu section on October 23, 1936. The Haboro Line was extended from Haboro to Chikubetsu on December 9, 1941, where it connected to a strategically important mine railway. On the same day, it was given a direct route between Rumoi and Santomari, eliminating the inconvenience of reversing via the Higashi-Rumoi siding. Due to the Pacific War and the economic problems in the post-war period, further line construction was suspended for over a decade. On November 6, 1957, the Japanese State Railway, which was now in charge, put the Chikubetsu-Shosambetsu section into operation. Finally, it completed the line on October 18, 1958, with the closing of the gap between Shosambetsu and Embetsu, whereby the previous Teshio Line was merged into the Haboro Line.

In 1962, the Japanese National Railways introduced diesel locomotive for passenger transportation, as well as a daily pair of express trains from Horonobe via Rumoi to Sapporo. The closure of coal mines, the decline in herring fishing and the expansion of the road network caused the volume of traffic to plummet. Freight transport facilities were gradually abandoned and express train services were discontinued on November 1, 1986. Finally, on March 30, 1987, two days before its privatization, JNR closed down the entire length of the Haboro Line. Since then, a bus route has been operated by Engan Bus.

== Station list ==
All stations are located in Hokkaido Prefecture.

Stations		Distance (km)	Connections	Location
Rumoi	留萌	0.0	Rumoi Main Line	Rumoi
Santomari	三泊	2.7		Rumoi
Usuya	臼谷	6.7		Obira, Rumoi
Obira	小平	8.7		Obira, Rumoi
Hanaoka	花岡	11.9		Obira, Rumoi
Ōtodo	大椴	17.3		Obira, Rumoi
Tomioka	富岡	21.6		Obira, Rumoi
Onishika	鬼鹿	26.1		Obira, Rumoi
Semmatsu	千松	29.3		Obira, Rumoi
Rikibiru	力昼	33.0		Tomamae, Tomamae
Banyanosawa	番屋ノ沢	35.1		Tomamae, Tomamae
Kotambetsu	古丹別	41.7		Tomamae, Tomamae
Uehira	上平	46.6		Tomamae, Tomamae
Tomamae	苫前	50.5		Tomamae, Tomamae
Okotsu	興津	54.6		Tomamae, Tomamae
Haboro	羽幌	58.3		Haboro, Tomamae
Shimonotaki	下ノ滝	62.7		Haboro, Tomamae
Chikubetsu	築別	65.0	Haboro Coal Mine Railway (closed on October 15, 1970)	Haboro, Tomamae
Teshio-Ariake	天塩有明	69.8		Shosanbetsu, Tomamae
Teshio-Sakae	天塩栄	73.6		Shosanbetsu, Tomamae
Shosambetsu	初山別	79.5		Shosanbetsu, Tomamae
Toyosaki	豊岬	85.5		Shosanbetsu, Tomamae
Teshio-Ōsawa	天塩大沢	88.0		Shosanbetsu, Tomamae
Kyōsei	共成	91.6		Shosanbetsu, Tomamae
Utakoshi	歌越	94.2		Enbetsu, Teshio
Teshio-Kanaura	天塩金浦	99.0		Enbetsu, Teshio
Embetsu	遠別	103.3		Enbetsu, Teshio
Keimei	啓明	106.8		Enbetsu, Teshio
Marumatsu	丸松	108.4		Enbetsu, Teshio
Kitasato	北里	110.6		Enbetsu, Teshio
Sarakishi	更岸	116.0		Teshio, Teshio
Kantaku	干拓	118.6		Teshio, Teshio
Teshio	天塩	122.2		Teshio, Teshio
Naka-Kawaguchi	中川口	125.3		Teshio, Teshio
Kita-Kawaguchi	北川口	128.7		Teshio, Teshio
Nishi-Furaoi	西振老	131.4		Teshio, Teshio
Furaoi	振老	133.9		Teshio, Teshio
Sakukaeshi	作返	137.2		Teshio, Teshio
Horonobe	幌延	141.1	Sōya Main Line	Horonobe, Teshio
