= Rumoi =

Rumoi 留萌市
- City
- Panorama view of Rumoi, from Senboudai

- Flag Seal
- /0/queryThe property query is required; /0/idsThe property ids is required; /0Failed to match at least one schema; /0/titleThe property title is required; /0/serviceDoes not have a value in the enumeration ["page"]; /0Failed to match exactly one schema; /0/geometriesThe property geometries is required; /0/typeDoes not have a value in the enumeration ["GeometryCollection"]; /0/typeDoes not have a value in the enumeration ["MultiPolygon"]; /0/typeDoes not have a value in the enumeration ["Point"]; /0/typeDoes not have a value in the enumeration ["MultiPoint"]; /0/typeDoes not have a value in the enumeration ["LineString"]; /0/typeDoes not have a value in the enumeration ["MultiLineString"]; /0/typeDoes not have a value in the enumeration ["Polygon"]; /0/coordinatesThe property coordinates is required; /0/geometryThe property geometry is required; /0/typeDoes not have a value in the enumeration ["Feature"]; /0/featuresThe property features is required; /0/typeDoes not have a value in the enumeration ["FeatureCollection"]; Location of Rumoi in Hokkaido (Rumoi Subprefecture)

- Location in Japan
- Coordinates: 43°56′27″N 141°38′13″E
- Country: Japan
- Region: Hokkaido
- Prefecture: Hokkaido (Rumoi Subprefecture)

Government
  - Mayor: Shunji Nakanishi

Area
  - Total: 297.81 km^{2} (114.99 sq mi)

Population (January 31, 2025)
  - Total: 18,132
  - Density: 60.884/km^{2} (157.69/sq mi)
- Time zone: UTC+09:00 (JST)
- City hall address: 1-11, Saiwaichō, Rumoi-shi, Hokkaidō 077-8601
- Climate: Dfb
- Website: Official website
- Symbols
- Flower: Azalea
- Tree: Acacia

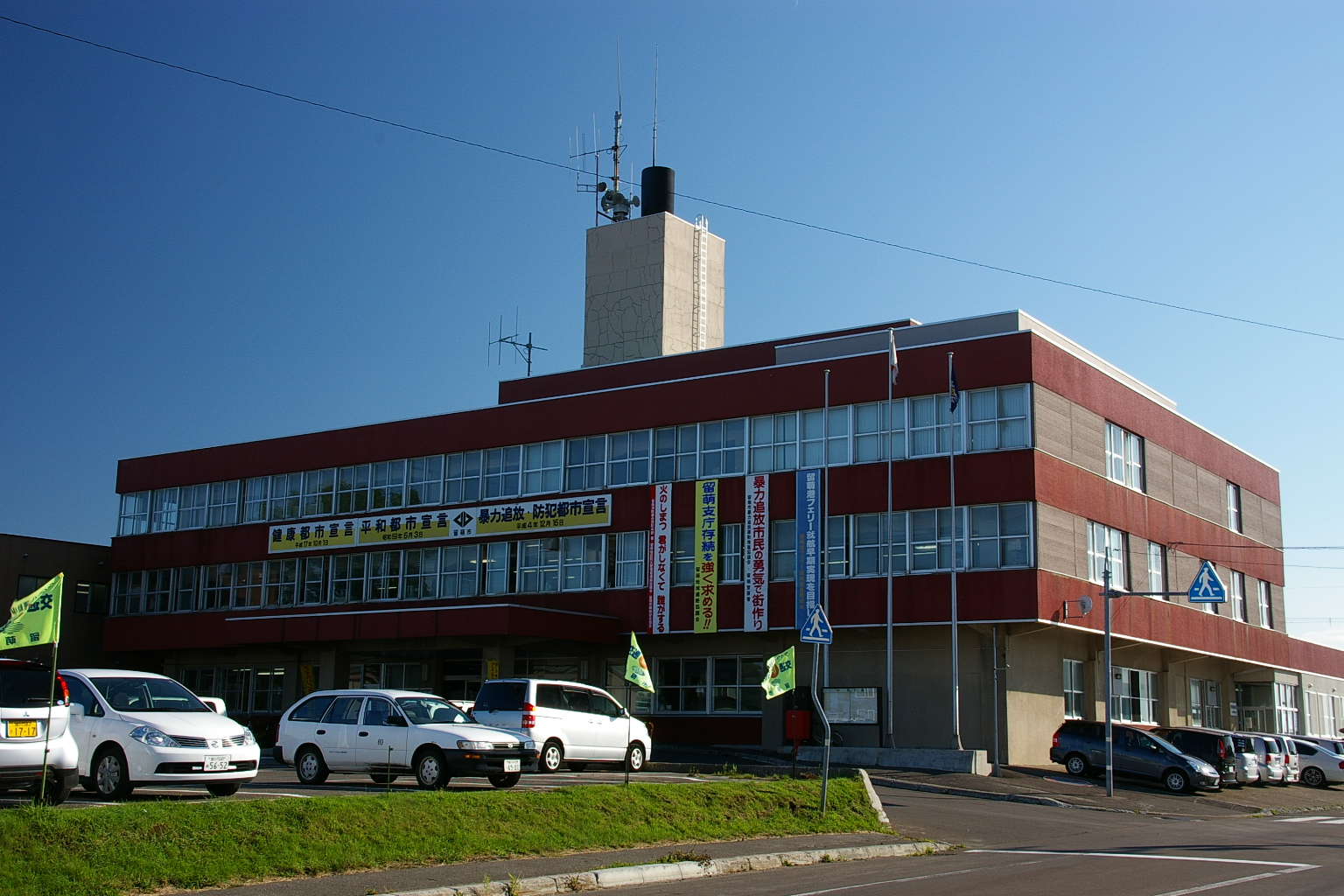
Rumoi city hall

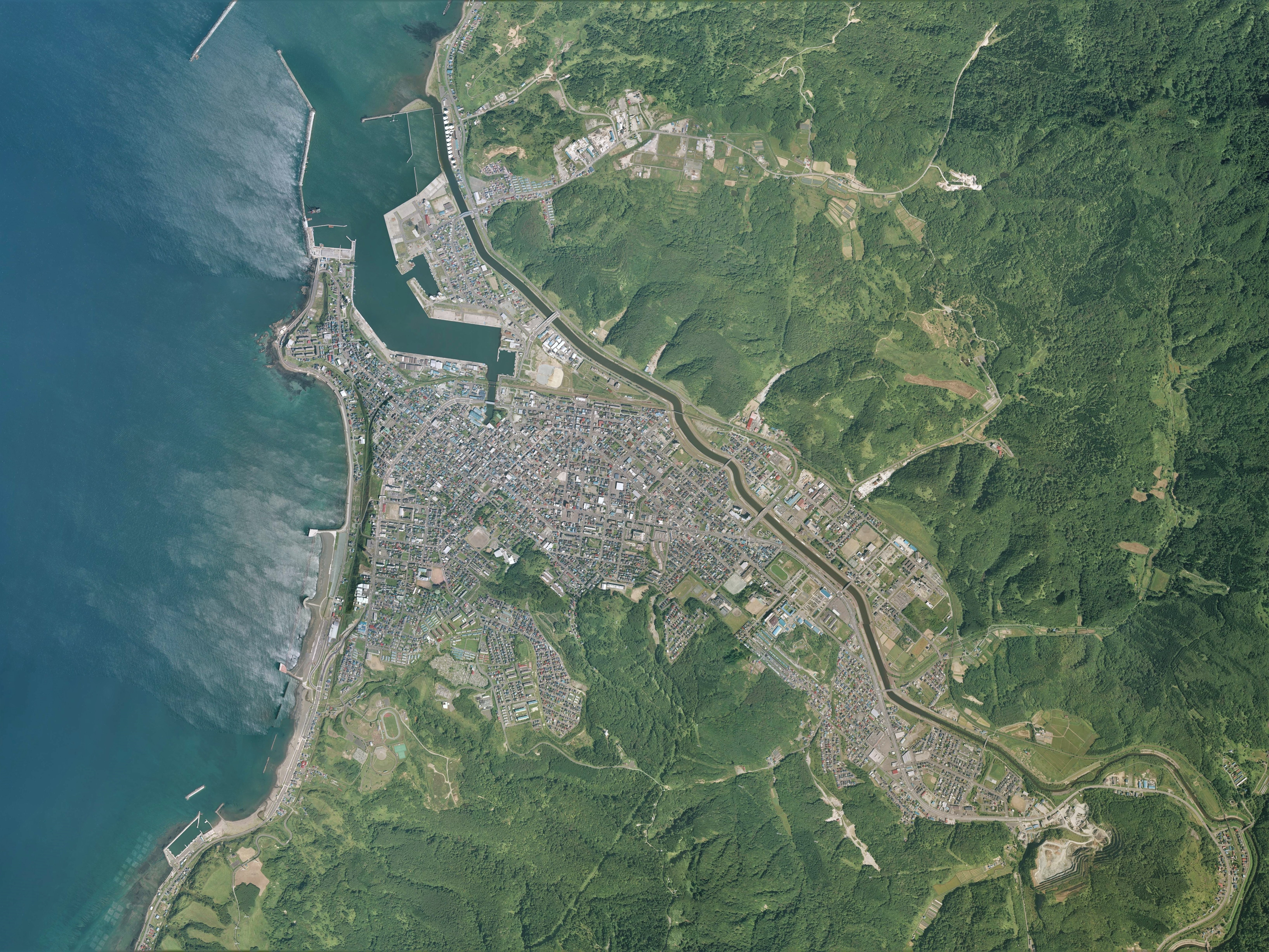
central Rumoi

Rumoi (留萌市, Rumoi-shi) is a city in Rumoi Subprefecture, Hokkaido, Japan. As of 31 January 2025, the city had an estimated population of 18,132 in 10519 households, and a population density of 61 people per km^{2}. The total area of the city is 297.81 km^{2} (114.99 sq mi). There are several theories about the origin of the name, which comes from the Ainu word for the Rumoi River. The word "rur-mo-ot-pe," means "a river with calm, constant tides," or "a river with deep tides," and this theory has been adopted by the city.

== Geography ==
Rumoi is located in the south of Rumoi Subprefecture, on the coast of the Sea of Japan. Rumoi River flows through the city.

=== Neighbouring municipalities ===
- Hokkaido
  - Mashike
  - Obira
  - Hokuryū
  - Numata

=== Demographics ===
Per Japanese census data, the population of Rumoi is as shown below. The city is in a long period of sustained population loss.

Historical population
Year	Pop.	±%
1940	20,341	—
1950	32,513	+59.8%
1960	35,818	+10.2%
1970	38,691	+8.0%
1980	36,626	−5.3%
1990	32,429	−11.5%
2000	28,325	−12.7%
2010	24,454	−13.7%
2020	20,114	−17.7%

== Climate ==
Rumoi has a humid continental climate (Köppen climate classification Dfb) with warm summers and cold winters. Precipitation is significant throughout the year, but is heaviest from August to December. The highest temperature recorded was 35.6 °C (96 °F) on August 1, 2021.

Climate data for Rumoi (elevation 23.6 m, 1991–2020 normals, extremes 1943–present)
Month	Jan	Feb	Mar	Apr	May	Jun	Jul	Aug	Sep	Oct	Nov	Dec	Year
Record high °C (°F)	8.3 (46.9)	14.0 (57.2)	16.8 (62.2)	24.6 (76.3)	29.3 (84.7)	32.0 (89.6)	33.7 (92.7)	35.6 (96.1)	33.1 (91.6)	28.3 (82.9)	21.2 (70.2)	14.0 (57.2)	35.6 (96.1)
Mean maximum °C (°F)	4.2 (39.6)	5.7 (42.3)	10.6 (51.1)	19.3 (66.7)	24.7 (76.5)	26.2 (79.2)	29.2 (84.6)	29.7 (85.5)	27.5 (81.5)	21.7 (71.1)	16.0 (60.8)	7.9 (46.2)	30.8 (87.4)
Mean daily maximum °C (°F)	−1.0 (30.2)	−0.4 (31.3)	3.2 (37.8)	9.4 (48.9)	15.4 (59.7)	19.2 (66.6)	23.1 (73.6)	24.6 (76.3)	21.4 (70.5)	15.2 (59.4)	7.8 (46.0)	1.3 (34.3)	11.6 (52.9)
Daily mean °C (°F)	−4.1 (24.6)	−3.7 (25.3)	0.0 (32.0)	5.5 (41.9)	11.1 (52.0)	15.4 (59.7)	19.6 (67.3)	20.9 (69.6)	17.2 (63.0)	11.1 (52.0)	4.4 (39.9)	−1.5 (29.3)	8.0 (46.4)
Mean daily minimum °C (°F)	−7.4 (18.7)	−7.4 (18.7)	−3.5 (25.7)	1.6 (34.9)	7.2 (45.0)	12.3 (54.1)	16.7 (62.1)	17.7 (63.9)	13.1 (55.6)	6.9 (44.4)	1.1 (34.0)	−4.4 (24.1)	4.5 (40.1)
Mean minimum °C (°F)	−14.7 (5.5)	−15.3 (4.5)	−10.5 (13.1)	−3.5 (25.7)	1.0 (33.8)	6.5 (43.7)	11.4 (52.5)	12.7 (54.9)	6.7 (44.1)	1.0 (33.8)	−4.5 (23.9)	−11.7 (10.9)	−16.9 (1.6)
Record low °C (°F)	−23.4 (−10.1)	−22.8 (−9.0)	−22.4 (−8.3)	−10.1 (13.8)	−2.8 (27.0)	1.6 (34.9)	5.0 (41.0)	7.1 (44.8)	1.1 (34.0)	−4.4 (24.1)	−9.5 (14.9)	−21.4 (−6.5)	−23.4 (−10.1)
Average precipitation mm (inches)	95.8 (3.77)	68.5 (2.70)	53.5 (2.11)	43.2 (1.70)	59.7 (2.35)	56.3 (2.22)	113.9 (4.48)	126.6 (4.98)	145.4 (5.72)	131.4 (5.17)	140.0 (5.51)	119.9 (4.72)	1,154.1 (45.44)
Average snowfall cm (inches)	165 (65)	120 (47)	75 (30)	9 (3.5)	0 (0)	0 (0)	0 (0)	0 (0)	0 (0)	0 (0)	35 (14)	147 (58)	546 (215)
Average precipitation days (≥ 0.5 mm)	23.8	19.8	16.8	12.4	10.8	9.7	10.7	11.3	14.4	17.1	21.3	24.8	193.1
Average snowy days	29.9	26.1	23.2	10.3	0.7	0.0	0.0	0.0	0.0	2.2	17.1	28.8	139.4
Average relative humidity (%)	77	75	72	72	76	82	85	83	79	74	74	76	77
Mean monthly sunshine hours	48.0	69.7	129.7	174.5	201.2	174.0	169.2	174.4	167.5	124.3	51.9	29.6	1,514
Source: Japan Meteorological Agency (1991–2020 normals, extremes 1943–present)

Climate data for Horonuka, Rumoi (elevation 20 m, 1991–2020 normals, extremes 1977–present)
Month	Jan	Feb	Mar	Apr	May	Jun	Jul	Aug	Sep	Oct	Nov	Dec	Year
Record high °C (°F)	8.1 (46.6)	12.4 (54.3)	13.7 (56.7)	26.0 (78.8)	32.5 (90.5)	34.2 (93.6)	35.3 (95.5)	35.9 (96.6)	31.9 (89.4)	28.3 (82.9)	20.5 (68.9)	13.4 (56.1)	35.9 (96.6)
Mean daily maximum °C (°F)	−2.2 (28.0)	−1.2 (29.8)	2.8 (37.0)	9.4 (48.9)	17.2 (63.0)	21.3 (70.3)	24.9 (76.8)	25.7 (78.3)	21.8 (71.2)	15.0 (59.0)	6.6 (43.9)	−0.2 (31.6)	11.8 (53.2)
Daily mean °C (°F)	−6.5 (20.3)	−6.1 (21.0)	−1.8 (28.8)	3.9 (39.0)	10.9 (51.6)	15.5 (59.9)	19.6 (67.3)	20.3 (68.5)	15.7 (60.3)	9.1 (48.4)	2.5 (36.5)	−3.6 (25.5)	6.6 (43.9)
Mean daily minimum °C (°F)	−12.0 (10.4)	−12.5 (9.5)	−7.6 (18.3)	−1.6 (29.1)	4.7 (40.5)	10.6 (51.1)	15.2 (59.4)	15.8 (60.4)	10.3 (50.5)	3.7 (38.7)	−1.4 (29.5)	−7.6 (18.3)	1.5 (34.7)
Record low °C (°F)	−35.4 (−31.7)	−33.4 (−28.1)	−30.0 (−22.0)	−18.4 (−1.1)	−4.2 (24.4)	0.2 (32.4)	5.8 (42.4)	5.8 (42.4)	0.1 (32.2)	−6.3 (20.7)	−17.4 (0.7)	−30.5 (−22.9)	−35.4 (−31.7)
Average precipitation mm (inches)	161.5 (6.36)	106.9 (4.21)	82.4 (3.24)	57.2 (2.25)	66.7 (2.63)	59.8 (2.35)	119.4 (4.70)	135.4 (5.33)	162.4 (6.39)	160.4 (6.31)	202.8 (7.98)	194.4 (7.65)	1,509 (59.41)
Average snowfall cm (inches)	301 (119)	225 (89)	153 (60)	53 (21)	2 (0.8)	0 (0)	0 (0)	0 (0)	0 (0)	0 (0)	105 (41)	288 (113)	1,127 (443.8)
Average precipitation days (≥ 1.0 mm)	24.1	19.3	17.0	12.0	10.8	8.8	9.5	10.8	13.4	16.3	22.2	25.3	189.5
Mean monthly sunshine hours	40.8	60.7	115.8	168.2	197.8	167.1	161.7	164.0	158.8	120.7	53.3	27.6	1,436.5
Source: Japan Meteorological Agency (1991–2020 normals, extremes 1977–present)

=== Average wind speed by month ===
(Annual average: 4.9 m/s or 18 km/h or 11 mph)

Month	m/s	km/h	mph
January	6.1	22	14
February	5.3	19	12
March	4.9	18	11
April	4.8	17	11
May	4.2	15	9
June	3.5	13	8
July	3.4	12	8
August	3.8	14	9
September	4.5	16	10
October	5.8	21	13
November	6.5	23	15
December	6.5	23	15

== History ==
Rumoi was developed by herring fishery and mining.

- 1869: Rurumoppe was renamed Rumoi.
- 1877: The village of Rumoi was founded.
- 1902: The villages of Rumoi and Reuke were merged to form Rumoi Village.
- 1907: Sandomari village was merged into Rumoi village.
- 1908: Rumoi village became Rumoi town.
- 1914: The capital of Mashike Subprefecture was transferred from Mashike to Rumoi and Mashike Subprefecture was renamed Rumoi Subprefecture.
- 1919: Obirashibe village (now Obira town) was split off.
- 1945: Rumoi was designated as the site of the proposed Soviet invasion of Hokkaido, with a plan to occupy the island from Rumoi in the west to Kushiro in the east. The plan was cancelled.
- 1947: Rumoi town became Rumoi city.

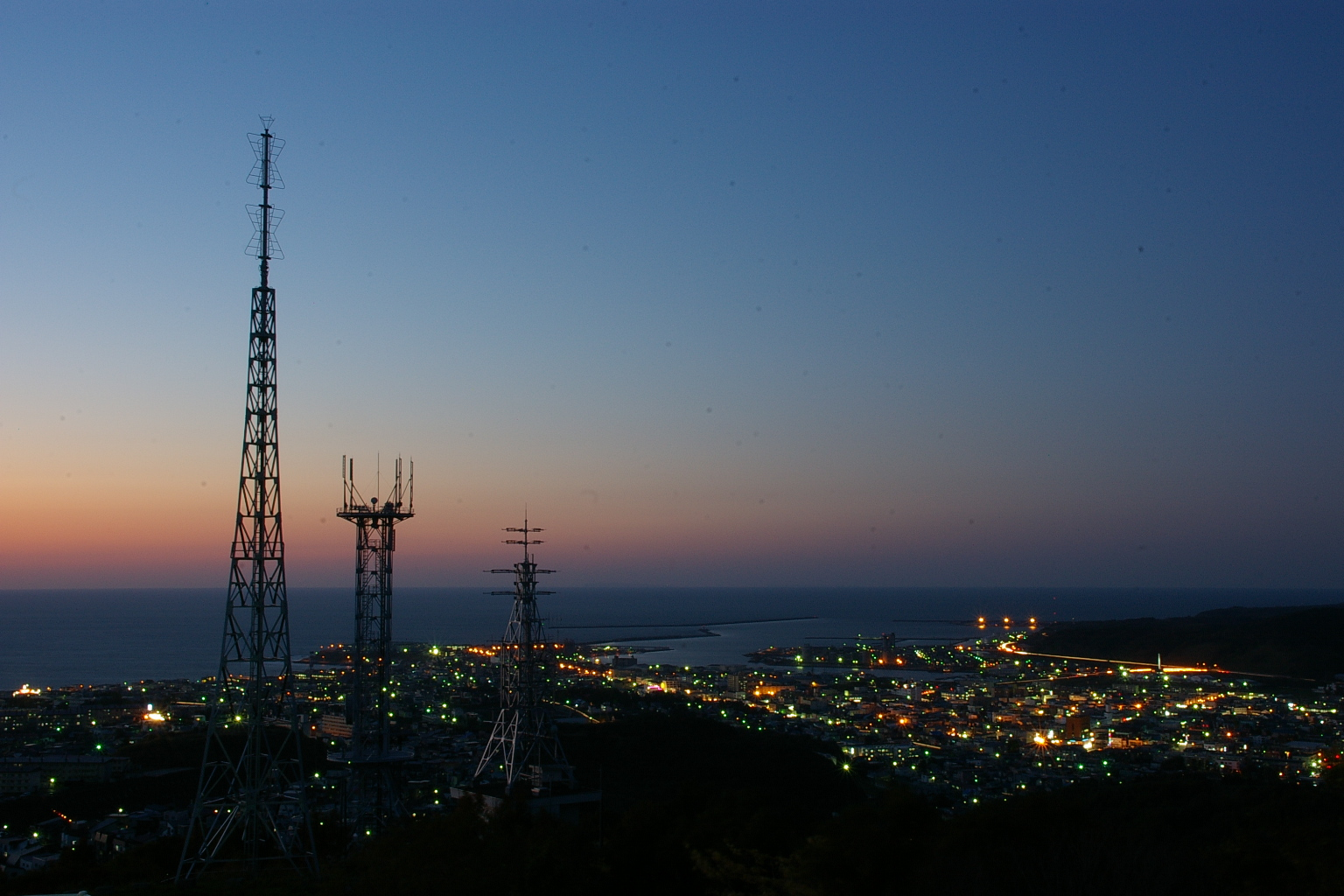
View of Downtown Rumoi from Senbou Hill in night

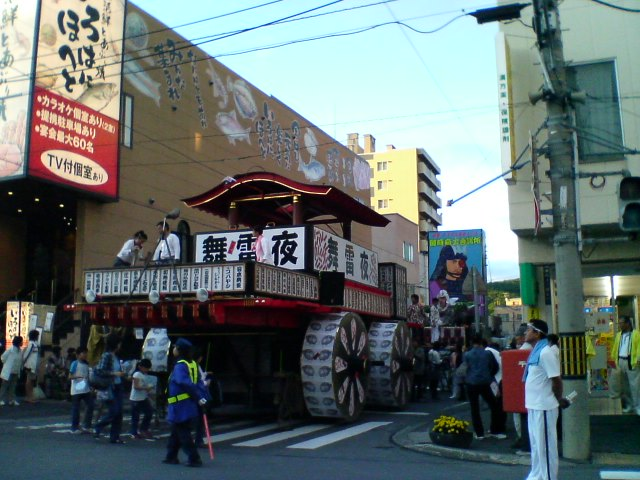
Andon yatai in Rumoi Dontou Festival on July

== Government ==
Rumoi has a mayor-council form of government with a directly elected mayor and a unicameral city council of 14 members. Rumoi, as part of Rumoi sub-prefecture, contributes one member to the Hokkaidō Prefectural Assembly. In terms of national politics, the city is part of the Hokkaidō 10th district of the lower house of the Diet of Japan.

== Economy ==
Rumoi is the central city of the Rumoi region. Its main industries are commerce, civil engineering, and seafood processing. Rumoi Port is still used for landing Pacific herring, and is the largest processing center in Japan for kazunoko herring roe.

Until the 1900s, Rumoi was a fishing town that relied solely on herring fishing, with a permanent population of just under 40,000 and over 30,000 migrant workers, and a very lively entertainment district. Since the 1910s, the development of coal mines progressed. After the depletion of herring resources in 1950, Mitsui & Co. and others began importing fish roe and other products from overseas for seafood processing companies, and lumber processing companies in the city also began importing northern timber in the 1950s, so the city's economy has been based on commerce, fishing and mining since 1950. In the 1960s, the coal mines were closed and in the 1970s, local seafood processing companies gradually lost market share to factories in Sapporo and the Tokyo metropolitan area, which are located near major consumer areas. In the 1980s, the city began to develop ports, roads, and waste disposal facilities to accommodate the unemployed leading to a rapid expansion in the issuance of city bonds. By the 1990s, wood processing companies went out of business or moved overseas, almost eliminating economic activity in the city. The government, which the city relied on, also retreated one after another, with the Rumoi Maritime Bureau moving to Asahikawa and the Rumoi Coast Guard Station integrating with Otaru. Since the 1990s, the city's economy has become government-dependent, dependent on public servants' salaries and public works. According to the 2000 census, the proportion of employees in the tertiary industry, including public servants, was overwhelmingly high, accounting for more than 70% of the total number of employees, with secondary industry accounting for 30%. Primary industry only accounted for a little over 3%.

== Education ==
Rumoi has five public elementary schools and two public junior high schools operated by the city government, and one public high school operated by the Hokkaidō Board of Education.

=== High school ===
- Hokkaido Rumoi High School

=== Junior high school ===
- Kounan Junior High School
- Rumoi Junior High School

== Transportation ==
=== Railways ===
The city does not have any passenger rail service. Before April 1, 2023, Rumoi Station, located in the city center, was the terminus of the JR Hokkaido Rumoi Main Line, which linked the city to Fukagawa. The sections between Rumoi and Ishikari-Numata, including Tōgeshita, Horonuka, Fujiyama, Ōwada and Rumoi station, were closed on March 31, 2023 due to declining passenger numbers. The Rumoi Main Line also formerly ran to Mashike, located southwest of Rumoi, until December 4, 2016, when the Mashike-Rumoi section, including Segoshi and Reuke station, was closed owing to declining passenger numbers.

=== Highways ===
Fukagawa-Rumoi Expressway connects Rumoi to Dō-Ō Expressway, a major expressway in the prefecture of Hokkaido.

- National Route 231
- National Route 232
- National Route 233

=== Seaports ===
- Port of Rumoi

== Sister city relations ==
- Ulan-Ude, Buryatia, Russia (since 5 July 1972)
- Pontianak, West Kalimantan, Indonesia
- Yingkou, Liaoning, China

== Local attractions ==
- Shokanbetsu-Teuri-Yagishiri Quasi-National Park
- Former Rumoi Saga Family Fishery, National Historic Site

== Mascot ==
Kazumo-chan, the city's mascot

Rumoi's mascot is Kazumo-chan (KAZUMOちゃん). She is a 25-year-old kind herring egg who has 1 daughter named Wakako-chan (ワカコちゃん).

== Notable ==
- Morio Agata, singer, songwriter
- Koichi Morita, composer, singer
