= Rumoi Main Line =

Railway line in Hokkaido, Japan

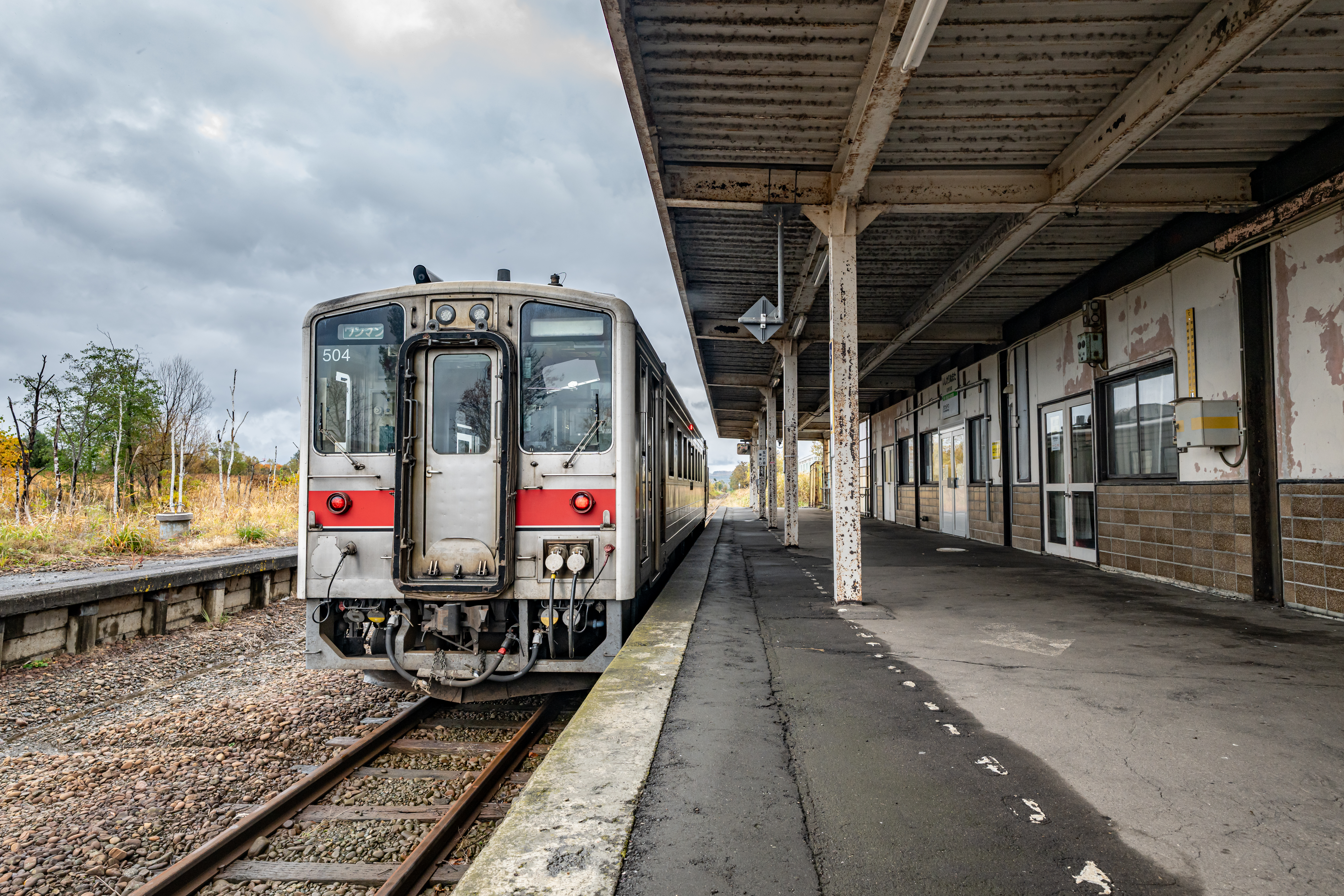
- A single KiHa 54 series DMU at Ishikari-Numata Station in October 2025

Overview
- Status: Closed
- Owner: JR Hokkaido
- Locale: JR Hokkaido
- Termini: Fukagawa; Mashike
- Stations: 20

Service
- Type: Regional rail
- Operator(s): JR Hokkaido
- Rolling stock: KiHa 54 series DMU, KiHa 150 series DMU

History
- Opened: 23 October 1910; 115 years ago
- Closed: 5 December 2016 (Rumoi–Mashike); 1 April 2023 (Ishikari-Numata–Rumoi); 1 April 2026 (entire line)

Technical
- Line length: 66.8 km (41.5 mi)
- Number of tracks: Entire line single tracked
- Character: Rural
- Track gauge: 1,067 mm (3 ft 6 in)
- Electrification: None
- Operating speed: 95 km/h (59 mph)
Route map

The Rumoi Main Line (留萌本線, Rumoi-honsen) was a Japanese railway line in Hokkaido formerly operated by Hokkaido Railway Company (JR Hokkaido) which connected Fukagawa Station in Fukagawa and Mashike Station in Mashike. Following the discontinuation of service between Rumoi and Ishikari-Numata on 1 April 2023, the Rumoi Main Line was the shortest railway line in Japan to be classified as a "main line", at just 14.4 kilometers (8.9 mi).

On 19 November 2016, JR Hokkaido's president announced plans to further rationalize the network by up to 1,237 km (769 mi), or approximately 50% of the network, including closure of the remaining section of the Rumoi Main Line (the Rumoi to Mashike section closed on 5 December 2016). This section of track from Ishikari-Numata to Rumoi was closed on 1 April 2023, with the final train running on 31 March 2023. The remaining track, between Fukagawa to Ishikari-Numata, closed on 1 April 2026, with the final train running on 31 March 2026.

== History ==
The initial section of the line, between Fukagawa and Rumoi opened on 23 October 1910, and was extended to Mashike on 5 November 1921. At its peak, the line had a length of 66.8 km (41.5 mi). The line was reclassified as a "main line" from 10 October 1931. With the privatization of Japanese National Railways (JNR) on 1 April 1987, the line came under the control of JR Hokkaido.

=== Closure plans ===
On 10 August 2015, JR Hokkaido informed the mayors of Rumoi and Mashike of its plans to close the 16.7 km (10.4 mi) section of the line from Rumoi to Mashike in 2016. In April 2016, it was officially announced that the section from Rumoi to Mashike would close, and the last service operated on 4 December of that year. The four towns and cities along the remaining line – Rumoi, Numata, Chippubetsu, and Fukagawa – began discussions with JR Hokkaido regarding the line's future, but Rumoi withdrew from the council due to having automobile infrastructure in place (due to the opening of the Rumoi Interchange on the Fukagawa-Rumoi Expressway in 2020, after which only 60 city residents used the train).

In September 2022, JR Hokkaido submitted a proposal to the Ministry of Land, Infrastructure, Transport and Tourism to close an additional 35.7 km (22.2 mi) between Ishikari-Numata and Rumoi. The closure was approved on 9 December 2022, end-of-service was announced for 31 March 2023, and the closure occurred on 1 April 2023.

Although the rest of the municipalities proposed that the rest of the line remains open, the proposal failed when JR Hokkaido demanded 300,000,000 yen yearly to keep the line open. As a result, the remaining 14.4 km (8.9 mi) section to Fukagawa closed on 1 April 2026. On the final timetable revision on 14 March 2026, through service via the Hakodate Main Line was abolished.

After closure, the Hidaka Main Line became the shortest "main line" in Japan, at 30.5 km.

=== Stations ===
No.	Picture	Station name	Japanese	Between (km)	Distance (km)	Transfers	Location
↓ Closed on 1 April 2026 ↓
A24		Fukagawa	深川	--	0.0	■ Hakodate Main Line ■ ~~Shinmei Line~~ (Closed 1995)	Fukagawa
		Kita-Ichiyan	北一已	3.8	3.8		Fukagawa
		Chippubetsu	秩父別	5.0	8.8		Chippubetsu, Uryū District
		Kita-Chippubetsu	北秩父別	2.4	11.2		Chippubetsu, Uryū District
		Ishikari-Numata	石狩沼田	3.2	14.4	■ ~~Sasshō Line~~ (Partially closed 1972)	Numata, Uryū District
↓Closed on 1 April 2023 ↓
		Mappu	真布	3.4	17.8		Numata, Uryū District
		Ebishima	恵比島	2.9	20.7		Numata, Uryū District
		Tōgeshita	峠下	7.6	28.3		Rumoi
		Horonuka	幌糠	6.2	34.5		Rumoi
		Fujiyama	藤山	5.5	40.0		Rumoi
		Ōwada	大和田	4.2	44.2		Rumoi
		Rumoi	留萌	5.9	50.1	■ ~~Haboro Line~~ (Closed 1987)	Rumoi
↓ Closed on 5 December 2016 ↓
		Segoshi	瀬越	2.1	52.2		Rumoi
		Reuke	礼受	4.0	56.2		Rumoi
		Afun	阿分	1.3	57.5		Mashike, Mashike District
		Nobusha	信砂	2.7	60.2		Mashike, Mashike District
		Shaguma	舎熊	0.8	61.0		Mashike, Mashike District
		Shumombetsu	朱文別	1.7	62.7		Mashike, Mashike District
		Hashibetsu	箸別	1.3	64.0		Mashike, Mashike District
		Mashike	増毛	2.8	66.8		Mashike, Mashike District
