= Tomamae, Hokkaido =

Tomamae 苫前町
- Town
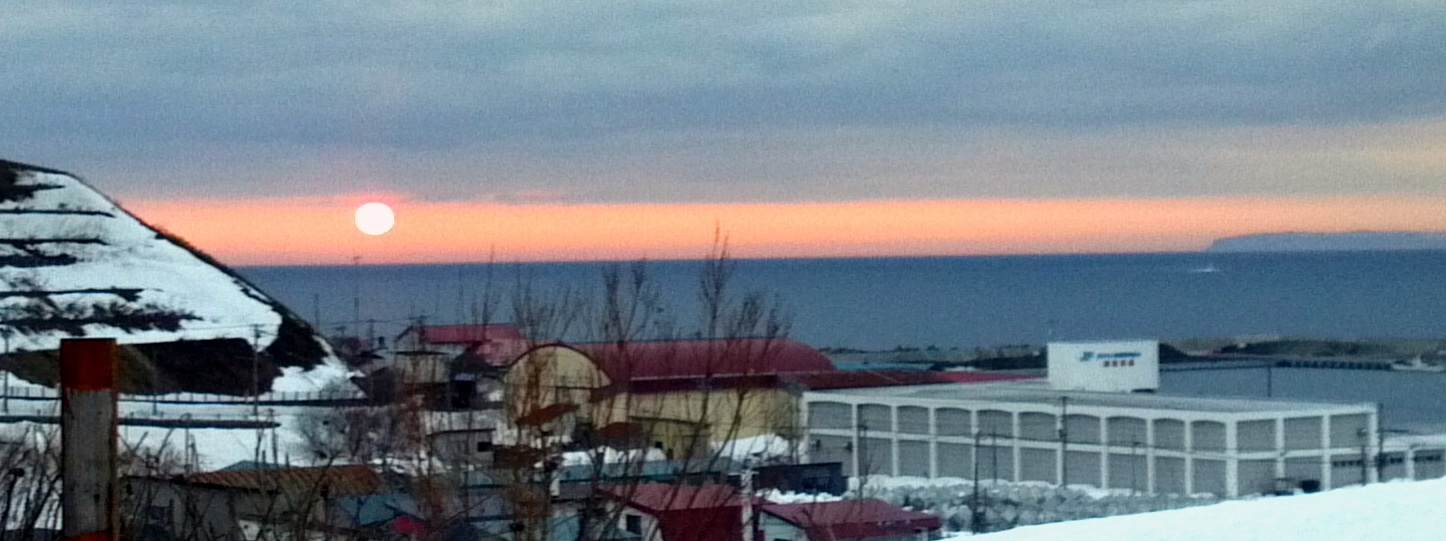
- Sunset over Tomamae

- Flag Seal
- Location of Tomamae in Hokkaido (Rumoi Subprefecture)

- Location in Japan
- Coordinates: 44°18′32″N 141°39′11″E
- Country: Japan
- Region: Hokkaido
- Prefecture: Hokkaido (Rumoi Subprefecture)
- District: Tomamae

Area
  - Total: 454.60 km^{2} (175.52 sq mi)

Population (January 31, 2025)
  - Total: 2,659
  - Density: 5.849/km^{2} (15.15/sq mi)
- Time zone: UTC+09:00 (JST)
- City hall address: 37-1 Asahi, Tomamae-cho, Tomamae-gun, Hokkaido 078-3792
- Website: Official website
- Symbols
- Flower: Corydalis ambigua
- Tree: Japanese rowan

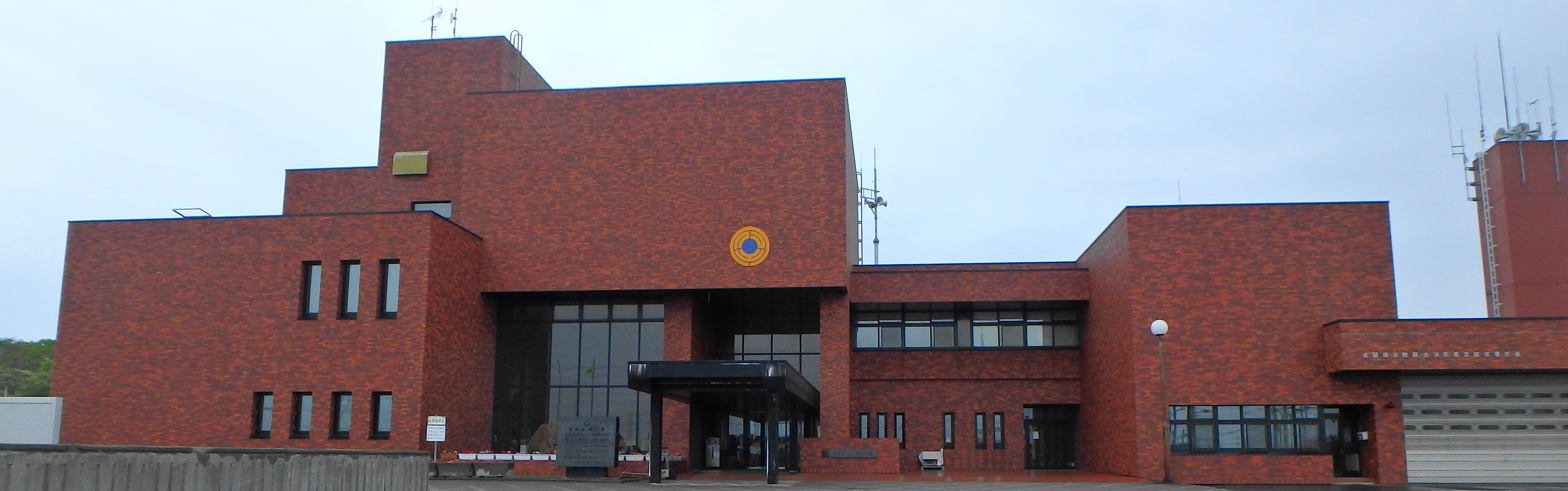
Tomamae town hall

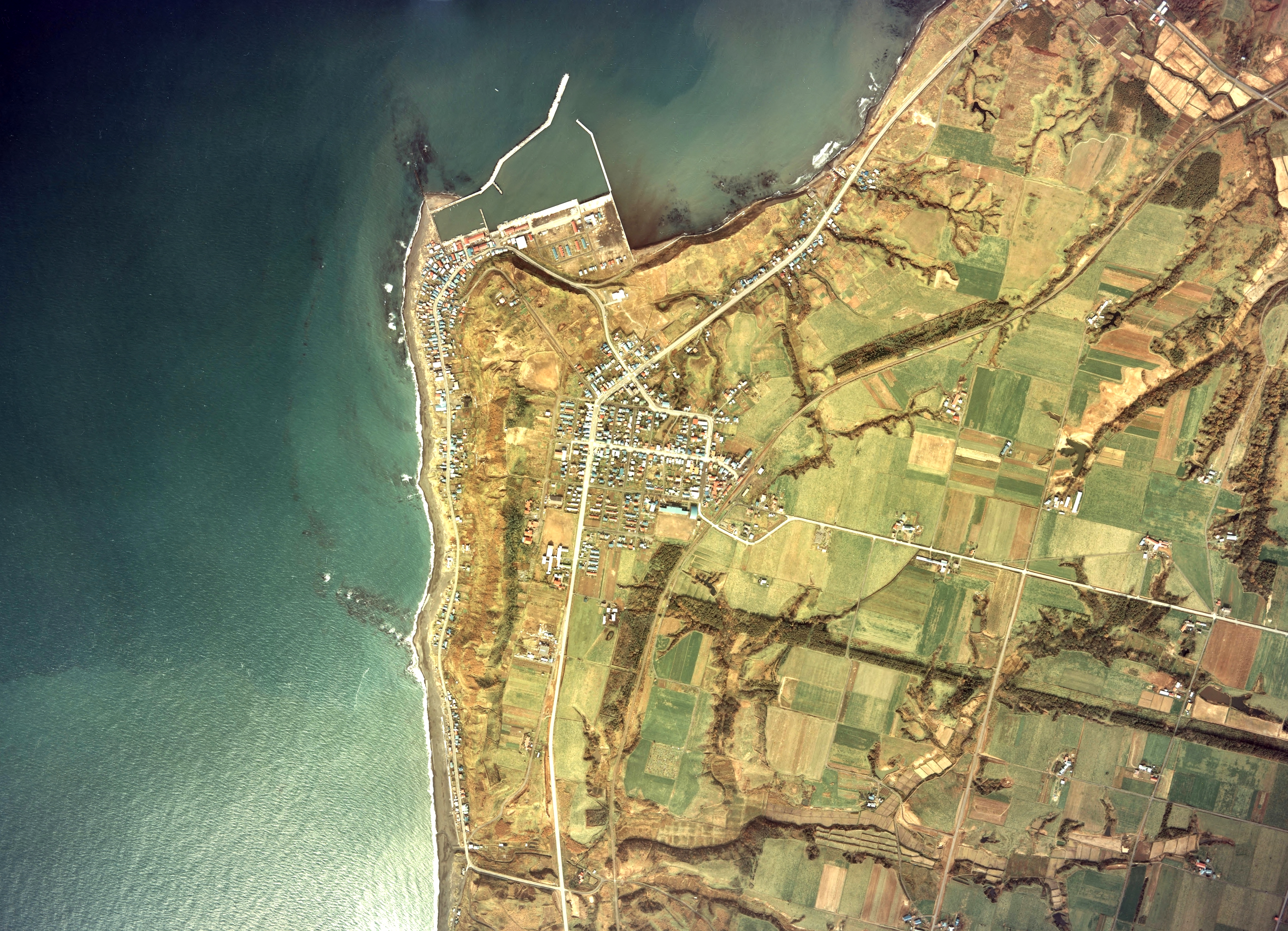
Port of Tomamae

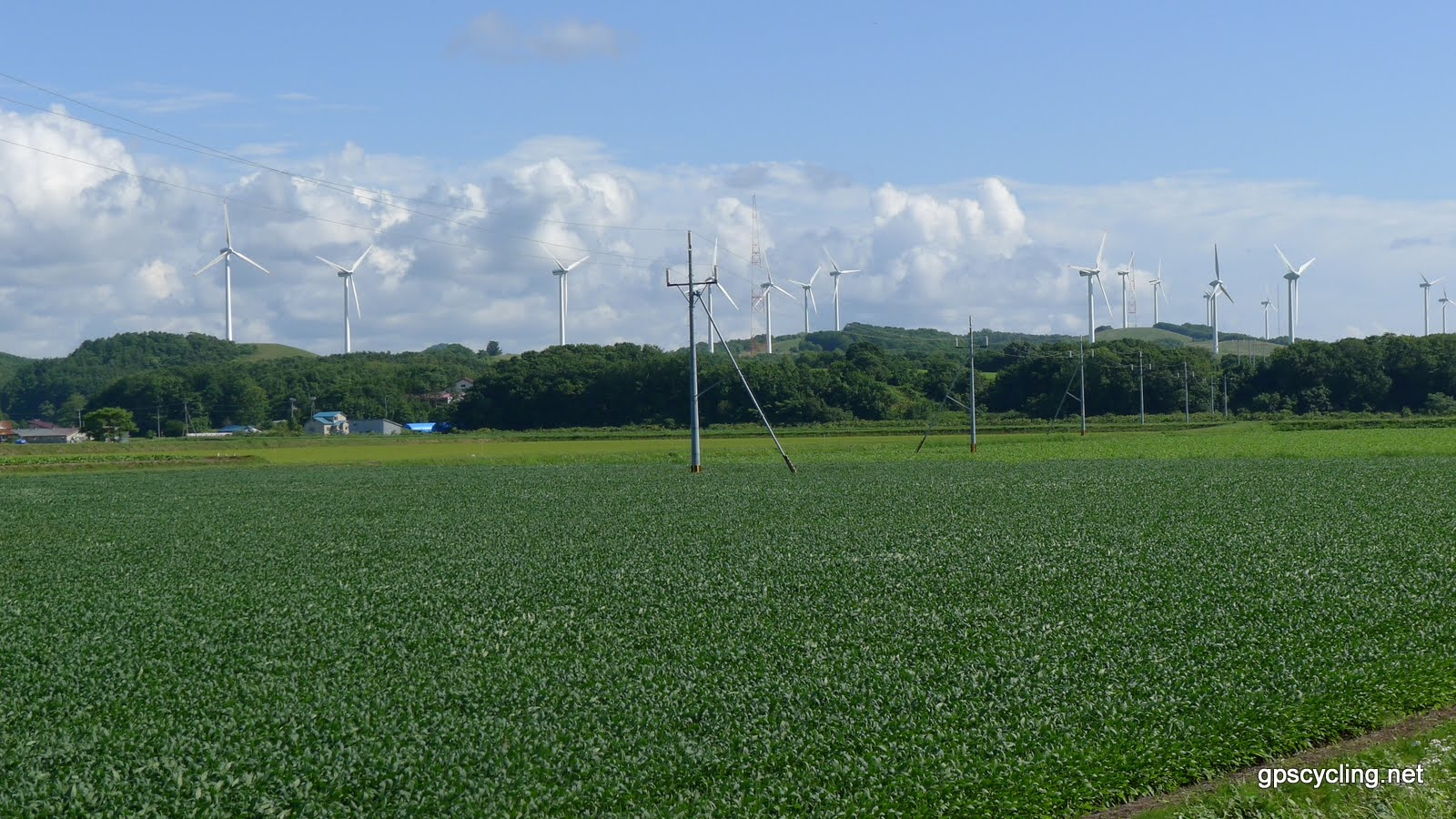
Tomamae wind farm

Tomamae (苫前町, Tomamae-chō) is a town located in Rumoi Subprefecture, Hokkaido, Japan. As of 31 December 2024, the town had an estimated population of 2,659 in 1,428 households, and a population density of 5.8 people per km^{2}. The total area of the town is 454.60 km^{2} (175.52 sq mi).

== Geography ==
Tomamae is located in the part of Rumoi jurisdiction in northern Hokkaido, facing the Sea of Japan to the west.

=== Neighbouring municipalities ===
- Hokkaido
  - Haboro
  - Obira

== Climate ==
Tomamae has a Humid continental climate (Köppen Dfb) characterized by cold summers and cold winters with heavy snowfall. The average annual temperature in Tomamae is 6.8 °C. The average annual rainfall is 1207 mm with September as the wettest month. The temperatures are highest on average in August, at around 20.5 °C, and lowest in January, at around -6.5 °C.

=== Demographics ===
Per Japanese census data, the population of Tomamae is as shown below. The town is in a long period of sustained population loss.

Historical population
Year	Pop.	±%
1940	8,101	—
1950	11,212	+38.4%
1960	10,898	−2.8%
1970	8,544	−21.6%
1980	6,528	−23.6%
1990	5,251	−19.6%
2000	4,645	−11.5%
2010	3,657	−21.3%
2020	2,936	−19.7%

== History ==
The area of Tomamae has been inhabited since the Jōmon period, and was the site of a kotan was built by the Ainu people. When Matsumae Domain advanced into the area in the Keichō era (1596–1615), a trading settlement was built. In 1786, the Tomamae Shrine, a Shinto shrine was constructed. The village of Tomamae was created in 1880, and separated from Haboro in 1894. It was raised to town status on October 1, 1948.

The town (and region in general) are noteworthy in Hokkaido for having a large amount of bear sightings, dating back to the Sankebetsu brown bear incident in 1915. Bears weighing over 300kg have been captured in Tomamae in recent years.

== Government ==
Tomamae has a mayor-council form of government with a directly elected mayor and a unicameral town council of eight members. Tomamae, as part of Rumoi sub-prefecture, contributes one member to the Hokkaidō Prefectural Assembly. In terms of national politics, the town is part of the Hokkaidō 10th district of the lower house of the Diet of Japan.

== Economy ==
The local economy of Tomamae is centered on commercial fishing and agriculture. The town also operates it own wind power station, producing (in 2024) a surplus of 575% more power than is consumed in the town and providing a substantial incoming source to the town government.

== Education ==
Tomamae has two public elementary schools and one public junior high school operated by the town government, and one public high school operated by the Hokkaidō Board of Education.

== Transportation ==
=== Railways ===
After the closure of the Japan National Railway Haboro Line in 1987, the town has not had any passenger rail service.

=== Highways ===
- National Route 232
- National Route 239

== Mascot ==
Tomao, the town's mascot

Tomamae's mascot is Kumada Tomao (くまだ とまお), better known as Tomao-kun (とまおくん). He is a 7-year-old brown bear cub. He wears a hat that has two badges (a windmill badge and a badge dedicated to agricultural and seafood products).

== See also ==
- Sankebetsu brown bear incident
