= Ebishima Station =

Former railway station in Numata, Hokkaido, Japan

Ebishima Station 恵比島駅
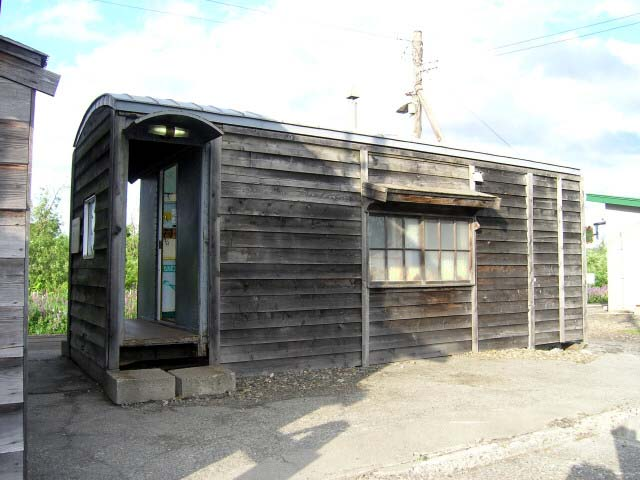

General information
- Location: Numata, Uryū District, Hokkaidō; Japan
- Coordinates: 43°51′04″N 141°52′54″E
- Operated by: Hokkaido Railway Company
- Line: Rumoi Main Line
Location

Ebishima Station (恵比島駅, Ebishima-eki) was a train station in Numata, Uryū District, Hokkaidō, Japan.

The station was closed on 1 April 2023 owing to poor patronage.

== Lines ==
- Hokkaido Railway Company
  - Rumoi Main Line

== Adjacent stations ==
«	Service	»
Rumoi Main Line
Mappu	Local	Tōgeshita
