= Kita-Chippubetsu Station =

Railway station in Chippubetsu, Hokkaido, Japan

Coordinates: 43.7894°N 141.9612°E

Kita-Chippubetsu Station 北秩父別駅
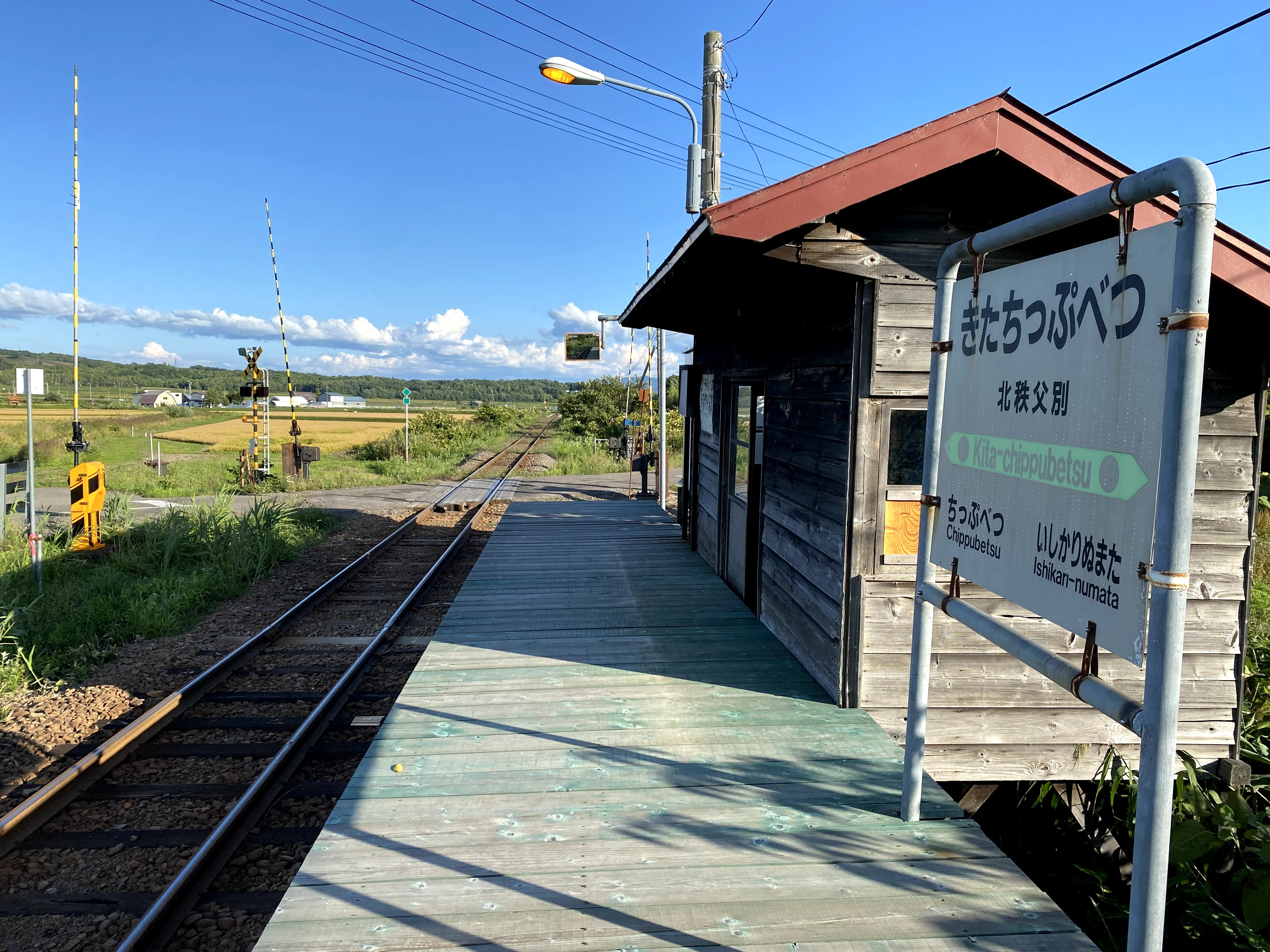
- The station building in 2021

General information
- Location: Chippubetsu, Uryū District, Hokkaidō, Japan. Japan
- Operator: Hokkaido Railway Company
- Line: Rumoi Main Line
- Platforms: 1 Side platform
- Tracks: 1

Construction
- Structure type: At-grade
- Accessible: No
Location
- Location within Japan

Kita-Chippubetsu Station (北秩父別駅, Kita-Chippubetsu-eki) was a train station in Chippubetsu, Uryū District, Hokkaidō, Japan.

The station was closed on 1 April 2026 along with the abolishment of the entire Rumoi Main Line.

== Lines ==
- Hokkaido Railway Company
  - Rumoi Main Line

== Adjacent stations ==
«	Service	»
Rumoi Main Line
Chippubetsu	Local	Ishikari-Numata
