= Mappu Station =

Former railway station in Numata, Hokkaido, Japan

Mappu Station 真布駅
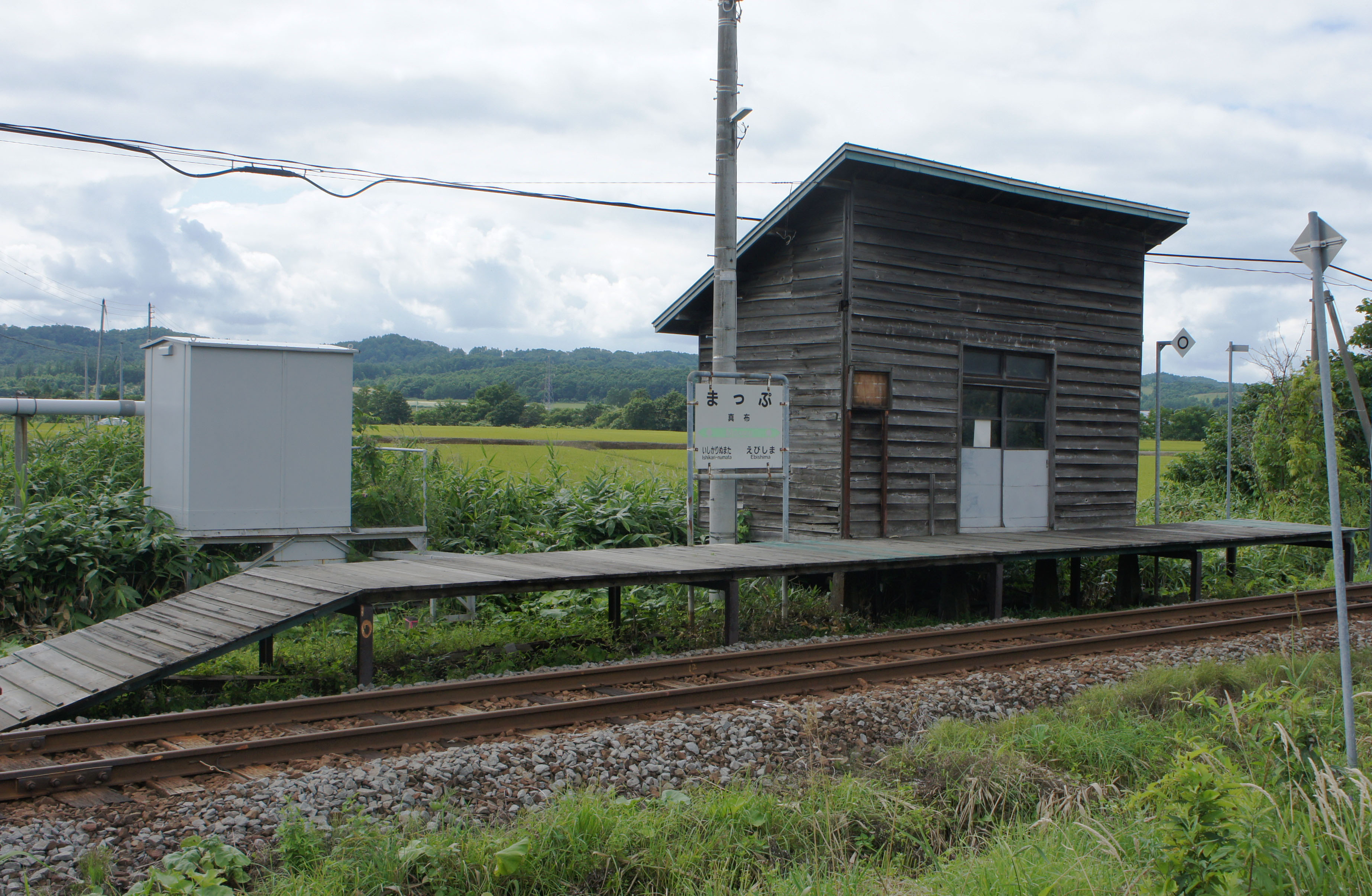

General information
- Location: Numata, Uryū District, Hokkaidō; Japan
- Coordinates: 43°49′58″N 141°54′25″E
- Operated by: Hokkaido Railway Company
- Line: Rumoi Main Line
Location

Mappu Station (真布駅, Mappu-eki) was a train station in Numata, Uryū District, Hokkaidō, Japan.

The station was closed on 1 April 2023 owing to poor patronage.

== Lines ==
- Hokkaido Railway Company
  - Rumoi Main Line

== Adjacent stations ==
«	Service	»
Rumoi Main Line
Ishikari-Numata	Local	Ebishima
