= Obira, Hokkaido =

Obira 小平町
- Town
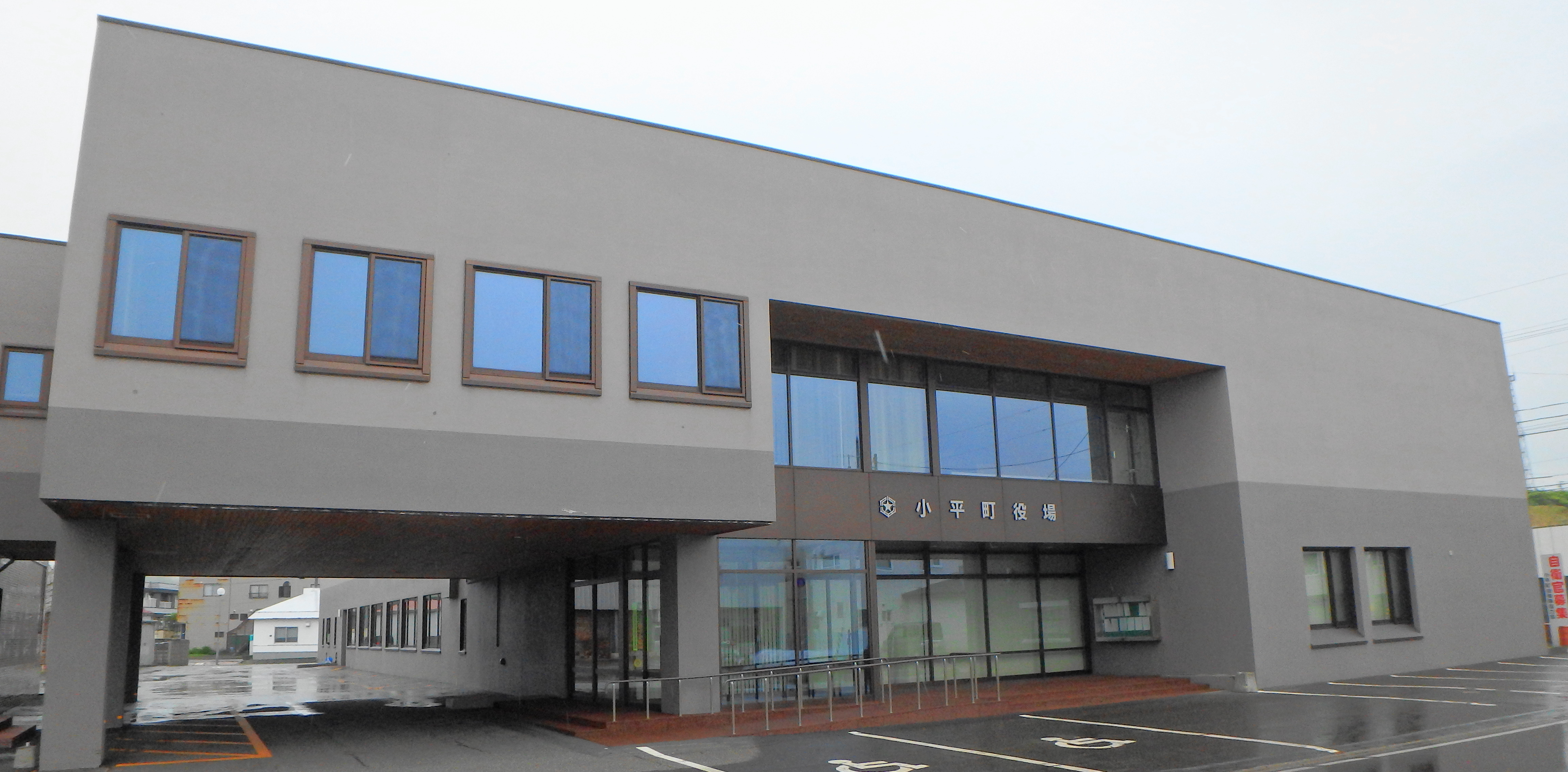
- Obira town hall

- Flag Seal
- Location of Obira in Hokkaido (Rumoi Subprefecture)

- Location in Japan
- Coordinates: 44°0′56″N 141°39′46″E
- Country: Japan
- Region: Hokkaido
- Prefecture: Hokkaido (Rumoi Subprefecture)
- District: Rumoi

Area
  - Total: 627.22 km^{2} (242.17 sq mi)

Population (31 January 2025)
  - Total: 2,660
  - Density: 4.24/km^{2} (11.0/sq mi)
- Time zone: UTC+09:00 (JST)
- City hall address: 216 Obiramachi, Obira-cho, Rumoi-gun, Hokkaido 078-3392
- Climate: Dfb
- Website: Official website
- Symbols
- Flower: Azalea
- Tree: Japanese yew

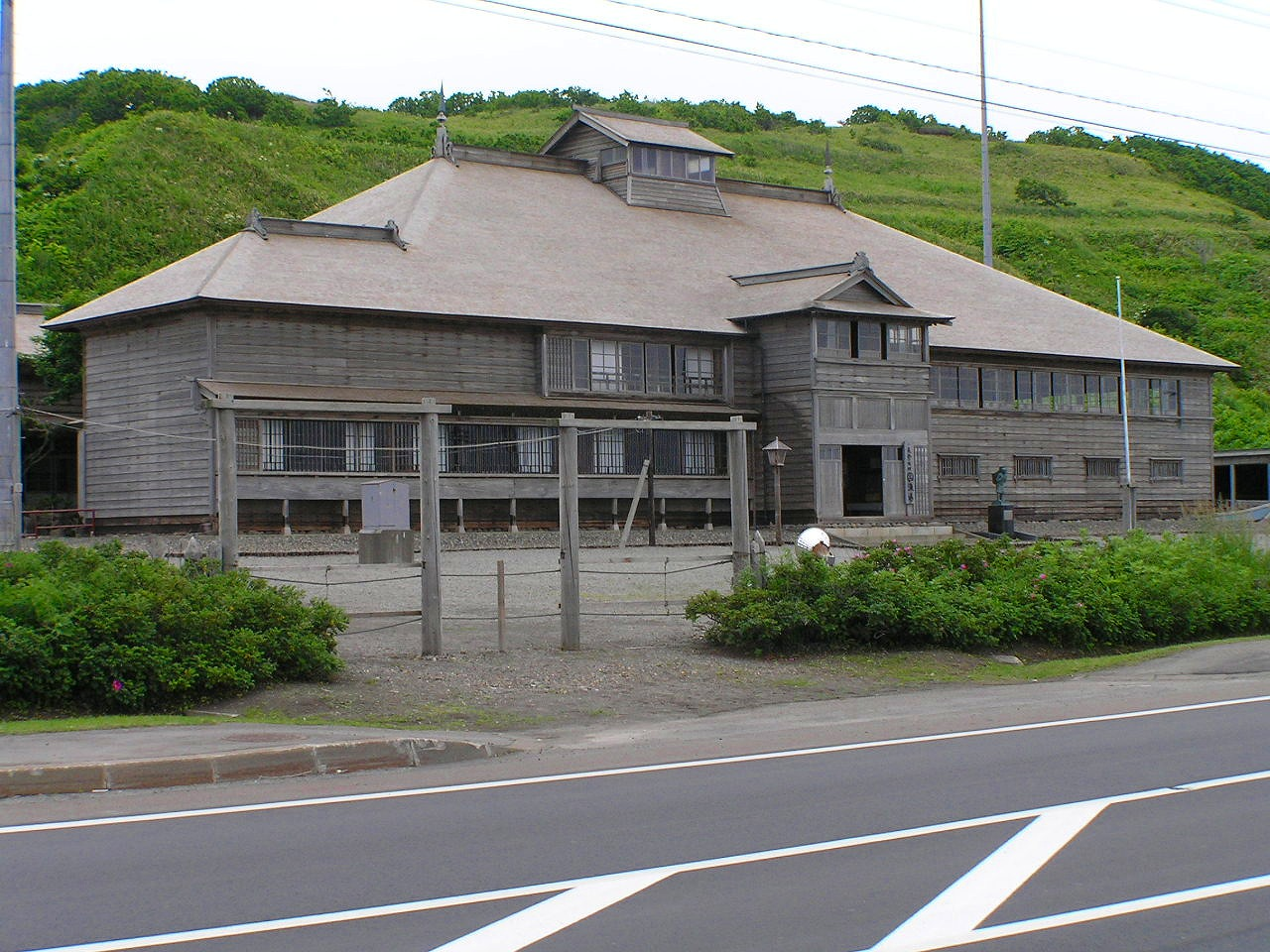
former Handa Family Banya

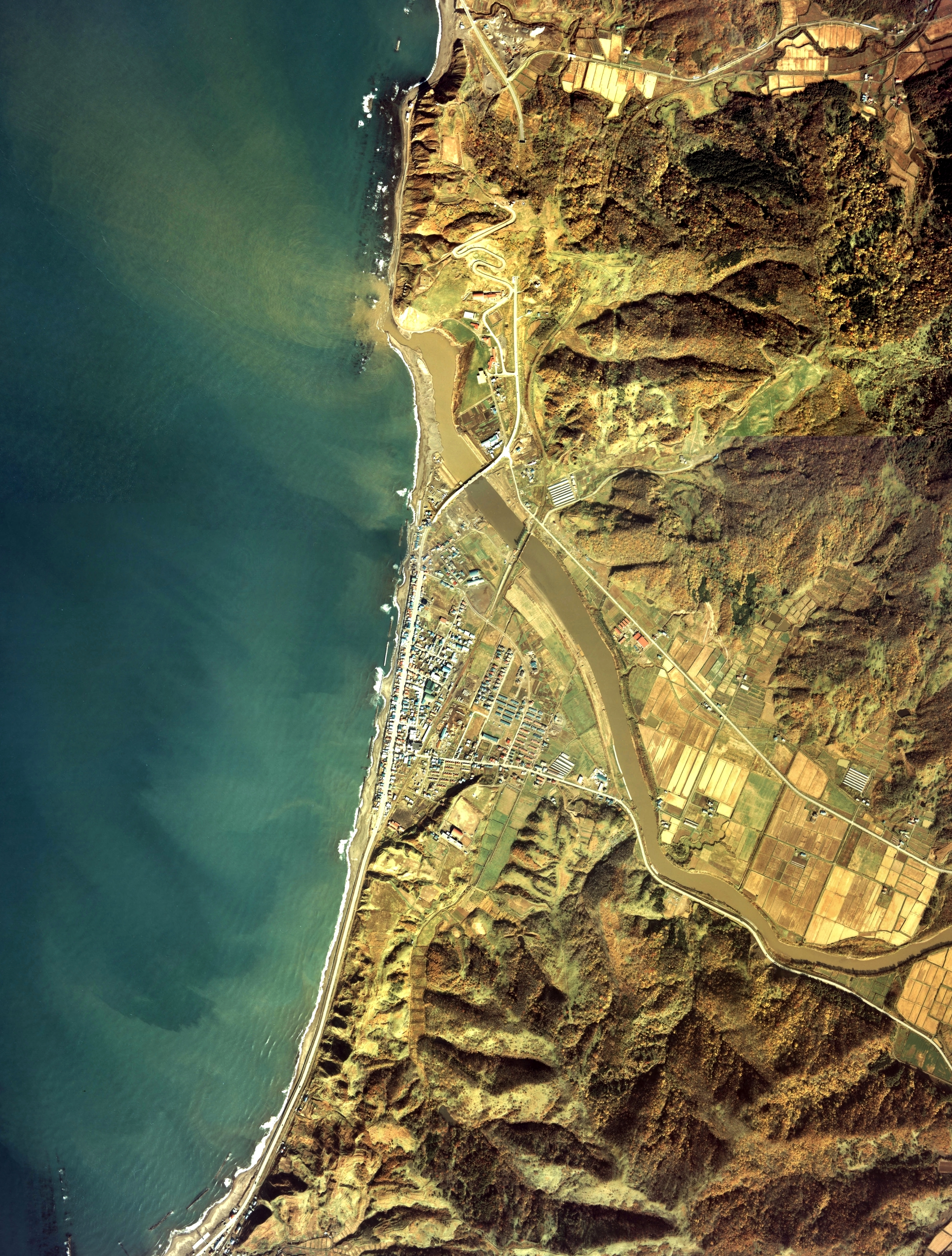
Obira town center

Obira (小平町, Obira-chō) is a town located in Rumoi Subprefecture, Hokkaido, Japan.

== Population ==
As of 31 January 2025, the town had an estimated population of 2,660 in 1,499 households, and a population density of 4.2 people per km^{2}. The total area of the town is 627.22 km^{2} (242.17 sq mi).

=== Historical demographics ===
Per Japanese census data, the population of Obira is as shown below. The town is in a long period of sustained population loss.

Historical population
Year	Pop.	±%
1940	9,651	—
1950	17,046	+76.6%
1960	14,711	−13.7%
1970	8,471	−42.4%
1980	6,474	−23.6%
1990	5,334	−17.6%
2000	4,566	−14.4%
2010	3,720	−18.5%
2020	2,994	−19.5%

== Geography ==
Obira is located in the Rumoi jurisdiction in northern Hokkaido, bordered by the Sea of Japan to the west.

=== Neighbouring municipalities ===
- Hokkaido
  - Rumoi
  - Tomamae
  - Fukagawa
  - Numata
  - Horokanai

== History ==
Obira began as a settlement by Matsumae Domain for herring and salmon fishing in 1782. The Hanada family guardhouse was built in 1905. During the Meiji period and into the early Showa period, the area was part of the Rumoi coal fields. The last coal mine closed in the 1960s. Obira was raised to town status in 1966.

== Government ==
Obira has a mayor-council form of government with a directly elected mayor and a unicameral town council of eight members. Obira, as part of Rumoi sub-prefecture, contributes one member to the Hokkaidō Prefectural Assembly. In terms of national politics, the town is part of the Hokkaidō 10th district of the lower house of the Diet of Japan.

== Economy ==
The main industries of Obira are commercial fishing and agriculture. In addition to rice, various vegetables such as potatoes, peppers, and corn are grown. Flowers such as bellflowers have been actively cultivated in Obira due to the cool climate, and Japanese black beef is also shipped. In terms of seafood, scallops are cultivated and seed scallops are shipped to production areas around the country. Octopus are also landed. Sea urchins and sea cucumbers can be caught for a short period in summer.

== Education ==
Obira has two public elementary schools and one public junior high school operated by the town government, and one public high school operated by the Hokkaidō Board of Education.

== Climate ==
Obira has a Humid continental climate (Köppen Dfb) characterized by cold summers and cold winters with heavy snowfall. The average annual temperature in Obira is 7.2 °C. The average annual rainfall is 1227 mm with September as the wettest month. The temperatures are highest on average in August, at around 20.9 °C, and lowest in January, at around -5.9 °C.

Climate data for Tappu, Obira, elevation 30 m (98 ft), (1991−2020 normals, extremes 1977−present)
Month	Jan	Feb	Mar	Apr	May	Jun	Jul	Aug	Sep	Oct	Nov	Dec	Year
Record high °C (°F)	7.4 (45.3)	10.3 (50.5)	15.5 (59.9)	25.4 (77.7)	32.5 (90.5)	34.3 (93.7)	36.5 (97.7)	38.7 (101.7)	32.1 (89.8)	24.9 (76.8)	20.9 (69.6)	11.4 (52.5)	38.7 (101.7)
Mean daily maximum °C (°F)	−2.0 (28.4)	−1.1 (30.0)	3.1 (37.6)	9.7 (49.5)	17.3 (63.1)	21.8 (71.2)	25.5 (77.9)	26.0 (78.8)	22.0 (71.6)	15.1 (59.2)	6.6 (43.9)	−0.1 (31.8)	12.0 (53.6)
Daily mean °C (°F)	−6.4 (20.5)	−5.9 (21.4)	−1.6 (29.1)	4.2 (39.6)	11.0 (51.8)	15.8 (60.4)	19.9 (67.8)	20.5 (68.9)	15.9 (60.6)	9.2 (48.6)	2.7 (36.9)	−3.5 (25.7)	6.8 (44.3)
Mean daily minimum °C (°F)	−11.8 (10.8)	−12.0 (10.4)	−7.1 (19.2)	−1.1 (30.0)	4.6 (40.3)	10.5 (50.9)	15.2 (59.4)	16.0 (60.8)	10.6 (51.1)	4.1 (39.4)	−1.0 (30.2)	−7.3 (18.9)	1.7 (35.1)
Record low °C (°F)	−29.7 (−21.5)	−30.0 (−22.0)	−25.0 (−13.0)	−14.2 (6.4)	−4.1 (24.6)	−0.6 (30.9)	4.9 (40.8)	5.3 (41.5)	0.1 (32.2)	−5.2 (22.6)	−15.4 (4.3)	−28.6 (−19.5)	−30.0 (−22.0)
Average precipitation mm (inches)	155.2 (6.11)	106.7 (4.20)	90.9 (3.58)	74.2 (2.92)	88.0 (3.46)	73.9 (2.91)	148.1 (5.83)	167.8 (6.61)	172.0 (6.77)	178.5 (7.03)	202.9 (7.99)	198.9 (7.83)	1,653.6 (65.10)
Average rainy days	22.6	18.9	17.6	12.6	12.2	10.6	11.7	13.0	14.7	17.7	21.5	25.2	198.3
Mean monthly sunshine hours	40.5	57.7	107.6	159.1	195.9	171.5	162.3	159.3	156.0	114.4	44.6	26.8	1,399.4
Source 1: JMA
Source 2: JMA

== Transportation ==
=== Railways ===
After the closure of the Japan National Railway Haboro Line in 1987, the town has not had any passenger rail service.

=== Highways ===
- National Route 232

== Local attractions ==
- Hanada Family Banya, Former herring fishery, National Important Cultural Property

== Mascot ==
Obimaru, the town's mascot

Obira's mascot is Obimaru (おびまる) who is a curious and kind heart superhero that resembles a bull. Legend has it that this figure was formed from a bull, a melon, an octopus, two scallops, two fishes and a rice bowl on 12 August 2014. No one knows its gender yet. It can eat anything that is locally produced especially melon, beef, octopus, scallops, herring and rice. His charm point is a red star on his forehead to show its status has mascot of the town.

== Notable people ==
- Masashi Abe, Nordic combined skier and Olympic champions
