= Fukagawa Station =

Railway station in Fukagawa, Hokkaido, Japan

Fukagawa Station 深川駅
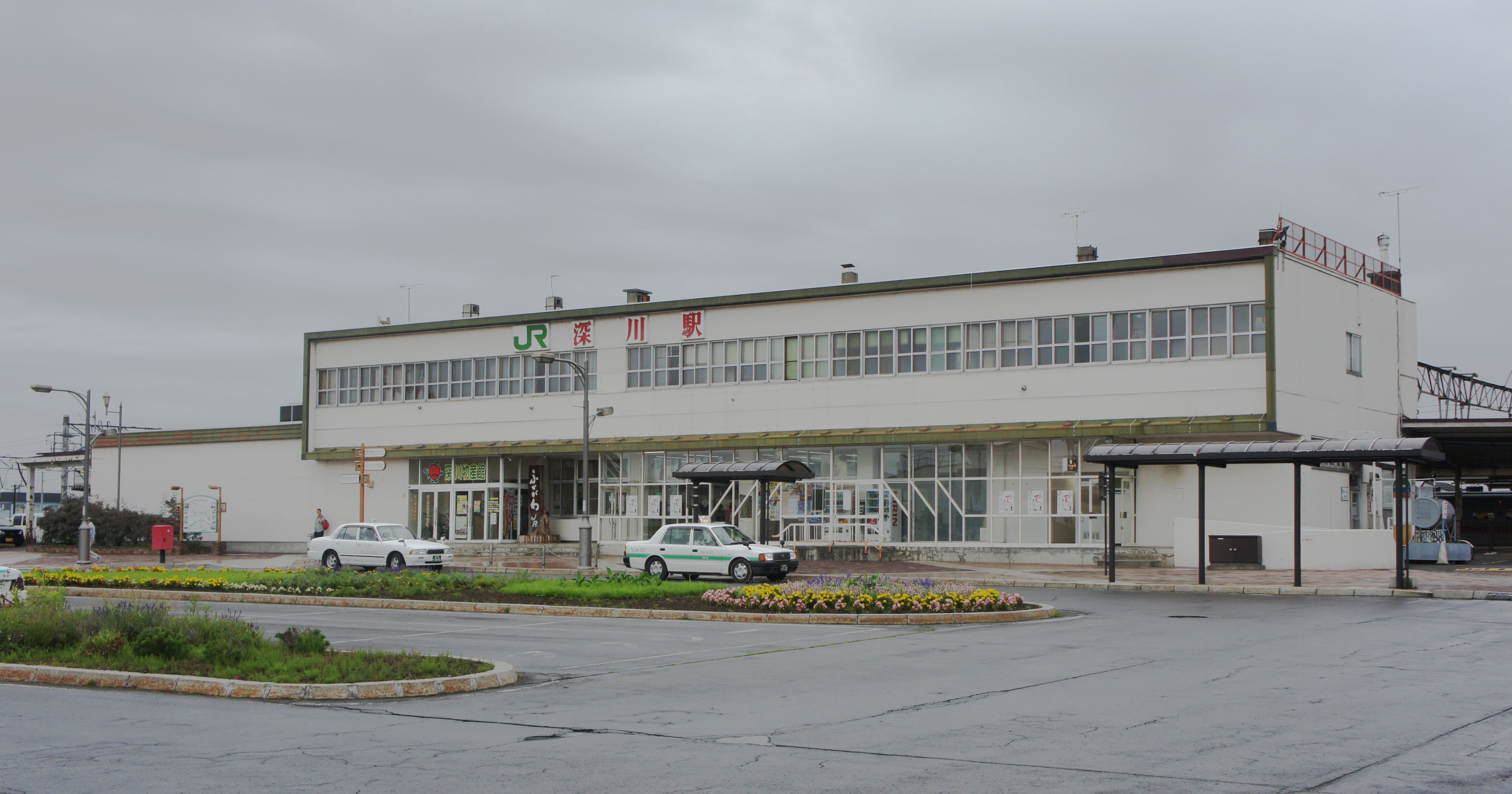
- Fukagawa Station in July 2017

General information
- Location: 1-9-4 Fukagawa-shi, Hokkaido; Japan
- Coordinates: 43°43′16″N 142°2′30″E
- Operator: JR Hokkaido
- Line: Hakodate Main Line
- Platforms: 2 side platforms + 1 island platform
- Tracks: 4

Construction
- Structure type: At grade

Other information
- Station code: A24
- Website: Official website

History
- Opened: 16 July 1898; 128 years ago

Services
Preceding station	JR Hokkaido	Following station
Local
Moseushi towards Hakodate	Hakodate Main Line Local	Osamunai towards Asahikawa
Limited Express
Takikawa towards Sapporo	Sōya	Asahikawa towards Wakkanai
Takikawa towards Sapporo	Okhotsk	Asahikawa towards Abashiri
Takikawa towards Sapporo	Lilac	Asahikawa Terminus
Takikawa towards Sapporo	Kamui	Asahikawa Terminus

Former services
Preceding station	JR Hokkaido	Following station
Kita-Ichiyan towards Rumoi	Rumoi Main Line Local	Terminus
Location
- Location within Japan

Fukagawa Station (深川駅, Fukagawa-eki) is a railway station in Fukagawa, Hokkaido, Japan, operated by the Hokkaido Railway Company (JR Hokkaido). The station is served by the Hakodate Main Line. The Shinmei Line and Rumoi Main Line previously connected to this station before their respective closures in 1995 and 2026.

== History ==
The station opened on 16 July 1898. With the privatization of Japanese National Railways (JNR) on 1 April 1987, the station came under the control of JR Hokkaido.

The Shinmei Line, which connected this station to Nayoro, closed in 1995.

The Rumoi Main Line, which connected this station to the termini Ishikari-Numata (prior to 2026), Rumoi (prior to 2023), and Mashike (prior to 2016), was fully closed on 1 April 2026.

== Station layout ==
The station has three ground-level platforms (two side platforms and one island platform) serving four tracks. The station as of 2026 is staffed with a Midori no Madoguchi ticket office.

=== Platforms ===
1	■ Hakodate Main Line	for Takikawa, Iwamizawa, and Sapporo
3	■ Hakodate Main Line	for Asahikawa, Abashiri, and Wakkanai
4	■ Hakodate Main Line	for Asahikawa (Local services)
6	■ Not in use	

== See also ==
- List of railway stations in Japan
