= Rumoi Station =

Former railway station in Rumoi, Hokkaido, Japan

Rumoi Station 留萌駅
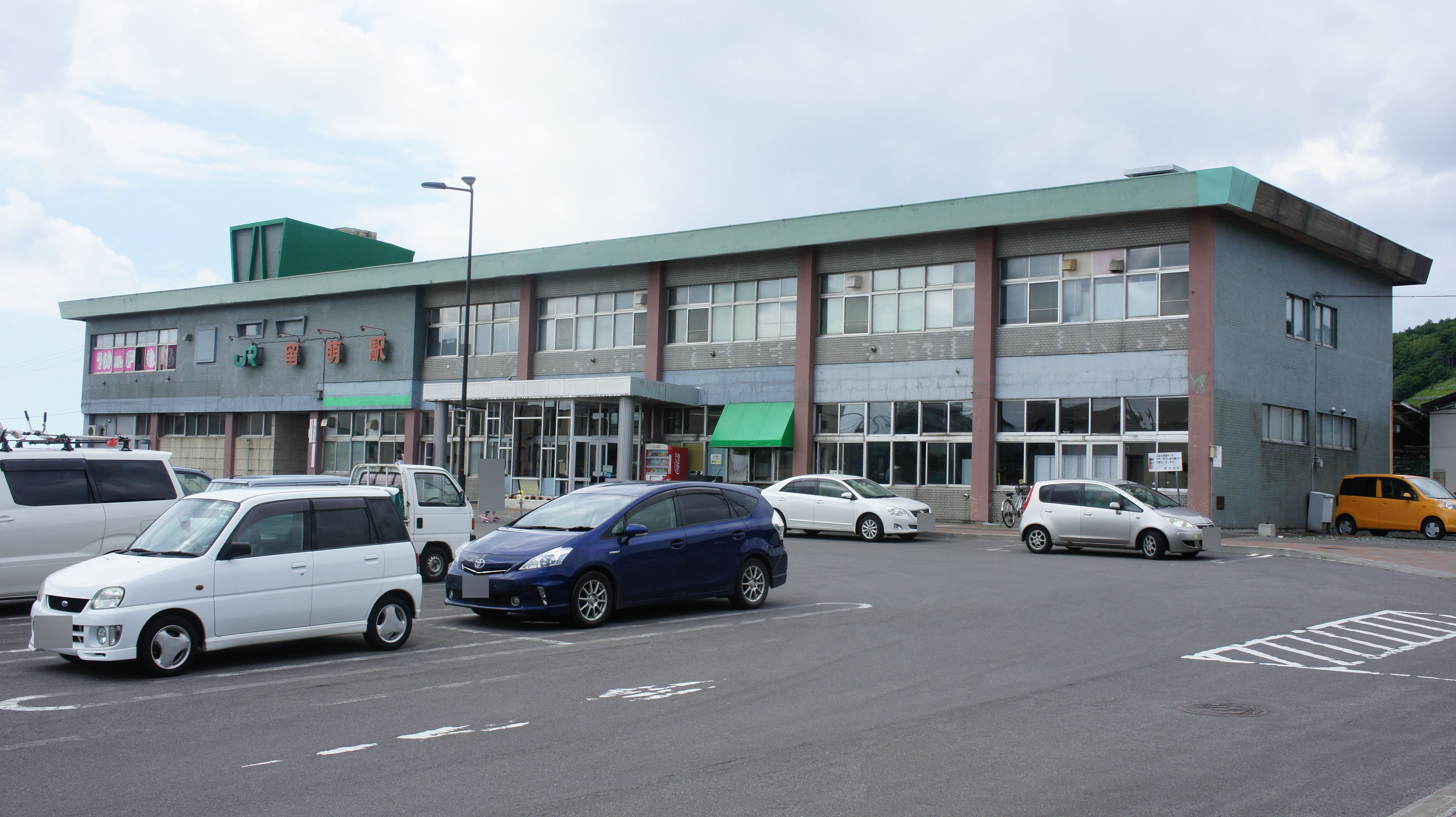

General information
- Location: Rumoi, Hokkaido; Japan
- Coordinates: 43.9426°N 141.6522°E
- Operated by: Hokkaido Railway Company
- Lines: Rumoi Main Line (closed); Haboro Line (closed)
Location

Rumoi Station (留萌駅, Rumoi-eki) was a railway station on the Rumoi Main Line in Rumoi, Hokkaido, Japan, operated by Hokkaido Railway Company (JR Hokkaido).

== Lines ==
After the closure of the section of the line between Rumoi and Mashike on 4 December 2016 up until the closure of the line between Rumoi and Ishikari-Numata, Rumoi Station was the terminus of the Rumoi Main Line and Haboro Line

== Adjacent stations ==
«	Service	»
Rumoi Main Line
Ōwada	Local	Segoshi

== History ==
On 10 August 2015, JR Hokkaido announced its plans to close the 16.7 km section of the line beyond Rumoi to Mashike in 2016. In April 2016, it was officially announced that the section from Rumoi to Mashike would be closing in December 2016, with the last services operating on 4 December. On April 1, 2023, the section between Ishikari-Numata and this station closed.

== See also ==
- List of railway stations in Japan
