= Ishikari-Numata Station =

Railway station in Numata, Hokkaido, Japan

Coordinates: 43°48′36.18″N 141°56′3.22″E

Ishikari-Numata Station 石狩沼田駅
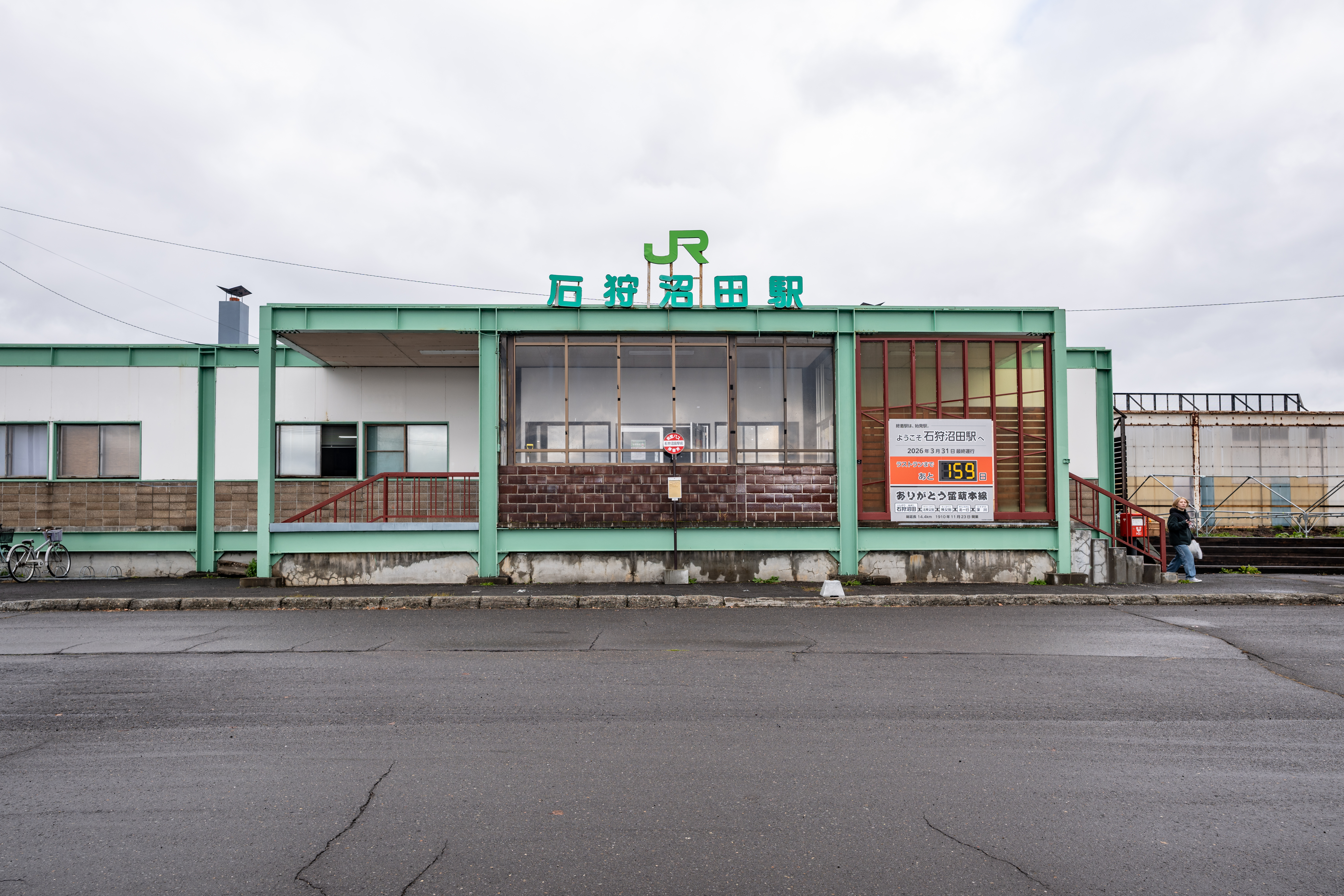
- The station building in 2025

General information
- Location: Numata, Uryū District, Hokkaidō; Japan
- Operator: Hokkaido Railway Company
- Line: Rumoi Main Line
- Platforms: 1 Side platform
- Tracks: 1

Construction
- Structure type: At-grade
- Accessible: No

History
- Opened: 23 November 1910
- Closed: 1 April 2026
- Former names: Numata Station
Location
- Location within Japan

Ishikari-Numata Station (石狩沼田駅, Ishikari-Numata-eki) was a train station in Numata, Uryū District, Hokkaidō, Japan.

== History ==
The station opened on 23 November 1910 as Numata Station when the Rumoi Main Line opened the section between Fukagawa Station and this station. The station was also the terminus of the Sasshō Line from 10 October 1931 to 19 June 1972.

On 1 April 2023, the station became the western terminus of the Rumoi Main Line with the closure of the line west to Rumoi Station.

The station was closed on 1 April 2026 along with the abolishment of the entire Rumoi Main Line.

== Station layout ==
The station has a side platform and an unused island platform, which has not been in use since 1994.

After the 2023 closure of the Rumoi Main Line section beyond Ishikari-Numata, the station was upgraded to allow trains to turn back to Fukagawa.

=== Platforms ===
1	■ Rumoi Main Line	for Fukagawa
2/3	■ Rumoi Main Line	Not in use

== Adjacent stations ==
«	Service	»
Rumoi Main Line
Kita-Chippubetsu	Local	Mappu
