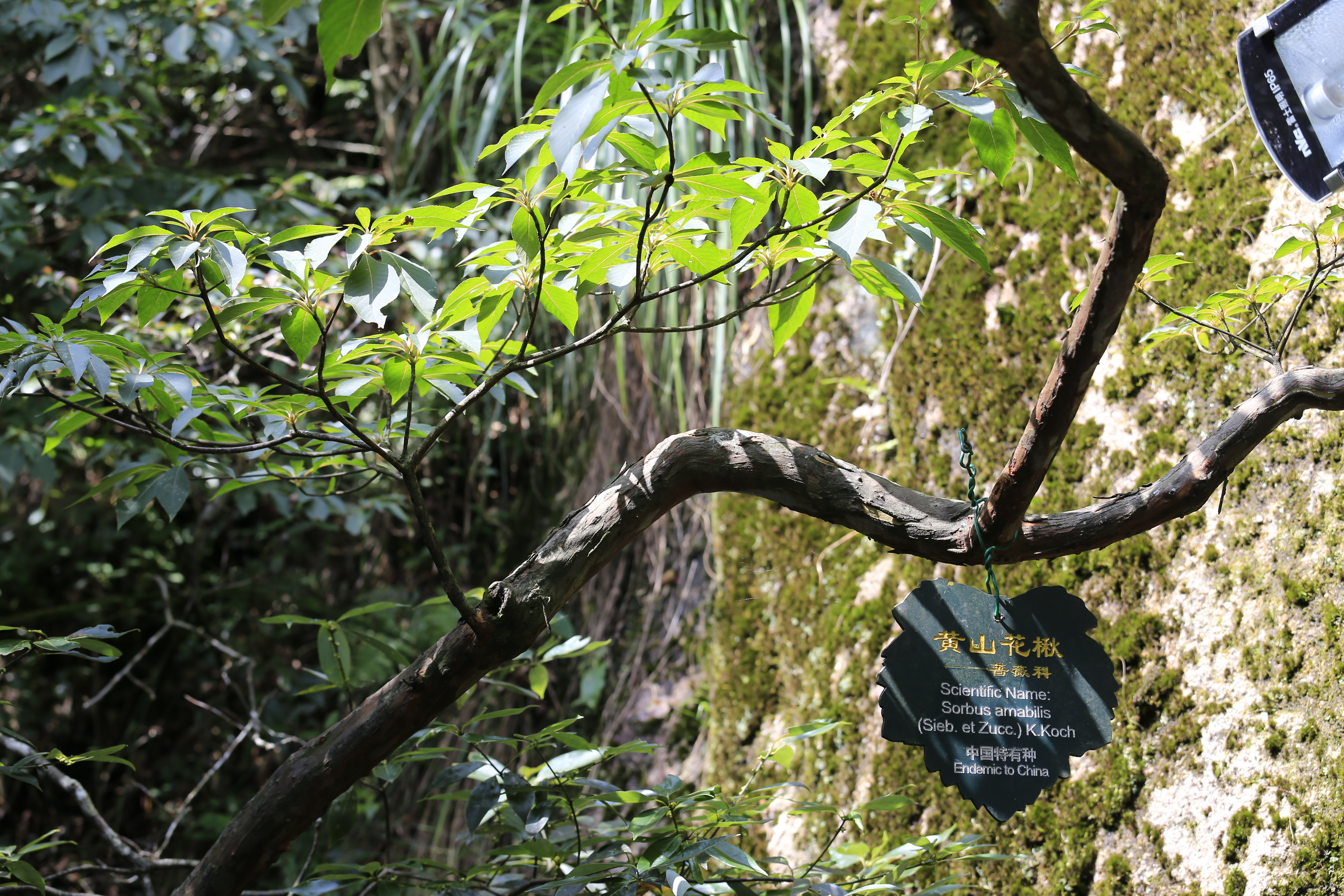
- On Mount Sanqing, China

Scientific classification
- Kingdom: Plantae
- Clade: Tracheophytes
- Clade: Angiosperms
- Clade: Eudicots
- Clade: Rosids
- Order: Rosales
- Family: Rosaceae
- Genus: Sorbus
- Species: S. commixta

Binomial name
- Sorbus commixta Hedl.

Synonyms
- List: Pyrus commixta (Hedl.) Asch. & Graebn.; Pyrus americana var. micrantha K.Koch; Pyrus americana var. micrantha Miq.; Pyrus americana var. rufoferruginea Shirai; Pyrus americana var. rufoferruginea (Shirai ex C.K.Schneid.) Koidz.; Pyrus aucuparia var. japonica Maxim. ex Franch. & Sav.; Pyrus commixta f. angustissima (C.K.Schneid.) Cardot; Pyrus commixta f. microphylla Cardot; Pyrus cunonioides M.F.Fay & Christenh.; Pyrus horti-edeni M.F.Fay & Christenh.; Pyrus micrantha var. macrophylla Cardot; Pyrus reflexipetala (Koehne) M.F.Fay & Christenh.; Pyrus rufoferruginea (Shirai ex C.K.Schneid.) Cardot; Pyrus wilfordii (Koehne) M.F.Fay & Christenh.; Sorbus amabilis Cheng ex T.T.Yu & K.C.Kuan; Sorbus amabilis var. wuyishanensis Z.X.Yu; Sorbus americana var. japonica (Maxim.) Kitam.; Sorbus americana subsp. japonica (Maxim.) Kitam.; Sorbus americana var. rufoferruginea (Shirai ex C.K.Schneid.) Kitam.; Sorbus amurensis var. lanata Nakai; Sorbus amurensis f. latifoliolata (Nakai) W.Lee; Sorbus amurensis var. latifoliolata Nakai; Sorbus amurensis var. rufa Nakai; Sorbus amurensis f. rufa (Nakai) M.Kim; Sorbus aucuparia var. japonica Maxim.; Sorbus chionophylla Nakai; Sorbus commixta f. angustissima C.K.Schneid.; Sorbus commixta var. pilosa Nakai; Sorbus commixta f. pilosa (Nakai) Nakai; Sorbus commixta var. rufoferruginea Shirai ex C.K.Schneid.; Sorbus commixta var. sachalinensis Koidz.; Sorbus commixta var. takasui Kudô; Sorbus commixta var. typica C.K.Schneid.; Sorbus heterodonta Koehne; Sorbus japonica (Maxim.) Koehne; Sorbus japonica var. rufoferruginea (Shirai ex C.K.Schneid.) Koidz.; Sorbus macrophylla (Cardot) Koidz.; Sorbus pohuashanensis f. latifoliolata (Nakai) M.Kim; Sorbus pruinosa Koehne; Sorbus reflexipetala Koehne; Sorbus rufoferruginea (Shirai ex C.K.Schneid.) C.K.Schneid.; Sorbus serotina Koehne; Sorbus wilfordii Koehne; Sorbus yesoensis Nakai

= Sorbus commixta =

Species of tree

Sorbus commixta, the Japanese rowan, is a species of flowering plant in the family Rosaceae, native to central and eastern China, Korea, Japan, and Sakhalin.

== Name ==
The specific epithet commixta means "mixed or mingled together".

== Description ==
It is a small to medium-sized deciduous tree growing to 7–10 m (23–33 ft) tall, rarely 18 m (59 ft), growing in mixed forests and on mountain slopes. It has a rounded crown and brownish to silvery-grey bark. The leaves are 20–30 cm (8–12 in) long, and pinnate. The leaves consist of 11–17 leaflets, each 4–7 cm (2–3 in) long and 1–2.5 cm broad, with an acuminate apex and serrated margins; they change to a deep purple or red in autumn. The flowers are 6–10 mm in diameter, with five white petals and 20 yellowish-white stamens; they are produced in corymbs 9–15 cm (4–6 in) in diameter in late spring to early summer. The fruit is a bright orange to red pome 7–8 mm in diameter, maturing in autumn.

Plants from Hokkaidō, the Kuril Islands and Sakhalin are sometimes distinguished as Sorbus commixta' var. 'sachalinensis, with larger leaflets up to 9 cm long.

== Cultivation and uses ==
Sorbus commixta is grown as an ornamental tree, hardy in zones 5-9. It grows best in moist, well-drained soil, in full sun. A number of cultivars have been selected, the most popular being 'Embley' (with fastigiate branching) and 'Serotina' (flowering later in early summer). 'Embley' has gained the Royal Horticultural Society's Award of Garden Merit.
