= Mashike Station =

Former railway station in Mashike, Hokkaido, Japan

Coordinates: 43°51′23.55″N 141°31′39.35″E

Mashike Station 増毛駅
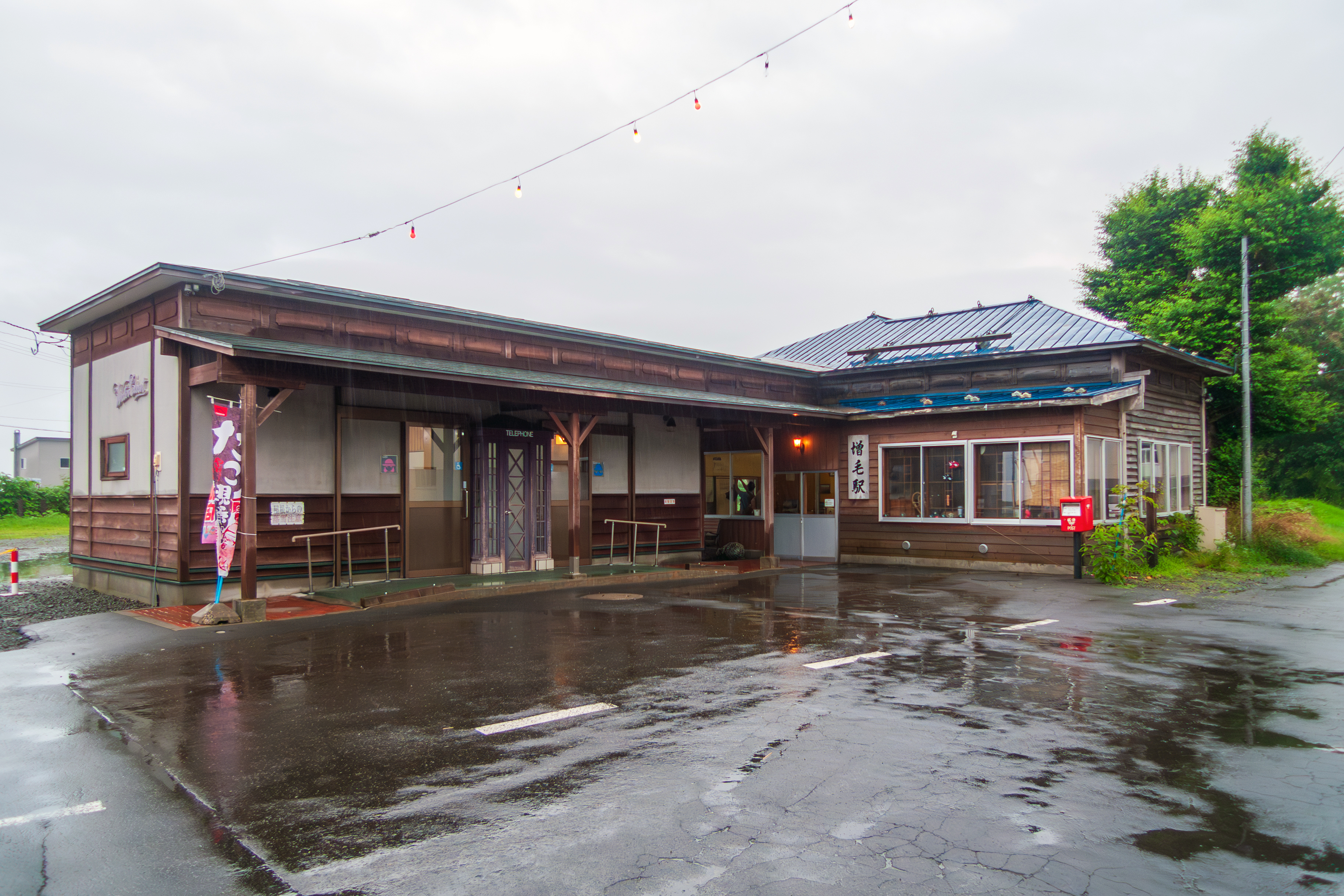
- Station building, July 2015

General information
- Operator: JR Hokkaido
- Line: Rumoi Main Line

History
- Opened: 5 November 1921
- Closed: 4 December 2016
Location

Mashike Station (増毛駅, Mashike-eki) was a railway station on the Rumoi Main Line in Mashike, Hokkaido, Japan, operated by Hokkaido Railway Company (JR Hokkaido). The station closed on 4 December 2016.

== Lines ==
Mashike Station was the terminus of the Rumoi Main Line from Fukagawa. The station was unstaffed.

== Adjacent stations ==
«	Service	»
Rumoi Main Line
Hashibetsu	Local	Terminus

== History ==
The station opened on 5 November 1921.

On 10 August 2015, JR Hokkaido announced its plans to close the 16.7 km section of the line beyond Rumoi to Mashike in 2016. In April 2016, it was officially announced that the section from Rumoi to Mashike would be closing in December 2016, with the last services operating on 4 December.

== See also ==
- List of railway stations in Japan
