= Rumoi Subprefecture =

Rumoi Subprefecture 留萌振興局
- Subprefecture
- Rumoi-shinkōkyoku
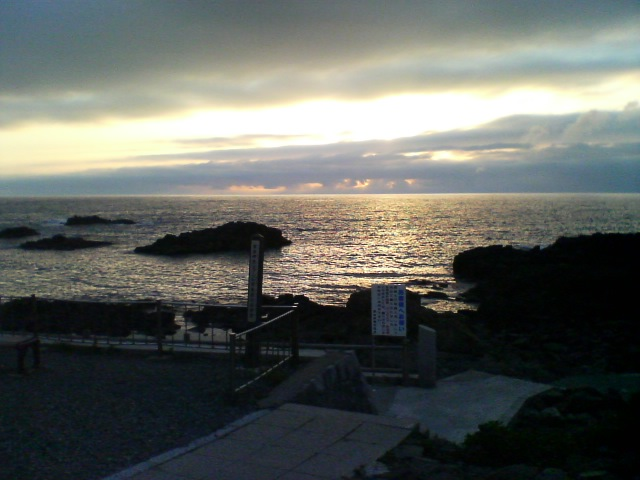
- Sunset from Cape Ōgon, Rumoi City

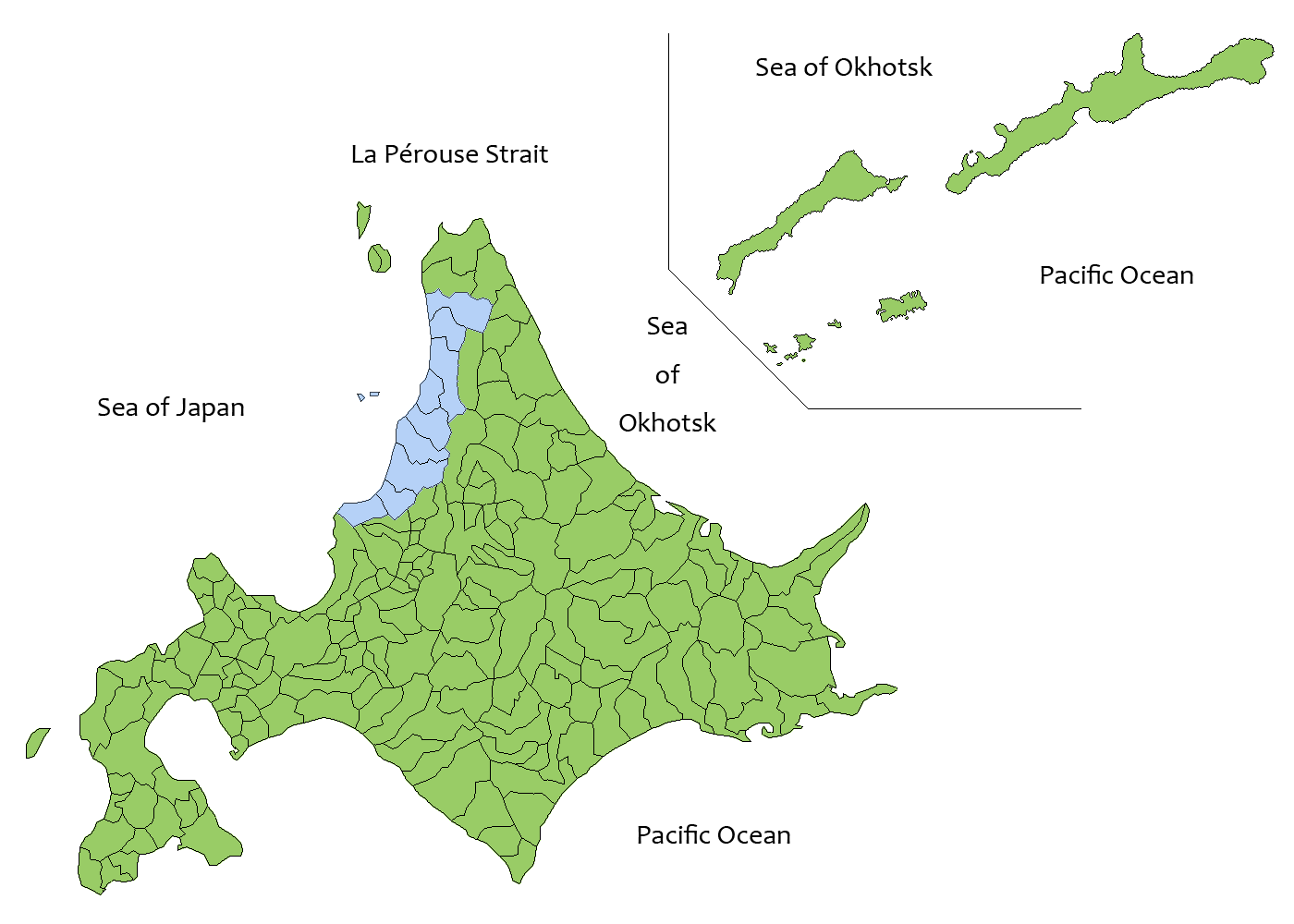
- Rumoi Subprefecture in Hokkaido

- Rumoi Subprefecture in Japan
- Coordinates: 43°56′05″N 141°39′21″E
- Country: Japan
- Prefecture: Hokkaido
- Capital: Rumoi

Area
  - Total: 4,019.91 km^{2} (1,552.10 sq mi)

Population (December 2011)
  - Total: 52,627
  - Density: 13.092/km^{2} (33.907/sq mi)
  - Summer (DST): Japan Standard Time (UTC+9)
- Website: www.rumoi.pref.hokkaido.lg.jp(in Japanese)

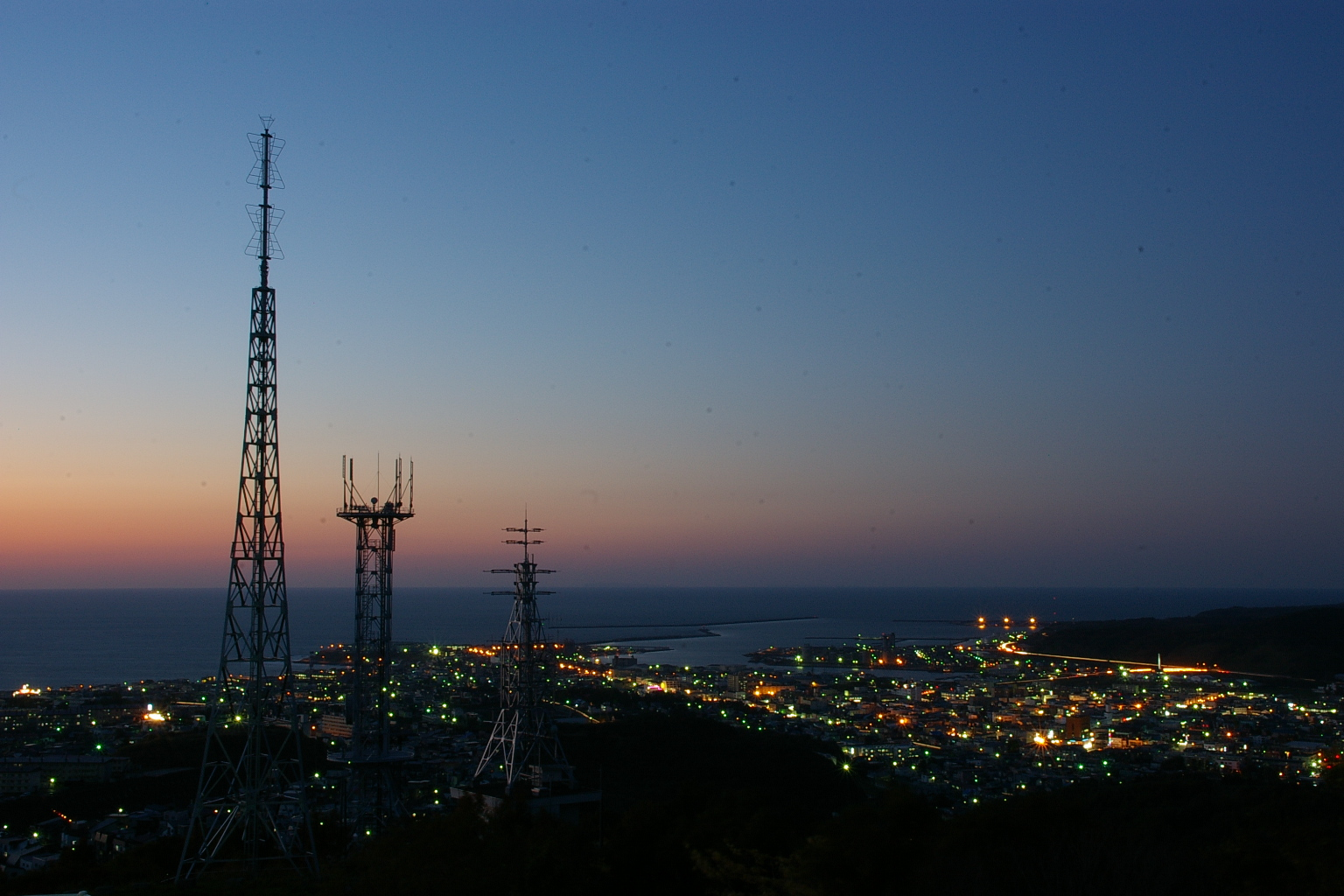
Rumoi City

Rumoi Subprefecture (留萌振興局, Rumoi-shinkō-kyoku) is a subprefecture of Hokkaido Prefecture, Japan. As of 2011, it had a population of 52,627 and an area of 4,019.97 square kilometres (1,552.12 mi^{2}). The population density of the subprefecture, 13 people per km^{2}, is very low compared to the rest of Japan. The population of Rumoi Subprefecture represents 0.96% of the overall population of Hokkaido.

== Geography ==
Rumoi Subprefecture stretches broadly across the coast of the Sea of Japan in northwestern Hokkaido.

=== Municipalities ===
Name		Area (km^{2})	Population	Pop. Density	District	Type	Map
Rōmaji	Kanji	Area (km^{2})	Population	Pop. Density	District	Type	Map
Enbetsu	遠別町	590.86	2,966	5.02	Teshio District	Town	
Haboro	羽幌町	472.49	7,338	15.53	Tomamae District	Town	
Mashike	増毛町	369.64	4,634	12.54	Mashike District	Town	
Obira	小平町	627.29	3,277	5.22	Rumoi District	Town	
Rumoi (capital)	留萌市	297.44	22,242	74.78	no district	City	
Shosanbetsu	初山別村	280.04	1,249	4.46	Tomamae District	Village	
Teshio	天塩町	353.31	3,241	9.17	Teshio District	Town	
Tomamae	苫前町	454.5	3,261	7.17	Tomamae District	Town	

=== Rivers ===
The Rumoi River 44 kilometres (27 mi) flows from Mount Poroshiri in the Hidaka Mountain range to the Sea of Japan.

== History ==
Mashike Subprefecture was established as part of the administrative reforms of Hokkaido during the Meiji period (1868 – 1912). The capital was moved to Rumoi in 1914, and the subprefecture was renamed to Rumoi Subprefecture in the same year. Toyotomi Town in Teshio District transferred to Sōya Subprefecture in 1948, and Horonobe was transferred to Sōya Subprefecture in 2010.

== Economy ==
The fishing industries dominates the economy of the area, and seafood processing remains a thriving industry.

== See also ==
- Sankebetsu brown bear incident
