= Yamamoto Heikichi =

Japanese matagi (1858–1950)

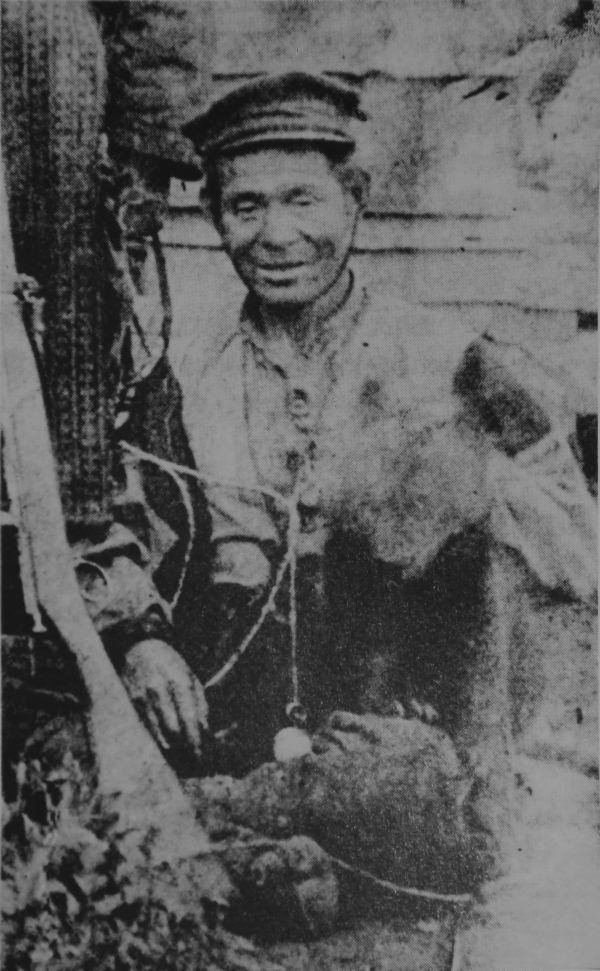
Yamamoto Heikichi around 1913

Yamamoto Heikichi (Japanese: 山本 兵吉; 1858 – July 1950) was a Japanese hunter. He is best known as a local hero for killing Kesagake, the giant brown bear involved in the Sankebetsu brown bear incident. He is reported to have killed over 300 brown bears in his lifetime. A resident of On'ne-no-sawa, Onishika, Rumoi District, Hokkaido (now Onishikatashiro, Obira), his main hunting grounds were the mountains of what was then Teshio Province, such as Mount Onishika.

== Biography ==
Yamamoto Heikichi was reportedly from Shosanbetsu, Tomamae District, Hokkaido. He was alcohol-loving and considered the best shot in the whole Soya Province, a legendary imperial hunter who was called the "sword of Soya" in that neck of the woods.

=== Early life ===
Born at the end of the Edo period, Yamamoto was a hunter in the mountains from a young age. He was nicknamed "Sabasaki's older brother" after stabbing a brown bear to death with a deba bōchō when he was young in Sakhalin. It has also been reported that it was possible for him to kill a Japanese woodpecker and a Japanese squirrel with a single live bullet. When the Russo-Japanese War broke out, he was 46 and joined the army. He later carried around with him the American-designed, Russian-made bolt action rifle Berdan II M1870 on a daily basis and also kept his trademark military cap as the spoils of war.

In the spring of 1915, Yamamoto found a brown bear's hibernation hole entering the national forest in Kotanbetsu, Tomamae. In attempt to drive a stake through the top, he slipped inside and the bear attacked him. He hugged it to his chest and yelled to his comrades at the entrance to shoot, but they ran away, as did the bear. It was reportedly Yamamoto's most disappointing moment.

=== Sankebetsu brown bear incident ===
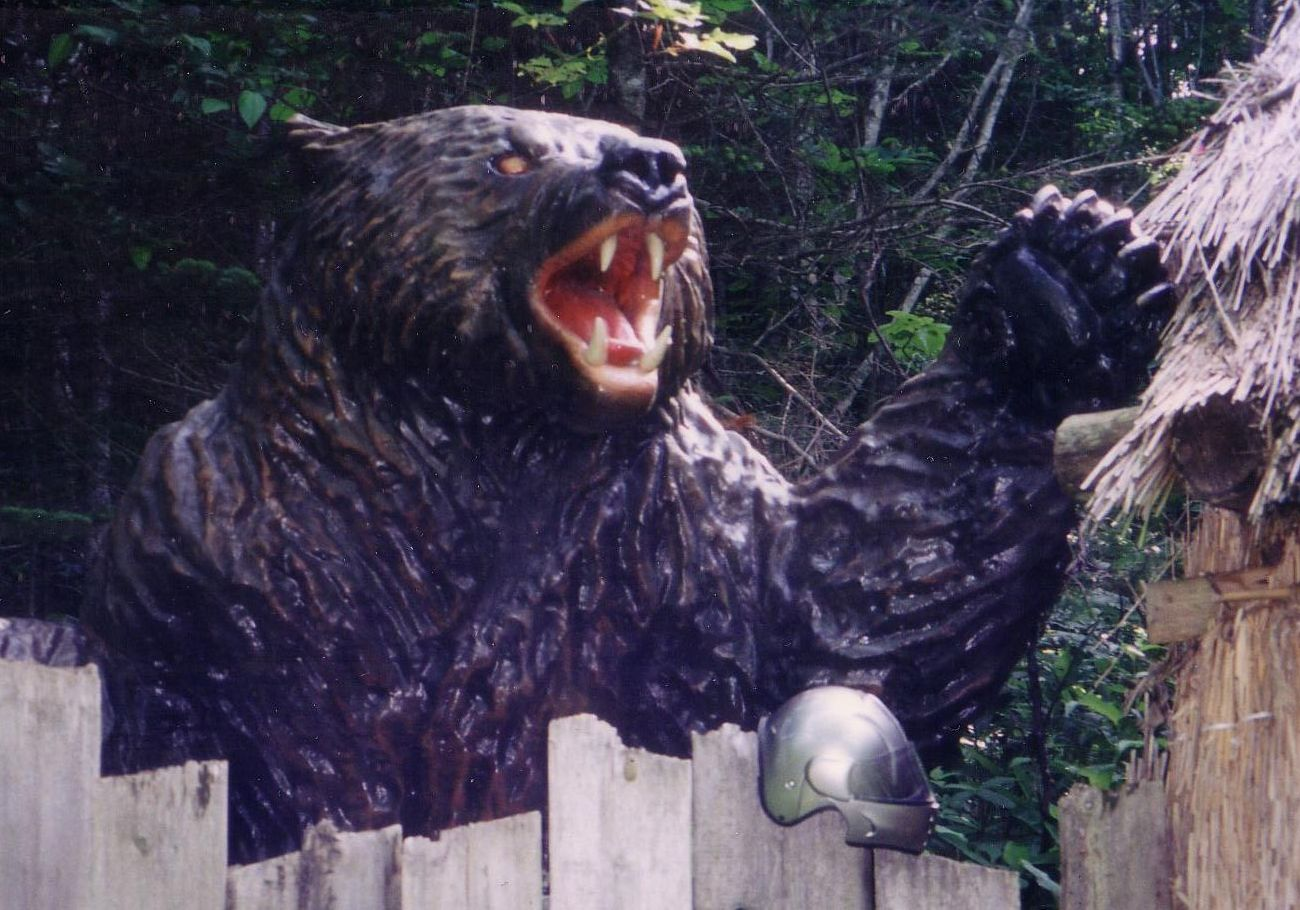
Appearance of Kesagake recreated at the reconstruction site of the incident

On December 9-10, 1915, when Yamamoto was 57 years old, seven settlers were killed by a male brown bear, a man-eater nicknamed Kesagake, in Sankebetsu Rokusen-sawa, Tomamae District (now Sankei). Around this time, Yamamoto had pawned off his gun due to debt when he heard about the incident. According to a resident of Sankei, Yamamoto reluctantly joined the team sent by the Japanese government to hunt down the bear late in the night from December 10-12. At roughly 6 p.m. on December 13, he witnessed a team member named Suzuki and a brown bear breaking into an unoccupied house, but he was unable to shoot them to death.

On the 14th, the team entered the mountains in a large-scale climbing. Yamamoto entered the mountain from a different path than the rest of the team, and around 200 meters in he saw a brown bear resting in a large mizunara tree near the summit. After moving forward about 20 meters, he took shelter in a Japanese elm tree and shot the bear in the chest. However, the bear stood up and glared at him. He fired a second shot, the bullet reportedly hitting the bear's head. At 10 a.m., the brown bear that had killed seven people was killed by Yamamoto. As a reward, he was given a military uniform and a hat without a license tag by the Hokkaido government. However, he never wore them to hunt, usually wearing a tenugui over his cheeks, straw shoes, and a blanket-like cloth over his sashiko. He reportedly went hunting with his effects tied around his body and a gun strapped to his shoulder.

On the night he shot the brown bear, he was drinking alcohol at the Sankebetsu Youth Center and, after the mayor of Sankebetsu, Yosakichi Ōkawa, tried to hand him money collected from the villagers, he was drinking heavily. He got angry and fired his gun into the roof, rejecting the money.

=== Later life ===
After this incident, Yamamoto built a house in Sankebetsu and moved there with his family from Onishika, the village where he had been living. However, because the villagers called him a "bear-killing hero", he often drank alcohol and fought with the villagers. He would drink and beat his wife, so it was common for her to return to Onishika with their children. However, he was kind to children and often reportedly taught Haruyoshi Ōkawa, the son of the district chief who later become a matagi, how to shoot bears.

He would live in Sankebetsu for the next two to three years. In novels and movies, he is often portrayed as a very unruly person, but according to his grandson, Akimitsu Yamamoto, who works at the Toyosaki Post Office in Shosanbetsu, he sometimes got rough when he drank alcohol, but was always kind and caring. In July 1950, he died at the age of 92 in his hometown of Shosanbetsu.

== Portrayals ==
Yamamoto was featured prominently in Akira Yoshimura's novel Brown Bear Storm (羆嵐, Higuma Arashi), based on the Sankebetsu brown bear incident, as the character Ginshirō Yamaoka. In 1980, the novel was adapted into both a TBS Radio drama special, with Ken Takakura portraying the character, and a Yomiuri TV Thursday golden drama Fear! Panic!! Man-Eating Bear: The Greatest Tragedy in History - Brown Bear Storm (恐怖！パニック!! 人喰熊 史上最大の惨劇 羆嵐), with the character portrayed by Rentarō Mikuni.

== Bibliography ==
- Kimura, Moritake (1994). 慟哭の谷 [Valley of Lamentation] (in Japanese). Kyōdō Bunka. ISBN 978-4-905664-89-5.
