= Haruyoshi Ōkawa =

Japanese matagi (1909–1985)

Haruyoshi Ōkawa (Japanese: 大川 春義, Hepburn: Ōkawa Haruyoshi; 1909 – December 9, 1985) was a Japanese hunter. Born in Sankebetsu, Tomamae, Hokkaido, he was one of the few witnesses of the Sankebetsu brown bear incident. Vowing to avenge the victims of the incident, he would go on to kill over 100 brown bears in his lifetime, helping prevent the damage of brown bears in Hokkaido.

== Early life ==
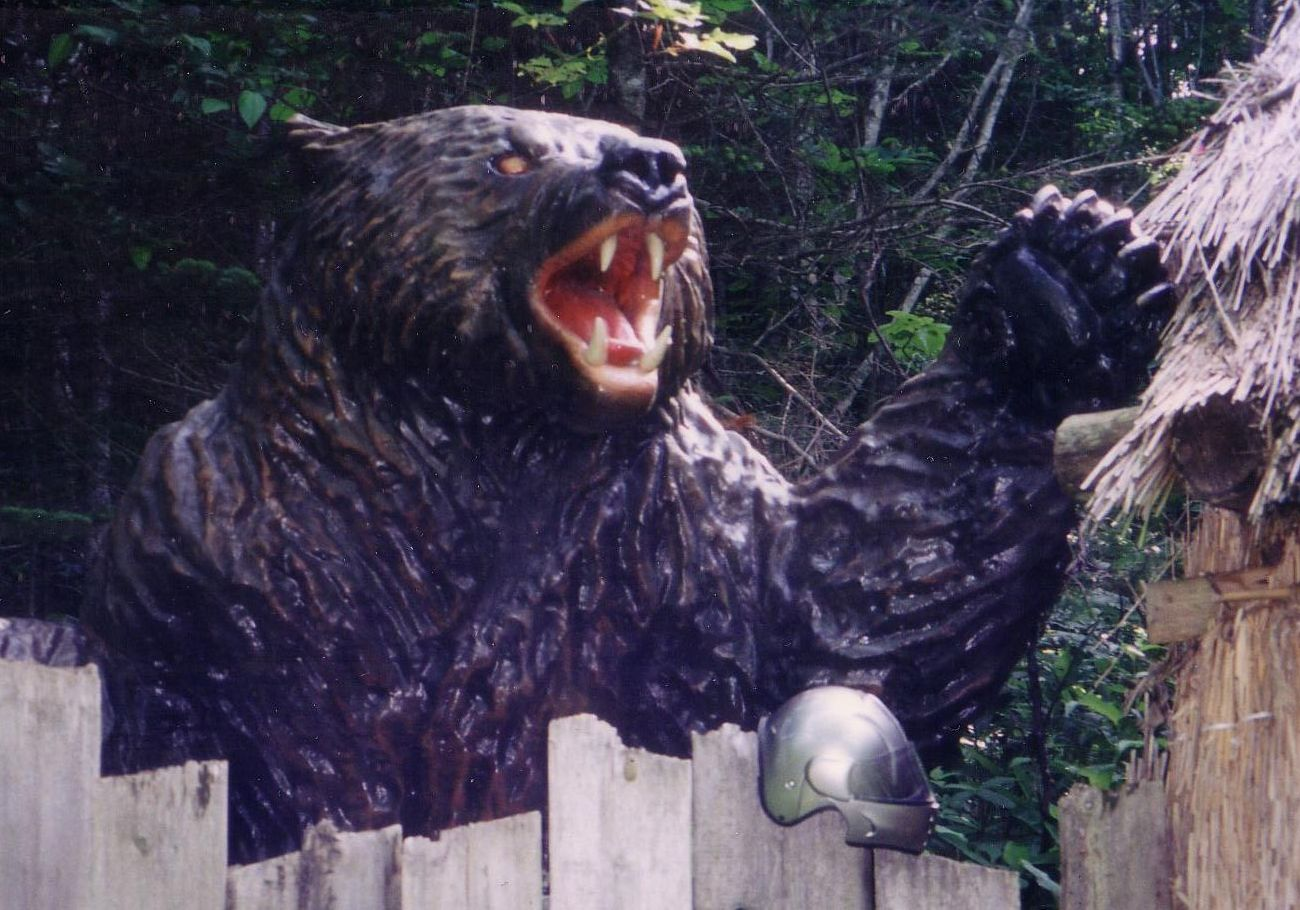
Appearance of Kesagake recreated at the reconstruction site of the incident

Haruyoshi Ōkawa was born in 1909 (Note: March 1910 has also been given as a birthdate.) as the son (Note: Either his oldest son or his third son.) of Yosakichi Ōkawa, the mayor and tondenhei of Sankebetsu Ward, Tomamae. The Sankebetsu brown bear incident was an incident in December 1915, in which seven residents of Sankebetsu died due to an attack by a male Ezo brown bear. (Note: Seven victims, including an unborn child, died at the time of the incident. Including the victim that died two year later from injuries sustained in the incident, there were eight casualties.) His home served as the emergency headquarters during the incident, so he saw and heard everything about the incident.

After the incident, his father encouraged him to become a hunter and hunt down brown bears. As a child, he strongly hated brown bears and, in the fall of 1936, in front of the memorial tablets for the seven victims, vowed to avenge them by killing ten brown bears for each victim, for a total of 70.

At the time, Ainu hunters often stopped by the Ōkawa family home to shop after hunting in the mountains. From them, he learned about brown bear ecology and hunting knowledge. He also studied under Heikichi Yamamoto, the matagi who killed Kesagake, the brown bear in the Sankebetsu brown bear incident.

== Career ==
After he reached the conscription age of 20 and was allowed to own a hunting rifle, his father bought him a state-of-the-art Murata rifle with his savings. He went into the mountains with the aim of hunting brown bears but was so frightened by the bears he witnessed that he was unable to shoot them. This continued for over a decade.

In 1941, at the age of 32, he killed his first brown bear and cub, receiving applause from his father and other local residents. This gave him a little confidence, and he killed four bears the following year and three in 1943. The brown bear's gallbladder and fur could be sold for high prices, but Ōkawa, whose sole purpose was revenge, distributed them free of charge to residents.

In 1944, during World War II, he was drafted. He was active on the battlefield with his outstanding marksmanship, honed by hunting brown bears. He could repeatedly hit targets 100 meters away.

Ōkawa was demobilized in 1946 and, to repay his father, who had died, renewed his vow to kill 70 brown bears and resumed hunting the following year. He sometimes worked with other hunters to kill brown bears, but most of the time he hunted alone. Thanks to his experience on the battlefield, he was able to kill one to four bears every year, sometimes up to seven, and achieved fifty in 1969. At that point, he was recognized as the expert who had killed the most brown bears in Hokkaido. Around this time, he purchased a five-shot rifle at the recommendation of the people around him. With the help of his new gun, he achieved his goal of 70 bears, which was celebrated locally. He also received a letter of appreciation from the Japan Hunting Friends Association for his contributions to pest control.

However, damage caused by brown bears continued to occur in Hokkaido. At the request of those around him, he set a new goal of 100 bears. Ōkawa was already over 60 years old and was becoming increasingly fatigued from going to the mountains and beginning to feel strain from the weight of his gun. On May 3, 1977, he achieved 100 bear kills. Of these, 76 were killed by him alone. (Note: On his last day, he killed three bears, making the total amount of bears he killed in his lifetime 102.)

== Retirement, death, and legacy ==
After killing 100 bears, Ōkawa retired from hunting. He then planned to erect a memorial monument for the victims of the Sankebetsu brown bear incident. With the cooperation of local residents who shared the same sentiments, a "Bear Storm Memorial Monument" was erected at the local Sankei shrine on July 5, 1977. On the monument, there is a large inscription that says "Donor Haruyoshi Ōkawa" (施主大川春義, Seshu Ōkawa Haruyoshi).

On December 9, 1985, a memorial service was held to mark the 70th anniversary of the beginning of the Sankebetsu brown bear incident. Ōkawa stood on the podium to give a speech at the municipal Sankei Elementary School (then closed) and, just as he began to speak, collapsed: he died later that day. He did not drink or smoke and had consumed three cups of Sanpei soup in the morning. After Ōkawa hunted down brown bears in revenge for the incident, he suddenly died on its 70th anniversary, leading the people around him to feel a connection. He was buried in the Sankei shrine.

In 1986, Akira Yoshimura published the short story "Putting Down the Gun" (銃を置く, Jū wo Oku) in the 500th special issue of Shōsetsu Shinchō. It is based on Ōkawa and serves as the sequel to the novel Bear Storm (羆嵐, Kuma Arashi), which was based on the Sankebetsu brown bear incident. "Putting Down the Gun" was selected as a "Treasure of Tomamae Town" alongside the taxidermy of Japan's largest male brown bear, Hokkaitaro, who was killed by Ōkawa's eldest son Takayoshi Ōkawa (died in June 1998) and others on May 6, 1980.

The damaged caused by brown bears to Hokkaido amounted to 46 deaths, 101 injuries, and 2,600 cattle and horse deaths from 1904 to Sankebetsu brown bear incident. However, in the 20 years since Ōkawa had become a hunter, the damage had been reduced to one third of that amount. For this reason, his achievements are highly regarded.

== Hunting style ==
His method of hunting was ascetic and strict. The only food he brought with him were umeboshi rice balls and water. To hide his presence from bears, when he walked in the snow, he stepped in time to the sound of snow falling on bamboo grass. He also refrained from smoking so his odor would not be detected.

While he killed many brown bears, he also worshipped them as the gods of the mountains. He would always create a bear shrine to commemorate the brown bears he killed. He habitually said, "Once you're in the mountains, don't say anything bad about bears" (山に入ったら、クマの悪口は一切言ってはならない). In his later years, he hesitated to kill mother bears that were protecting their cubs.

He continued to hunt brown bears with the thought of avenging the victims of the Sankebetsu brown bear incident, but after killing 100 bears, he began to think it was not the bears at fault but the humans who destroyed the bears' habitat.

== Bibliography ==
- Honda, Katsuichi (1983). 貧困なる精神 悪口雑言罵詈讒謗集 [The Spirit of Poverty: A Collection of Slander, Foul Language, Abusive Language, and Defamation] (in Japanese). Vol. 15. Suzusawa Shoten. ISBN 978-4-7954-0015-3.
- Ichidō, Gōda (March 20, 2003). 人間登場 北の歴史を彩る [Appearance of Humans: Coloring the History of the North]. NHK Hokkaido 212 (in Japanese). Vol. 1. Hokkaido Publication Project Center. ISBN 978-4-8328-0303-9.
- Kimura, Moritake (2015). 慟哭の谷 北海道三毛別・史上最悪のヒグマ襲撃事件 [Valley of Lamentation: The Worst Brown Bear Attack in History in Sankebetsu, Hokkaido]. Bunshun Bunko. Bungeishunjū. ISBN 978-4-16-790534-7.
- STV Radio, ed. (February 16, 2008). ほっかいどう百年物語 北海道の歴史を刻んだ人々──。 [Hokkaido 100 Years Story: People Who Carved Hokkaido's History] (in Japanese). Vol. 8. Nakanishi Publishing. ISBN 978-4-89115-171-3.
- Yomiuri Shimbun Hokkaido Branch Editorial Department, ed. (January 9, 2019). ほっかいどう先人探訪 北の歴史を彩った53人 [Visiting Hokkaido Ancestors: 53 People Who Colored the History of the North] (in Japanese). Kashiwasha. ISBN 978-4-434-25449-9.
