= Bear cache =

Place for storing food outdoors

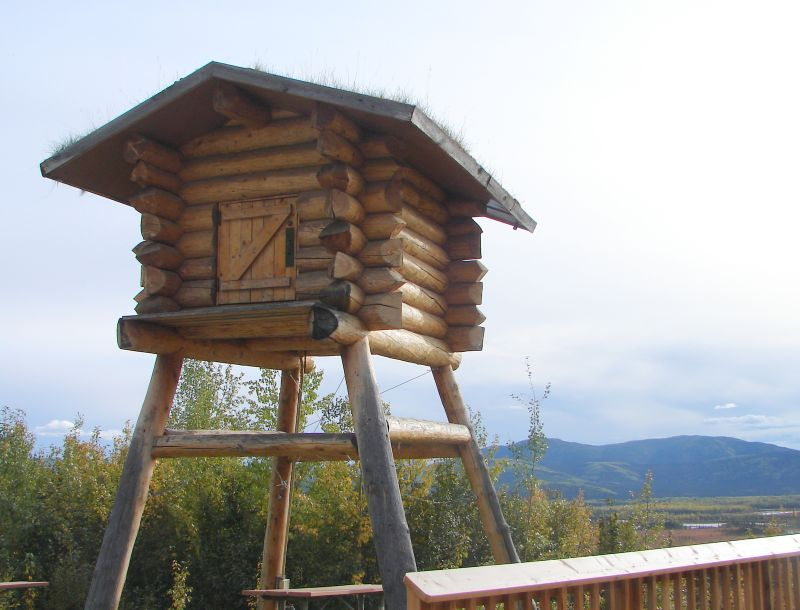
A permanent bear cache in Alaska

A bear cache, food cache or bear box is a place designed to store food outdoors and prevent bears and other animals from accessing it. They are used by campers when staying in bear habitat. They can also be used by hunters for storing game. A bear cache is often a structure that is more permanent, not to be confused with a bear canister.

== Designs ==
A makeshift cache can be made by hanging the food from a tree branch using rope, called a bear bag. The cache should be 100 metres/300 feet from the campsite and downwind if possible. To be effective, the food must be distanced from the branch, the trunk, and the ground. When a suitable tree is not available, hanging the food over a cliff is a possible alternative.

In areas popular with both people and bears, permanent caches are often built. These include poles for hanging, steel cabinets, and raised structures with removable ladders.

A bear cache built upon upright tree trunks may be the model of the legendary Baba Yaga's hut.

== Gallery ==
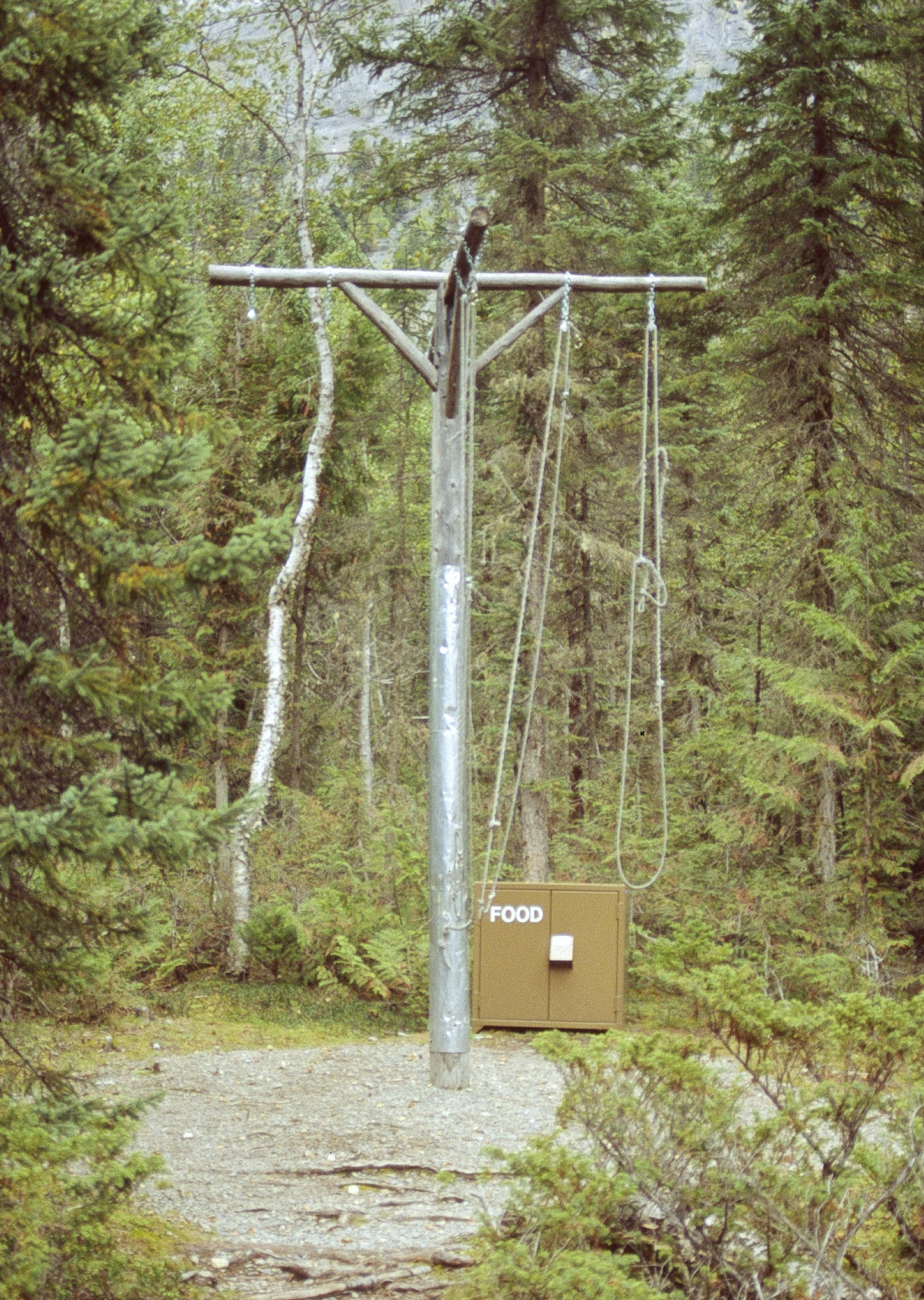
A metal pole with pulleys and rope

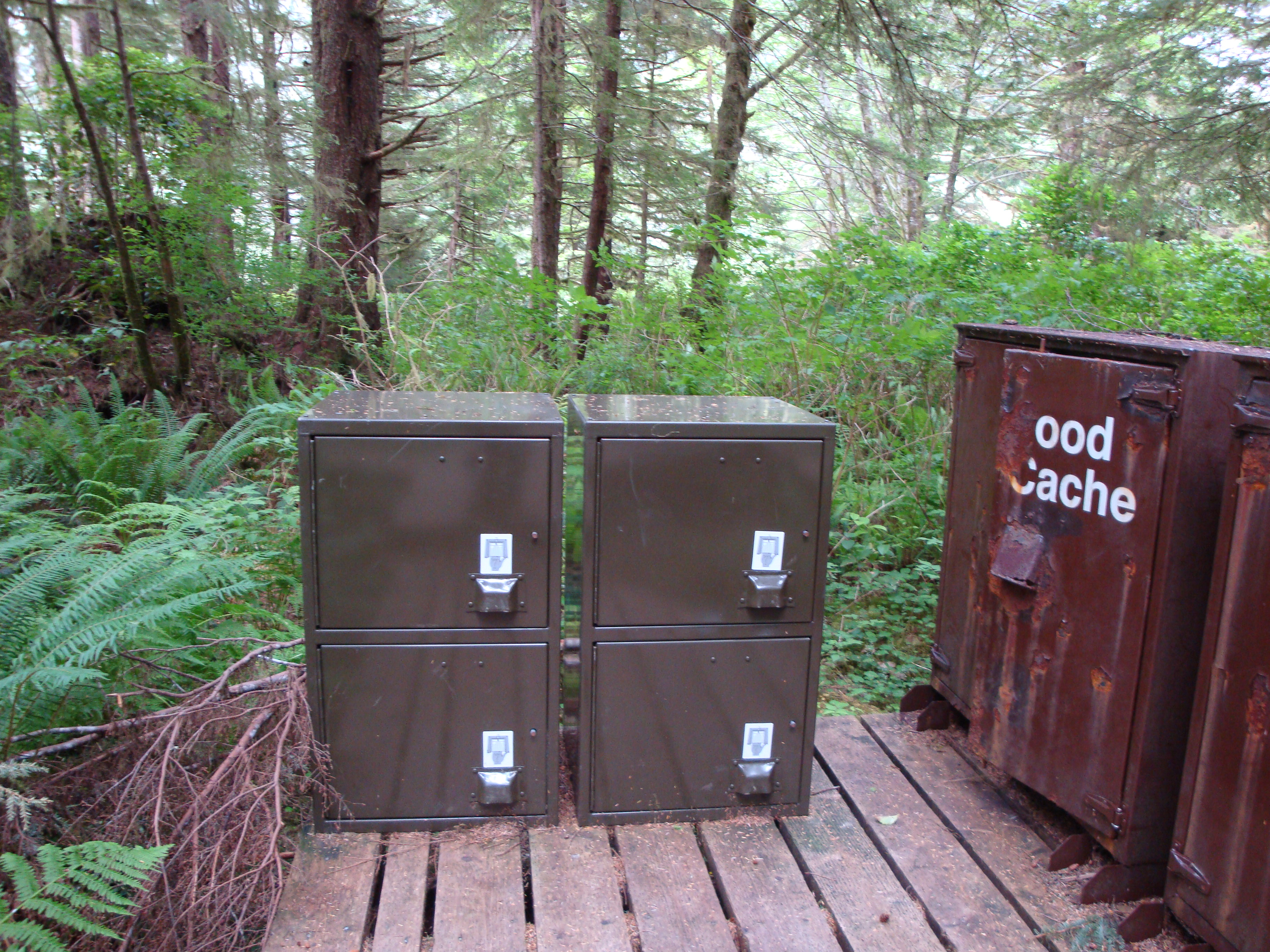
Metal boxes with bear-proof latches

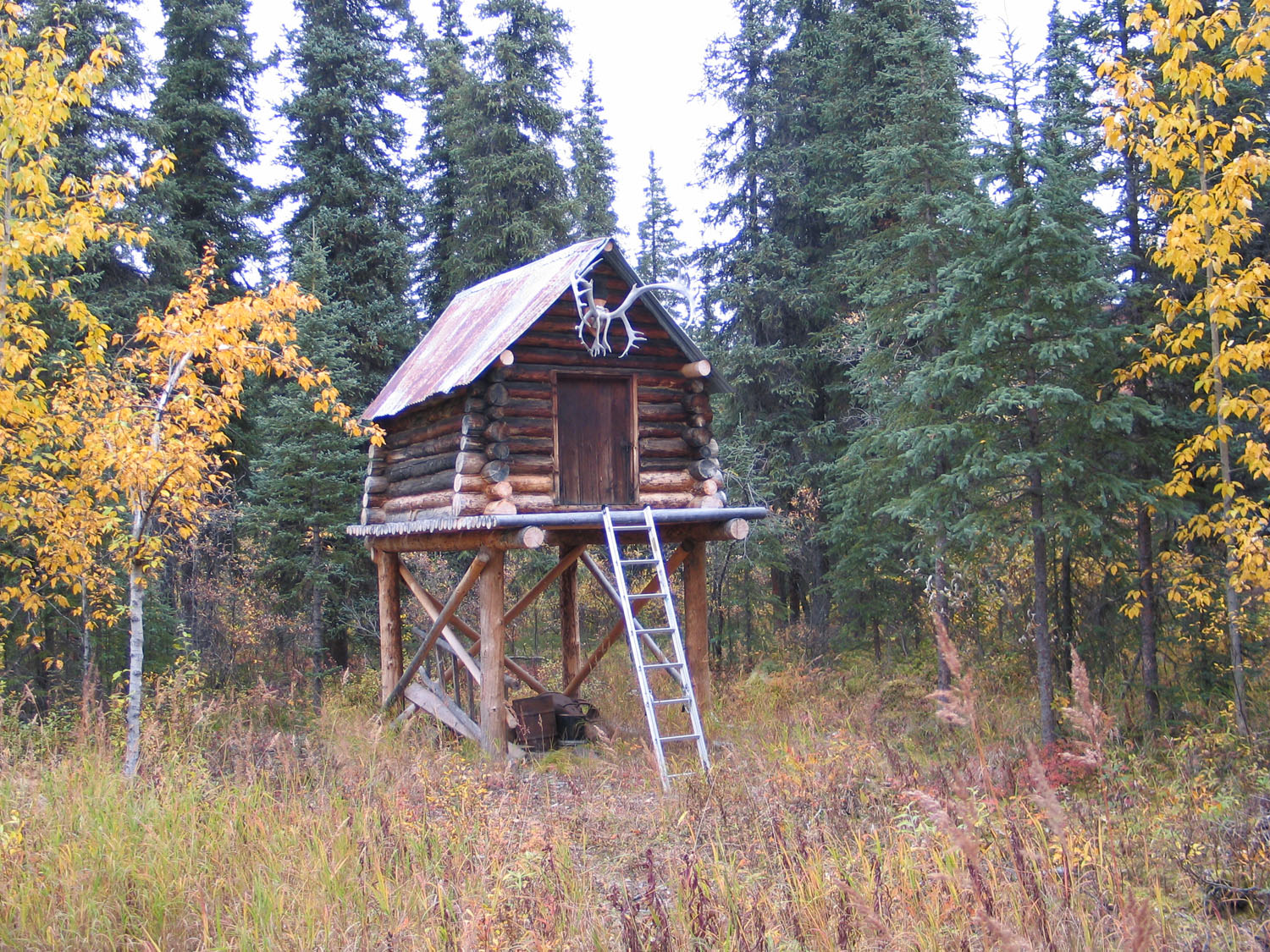
A wooden structure with a ladder

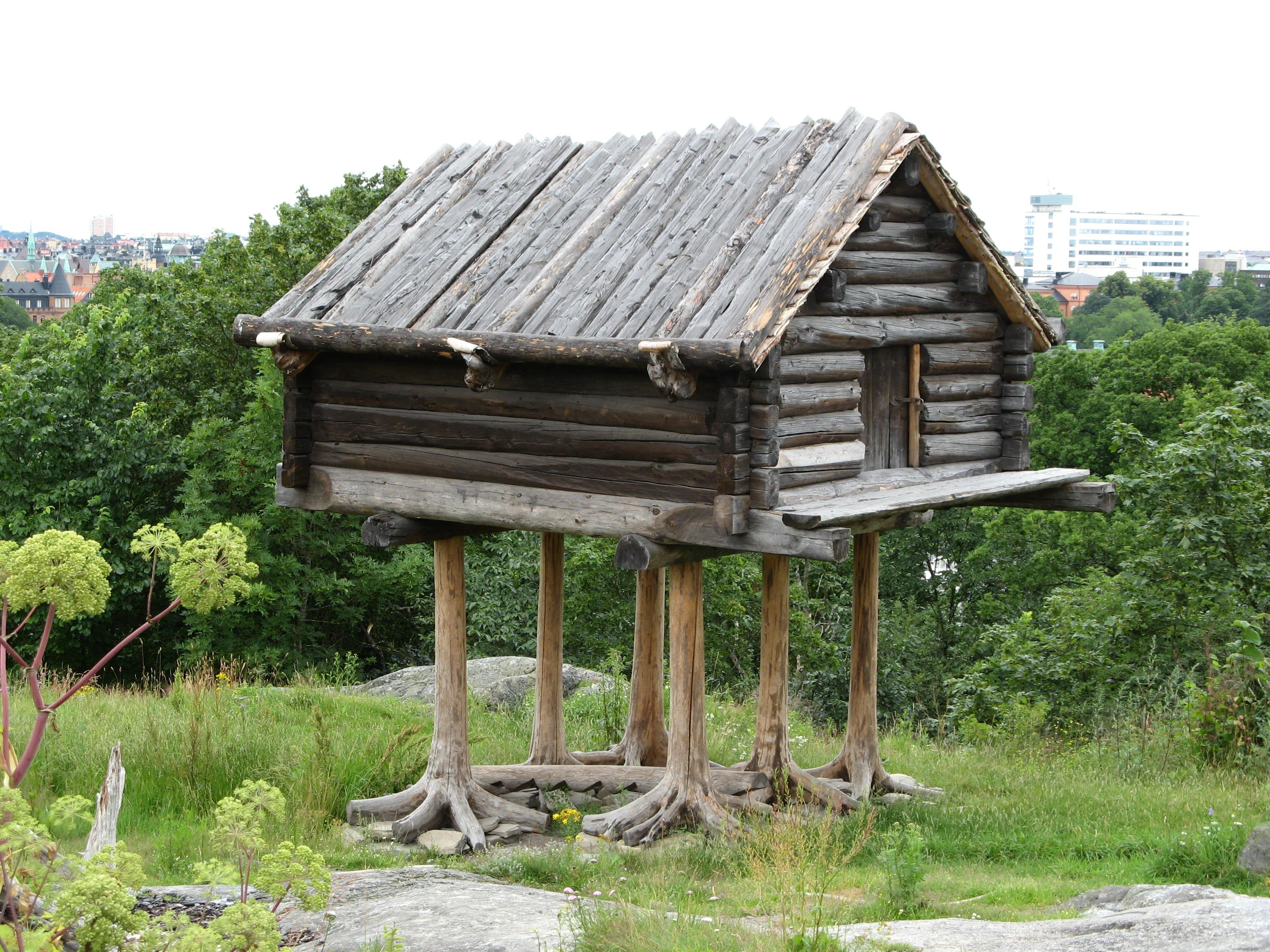
Traditional Sami bear cache, ájtte.

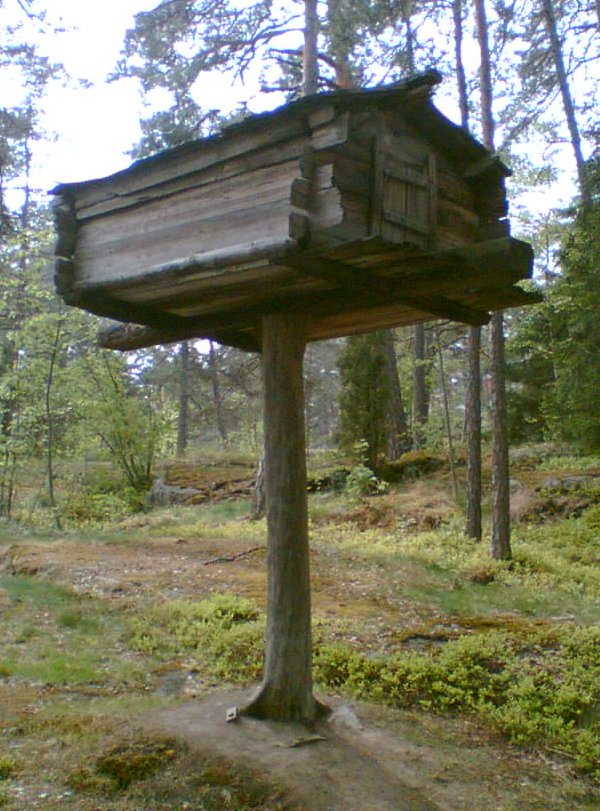
Traditional Finnish bear cache, patsasaitta.

== See also ==
- Bear attack
- Bear danger
- Bear-resistant food storage container
- Backpacking with animals
