= Sloth bear of Mysore =

Deadly bear killed in 1957

The Sloth bear of Mysore was an unusually aggressive Indian sloth bear responsible for the deaths of at least 12 people and the mauling of two dozen others in 1957. It was killed by Kenneth Anderson, who described it in his memoirs Man-Eaters and Jungle Killers:

[Sloth] Bears, as a rule, are excitable but generally harmless creatures. This particular bear carried the mark of Cain, in that he had become the wanton and deliberate murderer of several men, whom he had done to death in most terrible fashion, without provocation.

— "The Black Bear of Mysore", from Man-Eaters and Jungle Killers, Kenneth Anderson, Allen & Unwin, 1957

The reasons given to explain the Mysore sloth bear's unusual behaviour varied. Some of the natives within the bear's killing range thought that the bear was a sow taking revenge on humanity after her cubs were stolen. Others thought that it was a male which had previously abducted a young girl as its mate, only to have her rescued by the villagers, thus inciting the bear's anger. Kenneth Anderson believed that the bear had previously been injured by humans and altered its behaviour accordingly.

== First attacks ==
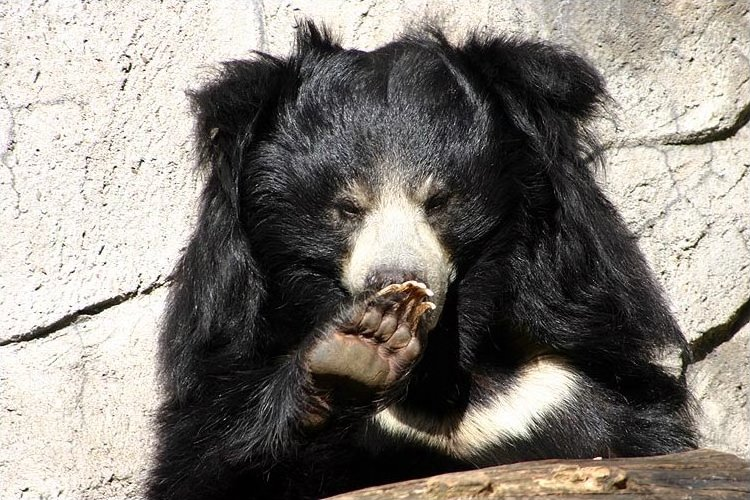
A sloth bear in the Frankfurt Zoo showing its claws

The bear began its attacks in the Nagvara Hills, east to the town of Arsikere, 167 kilometres north-west of Bangalore in Mysore State. It made its home in the numerous boulder strewn hillocks, from whence it would come down to forage in the fields. As its boldness increased, it began harassing people in both daylight and night-time hours.

In typical sloth bear fashion, the animal attacked its victims' faces with its claws and teeth. Those who survived its attacks usually lost one or both eyes, some their noses while others had their cheeks bitten through. Those who died often had their faces completely torn from their heads. At least three of the victims had been partially eaten.

== First hunt for the bear ==
The bear's attacks first came to the attention of Kenneth Anderson when a friend of his named Alam Bux sent him a postcard, urgently asking him to come to his home, a shrine situated between Arsikere and Shimoga. Bux's 22-year-old son had been fatally mauled by the bear at 9:00 p.m., having unintentionally disturbed it while it was feeding on fallen figs.

Anticipating an easy hunt, Anderson did not come prepared for a long trip, having brought with him for the hunt just an electric torch, a .405 Winchester rifle, and a single change of clothes. Arriving at the shrine early in the evening, Anderson planned to wait until darkness to shoot the bear. Starting his search near fig trees, Anderson walked for 2.5 kilometres without spotting the bear. He then unsuccessfully searched groundnut fields before finally returning to the shrine. Anderson made two subsequent tours during the course of the night, both of which proved unsuccessful. At noon the next day, Anderson was taken to the mouth of what was thought to be the bear's cave. After throwing stones into the crevice with no results, Anderson returned to Bangalore, asking Bux to inform him by telegram should the bear attack again.

== Second hunt for the bear ==
One month later, two woodcutters in Sakrepatna, a small town between Chikmagalur and Kadur, were seriously mauled by the bear, one fatally. Anderson was contacted by the District Forest Officer of Chikmagalur who requested that Anderson come and shoot the bear. Anderson requested precise coordinates for the bear's whereabouts, and was answered ten days later that the bear lived in a hillock 4.8 kilometres from the town, near a footpath leading to a lake called the Ionkere. It was also revealed that the bear had since mauled the Forest Guard during a regular patrol. Anderson left for Chikmagalur and set up his headquarters in a small house owned by the Mysore Forest Department. At 4:30 the next afternoon, a man rushed to the bungalow, stating that the bear had mauled his brother, a cattle grazer near the hill where the bear allegedly had his lair.

Setting forth with a rifle, a torch and three or four helpers, Anderson journeyed 9.6 kilometres into the jungle for an hour and a half before coming across a heavily scrubbed hill. The helpers refused to accompany him any further, and Anderson followed the general directions given by the victim's brother of the attack's location. After searching for a while through the thick brush, Anderson heard the faint moans of the victim, whom he found lying at the foot of a tree, unconscious and severely mutilated. Realising that the man was dying, Anderson carried him for a short distance, before spraining his ankle and collapsing. The victim died at 5 in the morning, and Anderson was found later by Forest officials and a dozen villagers. He was hospitalised at Chikmagalur for a week before resuming the hunt.

== Third hunt for the bear ==
During Anderson's absence, the bear had mauled two men along the path of Ionkere Lake. Anderson arrived at Sakrepatna where he was told that the bear had taken to visiting some fields bordered by boram trees 1.6 kilometres from the village. Anderson arrived at the site at 5:00 pm and spent the night at the foot of the largest tree, hoping that the bear would come. At roughly 11:00 pm, Anderson heard the bear digging for roots in the distance, and an hour later, it approached the boram tree. Anderson shone his torch at the bear, which reared up on its hind legs in alarm. Anderson then shot it in the chest.

== See also ==
- Sankebetsu brown bear incident
- Bear attack
- Bear danger
- List of individual bears
