= Sankebetsu brown bear incident =

Fatal series of bear attacks in Hokkaido, Japan, 1915

Coordinates: 44°08′01″N 141°47′52″E

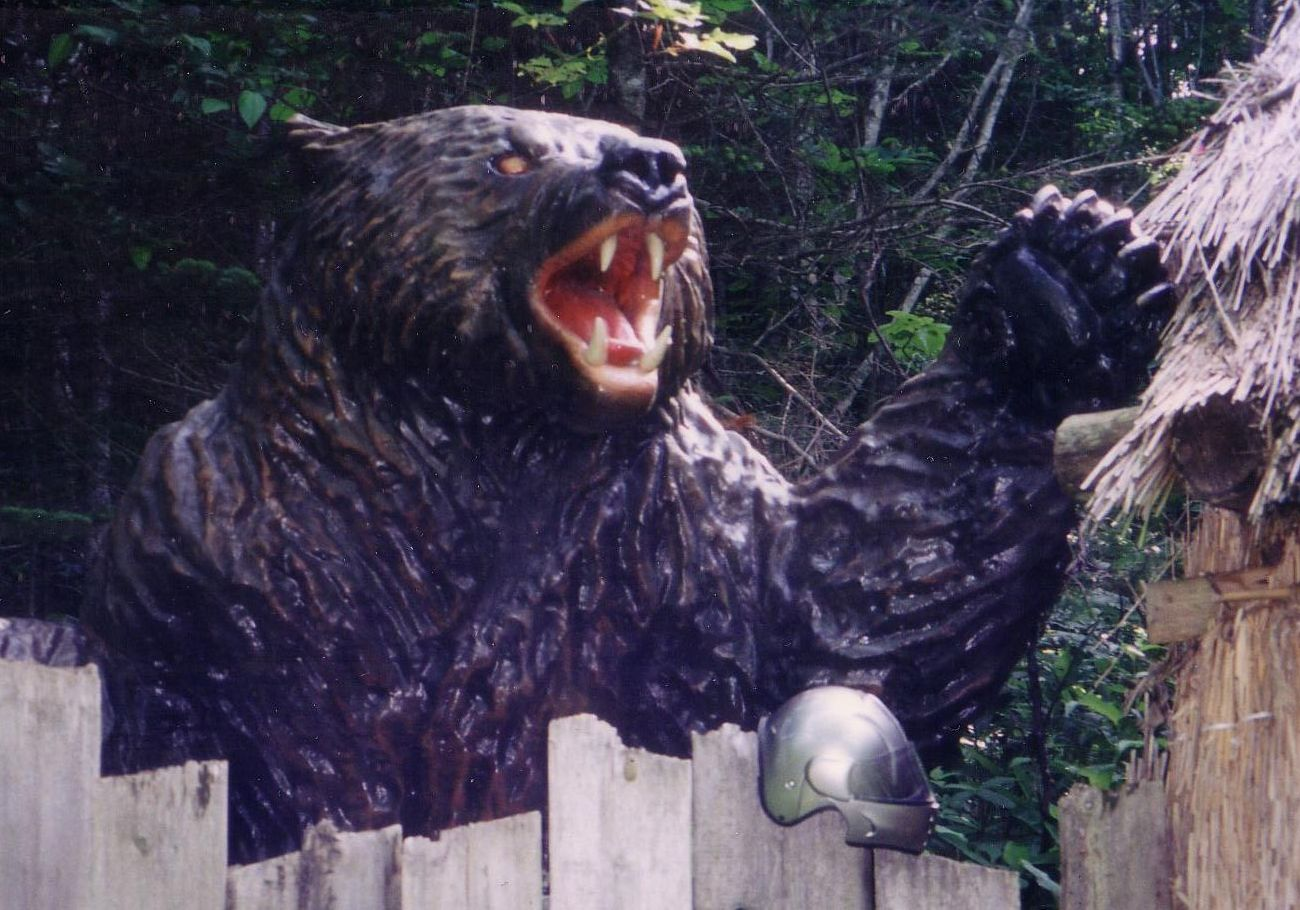
- A statue of the bear involved in the incident
- Location: Hokkaido, Japan
- Date: December 9, 1915 – December 15, 1915
- Attack type: Bear attack
- Deaths: 7
- Injuries: 3
- Perpetrator: Ezo brown bear

The Sankebetsu brown bear incident (三毛別羆事件, Sankebetsu higuma jiken), also known as the Rokusensawa bear attack (六線沢熊害事件, Rokusensawa yūgai jiken) or the Tomamae brown bear incident (苫前羆事件, Tomamae higuma jiken), was a series of bear attacks which took place between December 9th and 15th, 1915, at the beginning of the Taishō era, in a remote area of Hokkaido, Japan. Over the course of six days, a male Ezo brown bear attacked a number of households, killing seven people and injuring a further three. The incident has been referred to as "the worst animal attack in Japanese history". The attacks ended when the bear was shot dead.

== Background ==
At dawn in mid-November 1915, an Ezo brown bear appeared at the Ikeda family's house in Sankebetsu Rokusen-sawa, a small pioneer village in Teshio Province, about 11 kilometres (6.8 mi) inland from the west coast of Hokkaido. The family horse was loudly spooked by the surprise encounter, but the bear fled after taking only harvested corn. At the time, Sankebetsu was newly settled, so encroachment by wild animals was common.

On November 20, 1915, the bear reappeared. Worrying about the safety of the horse, the head of the Ikeda family called on his second son, Kametarō, and two matagi from his own village and a neighboring village.

When the bear reappeared on November 30, they shot at it but failed to kill it. The next morning, they followed the bear's footprints, which led toward Mount Onishika. Along the trail the hunting party discovered bloodstains, but a snowstorm forced them to turn back. The bloodstains led the party to conclude that the bear, now injured, would no longer raid settlements.

== December attacks ==
=== December 9: Ōta family ===
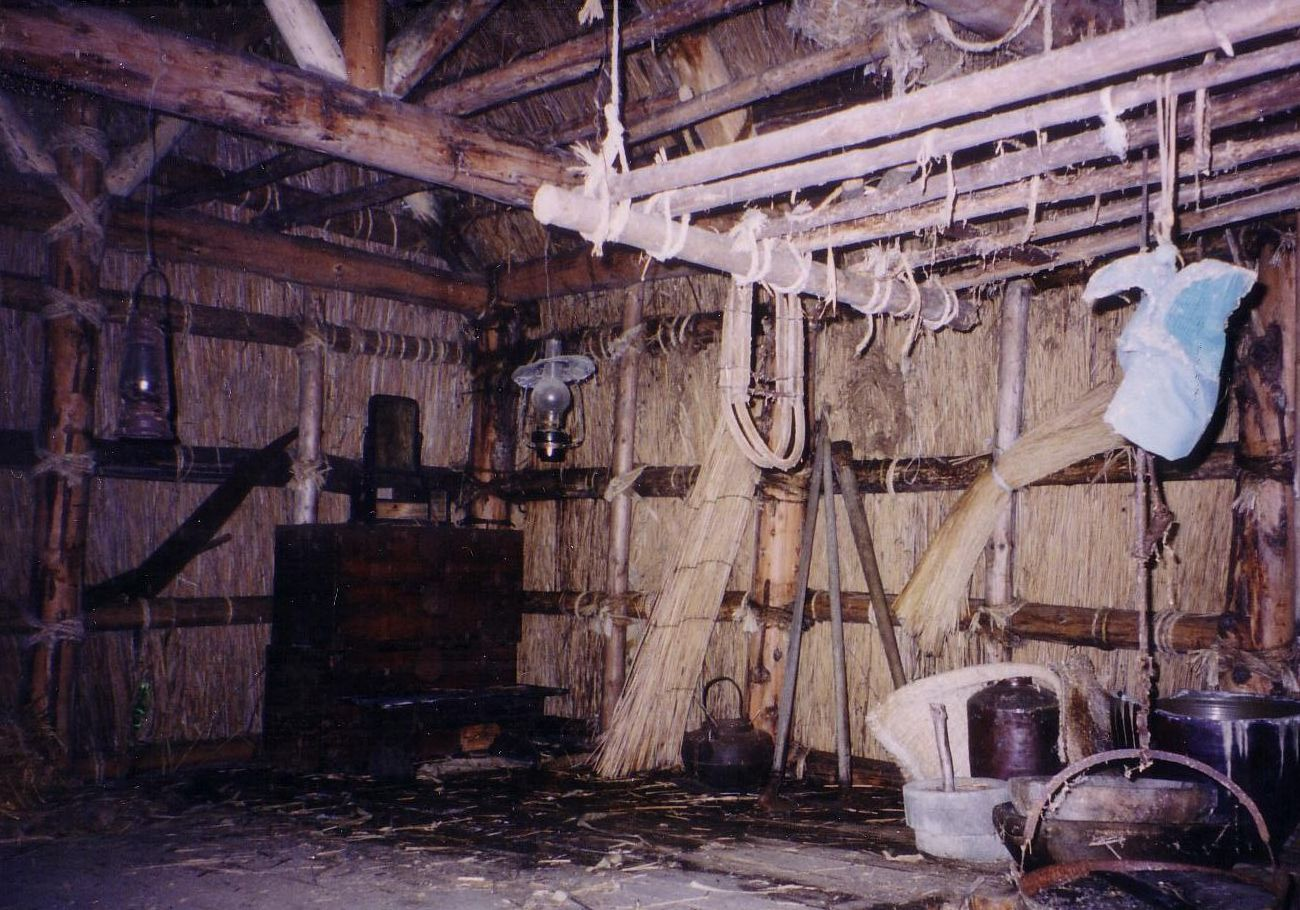
A reproduction of the Ōta family's house

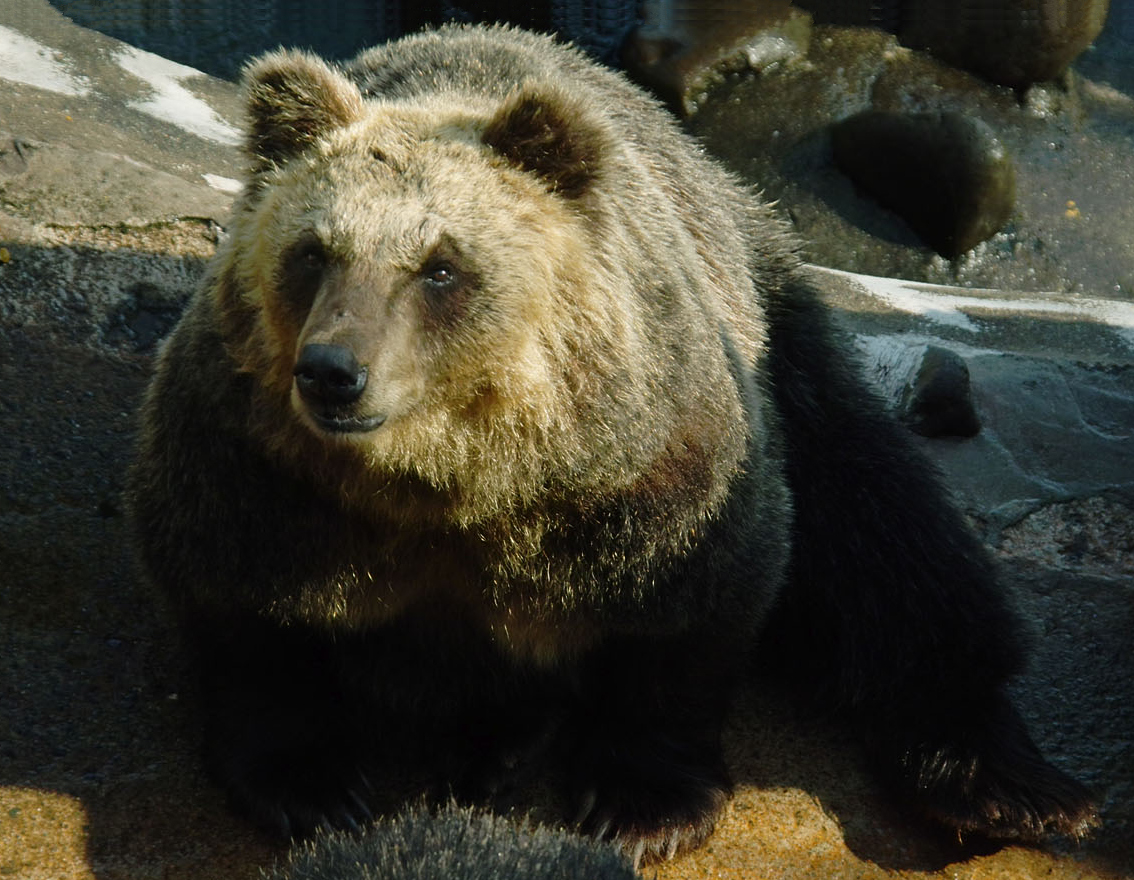
A Japanese brown bear at a zoo

On December 9, 1915, at 10:30 a.m., the giant brown bear turned up at the home of the Ōta family. Abe Mayu, the farmer's wife, and Hasumi Mikio, a baby being cared for by Mayu, were at the house. Mikio was bitten on the head and killed. Mayu fought back, apparently by throwing firewood, and tried to escape. She was overtaken, knocked down, and dragged into the Imperial Forest of Sankebetsu. According to contemporary descriptions, the scene resembled a slaughterhouse, with blood puddled on the farmhouse floor.

=== December 10 ===
==== Search ====
Early in the morning, Saitō Ishigorō and Miyoke Yasutarō left the village on errands. Meanwhile, a thirty-man search party was organized to capture the brown bear and recover the remains of Mayu. Entering the forest no more than 150 metres (160 yd), it met the bear. Five men shot, but only one managed to land a hit. The enraged animal retreated, and the men escaped injury. After the bear fled, the hunters scouted the area and discovered dried blood on the snow at the base of a Sakhalin fir tree. Beneath the snow was the corpse of Mayu with only the head and parts of the legs remaining. The bear had stashed the body of Mayu in the snow in an attempt to preserve it, as well as to hide it from scavengers: proof it was this brown bear in the attack.

==== Return to the Ōta farm ====
The villagers believed that once the bear had a taste for human flesh, its return to the settlement was assured. Villagers gathered at the Ōta family's home with guns. Around 8:00 p.m. that night, the bear reappeared. Although the villagers had anticipated the bear's return, they were nonetheless panicked by it. One man did manage to shoot at the bear. By the time the corps of 50 guardsmen posted 300 metres (330 yd) away at the neighboring Miyoke house arrived, the bear had vanished into the woods. The corps reassembled and headed downstream on what was thought to be the bear's trail.

==== Miyouke family ====
When news of the Ōta family attack was first received by the Miyouke family, women and children sought refuge there while guardsmen patrolled outside. The guardsmen were having dinner when news of the bear's return to the Ōta farm reached them, and they marched off. The bear, having escaped death at the Ōta house, now fled to the Miyouke homestead.

Yayo, Miyouke Yasutarō's wife, was preparing a late meal while carrying her fourth son, Umekichi, on her back. She heard a rumbling noise outside, but before she could investigate, the bear broke through a window and entered the house. The cooking pot on the hearth overturned, dousing the flames, and in the ensuing panic the oil lamp was extinguished, plunging the house into darkness. Yayo tried to flee the house, but her second son, Yūjirō, clung to her legs, tripping her as she ran. The bear attacked her and bit Umekichi.

Odo had remained at the house as the only bodyguard. When he ran for the door, the bear released the mother and child to pursue him. Yayo then escaped with her children. Odo attempted to hide behind furniture but was clawed in the back. The bear then mauled Kinzō, the third son of the Miyouke family, and Haruyoshi, the fourth son of the Saito family, killing them, and bit Iwao, the third son of the Saitō family. Next to be targeted was Take, Saitō Ishigorō's pregnant wife. She too was attacked, killed, and eaten. From later testimony, villagers heard Take begging the bear not to touch her belly but instead to eat her head.

The guardsmen who had tracked the bear downriver realized that they were not, in fact, on its trail. As they hurried back to the settlement, a seriously injured Yayo met them and related news of the attack at the Miyouke family's house. The corps raced there to rescue any survivors. When they arrived, the house was dark but sounds of an attack emerged. Believing that the bear had killed everyone inside, some of the guardsmen proposed setting the house on fire. Yayo, hoping that some of the children still lived, forbade this.

The guardsmen were divided into two groups: one, consisting of ten men, stood guard at the door while the other group went to the back of the house. When given a signal, the group at the rear set up a racket, shouting and rattling their weapons. As expected, the bear appeared at the front door. The men there had bunched up, with lines of fire blocked by the guard at their head, whose own rifle misfired. Amid the general confusion and risk of crossfire, the bear escaped into the night. Carrying torches made of birch bark, they entered the house and beheld the results of the attack.

Rikizō and Hisano, first son and daughter of the same relatives, were injured but lived. The village people gathered in the school, and seriously injured people were accommodated in the Tsuji family house near the river. After the incident, only veterans of the Russo-Japanese War remained at their posts.

==== Yamamoto Heikichi and "Kesagake" ====
Meanwhile, Saitō Ishigorō, unaware of his family's fate, filed a report with authorities and the district police before returning to Tomakomai and lodging at a local hotel there.

Miyouke Yasutarō had heard that a local man named Yamamoto Heikichi was an expert bear hunter and so paid a visit to his house. Yamamoto was certain that the bear was the dreaded man-eater he nicknamed "Kesagake" (袈裟懸け) or "the diagonal slash from the shoulder", a white pattern from the back to the chest, which had previously been blamed for the mauling and deaths of three women in a neighbouring village, but by now he had pawned his gun for money to buy alcohol and he refused Miyoke's request for aid. Unable to return home, Yasutarō stayed in Onishika (now Obira).

=== December 11 ===
On December 11, Miyoke Yasutarō and Saitō Ishigorō returned to Sankebetsu. Noticing the villagers gathered at the branch school, the two pieced together the story of the mauling. A group of men, including Miyoke and Saitō, were formed to kill the bear. Believing that the bear would reappear, they decided to wait for the bear at Miyoke's residence, but the night passed with no attack.

=== December 12 ===
The news of the bear's appearance in Sankebetsu reached the Hokkaido Government Office, and under the leadership of the Hoboro (now Haboro town) branch police station, a sniper team was organized. Guns and volunteers for the team were gathered from nearby towns, and after getting permission from Teishitsu Rinya kyoku (the "Imperial Forestry Agency", now Rin'ya chō), the team went to Sankebetsu that evening. Chief Inspector Suga, the branch office commissioner, went up the Rokusen-sawa with the aim of viewing the Miyoke family house and assessing the state of the sniper team and met all those who got off the mountain pass.

The brown bear did not appear on December 12.

It was decided that the bear would most probably try to retrieve the bodies of those it had killed, but there were no remains in the Miyoke family house. Therefore, a new plan was proposed: to attempt to lure out the bear with the corpse of a victim. The plan was widely condemned, especially by the Ōta, Saitō, and Miyoke families, but it was decided that for the future of the village it was the best plan.

Within the day, the strategy was executed. The six-member sniper team (which now reluctantly included Yamamoto Heikichi) waited inside the house, but the bear stopped, appeared to check the inside of the house, and then returned to the forest. The bear did not appear again that night, and so the plan ended in failure.

=== December 13 ===
At dawn, a search team discovered that the Ōta family's house was ransacked. The bear had eaten the people's winter food stockpile and ransacked the houses. The bear had damaged at least eight houses, but so far no one could find it. The police captain, Suga, motivated the men by cheering from the village outside. Given that there were now 60 armed men, it was decided that they should hunt in the surrounding mountains.

Kesagake now seemed to lack prudence and stretched its territory downstream. Suga recognized the increasing risk of the situation. He made an ice bridge as a line of defense, then arranged snipers and guards.

That night, a sniper at the bridge thought he saw something in the shadows of the tree stumps on the opposite shore. Receiving this information, Suga thought it might be a man's shadow. When he spoke to it, however, he received no reply and ordered the snipers to open fire. At that moment the shadow, apparently that of the bear, disappeared into the forest. They were disappointed, having failed to kill the bear, but the captain thought he had heard some response from it.

=== December 14 ===
The next morning, a team investigated the opposite shore and found a bear's footprint and blood there. Given that Kesagake had again been wounded, and that imminent snowstorms were threatening to cover any tracks, it was decided that this was the most critical opportunity to hunt down and kill the bear. Yamamoto and Ikeda Kamejirō, a guide, immediately set out after the bear. Yamamoto decided to track the bear with a team of two, as it would be quicker than a larger team.

Yamamoto was familiar with Kesagake's behavior and successfully tracked him down. He spotted the bear resting near a Japanese oak. Approaching to within 20 meters of the bear he opened fire. The first shot hit the bear's heart and the second hit its head, fatally wounding the animal.

When measured, the bear was unique: 340 kg (750 lb) and 2.7 m (8.9 ft) tall, dark brown with golden fur, the head unusually large compared to the rest of the body, and estimated adult age about 7-8 years old. A necropsy was carried out on the bear, during which parts of his victims were found in his stomach. It is said that the villagers dismantled, boiled, and ate it as revenge for the victims who had been devoured. While at the time the skull and some of the fur of the bear were kept, they later were lost.

== Aftermath ==
Immediately after the shooting, a huge rainstorm hit the Rumoi and Soya regions from day to day, and the residents called it "Brown Bear Storm" (羆嵐, Higuma Arashi), which has become the title of many novels and movies about the incident.

Yayo, who received head wounds in the attack, made a full recovery, but Miyoke Umekichi, who was bitten by the bear while being carried on his mother's back, died less than three years later from the wounds. Odo recovered from injury and returned to work, but next spring he fell into a river and died.

Some people started to think the bear was a yōkai. After the attack, most of the villagers of Rokusen-sawa soon left, and it rapidly transformed into a ghost town until 1946, when six families from Osaka came to settle the area for a post-war revitalization. The site was restored in 1990.

Ōkawa Haruyoshi, who was six years old and the son of the Sankebetsu village mayor Ōkawa Yosakichi at the time of the incident, grew up to become a prolific bear hunter. He swore an oath to kill ten bears for every victim of the attack. By the time he reached the age of 62, he had killed 102 bears. He then retired and constructed the "Bear Harm Cenotaph" (熊害慰霊碑, Yūgai Ireihi), a shrine where people can pray for the dead villagers, on July 5, 1977.

Ōkawa Takayoshi, Haruyoshi's eldest son, on May 6, 1980, after an eight-year chase, hunted down a 500 kg (1,100 lb) male brown bear who was nicknamed the "north sea Tarō" (北海太郎, Hokkai Tarō) and is stuffed on display at the Tomamae Local Museum.

== Records ==
Beginning in 1961, an agriculture and forestry technical officer, Kimura Moritake, who was working in the district forest office in Asahikawa Kotanbetsu, undertook an examination of the case in order to leave a permanent record of it. Forty-six years had already passed, and little official material was left, so Kimura traced the people who had lived in Sankebetsu in those days and made careful records of their stories. Obtaining a full and accurate picture of events was not possible, as many of the villagers were already deceased and most of the survivors were not cooperative owing to the gruesome nature of the attack. Kimura's account of the attack was reprinted in 1980 and published in 1994 as "The Devil's Valley" (慟哭の谷, Dōkoku no Tani) by Kyōdō Bunkasha.

== Analysis ==
People assumed that the attack occurred as a result of the bear waking early from hibernation because of hunger: in Japan, the term "the animal which doesn't possess a hole" (穴持たず, Anamotazu) refers to failed hibernation. This would have resulted in increased ferocity. However, the bear did not actually attack any human beings until being shot by one.

From the end of the Edo era, pioneers had deforested the area, using the firewood to process herring into fertilizer, and they reclaimed the inland area from the beginning of the Meiji era. The deforestation and increased settlement brought humans and bears closer. The lack of natural prey owing to deforestation and human depredation is a common reason for wild animals like brown bears (or leopards and tigers in India) to search for food in close proximity to human habitation.

== Memorial ==
In Rokusen-sawa, where the attack occurred, there is now a shrine called the "Sankebetsu Brown Bear Incident Reconstruction Location" (三毛別羆事件復元現地, Sankebetsu Higuma Jiken Fukugen Genchi). The shrine, located in a small clearing near Uchidome Bridge (which spans the Sankebetsu River), includes a restored house typical of the area and a signboard explaining the incident. There is also a large statue of a brown bear outside the house.

The shrine is located about 16 kilometres (9.9 mi) to the south on Hokkaido Route 1049 from Kotanbetsu Intersection on Route 239.

Hokkaido Road 1049 was called a bear road, and there are many sign boards showing a cartoon-like image of a bear. These can be found at gates and at the wayside of the road. It is suggested that the posture expresses the symbiosis of wild animals and human beings. Since numerous tourists who visit there know the history of the area, they may possibly interpret it as an ironic or humorous statement.

== Adaptations and dramatizations ==
=== Novels ===
- 1965: The Bear Wind (羆風, Kuma Kaze) by Yukio Togawa
- 1977: The Bear Storm (羆嵐, Kuma Arashi) by Akira Yoshimura

=== Radio play ===
- 1980: The Bear Storm (羆嵐, Kuma Arashi) by Sou Kuramoto, starring Rentarō Mikuni

=== Stage performance ===
- 1986: The Bear Storm (羆嵐, Kuma Arashi) by Sou Kuramoto

=== Manga ===
- The Wild Legend (野生伝説, Yasei Densetsu) vol.3～5 by Yukio Togawa (story) and Takao Yaguchi (art)

=== Film ===
- 1990: Yellow Fangs (リメインズ 美しき勇者たち, Rimeinzu Utsukushiki Yūshatachi; "Remains: Beautiful Heroes") Sonny Chiba (director), Hiroyuki Sanada, Mika Muramatsu, Bunta Sugawara

== See also ==
- Sloth bear of Mysore
- Bear danger

== Reference books ==
- Moritake Kimura, The Tomamae Bear Incident: The Greatest Tragedy in the History of Animal Attacks, 1961;
- Akira Yoshimura, The Bear Storm, Shinchosha, 1982;
- Moritake Kimura, Ezo Brown Bear Encyclopedia - Damage, Prevention, Ecology, Stories, Kyōdō Culture Agency, 1983;
- Moritake Kimura, The Devil's Valley, Kyōdō Culture Agency, 1994.
