= Bear danger =

Hazards of being around bears

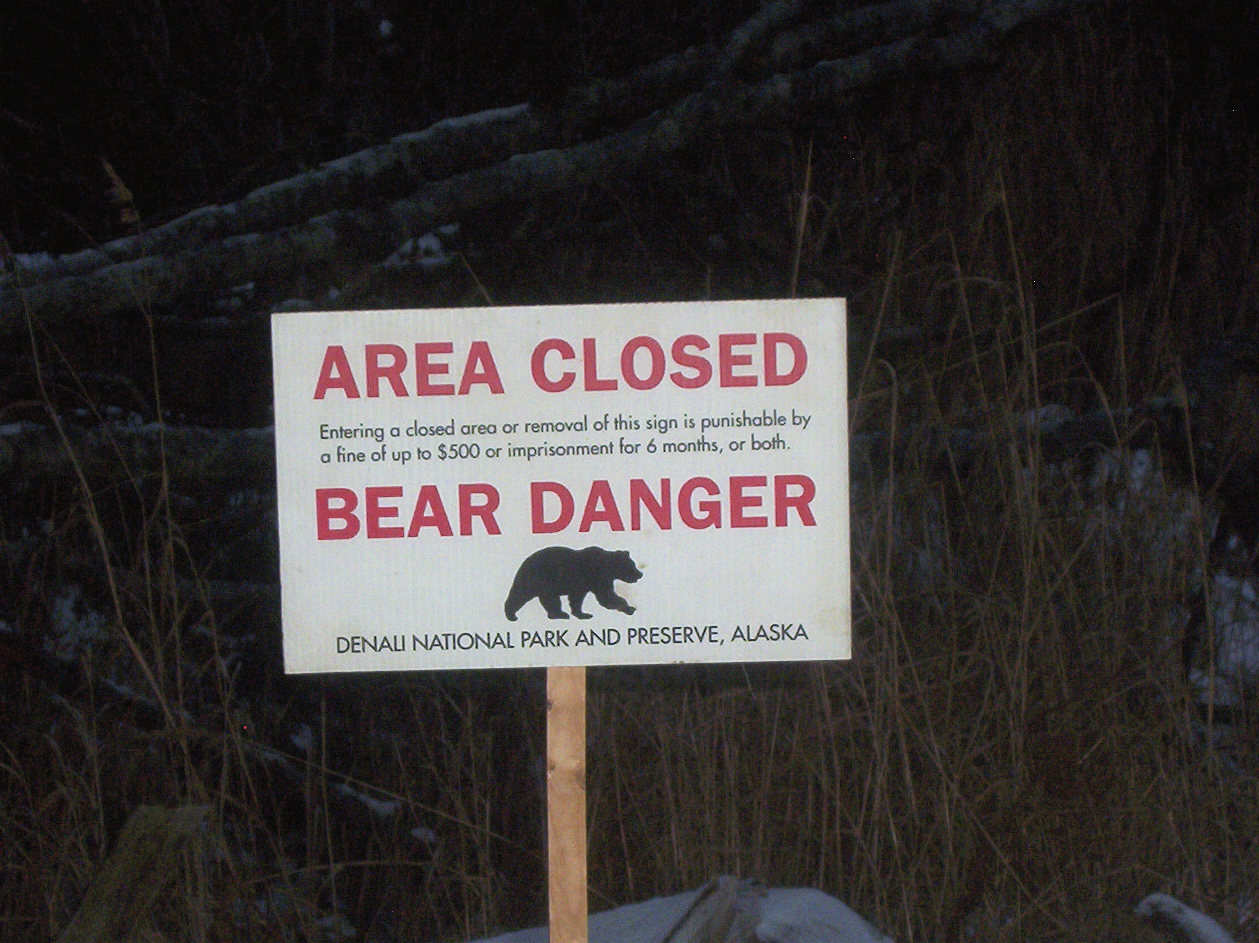
Bear danger closure sign of the type used in Denali National Park, Alaska.

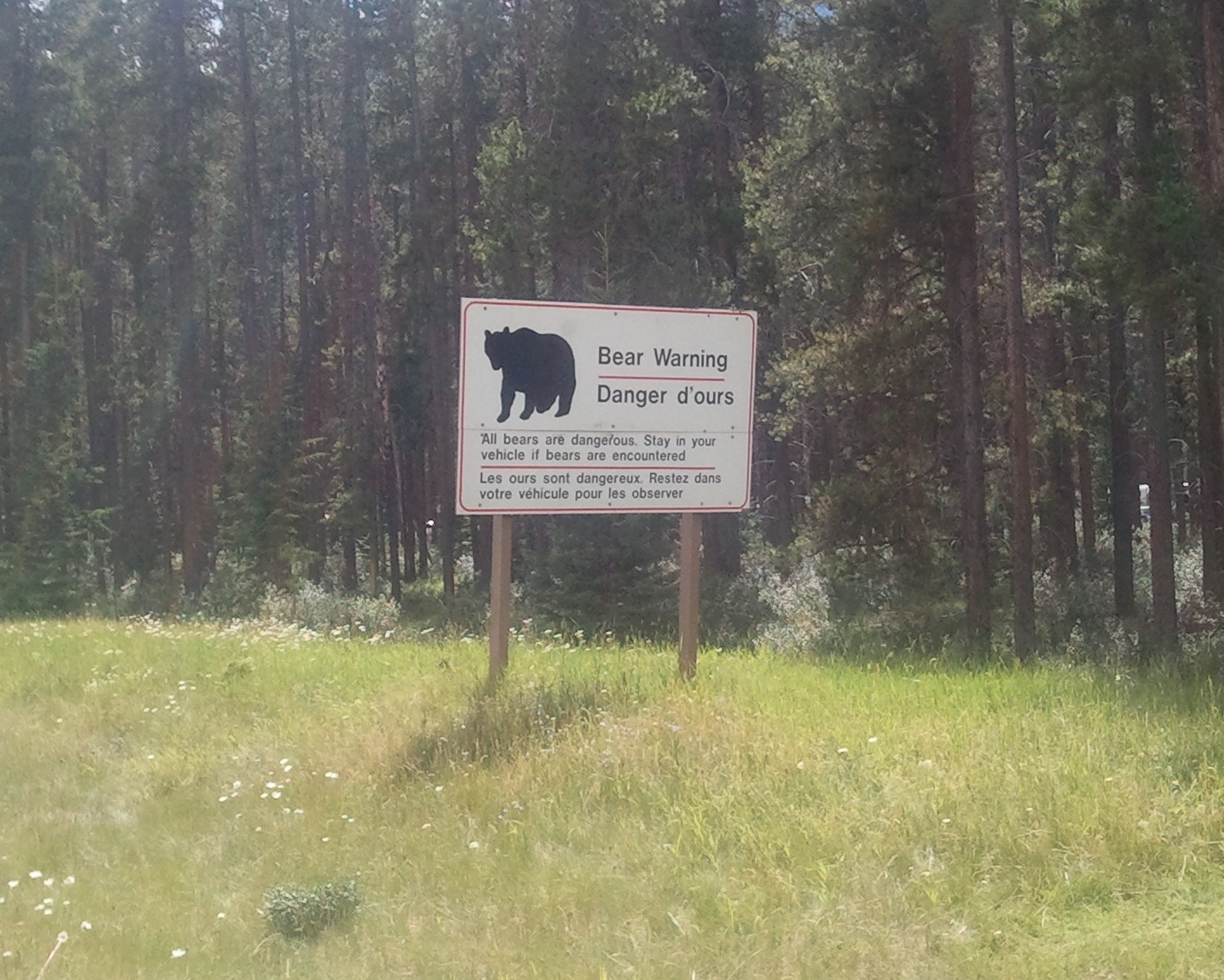
Bear warning sign in Alberta, Canada

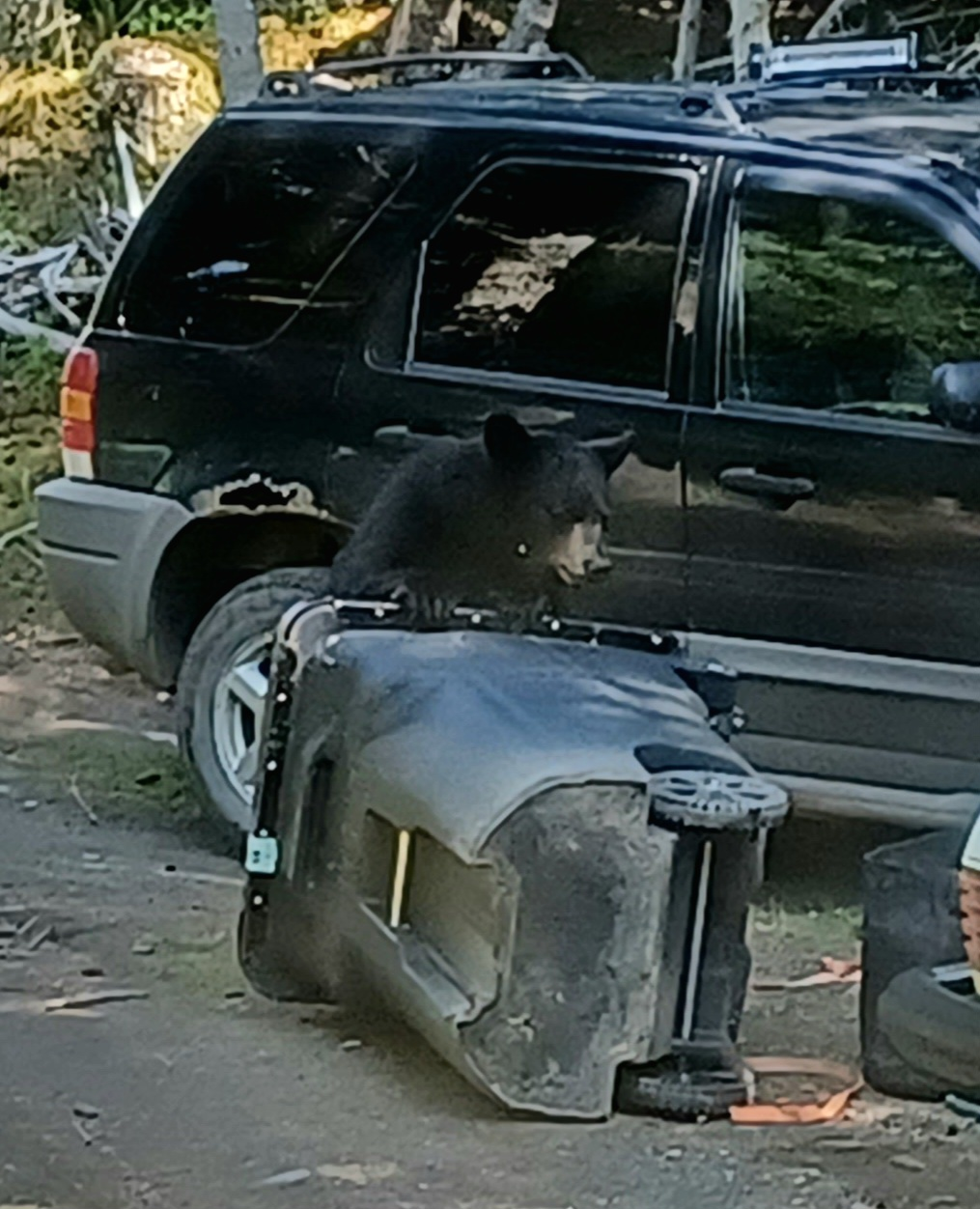
A black bear trying unsuccessfully to open a bear-resistant trash can.

Bear danger is the risk encountered by humans and their pets or livestock when interacting with bears and the potential of an attack from bears.

Although most bears are apex predators in their own habitat, most do not, under normal circumstances, hunt and feed on humans; most bear attacks occur when the animal is defending itself against anything it perceives as a threat to itself, its territory, or its cubs. For instance, female bears (sows) can become extremely aggressive if they feel their cubs are threatened. Any solitary bear is also likely to become agitated if surprised or cornered, especially while it is eating. Polar bears are considered the most dangerous of all bears to humans, and it is highly recommended to carry large caliber firearms such as a .44 Magnum or 10mm Auto, or other large caliber rifles if it is necessary to be in the vicinity of Polar bears.

Some species are more aggressive than others; sloth bears, Asiatic black bears, and brown bears are more likely to injure people than other species, while the American black bear is comparatively timid.

Separation is a key to conventional measures to minimize aggression and property damage by bears. Places such as Denali National Park in Alaska, U.S., emphasize proper techniques of food storage and garbage disposal, closures of park areas, training videos, and occasionally firearms on aggressive bears to prevent bears from claiming the lives of campers.

== Dealing with bear encounters ==
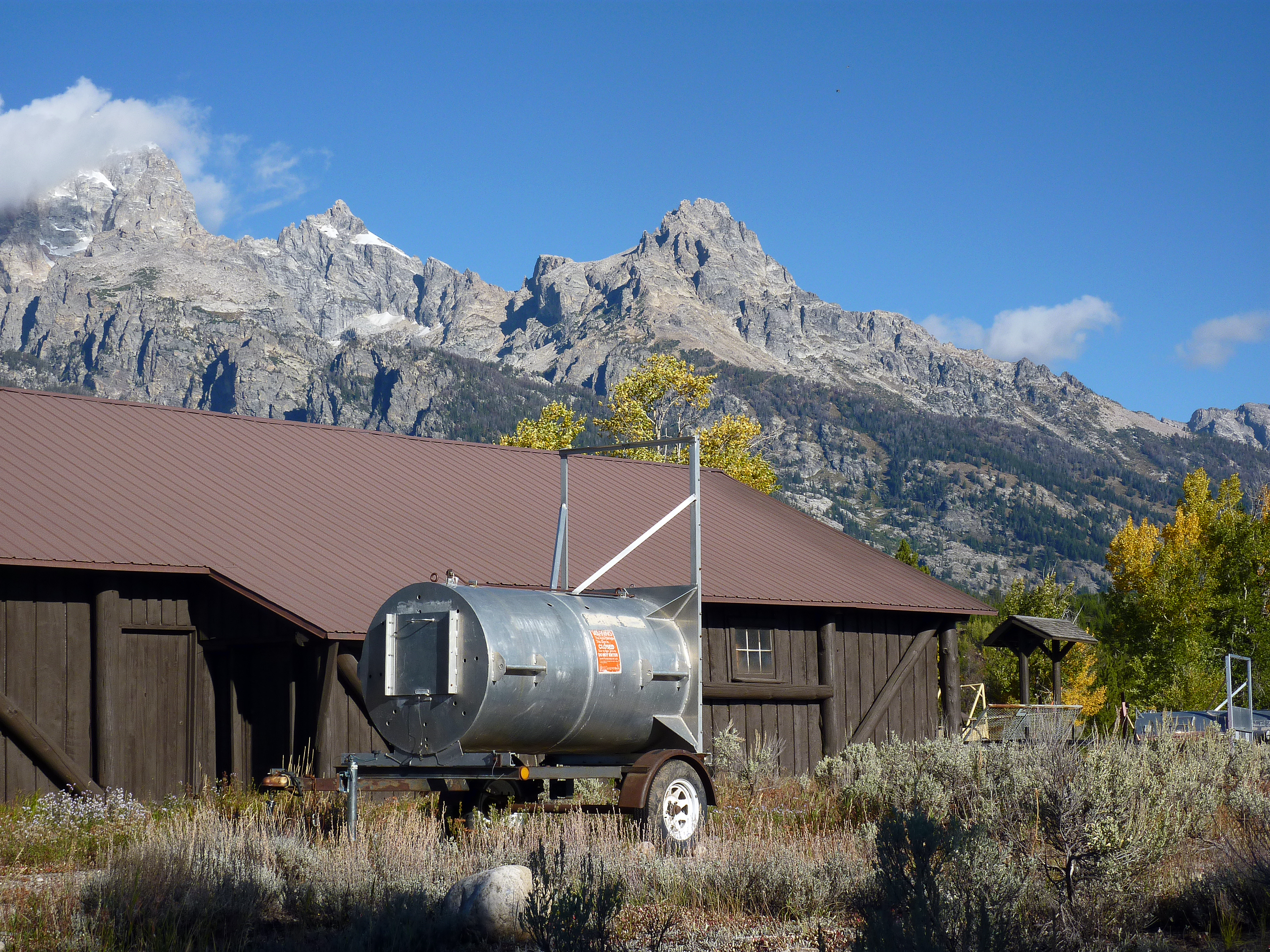
A drum or barrel trap used to safely relocate bears parked adjacent to a building in Grand Teton National Park in Wyoming, United States

The U.S. National Park service emphasizes keeping a distance from the bear and making noise to avoid startling a bear as the best ways to avoid a bear attack. If a bear does become confrontational, the usual advice is to stand one's ground and to not run or turn away from the bear, raise the arms above the head so as to appear larger, and to yell at the bear.

Running away or climbing a tree can activate the bear's hunting instincts and lead to it perceiving the human as prey. If a bear does charge, persons are advised to hold their ground, as most bear charges are bluffs. Finally, if a bear does attack, the usual advice is to curl into a fetal position so as to shield vital organs and appear non-threatening.

If this is not effective in stopping the attack, the only option left is to fight the bear in any way possible.

This advice applies to omnivores such as brown and black bears. The best way to avoid being attacked by the apex predator and highly dangerous polar bear is not to enter any area where wild polar bears may be present.

== Food storage and garbage disposal ==
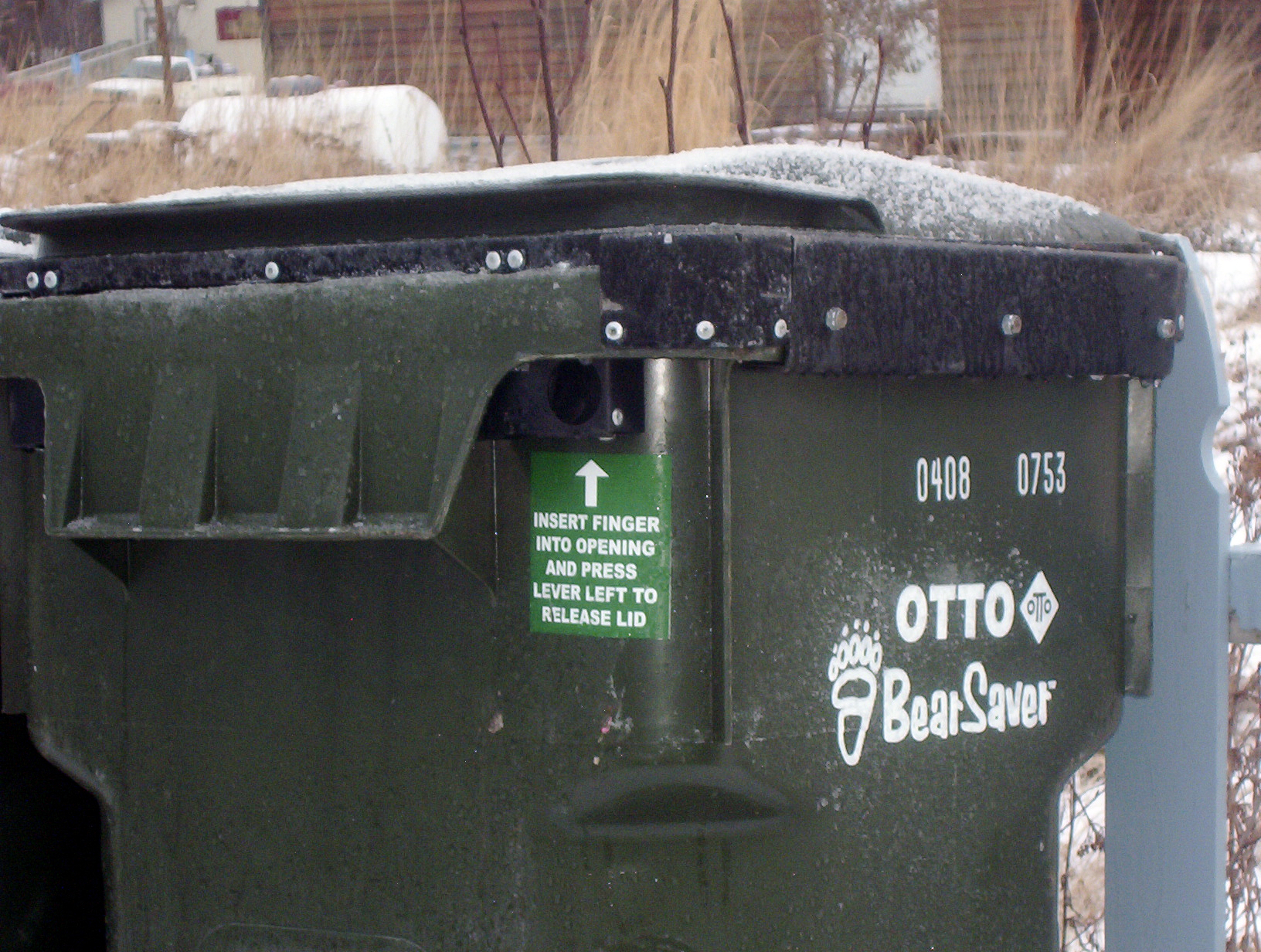
Bear-resistant garbage can. The label gives instructions on how to open.

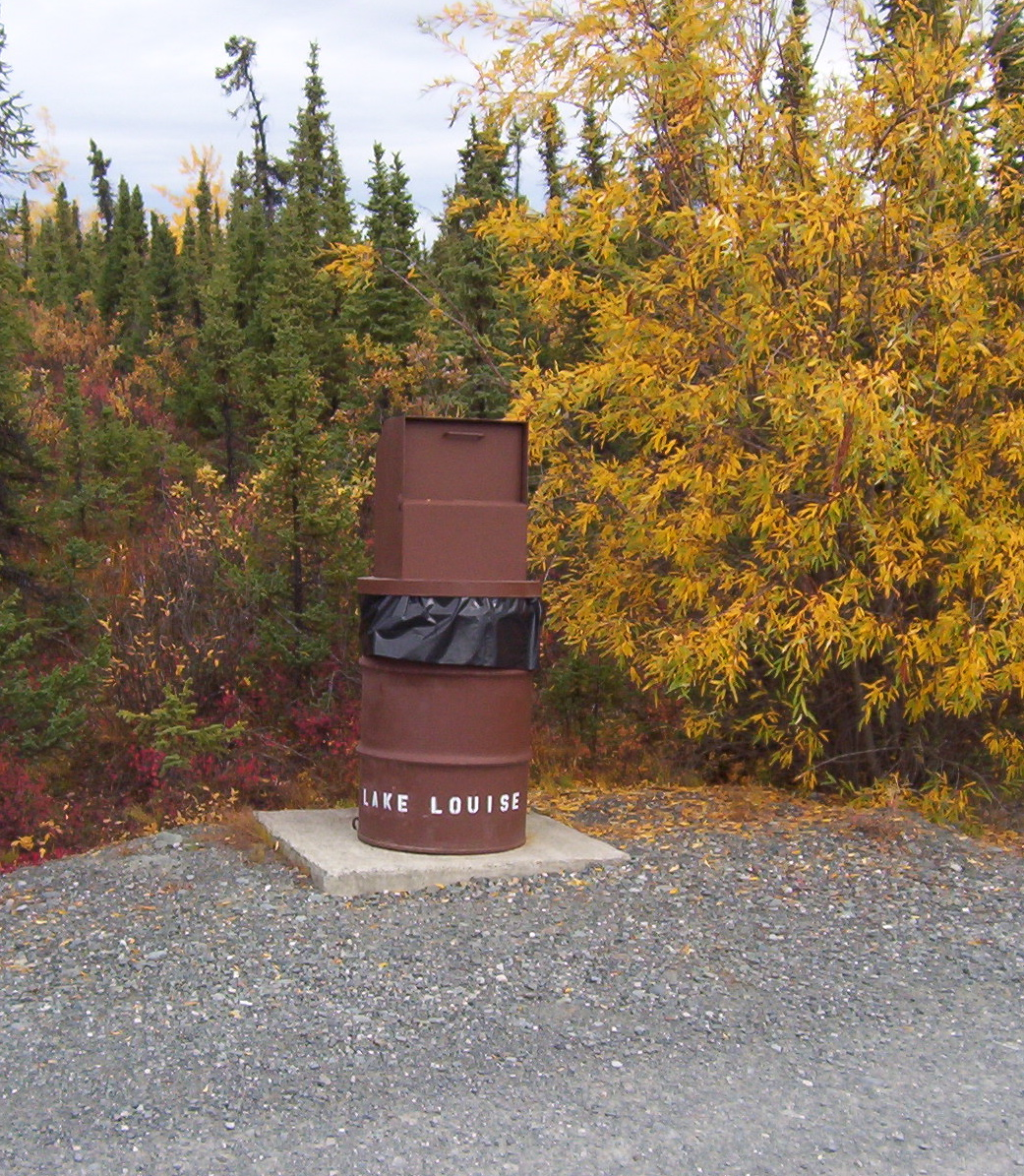
The "postal box" style of bear-resistant garbage is used in many parks and campgrounds

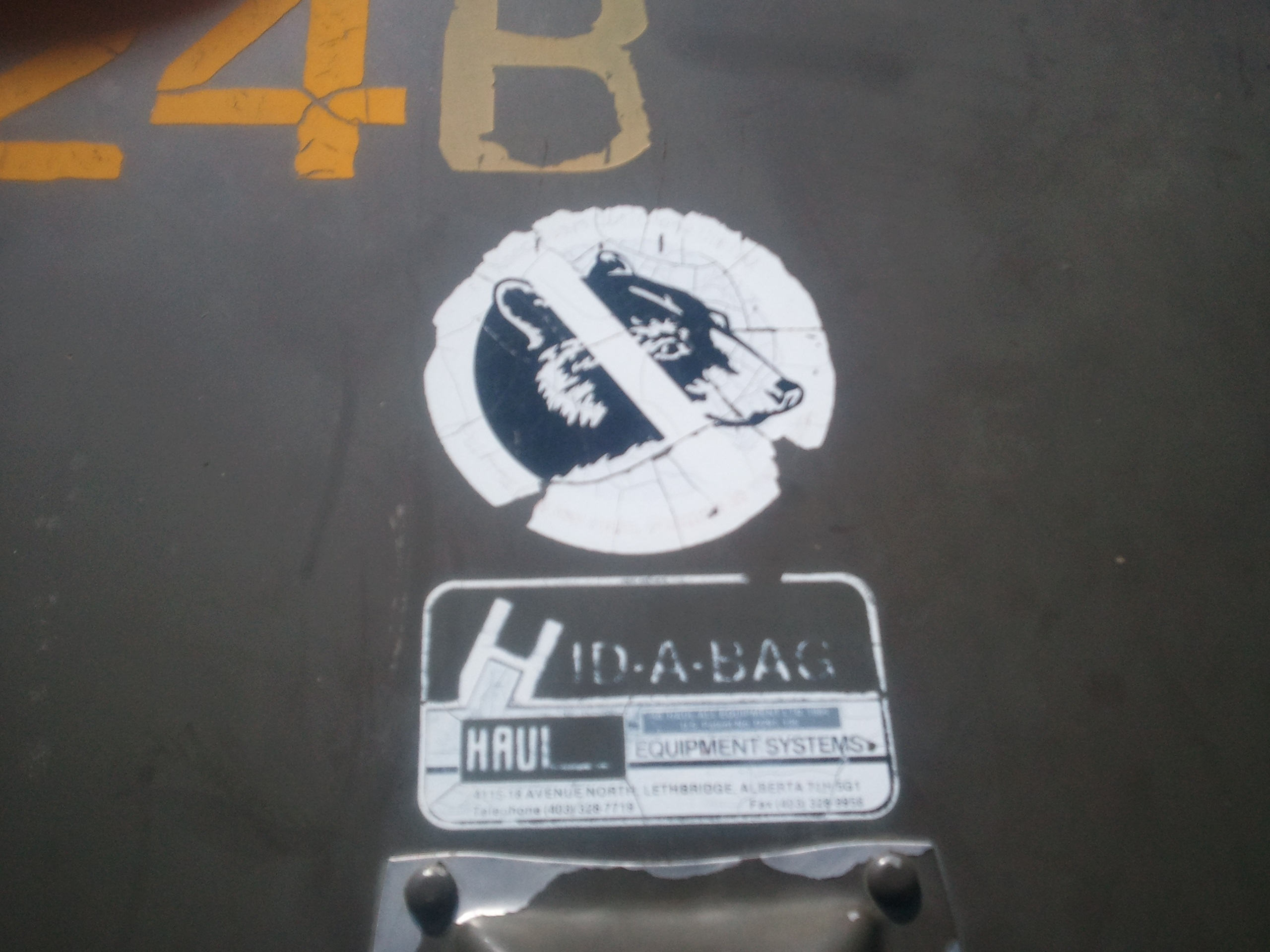
A bear resistant garbage can in Alberta, Canada

Bears are opportunistic omnivores with an excellent sense of smell and are attracted to human and pet foods as well as refuse. Improper storage of these items can allow bears to eat human food and become dependent on it, increasing the probability of encounters with humans. Most brown and black bear encounters in human-populated areas involve so-called "trouble bears", usually young males who have just left their mothers and have not yet claimed a territory of their own. If they wander close to human settlements, the smells of cooking and garbage can cause them to learn to ignore their usual instincts to avoid humans. Many parks and persons in areas with bears utilize bear-resistant garbage cans and dumpsters for this reason, and many areas have laws prohibiting the feeding of bears, even if unintentional.

Campers can access bear-proof containers from many parks to store their food and trash. The containers are then buried or strung on a rope between two tall trees, out of a bear's reach. They are also instructed to put their containers, campfire, and tenting 100 yards (100 m) away from each other, forming a triangle.

== Firearms ==
When a bear becomes conditioned by human food or habituated to humans, and threatens or attacks humans, it becomes a threat. Authorities such as police, park rangers, etc. are concerned with their liability should an injury to a person occur. Due to this concern, they often trap and euthanize (kill) animals that have injured or threatened people.

Many U.S. states with large bear populations, such as Alaska, have laws permitting the killing of bears if done in the defense of human life or property. The previously utilized technique of relocating bears often proved ineffective, as the bears generally would either find new sources of human food or simply return to their old territory. Bears have been known to wander into farms, cattle and sheep ranches, and other populated areas, especially if they are especially hungry, such as when they have just awakened from hibernation, and these incidents often end with the bear being shot and killed.

In Svalbard, which has an abundance of polar bears, any company outside of settlements is required to carry a gun for self-defense.

Bears’ fur and skin provide good resistance against small-caliber bullets, however, large-caliber revolvers, chambered for .44 Magnum, 10mm Auto or even more powerful cartridges, can be highly effective in defending against aggressive bear attacks. Long guns, especially those chambered for larger calibers, can be even more effective. Some handgun calibers such as .480 Ruger, .475 Linebaugh, .454 Casull, .460 S&W and .500 S&W better bridge the divide between long guns and handguns.

Long guns chambered for medium hunting cartridges like 9.3×62mm, 9.3×64mm Brenneke, .338 Winchester Magnum or .375 Holland & Holland Magnum are often considered for last resort defense against dangerous class 3 game, particularly the great bears including brown and polar bears.

== Bear spray ==
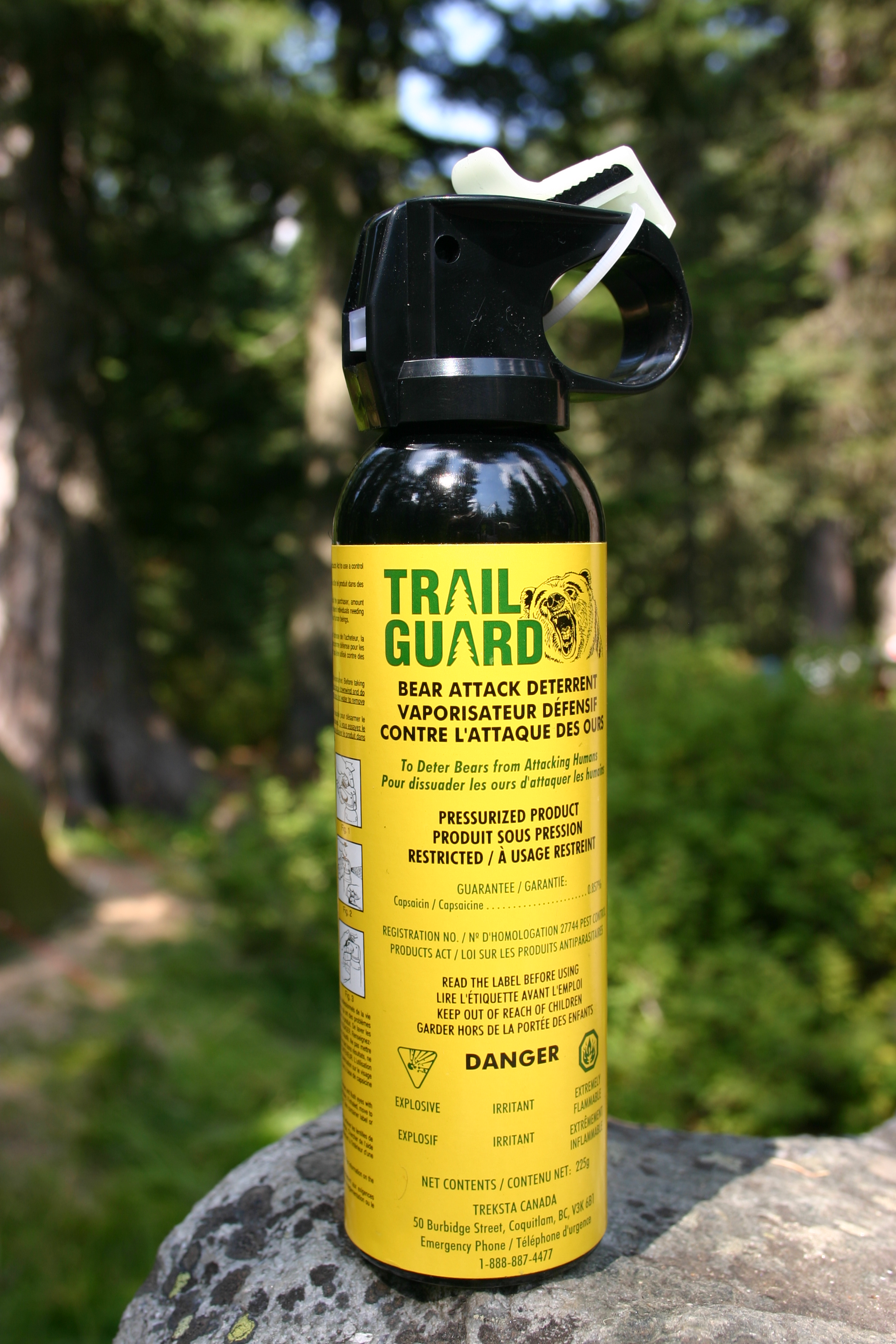
Bear attack deterrent spray (active ingredient: 0.857% capsaicin)

Bear spray, a form of pepper spray, is one option for defense against attacking bears. Of the 83 incidents involved in one study only 18 cases involved an aggressive bear, and of those 18 only 9 involved a charging bear.

== See also ==
- Bear attacks
- List of fatal bear attacks in North America
- Bear cache
- Man or bear

Specific incidents:

- Sloth bear of Mysore
- Sankebetsu brown bear incident
- Timothy Treadwell
- Binky (polar bear)
