= Moritake Kimura =

Japanese writer (1920–2019)

- 木村 盛武
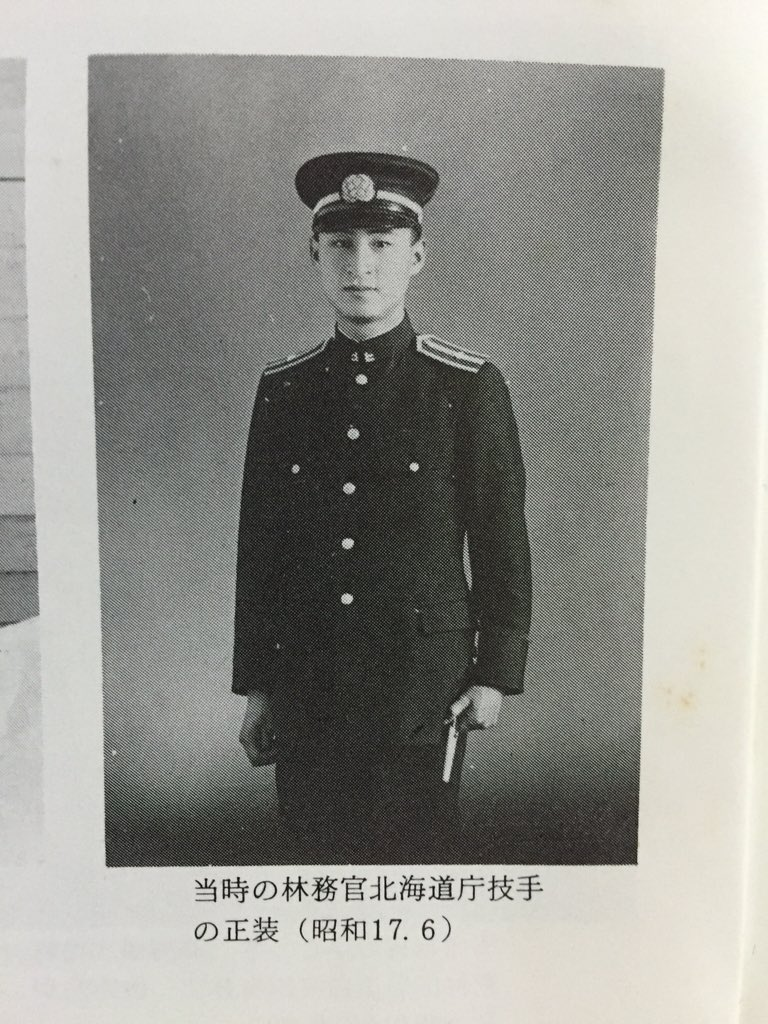
- Moritake Kimura, Hokkaido Forestry Bureau employee, in June 1942
- Born: 1920
- Died: September 6, 2019

Moritake Kimura (Japanese: 木村 盛武, Hepburn: Kimura Moritake; 1920 – September 6, 2019) was a Japanese non-fiction writer. He is best known for his investigation of the Sankebetsu brown bear incident, which caused the greatest damage in the history of Japanese animal damage.

== Biography ==
Moritake Kimura was born in 1920 in Sapporo, Hokkaido. His father, a forestry official, and maternal uncle told him about the Sankebetsu brown bear incident, which caused the most damage in Japanese history, when he was a child, and it left a strong impression on him.

In August 1938, after enrolling in the manufacturing department of Hokkaido Government Otaru Fisheries School, currently Hokkaido Otaru Fisheries High School, he survived a bear attack on Paramushir, where he conducted practical training, that took one life, and since then he had been unable to escape his interest in bears.

Once he graduated in 1939, he worked as a king crab inspector, but completed the training course's first type of Hokkaido Government Forestry and became one of these officers, just like his father and paternal grandfather, in 1941. He then began researching the truth behind the Sankebetsu brown bear incident, for which no solid information existed, but failed to obtain sufficient information through literature.

Twenty years later, in the spring of 1961, he was transferred from his Imperial Family Forest Agency office in the town of Horokanai to the local office in Kotanbetsu, which had jurisdiction over scene of the incident, working for until 1966. He conducted a field investigation and obtained testimonies from over thirty people, including those with knowledge of the incident and their sons. Putting this together, in 1964, the Asahikawa Forestry Bureau's magazine "Boreal Forest" published an article on the incident, "The Tomamae Bear Incident: The Greatest Tragedy in the History of Animal Attacks", making the incident widely known. This was reprinted in 1980, and further published as "The Devil's Valley" on December 9, 1994, by Kyōdō Culture Agency on March 1, 2008, and by Bungeishunjū on April 10, 2015.

He retired as a forestry official in 1980. Before his retirement, he worked at the offices of the Imperial Household Forestry Agency in Engaru, Nakatonbetsu, Ikutora, Horokanai, Kotanbetsu, Daisetsu, and Asahikawa. His home was in Minami Ward, Sapporo.

Since then, he began writing and researching wild animals, as like vegetation sixty years after the eruption of Tokachidake. However, at 8:20 a.m. on September 6, 2019, he died at a hospital in Sapporo due to acute heart failure, at the age of 99. His funeral and memorial service were held only by his close relatives.

== Selected works ==
- 慟哭の谷 [The Devil's Valley] (in Japanese). Kyōdō Culture Agency. 1994. ISBN 978-4-905664-89-5.
- エゾヒグマ百科 - 被害・予防・生態・故事 [Ezo Brown Bear Encyclopedia - Damage, Prevention, Ecology, Stories] (in Japanese). Kyōdō Culture Agency. 1983. ISBN 4905664144.
- 魚名博物記 - ものしりエピソード [Fish Name History - Knowledge Episode] (in Japanese). Kyōdō Culture Agency. 1986. ISBN 4905664322.
- 野生の事件簿 - 北の動物たち [Wild Case Files - Animals of the North] (in Japanese). Hokkaido Shimbun Press. 1989. ISBN 4893635379.
- 春告獣（エゾヒグマ）- ヒグマのことがわかる本 [Spring Announcement Beast (Ezo Brown Bear) - A Book to Learn About Brown Bears] (in Japanese). Kyōdō Culture Agency. 1995. ISBN 978-4905664901.
- 北の魚博物誌 [Northern Fish Natural History] (in Japanese). Hokkaido Shimbun Press. 1997. ISBN 4893638548.
- ヒグマそこが知りたい - 理解と予防のための10章 [What You Want to Know About Brown Bears - 10 Chapters for Understanding and Prevention] (in Japanese). Kyōdō Culture Agency. 2001. ISBN 487739057X.
- あぁ、一兵卒 - ある戦争体験者の証言 [Ah, Private - Testimony of a War Experience] (in Japanese). Kyōdō Culture Agency. 2005. ISBN 4877391142.
