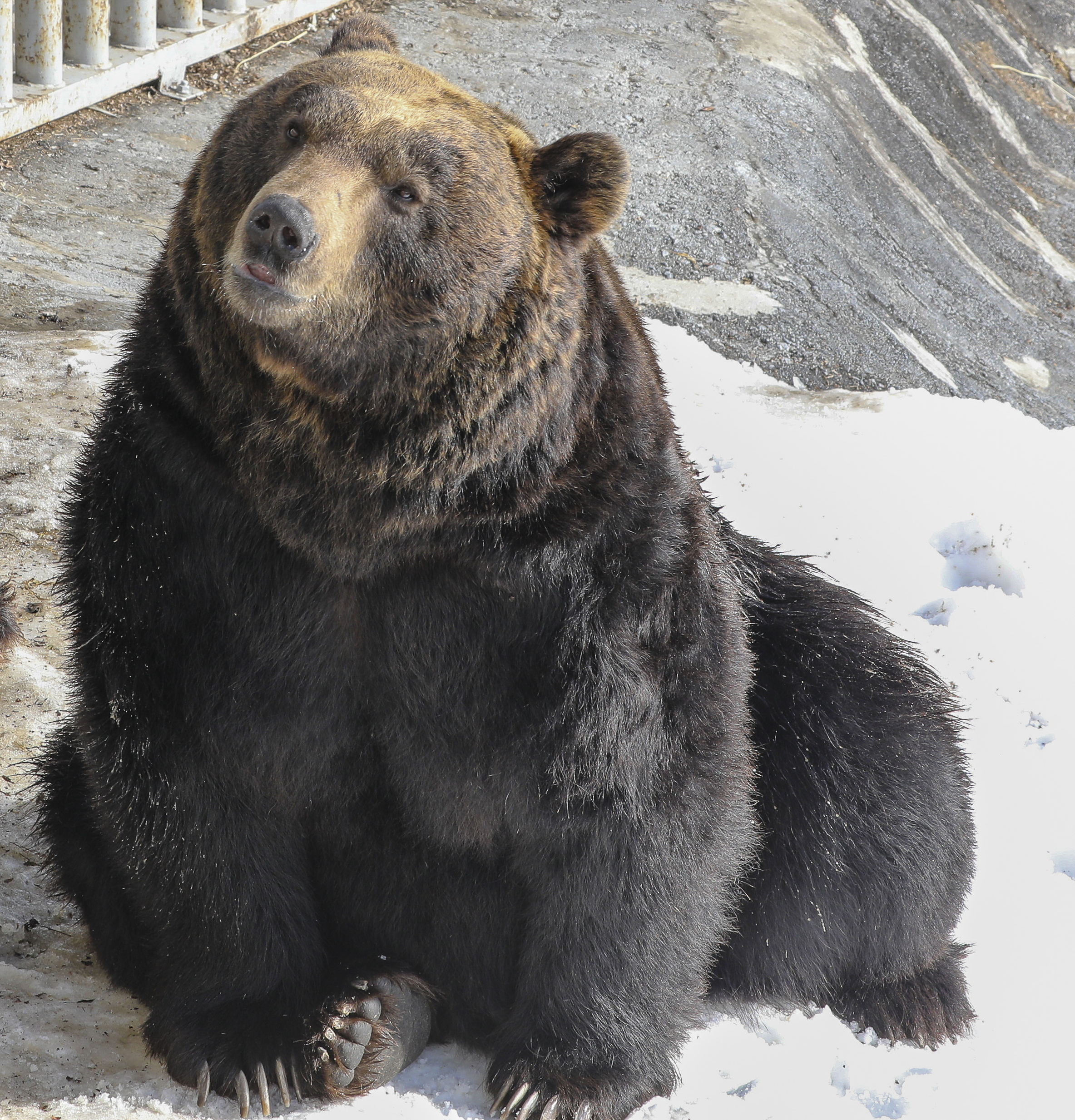
- At the Noboribetsu Bear Park in Noboribetsu, Hokkaido

Conservation status
- Least Concern (IUCN 3.1) (Hokkaido)

- Vulnerable (IUCN 3.1) (China and Russia)

Scientific classification
- Kingdom: Animalia
- Phylum: Chordata
- Class: Mammalia
- Order: Carnivora
- Family: Ursidae
- Genus: Ursus
- Species: U. arctos
- Subspecies: U. a. lasiotus

Trinomial name
- Ursus arctos lasiotus Gray, 1867

Synonyms
- baikalensis Ognev, 1924 cavifrons (Heude, 1901) ferox Temminck, 1844 macneilli Lydekker, 1909 melanarctos Heude, 1898 yesoensis Lydekker, 1897

= Ussuri brown bear =

Subspecies of Eurasian brown bear

The Ussuri brown bear (Ursus arctos lasiotus), also known as the Ezo brown bear, or the black grizzly bear, is a subspecies of the brown bear or a population of the Eurasian brown bear (U. a. arctos). The native range of the bear lies mainly in the Russian Far East, Northeast China, Hokkaido and on some islands in the Sea of Okhotsk. Its name is derived from the Ussuri river. One of the largest brown bears, a very large Ussuri brown bear may approach the Kodiak bear in size. It is related to the North American grizzly bear.

== Description ==
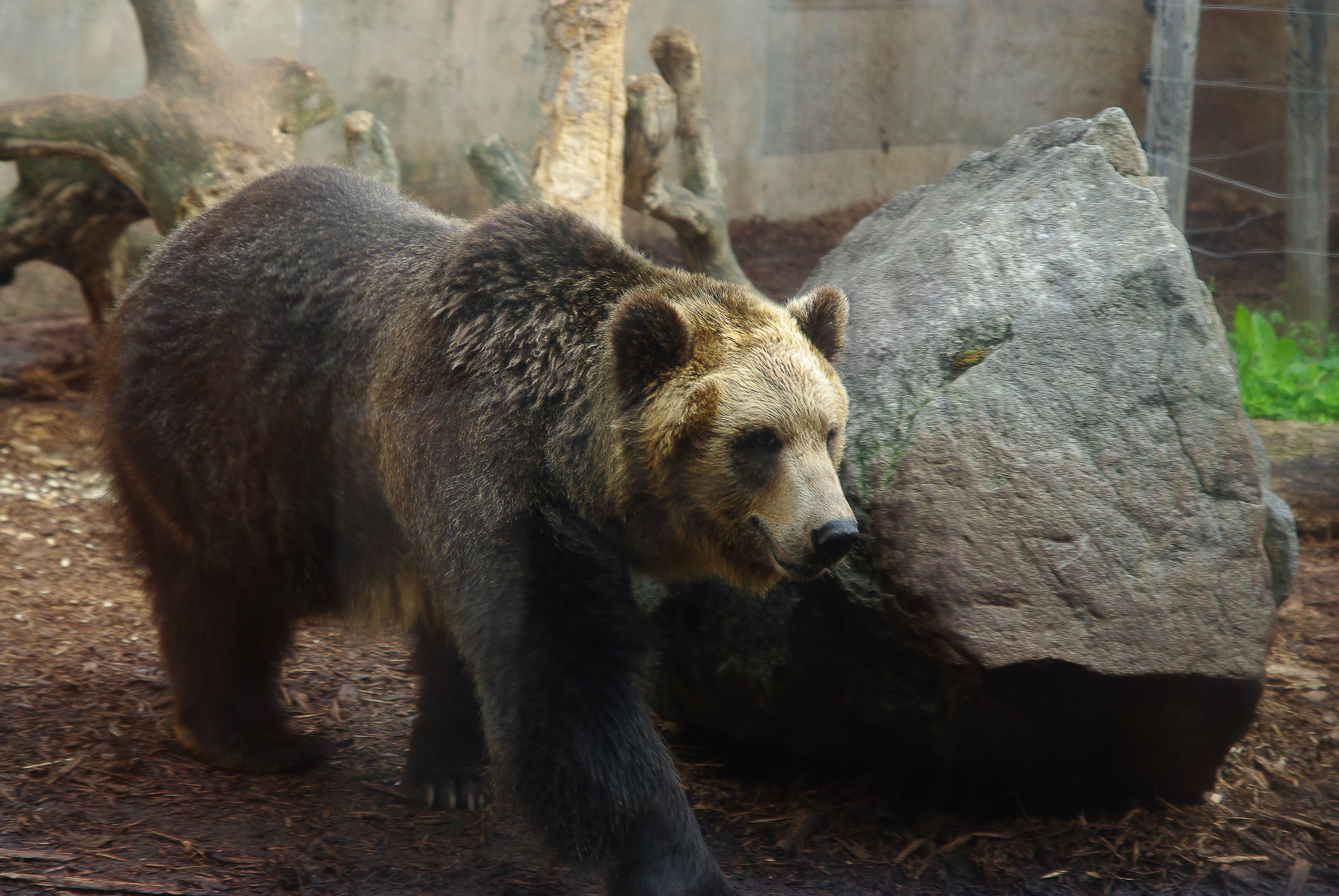
Ussuri brown bear in Hokkaido

It is very similar in appearance to the Kamchatka brown bear, though it has a more elongated skull, a less elevated forehead, somewhat longer nasal bones and less separated zygomatic arches, and is somewhat darker in color, with some individuals being completely black, which once led to the now-refuted speculation that black individuals were hybrids of brown bears and Asian black bears. Adult males have skulls measuring on average 38.7 cm (15.2 in) long and 23.5 cm (9.3 in) wide. They can occasionally reach greater sizes than their Kamchatkan counterparts; the largest skull measured by Sergej Ognew (1931) was only slightly smaller than that of the largest Kodiak bear (the largest subspecies of brown bears) on record at the time.

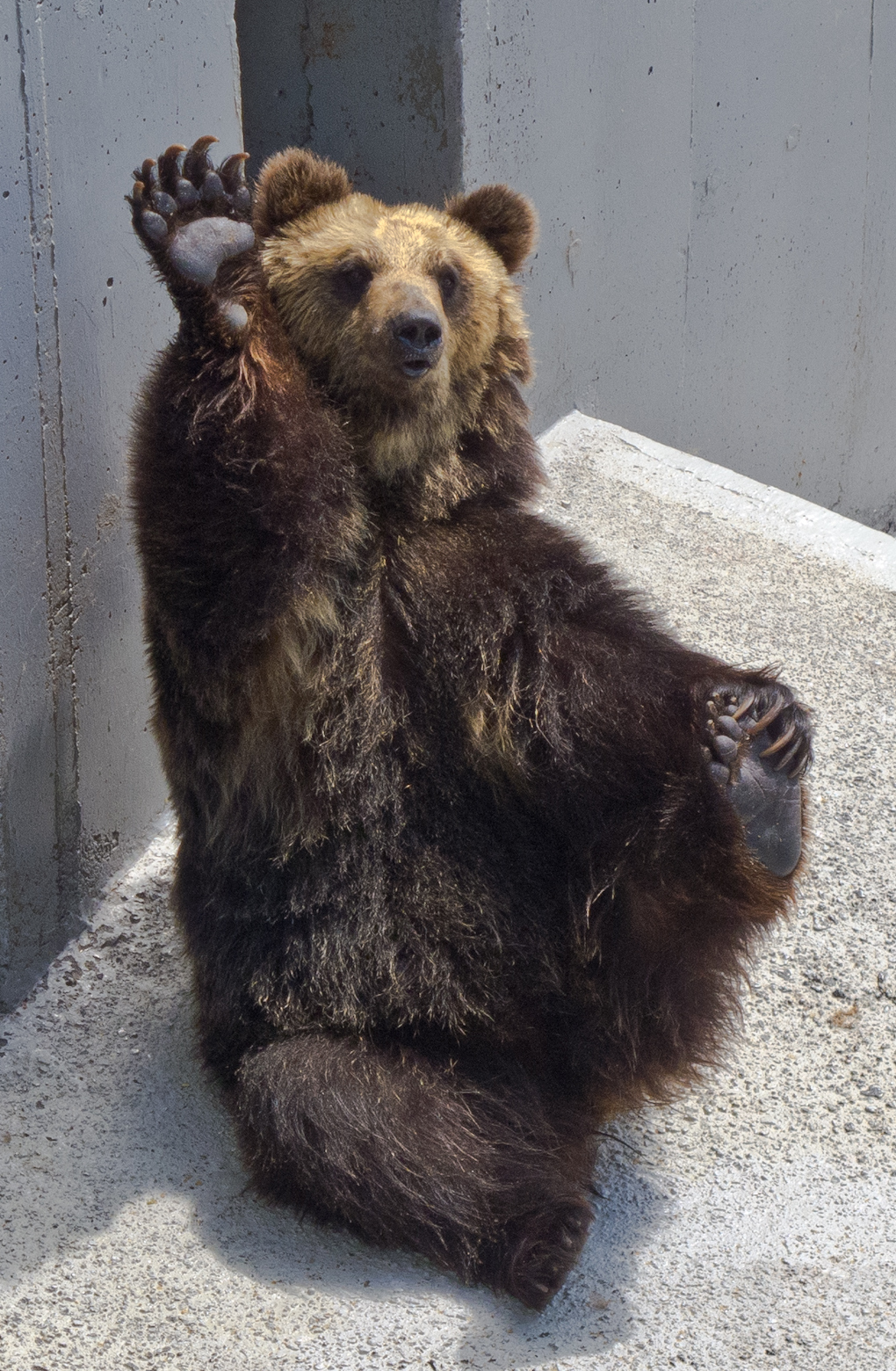
Ussuri brown bear

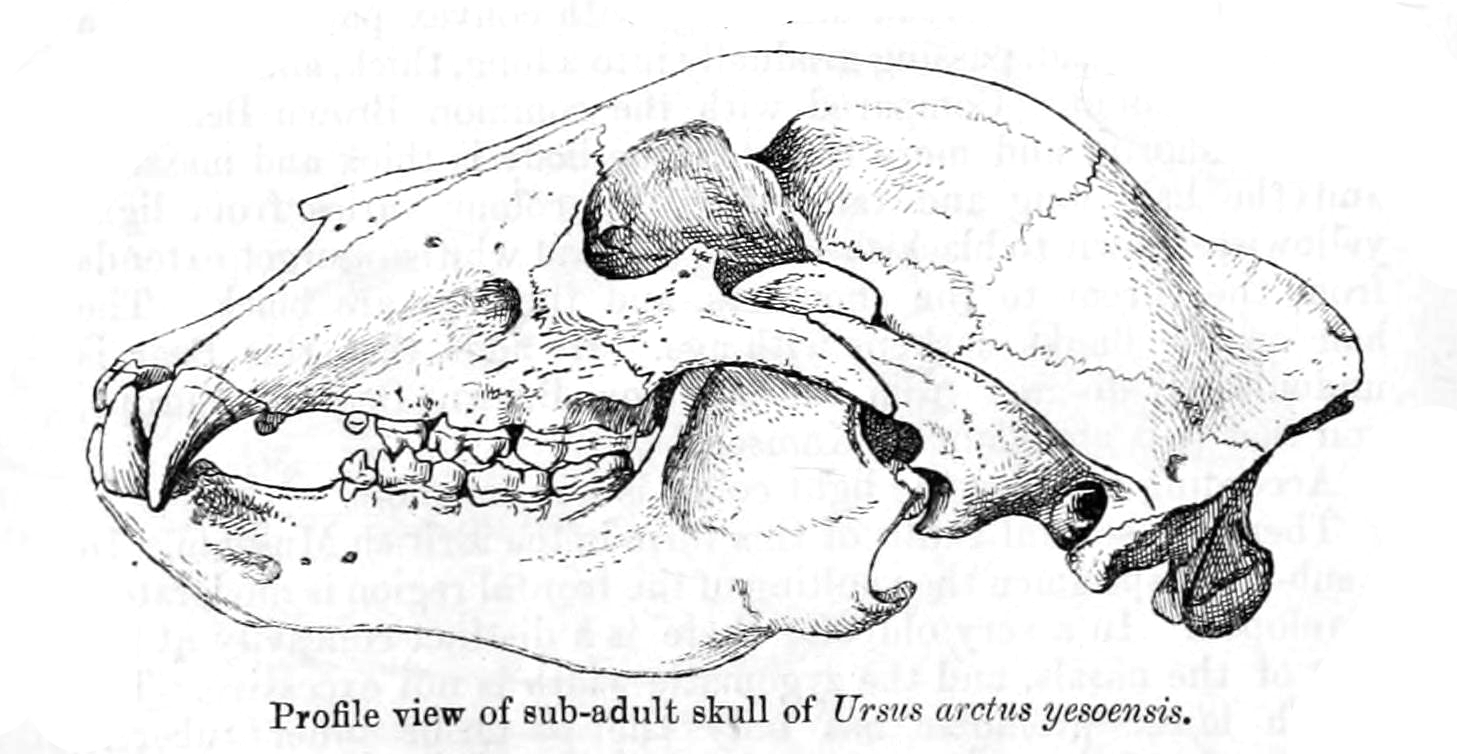
Skull

Brown bears found in Hokkaido are typically 200 kg (440 lb) to 300 kg (660 lb), but a particularly large specimen of 400 kg (880 lb) was captured in 2015. Brown bears found in Kamchatka are much larger, according to the Russian literature, at 450 kg (990 lb) to 550 kg (1,210 lb); however, this is not supported by Russian hunting records.

== Behaviour and biology ==
=== Dietary habits ===
Although the diet of an Ussuri brown bear is mainly vegetarian, being a large predator it is able to kill any prey in its habitat. In Sikhote Alin, Ussuri brown bears den mostly in burrows excavated into hillsides, though they, on rare occasions, den in rock outcroppings or build ground nests. These brown bears rarely encounter Ussuri black bears, as they den at higher elevations and on steeper slopes than the latter species. They may, on rare occasions, attack their smaller black relatives.

In middle Sakhalin in spring, brown bears feed on the previous year's red bilberry, ants, and marine carrion, and at the end of the season, they concentrate on the shoots and rhizomes of tall grasses. On the southern part of the island, they feed primarily on marine carrion, as well as insects and maple twigs. In springtime in Sikhote Alin, they feed on acorns, Manchurian walnuts, and Korean nut pine seeds. In times of scarcity, in addition to bilberries and nuts, they feed on larvae, wood-boring ants, and lily roots. In early summer, they strip bark from white-barked fir trees and feed on the cambium and sap. They also eat berries from honeysuckle, yew, Amur grape, and buckthorn. In southern Sakhalin, their summer diet consists of currants and chokeberries. In August on the middle part of the island, fish comprise 28% of their diet.

In Hokkaido, the brown bears' diet includes small and large mammals, fish, birds, and insects such as ants.

=== Interspecific competitions ===
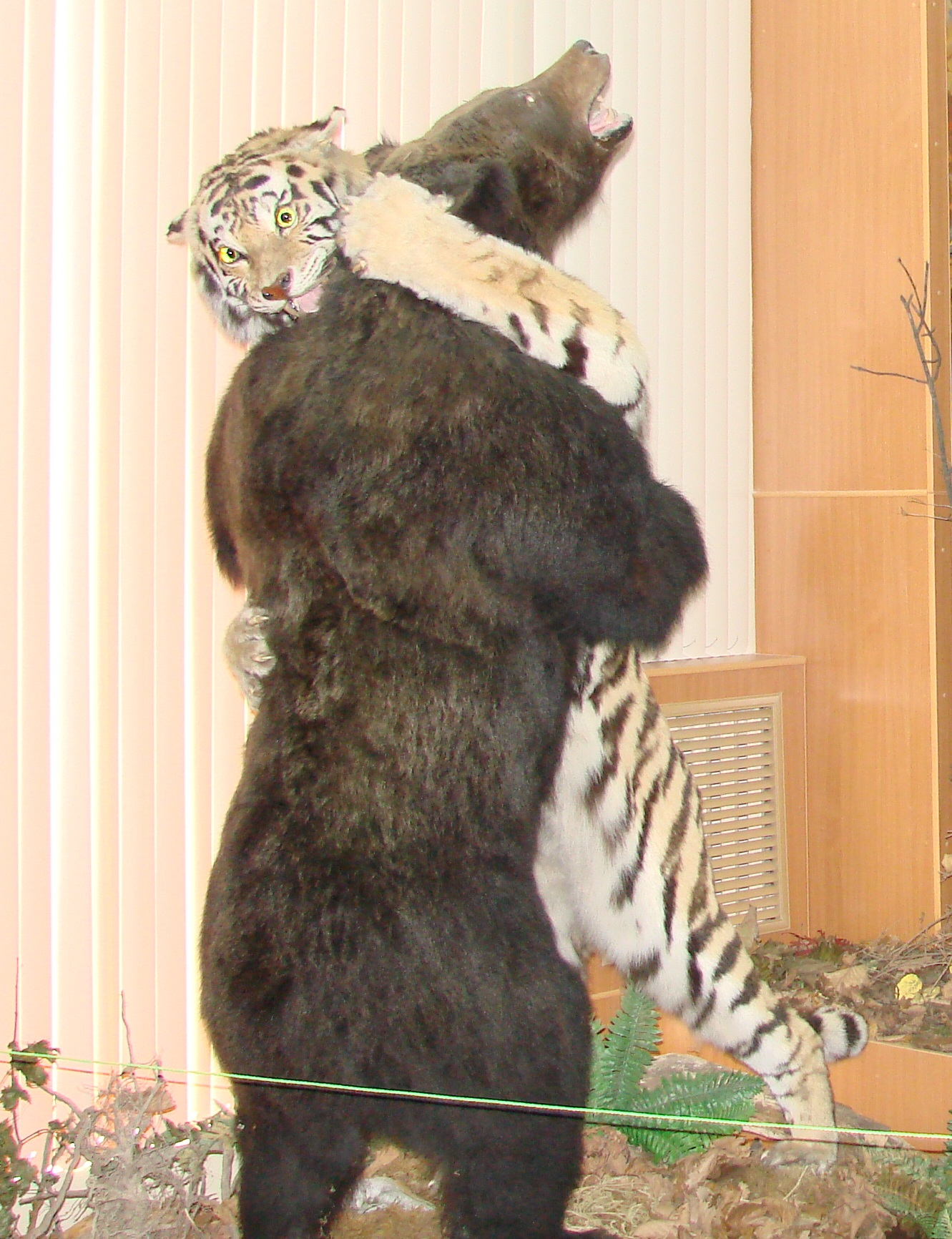
Taxidermy exhibit portraying a brown bear fighting a Siberian tiger, Vladivostok Museum

Adult bears are generally immune to predatory attacks except from Siberian (Amur) tigers and other bears.

Following a decrease of ungulate populations from 1944 to 1959, 32 cases of Siberian tigers attacking both Ussuri brown (Ursus arctos lasiotus) and Ussuri black bears (U. thibetanus ussuricus) were recorded in the Russian Far East, and hair of bears were found in several tiger scat samples. Tigers attack black bears less often than brown bears, as the latter live in more open habitats and are not able to climb trees. In the same time period, four cases of brown bears killing female tigers and young cubs were reported, both in disputes over prey and in self-defense. Tigers mainly feed on the bear's fat deposits, such as the back, hams and groin.

When Amur tigers prey on brown bears, they usually target young and sub-adult bears, besides small female adults taken outside their dens, generally when lethargic from hibernation. Predation by tigers on denned brown bears was not detected during a study carried out between 1993 and 2002. Ussuri brown bears, along with the smaller black bears constitute 2.1% of the Siberian tiger's annual diet, of which 1.4% are brown bears. Ussuri brown bears that exceed 300 kg are reported to be invulnerable to attacks by Siberian tigers.

The effect the presence of tigers has on brown bear behavior seems to vary. In the winters of 1970–1973, Yudakov and Nikolaev recorded two cases of bears showing no fear of tigers and another case of a brown bear changing path upon crossing tiger tracks. Other researchers have observed bears following tiger tracks to scavenge tiger kills and to potentially prey on tigers. Despite the threat of predation, some brown bears actually benefit from the presence of tigers by appropriating tiger kills of prey that the bears may not be able to successfully hunt themselves. Brown bears generally prefer to contest the much smaller female tigers. During telemetry research in the Sikhote-Alin Nature Reserve, 45 direct confrontations between brown bears and tigers were observed, in which the bear was killed in 22 cases, and the tiger in 12 cases. There are reports of brown bears specifically targeting Amur leopards and tigers to abstract their prey. In the Sikhote-Alin reserve, 35% of tiger kills were stolen by bears, with tigers either departing entirely or leaving part of the kill for the bear. Some studies show that bears frequently track down tigers to usurp their kills, with occasional fatal outcomes for the tiger. A report from 1973 describes twelve known cases of brown bears killing tigers, including adult males; in all cases the tigers were subsequently eaten by the bears.

=== Interactions with humans ===
In Hokkaido during the first 57 years of the 20th century, 141 people died from bear attacks, and another 300 were injured. The Sankebetsu brown bear incident (三毛別羆事件, Sankebetsu Higuma jiken), which occurred in December 1915 at Sankei in the Sankebetsu district, was the worst bear attack in Japanese history, and resulted in the deaths of seven people and the injuring of three others. The perpetrator was a 380 kg (840 lb) and 2.7-m-tall brown bear, which twice attacked the village of Tomamae, returning to the area the night after its first attack during the prefuneral vigil for the earlier victims. The incident is frequently referred to in modern Japanese bear incidents, and is believed to be responsible for the Japanese perception of bears as man-eaters. From 1962 to 2008, 86 attacks and 33 deaths occurred from bears in Hokkaido.

On Shiretoko Peninsula, especially in the area called "Banya", many females with cubs often approach fishermen and spend time near people. This unique behavior was first noted more than a half century ago, with no casualties or accidents ever recorded. The females are thought to take cubs to approach fishermen to avoid encountering aggressive adult males.

== Range and status ==
The Ussuri brown bear is found in the Ussuri Krai, Sakhalin, the Amur Oblast, the Shantar Islands, Iturup Island, and Kunashir Island in Siberia, northeastern China, North Korea, and Hokkaidō in Japan. Until the 13th century, bears inhabited the islands of Rebun and Rishiri, having crossed the La Pérouse Strait to reach them. They were also present on Honshu during the last glacial period, but were possibly driven to extinction either by competing with Asian black bears or by habitat loss due to climate change. There have been several hypotheses regarding the crossing of Blakiston's Line by brown bears; there could be three genetic groups, distinct for at least 3 million years which reached to Hokkaido via Honshu at different times, or brown bears from Hokkaido reached to Honshu.

About 500–1,500 Ussuri brown bears are present in Heilongjiang, and are classed as a vulnerable population. Illegal hunting and capture have become very serious contributing factors to the decline in bear numbers, as their body parts are of high economic value.

Five regional subpopulations of Ussuri brown bears are now recognized in Hokkaido. Of these, the small size and isolation of the western Ishikari subpopulation has warranted its listing as an endangered species in Japan's Red Data Book. About 90 to 152 brown bears are thought to dwell in the West Ishikari Region and from 84 to 135 in the Teshio-Mashike mountains. Their habitat has been severely limited by human activities, especially forestry practices and road construction. Excessive harvesting is also a major factor in limiting their population. In 2015, the Biodiversity Division of the Hokkaido government estimated the population as being as high as 10,600.

In Russia, the Ussuri brown bear is considered a game animal, though it is not as extensively hunted as the Eurasian brown bear.

A few of these bears still exist in North Korea, where this bear is officially recognized as a natural monument by its government. Traditionally called ku'n gom (big bear), the two major areas of brown bear population in North Korea include Ja Gang Province and the Ham Kyo'ng Mountains. The ones from JaGang are called "RyongLim ku'n gom" (RyongLim big bear) and they are listed as Natural Monument No. 124 of North Korea. The others from Hamkyo'ng Mountains are called GwanMoBong Ku'n Gom (GwanMo Peak big bear) and they are listed as Natural Monument No. 330 of North Korea. All big bears (Ussuri brown bears) in North Korea are mostly found around the peak areas of mountains. Their average size varies from 150 kg to 250 kg for Ryonglim bears found in the area south of Injeba'k Mountain, up to 600 kg for the ones found in the area north of Injeba'k Mountain.

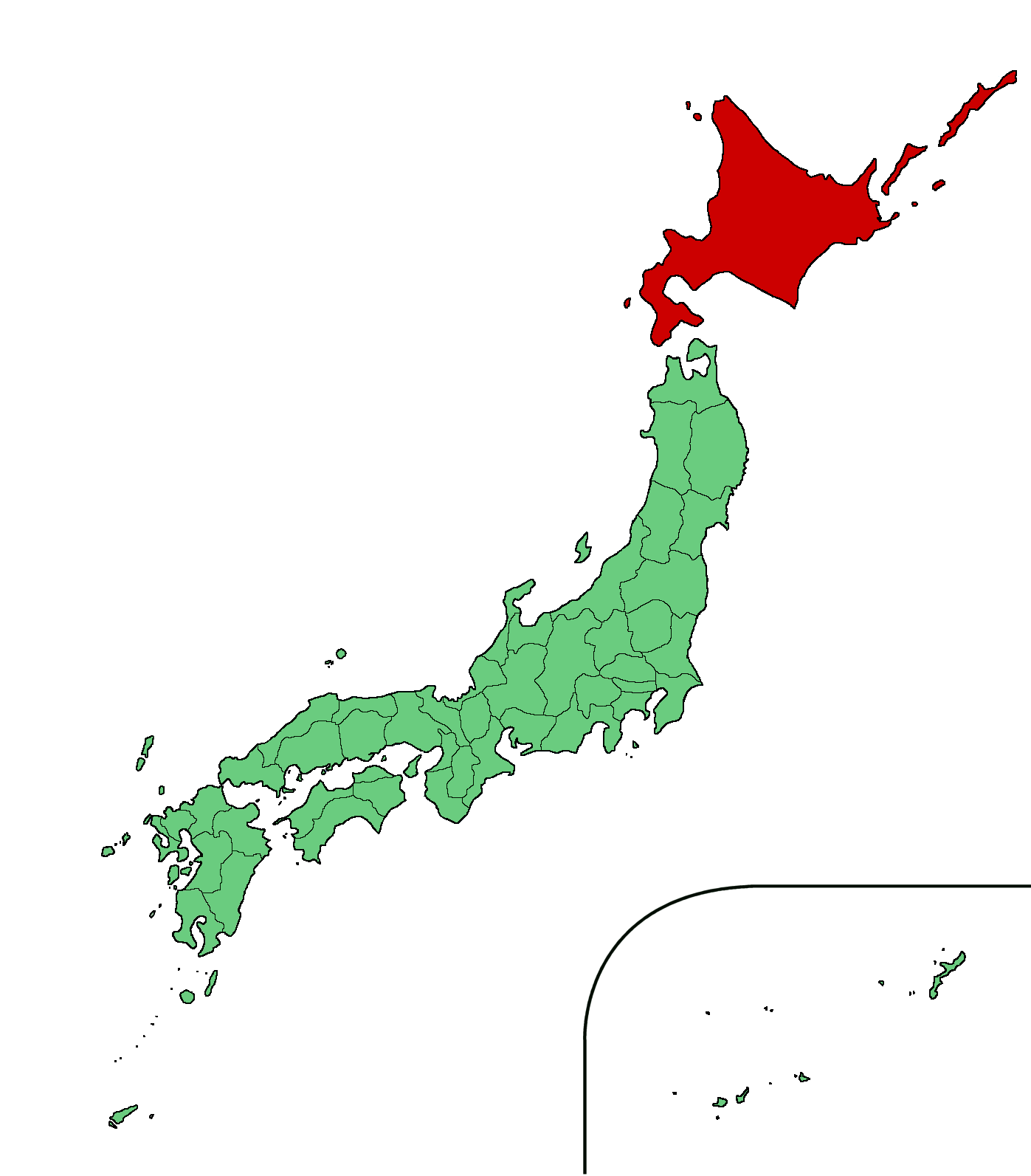
Historic ranges (in dark red) adjacent to Japanese archipelago

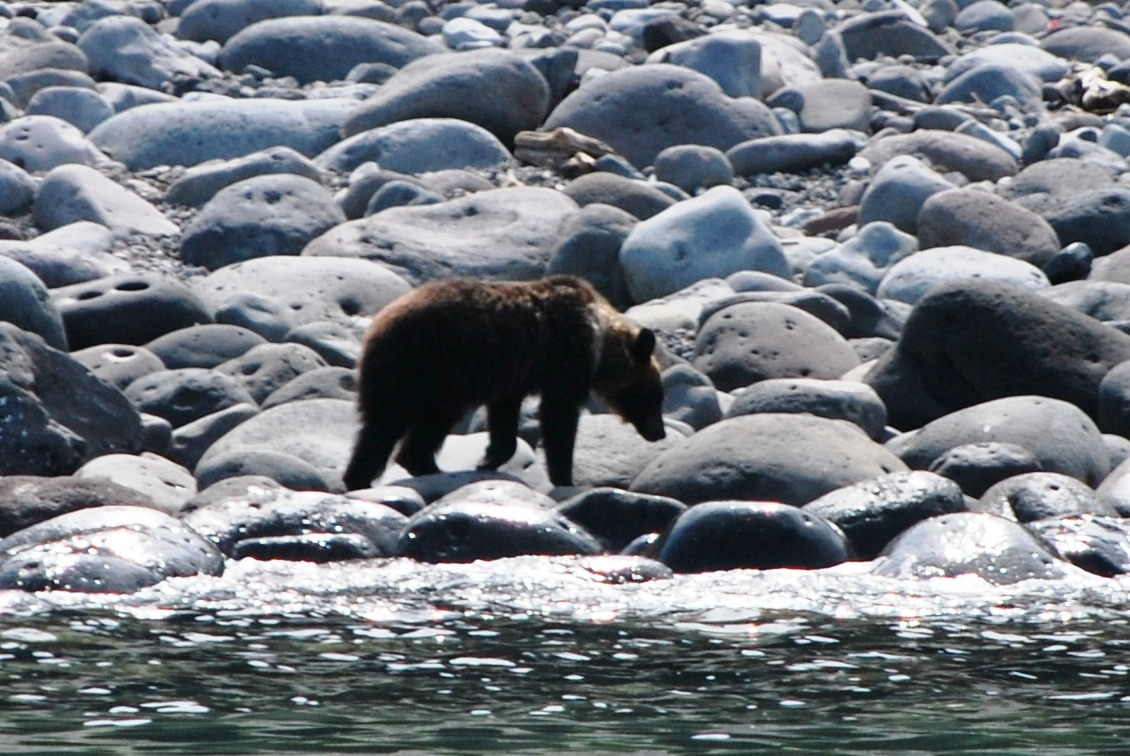
A bear walks by the surf on the Shiretoko Peninsula

== Cultural associations ==
The Ainu people observed a ritual that would return kamuy, a divine or spiritual being in Ainu mythology, to the spiritual realm through the ritual killing of animals. This kamuy sending ritual was called iomante. This ritual took place over several years, beginning with the capture of a bear cub during hibernation, it was then raised in the village as a child. Women would care for the cubs as if they were their children, sometimes even nursing them if needed. Once the bears reached maturity, they would be ritually killed. People from neighbouring villages were invited to help celebrate this ritual, in which men in the village then take shots at the cub with blunted ceremonial arrows, until the time came for it to be slaughtered. However, the "bear kamuy" is merely considered to have returned to its god-world (kamuy mosir), Afterwards, they would eat the meat. Since they treated the bear well in life, the Ainu believed that in death, the spirit of the bear would ensure the well-being of its adoptive community.

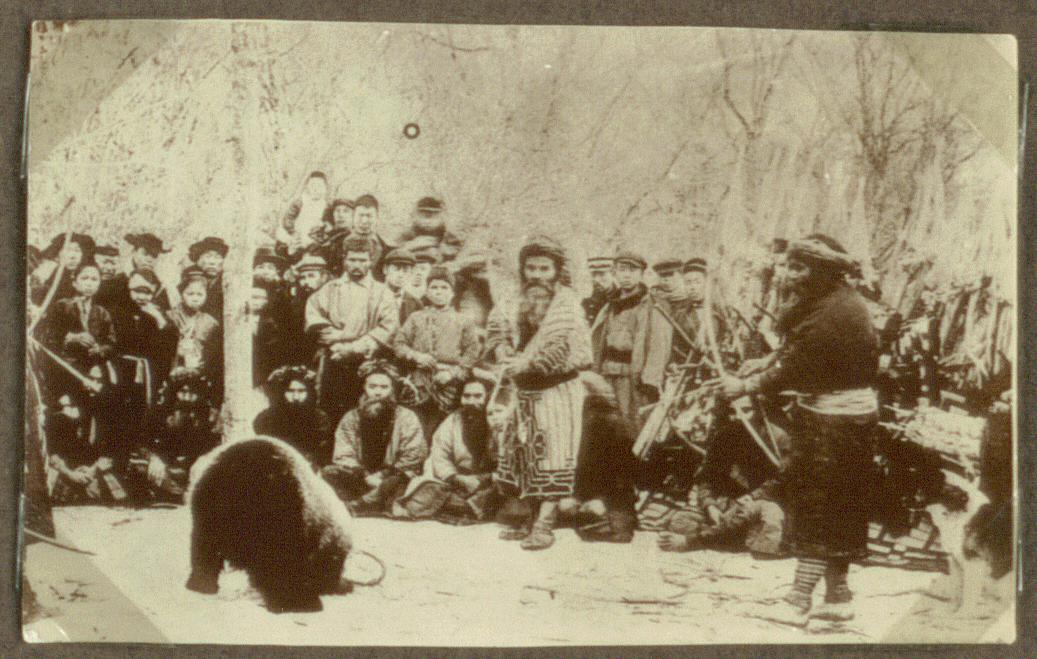
Ussuri brown bear during an Iomante ceremony in Sakhalin, photographed in 1914

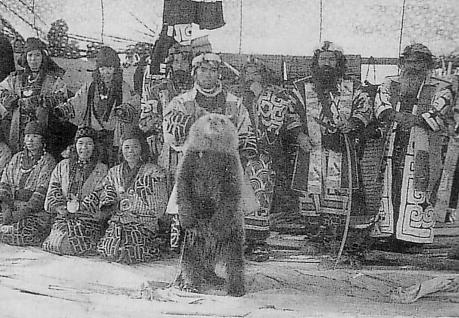
Ussuri brown bear cub being raised for Iomante in Hokkaido, photographed in 1930
