= Bear attack =

Bear attacks on humans

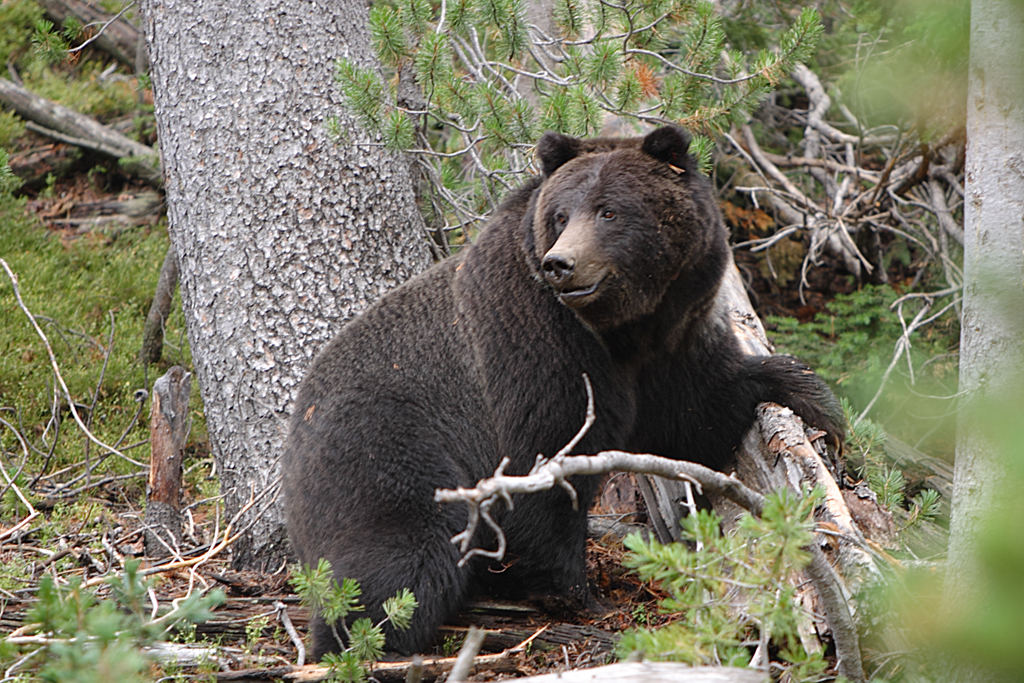
Although bear attacks are rare, they can be fatal.

A bear attack is a violent attack by a bear on another animal, for predation, territoriality or self-defense, although it usually refers to a bear attacking a human or a domesticated animal such as pets and livestock. Bear attacks are of particular concern for those who happen to be around bear habitats and can be fatal, and hikers, campers, fishermen and others in bear country often need to take precautions against bear attacks.

Stephen Herrero, a Canadian biologist, reports that during the 1990s, bear attacks killed around three people a year in the United States and Canada, as compared to the 30 to 50 people killed every year by dogs.

== Causes ==
Almost all recorded bear attacks in the wild have resulted from humans surprising them. Hunters are the people most at risk of bear attacks because, as Tom Smith, a U.S. Geographical Survey research biologist, describes, "Hunters typically aren't making any noise, and they sleuth around while wearing camo." Hunters try to be silent and, though many hunters wear reflective clothing so as not to become targets for other hunters, they try to hide their movements so as not to startle game. Most bear attacks result from hunters suddenly appearing in front of them, startling a bear into an instinctive act of aggression.

A bear's first reaction upon detecting a human is to run away. Fergus lists a few possible causes for this instinctive reaction, each a speculation or hypothesis based more on intuition rather than physical evidence. Some speculate that bears inherited their cautious nature from thousands of years ago when they had to be wary of larger and more dangerous carnivores. Some believe that bears have come to relate a human presence to firearms and other ranged weaponry, that they have come to fear. Still others think that hunters tend to target more aggressive bears, thus leaving only the more shy and timid bears to reproduce, creating a population of bears less hostile than before.

=== Protecting young ===
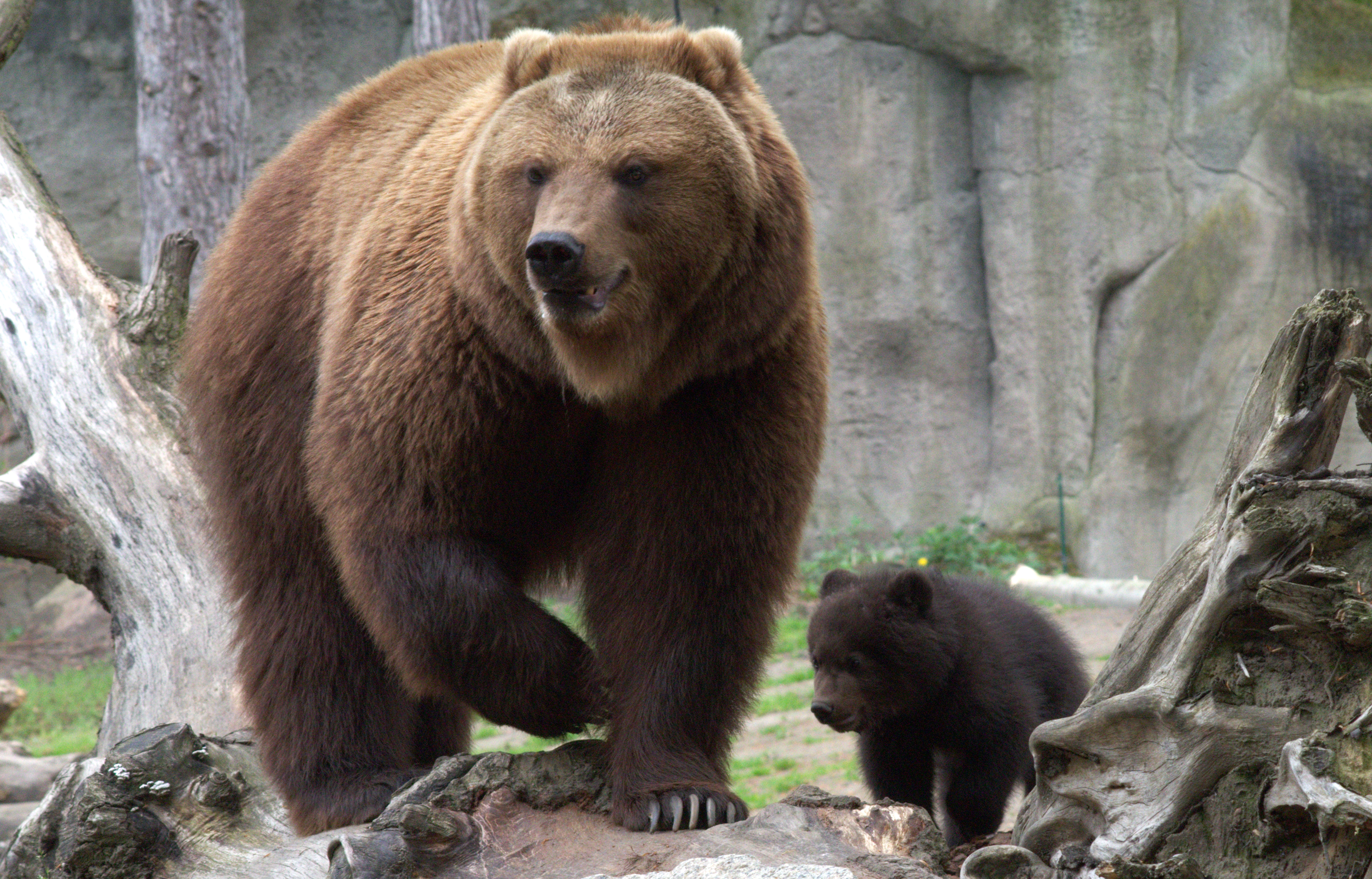
Most bear attacks happen when a mother bear senses what she perceives as a threat to her offspring.

One of the most dangerous situations that leads to bear attacks is when a bear perceives a threat to her offspring. Sow bears are very protective of their young, devoting, on their own without any participation of the male bear, many years of their lives just to raise their cubs and teach them to hunt, hence the term "mama bear" to refer to extremely reactive and protective mothers of humans, particularly those who do this without paternal care. While solo bears will usually retreat, a mother bear protecting her cubs is most likely to attack any sudden threat. Black bears present something of an exception to this, however, as mother black bears sometimes urge their cubs to climb trees for safety instead of remaining on the ground to protect their young.

=== Hunger ===
Another dangerous situation is when a human is faced with a hungry bear that has lost its natural fear of humans. With the decrease of hunting grounds and food crops such as berries and bark, bears often become more desperate and aggressive. However, this hunger has also triggered an unexpected reaction: bears began to follow gunfire because they associate it with dead animals that they can scavenge or steal.

Once a bear claims an animal carcass, it becomes very protective of its kill. This becomes a problem when a bear conveniently claims a hunter's kill, as the hunter may not wish to kill the bear as well. By avoiding a bear over a carcass, the risk of attack is reduced by around 50 percent.

=== Predatory ===
Bears may act aggressively toward humans even when they are not hungry, protecting a kill, or protecting their young. Most fatal attacks by black bears have been judged as predatory. Bear researcher Stephen Herrero determined that in black bear attacks, the bear acted as a predator in 88 percent of fatal incidents.

== Prevention ==
Bear attacks may be prevented by avoiding hiking at dawn or dusk. Additional steps may be taken to prevent attacks such as being loud, traveling in groups, and bear spray/firearms.

== Species, and respective aggressiveness ==
=== American black bears ===
American black bears are widely distributed throughout much of North America. As of a 1996 count, they are found in nearly all states and provinces in the United States and Canada. States and provinces with particularly high black bear populations include Alaska, British Columbia, and Ontario. Black bears are largely absent from the Great Plains region, as they primarily inhabit forests and mountainous regions. In 1996, it was estimated that there were between 735,000 and 941,000 black bears in the United States and Canada combined. Only seven states and one province had none.

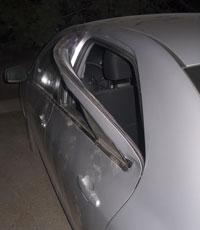
Damage done by a black bear to a car door in Yosemite Valley

Unlike grizzly bears, which became a subject of fearsome legend among the European settlers of North America, black bears were rarely considered overly dangerous, even though they lived in areas where the pioneers had settled. Black bears rarely attack when confronted by humans, and usually limit themselves to making mock charges, emitting blowing noises and swatting the ground with their forepaws.

According to Stephen Herrero in his Bear Attacks: Their Causes and Avoidance, 23 people were killed by black bears from 1900 to 1980. The North American Bear Center states that 61 people have been killed by black bears since 1900. The number of black bear attacks on humans is higher than those of brown bears, though this is largely because black bears outnumber brown bears rather than their being more aggressive. Compared to brown bear attacks, violent encounters with black bears rarely lead to serious injury and death. However, the majority of black bear attacks tend to be motivated by hunger rather than territoriality, and thus victims have a higher probability of surviving by fighting back rather than submitting. Unlike grizzlies, female black bears do not display the same level of protectiveness toward their cubs, and will seldom attack humans in their vicinity. However, it is a very common occurrence for the American black bear to take food from campsites, and even from time to time break into people's homes to get food.

The worst recorded fatality incident occurred in May 1978, in which a black bear killed three teenagers fishing in Algonquin Park in Canada. The majority of attacks happened in national parks, usually near campgrounds, where the bears had become habituated to human contact and food. Between 1964 and 1976 in the Great Smoky Mountains National Park, there were 1,028 documented incidents of black bears acting aggressively toward people, 107 of which resulted in injury. These incidents occurred mainly in tourist hotspots, where people regularly fed the bears handouts.

=== Asian black bears ===
An Asian black bear, shot after charging Henry Astbury Leveson "The Old Shekarry" (1828–1875), as illustrated in Wild sports of the world: a boy's book of natural history and adventure

Though usually shy and cautious animals, Asian black bears are more aggressive toward humans than the brown bears of Eurasia. According to Brigadier General R. G. Burton:

The Himalayan black bear is a savage animal, sometimes attacking without provocation, and inflicting horrible wounds, attacking generally the head and face with their claws, while using their teeth also on a prostrate victim. It is not uncommon to see men who have been terribly mutilated, some having the scalp torn from the head, and many sportsmen have been killed by these bears.

— A Book of Man Eaters, Chapter XVII Bears

E. T. Vere of Srinagar, Kashmir wrote of how his hospital received dozens of black bear victims annually. He wrote that, when attacking humans, black bears will rear up on their hind legs and knock victims over with their paws. They then make one or two bites on an arm or leg and finish with a snap to the head, this being the most dangerous part of the attack. There are no records of predation on humans by Asiatic black bears in Russia and no conflicts have been documented in Taiwan. However, in India, attacks on humans have been increasing yearly and have occurred largely in the northwestern and western Himalayan region. In the Chamba District of Himachal Pradesh, the number of black bear attacks on humans gradually increased from 10 in 1988–89 to 21 in 1991–92. Between 2000 and 2025, the wildlife department in India has recorded more than 2,300 bear attacks on humans in the Kashmir region.

Recent bear attacks on humans have been reported from Junbesi and Langtang National Park in Nepal, and occurred in villages as well as in the surrounding forest. Li Guoxing, the second person in history to have received a facial transplant, was a victim of a black bear attack.

Nine people were killed by black bears in Japan between 1979 and 1989, and more recently, in September 2009, a black bear attacked a group of tourists, seriously injuring four, while they were waiting at a bus station in the built-up area of Takayama, Gifu Prefecture in central Japan. The majority of attacks tend to occur when black bears are encountered suddenly, and at close quarters. Because of this, black bears are generally considered more dangerous than sympatric brown bears, which live in more open spaces and are thus less likely to be surprised by approaching humans. They are also likely to attack when protecting food.

=== Brown bears ===
Illustration of a brown bear attacking Russian hunters

As a rule, brown bears seldom attack humans on sight, and usually avoid people. They are, however, unpredictable in temperament, and will attack if they are surprised or feel threatened. Sows with cubs account for the majority of injuries and fatalities in North America. Habituated or food-conditioned bears can also be dangerous, as their long-term exposure to humans causes them to lose their natural shyness, and in some cases associate humans with food. Small parties of one or two people are more often attacked than large groups. Only one attack, against a group of 20 elementary students and teachers in 2025, has been recorded against a party of more than seven people. In contrast to injuries caused by American black bears, which are usually minor, brown bear attacks tend to result in serious injury and in some cases death. In the majority of attacks resulting in injury, brown bears precede the attack with a growl or huffing sound, and seem to confront humans as they would when fighting other bears: they rise up on their hind legs, and attempt to "disarm" their victims by biting and holding on to the lower jaw to avoid being bitten in turn. Such a bite can be more severe than that of a tiger, and has been known to crush the heads of some human victims.

Most attacks occur in the months of July, August and September, the time when the number of outdoor recreationalists, such as hikers or hunters, is higher. People who assert their presence through noises tend to be less vulnerable, as they alert bears to their presence. In direct confrontations, people who run are statistically more likely to be attacked than those who stand their ground. Violent encounters with brown bears usually last only a few minutes, though they can be prolonged if the victims fight back.

Attacks on humans are considered extremely rare in the former Soviet Union, though exceptions exist in districts where they are not pursued by hunters. East Siberian brown bears for example tend to be much bolder toward humans than their shyer, more frequently hunted European counterparts. In 2008, a platinum mining compound in the remote Olyotorsky district of northern Kamchatka was besieged by a group of 30 Kamchatka brown bears that killed two guards and prevented workers from leaving their homes. In Scandinavia, only three fatal attacks were recorded in the 20th century. Due to increasing brown bear population in Turkey, attacks still occur in mountainous areas of Northeastern Turkey.

Native American tribes whose territories overlapped with those of grizzly bears often viewed them with a mixture of awe and fear. North American brown bears were so feared by the Natives that they were rarely hunted, especially alone. When Natives hunted grizzlies, the act was done with the same preparation and ceremoniality as intertribal warfare, and was never done except with a company of four to ten warriors. The tribe members who dealt the killing blow were highly esteemed among their compatriots. Californian Indians actively avoided prime bear habitat, and would not allow their young men to hunt alone, for fear of bear attacks. During the Spanish colonial period, some tribes, instead of hunting grizzlies themselves, would seek aid from European colonists to deal with problem bears. Many authors in the American west wrote of Natives or voyagers with lacerated faces and missing noses or eyes due to attacks from grizzlies. Within Yellowstone National Park, injuries caused by grizzly attacks in developed areas averaged approximately 1 per year during the 1930s through the 1950s, though it increased to 4 per year during the 1960s. They then decreased to 1 injury every 2 years (0.5/year) during the 1970s. Between 1980 and 2002, there were only 2 grizzly bear-caused human injuries in a developed area. However, although grizzly attacks were rare in the back-country before 1970, the number of attacks increased to an average of approximately 1 per year during the 1970s, 1980s, and 1990s.

According to bear biologist Charles Jonkel, one reason for bear attacks is the lack of important foods such as huckleberry, buffalo berry, and white-bark pine nut. Winter freezes may be one reason for the food shortages.

=== Polar bears ===
Polar bears, particularly starving males, will hunt humans for food. Attacks on humans by female bears are rare and have been primarily ascribed to the protection of cubs. The earliest recorded account of a polar bear attack was written in 1595. It described a predatory attack from Willem Barentsz's crew in the Russian Arctic, ending with the death of 2 crewmates.

Between 1870 and 2014, there have been 73 recorded polar bear attacks, causing 20 fatalities and 63 injured. These attacks occurred in the polar bear range states (United States, Russia, Norway, Canada, Greenland). Polar bears are often judged as the predators in these interactions as nearly all recorded attacks happened to groups of at least two people.

In one of these encounters, a polar bear killed one and injured four others on 5 August 2011 in the Norwegian archipelago of Svalbard when it attacked a party of secondary school students with the British Schools Exploring Society who were camped near the Von Post glacier, some 25 miles (40 km) from the settlement of Longyearbyen.

Rising temperatures cause polar bears to move inland; possibly impacting the rate of attacks.

=== Sloth bears ===
In some areas of India and Burma, sloth bears are more feared than tigers, due to their unpredictable temperament. In Madhya Pradesh, sloth bear attacks accounted for the deaths of 48 people and the injuring of 686 others between the years 1989 and 1994, probably due in part to the density of population and competition for food sources. One specimen, known as the sloth bear of Mysore, was single-handedly responsible for the deaths of 12 people and the mutilation of 2 dozen others before being shot by Kenneth Anderson. Sloth bears defend themselves when surprised, with the majority of confrontations occurring at night. They typically charge on all fours with their head held low, before rearing on their hind legs and striking at their attackers with their claws and teeth.

=== Other bears ===
Generally, giant pandas will not attack humans. They are known for their gentle, docile nature. Many recorded panda attacks are a result of humans falling or jumping into their zoo enclosure unexpectedly.

Spectacled bears rarely attack humans, though they may develop a taste for cattle on occasion.

== History of human–bear relationships ==
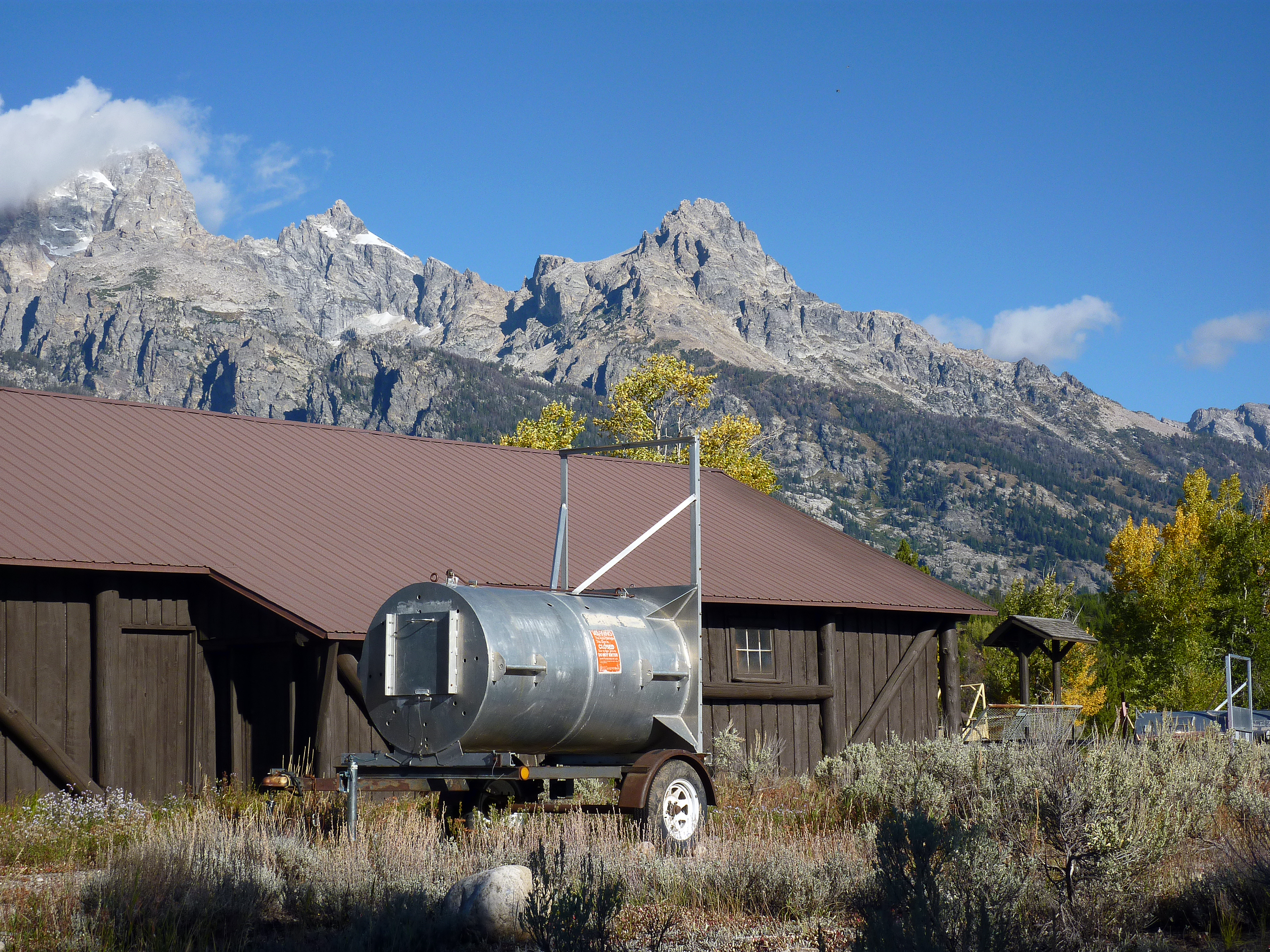
A drum or barrel trap used to safely relocate bears parked adjacent to a building in Grand Teton National Park in Wyoming, United States

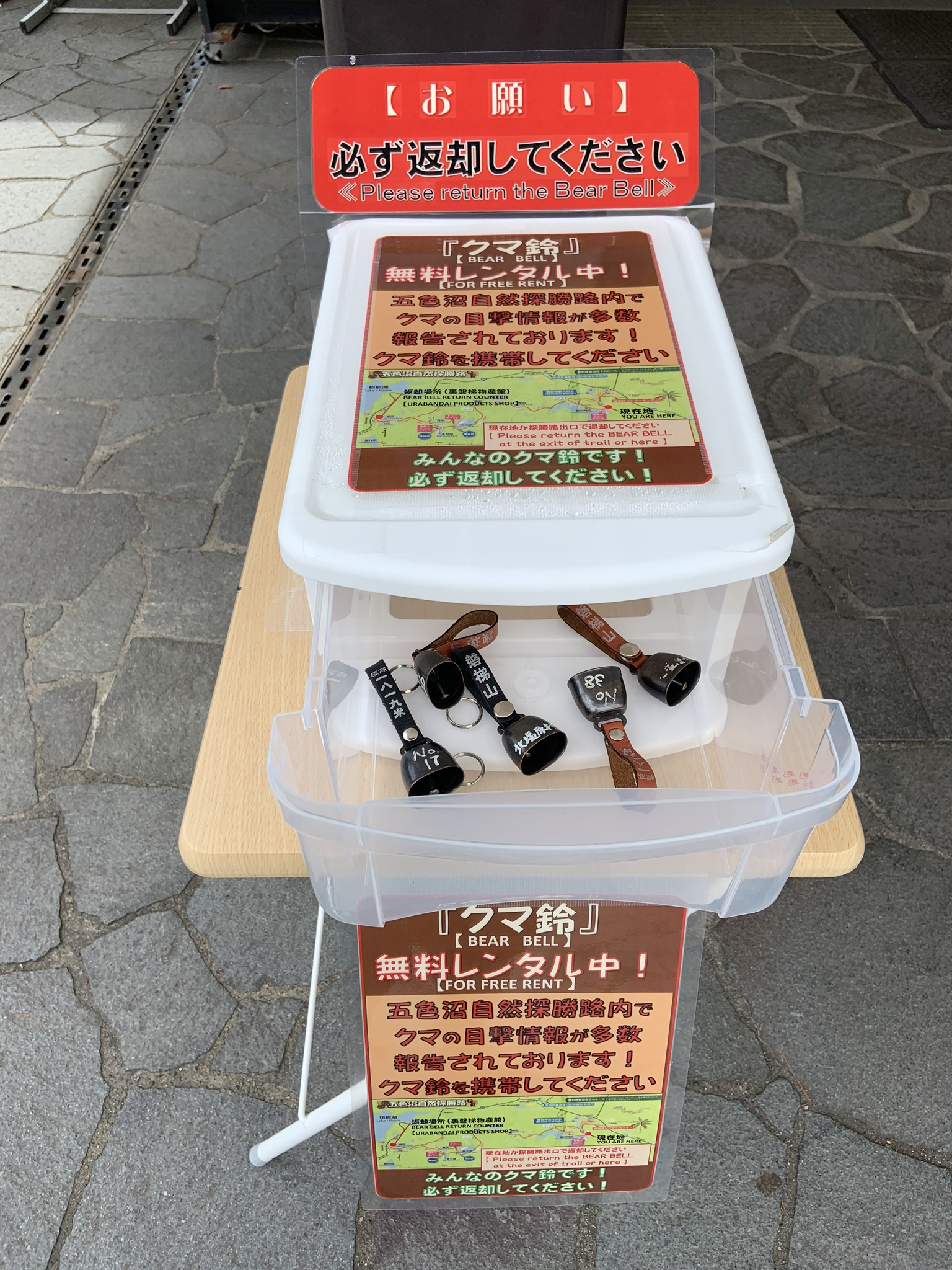
Bear bells for sightseers in Goshiki-numa, Japan

According to Wild Bears of the Worlds, by Paul Ward and Suzanne Kynaston, human contact with bears has existed since the time of the Neanderthals and the European cave bear around 200,000 to 75,000 years ago. There is some evidence of cave bear worship during these early years: between the years 1917 and 1922, Emil Bachler discovered a large stone chest filled with cave bear skulls in the Drachenloch Cave in Switzerland, one of the Wildkirchli; between 1916 and 1922, Konrad Hormann found narrow niches filled with five cave bear skulls.

Ward and Kynaston go on to report that Cro-Magnon humans, who first appeared nearly 35,000 years ago, show more obvious evidence of cave bear worship in the forms of paintings, sculptures, and engravings; however, there is still some doubt as to whether these works specifically depict the cave bear or the European brown bear.

In the 1900s, bear populations had been decreasing because of increased hunting of bears for sustenance (done mostly by native peoples such as the Inupiat of Alaska and the Inuvialuit of Canada) and for trophy prizes. Polar bear skins became popular as a sign of wealth and prestige, especially in Europe during the Victorian era. Comparatively, the pelts of giant pandas were also highly valued, priced at around 176,000 U.S. dollars. Settlers, indigenous, villagers and farmers defended their families and livestock by killing the local predators, including bears. This practice is still in place where necessary and legal.

More recently, laws have been instated to protect the dwindling populations of bears; however, as stated in Return of the Grizzly by David Whitman, these laws have increased the tensions between bears and humans. While this allows bear populations to recuperate, it also prevents people from killing bears that have invaded their property and killed their livestock.

In 2024, the "man or bear" meme sparked debate that women are more likely to face assault from men than bears.

== Physical characteristics ==
The various species of bear, belonging to the Ursidae family, are well-developed for survival, both for attaining food and defending against predators.

=== Fur ===
A bear's fur is often very thick, and it can function much like armor. In situations between bears and other predators, such as humans, this thick fur acts with the bear's thick skin and layers of fat as a buffer against most physical attacks, sometimes buffering to some extent even against firearms. According to Charles Fergus' Wild Guide: Bears, bear fur is also a source of insulation that allows bears to inhabit almost any habitat, from the hot jungles inhabited by sun bears and sloth bears to the frozen tundra inhabited by polar bears, thus occupying most of the same territory as humanity.

=== Muscle ===
A bear's muscular structure is highly suited for strength and power. Polar bears are known to swim for kilometers in search of food and to scoop 200 kg (440 lb) seals out of the water.

Grizzly bears can bring down prey, such as bison or moose, that outweigh the bear by several hundred kilograms and can steal kills from entire packs of wolves. Their top speed running on all fours has been reported to be around 60 km/h (40 mph). By comparison, Usain Bolt ran at a record-breaking speed of 43 km/h (27 mph) at the 2008 Summer Olympics. Most people are incapable of reaching speeds even remotely close to this number; thus, it is impossible for a human to outrun a bear, even one not running at its highest possible speed.

=== Claws ===
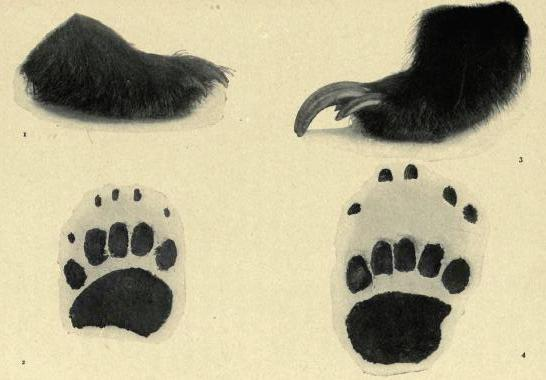
Claws and pawprints of an American black bear (left) and brown bear

Bears have five digits on each dextrous paw, each digit with a long non-retractable claw. The shape of the claw differs between the bear species: black bear claws are strong and curved, which allows them to claw at tree bark; grizzly bear claws are long and straight, ideal for digging, and can be up to 15 cm (6 in) long; polar bear claws are thick and sharp for holding the slippery skins of seals.

=== Jaws ===
The jaws of a bear reflect its omnivorous eating habits. A bear has forty-two teeth, with canines, which can be even longer than those of a tiger. While a bear's canines can pierce flesh and tear meat, a bear's back teeth are relatively flat, better suited for eating plants rather than meat. However, the jaws of bears are controlled by large muscles that are capable of crushing bones, which gives access to the nutritious marrow within. Some grizzly bears have jaws that can bite through 15-centimetre-thick (6 in) pine trees.

Humans in contrast have thirty-two teeth, sixteen on each jaw, each tooth less than a half-inch long. Of these teeth, there are four incisors, two canines, four premolars, and six molars. While human incisors are capable of biting into meat, bears have more powerful jaw muscles, which make their bite more destructive to flesh. More appropriate comparisons to bear dentition are to those of dogs whose teeth are similar in proportion to those of bears (and of course much smaller, although capable of inflicting much damage even at their smaller size).

=== Other senses and characteristics ===
Bears' senses are likely similar to those of dogs, animals that at times have much the same build and dietary habits of bears.

Bears' sense of smell is dependent on a Jacobson's organ, or vomeronasal organ, which allows the bear to easily detect airborne scents. Bears use this sense of smell not only to hunt, but to detect other bears as well; male bears use smell to stay away from other male bears and to find female bears during mating season. In contrast, humans are not considered to have a functional vomeronasal organ.

Little is known about a bear's hearing, but scientists concluded that it is at least as good as a human's. Some scientists believe that bears may even be able to detect ultrasonic sounds as well.

Natural observers believe that most bear species are near-sighted, which allows bears to forage for small objects such as berries. However, bears are also capable of discerning faraway movements, helping them hunt prey. The Kodiak bear, when compared to other species, appears to have vision comparable to a human (not near-sighted). Experiments show that black bears can see color, unlike many mammals. With scientists still working to determine exactly how perceptive bear eyes are, it is difficult to compare bear eyesight with human eyesight.

== Recovery from bear attacks ==
Aside from the large lacerations, fractures, and other wounds that can result from bear attacks, infections are also physically detrimental. A bear's mouth is full of potentially harmful bacteria, especially if the bear has been feeding on a gut pile or feces. Bear bites can result in infections common to most animal bites, including abscesses, sepsis, and even rabies. Though there is little data, what is available from bear bite statistics indicates that bears do not tend to carry many of the most well-known dangerous anaerobic bacteria strains in their normal oral flora; however, given the circumstances of most bear attacks, wound contamination from the environment is highly likely and means there is risk of tetanus and other external microbial agents.

Recovery from bear attacks depends on the extent of damage, but often involves long-term medical treatment. As shown in the medical procedure led by Professor Shuzhong Guo, extreme cases of bear attacks have resulted in plastic surgeries and even facial transplants that, while successful, may take several years to complete and are sometimes fatal.

== In captivity ==
Bear attacks have also happened in zoos and when bears are kept as pets.

- On August 11, 1953, 3-year-old Andrew Mark Palmer was mauled and killed while playing with his grandparents' pet bear.
- On March 31, 1969, 49-year-old Russell Ringer was crushed by his pet brown bear, which had no teeth or claws, as he entered its cage for a wrestling match at the military base.
- In April 1971, a 4-year-old boy fell into the brown bear enclosure at Tiergarten Odenkirchen and was mauled to death by three bears.
- On June 5, 1971, the 6-year-old polar bear Skandy was shot dead at Central Park Zoo after grabbing the arm of 29-year-old Oliver Jones and biting it off after he had jumped over a protective rail and put his hand between the bars. The victim was taken to a hospital. In the weeks after the incident, visitors placed many memorial tributes at the cage.
- On January 19, 1972, the body of 19-year-old Richard Hale was found at the bottom of the polar bear grotto at the Toledo Zoo. There was evidence that Hale was under the influence of drugs at the time of his attack.
- In 1974, a carnival bear mauled a 4-year-old child which could be saved by its owner.
- On August 12, 1975, while carnival workers were setting up, a bear was taken out of its cage and chained to a tree. 18-month-old Mary Ann Johns, whose parents were carnival workers, walked by and was attacked. The bear was the same animal from the 1974 incident.
- On August 26, 1976, 43-year-old Lafayette Herbert, who had a history of mental illness, was killed after he climbed into the polar bear enclosure at the Baltimore Zoo.
- On July 2, 1978, a bear trained to wrestle humans entered the home of its owner, professional wrestler Dave McKigney, and attacked and killed McKigney's friend, Orser, in her bedroom.
- In September 1982, 29-year-old Conrado Mones was killed by the 9-year-old polar bear Skandy after he climbed into its enclosure at Central Park Zoo.
- In May, 1987, two polar bears at Prospect Park Zoo killed and partially ate a 11-year-old boy after he climbed the enclosure's fence and swam through the moat to the middle of the compound. The two bears were subsequently shot by the police.
- On October 1, 1988, a 57-year-old zookeeper at Bremerhaven Zoo was attacked and killed by the 15-year-old male polar bear Herbert who probably entered an inside section of the enclosure through an unlocked door.
- On September 5, 2006, two polar bears at Bremerhaven Zoo attacked and severely injured a 25-year-old zookeeper. He was saved by his father, a zoo inspector, while the bears were distracted by food and shots of the police.
- On April 22, 2008, the 5-year-old trained grizzly bear Rocky killed its 39-year-old trainer Stephan Miller by biting his neck.
- On April 10, 2009, a woman jumped into the polar bear enclosure at Berlin Zoo during feeding time and was bitten in her back by one of the animals. She was taken to a nearby hospital.
- On April 19, 2009, the 25-year-old brown bear Nena escaped from a circus in Kassel, Germany and attacked a 38-year-old policeman who then shot her.
- On October 4, 2009, 37-year-old Kelly Ann Walz was killed by her pet black bear when cleaning its cage.
- In November 2009, a 25-year-old mentally handicapped man climbed into the Bärengraben in Bern. The 6-year-old bear Finn severely attacked him, biting his torso and shaking his body around for seven minutes, until the police shot and wounded the animal.
- On August 18, 2010, a girl climbed a 1-metre-tall fence and fell into the Asian black bear enclosure at Eifel-Zoo in Lünebach, Germany. There, she and her father, who tried to save her, were attacked. The two were later taken to a hospital.
- On August 19, 2010, 24-year-old caretaker Brent Kandra was killed by a bear kept as an exotic pet of Sam Mazzola when it was out of its cage for feeding.
- On January 5, 2011, a bear mauled and killed a 55-year-old worker in a zoo in Stavropol.
- In August 2017, a 19-year-old zookeeper at the now closed Orsa Rovdjurspark in Sweden was mauled to death by a 2-year-old brown bear who apparently dug its way back to the enclosure.
- In August 2017, a visitor of at the Badaling Wildlife World animal park near Beijing, China, was bitten in the shoulder by a bear after he had ignored park warnings and rolled down his car window.
- In November 2018, a brown bear at Tierpark Westerhausen in Thale, Germany, attacked and severely injured a zookeeper.
- In October 2019, the 16-year-old bear Yashka attacked its trainer Ruslan Solodyuk during a circus performance in the Russian town Olonets.
- In October 2020, a zoo worker was killed by bears in front of a visitor bus in Shanghai Zoo.
- In July 2021, a brown bear mauled its trainer twice during a performance of the Russian Harlequin Traveling Circus.
- On December 21, 2022, a 35-year-old zookeeper at Jacksonville Zoo and Gardens was mauled by the 5-year-old male American black bear Johnny that had breached its enclosure. Although the bear didn't have its canine teeth, she suffered lacerations to her to her back, thighs and head. The animal was shot dead.
- On December 6, 2025, an Asian black bear attacked an animal trainer at Hangzhou Safari Park shortly before the beginning of a show. Later, the trainer claimed that the bear was simply going for a bag of carrots.

== In fiction ==
Some natural horror films such as Grizzly (1976), Grizzly Rage (2007), Into the Grizzly Maze (2015) and Cocaine Bear (2023) feature man-eating bears.

The 2002 Western novel The Revenant, written by Michael Punke, and its 2015 film adaptation, are based on events in the life of trapper Hugh Glass, including his survival of a grizzly bear attack in 1823.

A grizzly bear attack is also featured in the 1981 Disney animated film The Fox and the Hound.

Mor'du from Pixar's Brave (2012) is a prince who was transformed into a demonic bear. At the beginning and in the climax of the film, he attacks Merida and her family.

The episode "Kill Team Kill" of Volume 3 of the adult animated series Love, Death & Robots features a cybernetically enhanced grizzly bear who attacks a team of US Army Green Berets.

== See also ==
- List of fatal bear attacks in North America
- Sankebetsu brown bear incident
- Bear danger
- Timothy Treadwell
- Binky (polar bear)
- List of large carnivores known to prey on humans

== Sources ==
- Anitei, Stefan (January 22, 2007). "The Limits of the Human Nose". softpedia.
- Batin, Christopher (2003). "Bear Attacks!". Outdoor Life. Vol. 210, no. 6. p. 46.
- Brandt, Anthony (1996). "Attack". Outdoor Life. Vol. 197, no. 1. p. 52.
- Cardall, Taylor Y.; Rosen, Peter (April 2003). "Grizzly bear attack". The Journal of Emergency Medicine. 24 (3): 331–333. doi:10.1016/s0736-4679(03)00004-0. PMID 12676309.
- "Death Statistics Comparison". UnitedJustice.com. 7 December 2008. 7 December 2008. Death Statistics
- Driscoll, Jamus (1996). "Bears on the Rampage". Outdoor Life. Vol. 197, no. 2. p. 20.
- Fergus, Charles (2005). Bears. Stackpole Books. ISBN 978-0-8117-3251-2.
- Guo, Shuzhong; Han, Yan; Zhang, Xudong; Lu, Binglun; Yi, Chenggang; Zhang, Hui; Ma, Xianjie; Wang, Datai; Yang, Li; Fan, Xing; Liu, Yunjing; Lu, Kaihua; Li, Huiyuan (August 2008). "Human facial allotransplantation: a 2-year follow-up study". The Lancet. 372 (9639): 631–638. doi:10.1016/S0140-6736(08)61276-3. PMID 18722867. S2CID 6469697.
- Masterson, Linda (2006). Living with Bears: A Practical Guide to Bear Country. PixyJack Press. ISBN 978-0-9773724-0-9.
- Simmons, Shraga. "Olympic Champions". aish.com 22 August 2004. 17 November 2008. Olympic Champions
- "Teeth". The Internet Encyclopedia of Science: Anatomy & Physiology. 17 November 2008. teeth
- Ward, Paul; Kynaston, Suzanne (1995). Wild Bears of the World [Facts On File]. Facts On File. ISBN 978-0-8160-3245-7.
- Whitman, David (September 2000). "The Return of the Grizzly". The Atlantic. Vol. 286, no. 3. pp. 26–31.
- Schmitt, Kristen A. (September 4, 2021). "5 Ways To Avoid a Grizzly Bear Attack and How To Survive One". Free Range American.
