= Subspecies of brown bear =

Brown bear subspecies

Formerly or currently considered subspecies or populations of brown bears (Ursus arctos) have been listed as follows:

== List ==
=== Eurasia and North Africa ===
Palearctic realm (Eurasia and North Africa)
Subspecies/population	Image	Distribution	Description/comments
Ursus arctos arctos – Eurasian brown bear or European brown bear		The most widespread subspecies in Europe, as well as their range in Western Russia and the Caucasus. May be found as far east in Russia as the Yenisei River in Yamalo-Nenets Autonomous Okrug to Novosibirsk Oblast in the south, where the subspecies intergrades into U. a. collaris.	A predominantly dark, richly brown colored (with rare light-colored individuals), moderately sized subspecies with dark claws, the Eurasian brown bears occurring in Russia are larger than their European counterparts, which may be in part because they are hunted less.
Ursus arctos beringianus – Kamchatkan brown bear or Far Eastern brown bear		the coastal lands surrounding the Sea of Okhotsk down as far as the Shantar Islands, Kolyma, all the land around the Shelikhov Gulf, the Kamchatka Peninsula and Paramushir Island	A very large bear with a broad muzzle. Overall has dark coloring, some animals appearing almost blackish-brown but will usually be paler at the top of the back. It may overlap with U. a. collaris extensively a few miles inland. It is thought to be the ancestor of the polar bear, the Kodiak bear, and the peninsular brown bears of Alaska. Middendorf described it from Greater Shantar Island with its distribution range comprising the eastern coast of Siberia and Japan.
Ursus arctos collaris – East Siberian brown bear		A majority of Siberia from the Yenisei River to as far south as the Altai Mountains in northern Mongolia, northernmost Xinjiang and northeastern Kazakhstan. Ranges as far north as the southwestern Taymyr Peninsula and the Anabar River. As the farthest east ranging of all Old World brown bear populations, it is found in Chukotka as far as the coast of the Bering Strait to the east and the coast of the Chukchi Sea in the north.	Most bears of this type are fairly dark, but some are as pale as grizzly bears. It is intermediate in size between U. a. arctos and U. a. beringianus, with a proportionately larger skull than the nominate subspecies. In the sub-Arctic region of Yakutia, bears are reportedly quite small compared to other regions.
Ursus arctos gobiensis – Gobi bear		the Gobi Desert, Mongolia	An extremely rare bear found in the Gobi Desert, this bear is adapted to desert life, dwelling in oases and rocky outcrops. It is rather small and pale and it appears to lack the whitish collar characteristic of Tibetan blue bears. Phylogenetic analysis suggests they represent a relict population of the Himalayan brown bear. At one time, Gobi bears probably overlapped and possibly interbred with Tibetan blue bears in western China, but the bears are now extinct in this area.
Ursus arctos isabellinus – Himalayan brown bear or red bear, isabelline bear		northern Nepal, North India and Northern Pakistan, most continuous current range in Jammu and Kashmir	Quite distinctive physically, as it possess a reddish-brown or sandy-brown coat color with silver-tipped hairs and relatively large ears. This bear is smaller than most other brown bears found on the Asian continent. Prefers high altitude forests and alpine meadows. Critically Endangered.
Ursus arctos lasiotus – Ussuri brown bear or Amur brown bear, Ezo brown bear, Manchurian grizzly bear, black grizzly bear		Russia: the southern Kuril Islands, Sakhalin, the Maritime Territory and the Ussuri/Amur River region south of the Stanovoy Range, China (in the former Manchuria): Heilongjiang, Japan: Hokkaidō, Honshu (in the last glacial period), and the Korean Peninsula: North Korea. Became extinct on Rebun and Rishiri Islands in the 13th century AD.	Ursus arctos lasiotus is quite variable in size. Skull dimensions from mainland Russia (i.e. the Primorsky and the Khabarovsk) indicate they can rival Kamchatkan brown bears in size. By contrast, the population found in Hokkaido is one of the smallest northern forms of the brown bear. Nonetheless, individuals from Hokkaido can reportedly get larger than expected and have reached 400 to 550 kg (880 to 1,210 lb). in weight by feeding on cultivations. This bear is thought to be the ancestor of U. a. horribilis. It is perhaps the darkest-colored population on average and some specimens are almost fully black in colour, although lighter brown and intermediate forms are known. Due to its coloring, this subspecies is sometimes informally referred to as the "black grizzly bear".
Ursus arctos marsicanus – Marsican brown bear or Apennine brown bear		Marsica, central Italy	There are an estimated 40 to 50 bears remaining in the Marsican area. This is an unrecognized subspecies that is now considered to be a population of the nominate subspecies U. a. arctos.
Ursus arctos pruinosus – Tibetan blue bear or horse bear		the Tibetan Plateau; some of the bears found in the Himalayas are reportedly actually wandering individuals from the more robustly populated Tibetan subspecies	This is a moderately-sized subspecies with long, shaggy fur. Both dark-colored and light-colored variants are encountered, with intermediate colors predominating. The fur around the neck, chest and shoulders is yellowish-brown or whitish and frequently forms a collar, which no other brown bear subspecies typically possesses in a mature state. Like the Himalayan brown bear, the ears are relatively prominent. The skull is distinguished by its relatively flattened choanae, an arch-like curve of the molar row and large teeth, probably in correlation to its particularly carnivorous habits.
Ursus arctos pyrenaicus – Cantabrian brown bear or Iberian brown bear		The Iberian Peninsula, primarily the Cantabrian Mountains and the hills in Galicia, and the Pyrenees. Rare, sporadic sightings in northern Portugal.	Until recently, this brown bear population was considered a separate subspecies. Today, it is considered to belong to the nominate subspecies U. a. arctos. Scientific evidence based on DNA studies would furthermore indicate the Eurasian brown bear can be divided into two distinct lineages. "There is a clear division into two main mitochondrial lineages in modern Eurasian brown bear populations. These populations are divided into those carrying an eastern lineage (clade IIIa, Leonard et al. 2000), which is composed of Russian, northern Scandinavian and eastern European populations, and those carrying a western lineage (clade I, Leonard et al. 2000), which is composed of two subgroups, one believed to originate from the Iberian Peninsula, including southern Scandinavian bears and the Pyrenean populations; and the other from the Italian–Balkan peninsulas (Taberlet et al. 1994; see however Kohn et al. 1995). In addition, based on the subfossil record in northwestern Moldova and mitochondrial DNA data from modern populations, a Carpathian refuge has also been proposed (Sommer & Benecke 2005; Saarma et al. 2007)." The Cantabrian brown bear is the largest wild animal on the Iberian Peninsula, although it is also one of the smallest of the brown bears, weighing between 92 and 180 kg (203 and 397 lb) as an adult. Its fur varies from pale cream to dark brown, but always with a distinctively darker, nearly black tone at the paws and a yellowish tinge at the tip of each hair. The Cantabrian brown bear population in Spain is considered endangered. The bear population in the Pyrenees stems mostly from bears reintroduced from Slovenia, with one or two remaining original males.
Ursus arctos syriacus – Syrian brown bear		Transcaucasia, Iraq, Turkey (Asia Minor), Iran, western Afghanistan, eastern Lebanon, Pakistan, western Himalayas and the Pamir-Alay and Tian Shan Mountains. Despite a historical presence in Israel and the Syrian Arab Republic (the latter is the subspecies' namesake), it is believed to be extinct in these countries now.	The Syrian brown bear is a moderate- to small-sized subspecies with light claws. This population tends to be a whitish-blond color, with less noticeable black-based hairs than grizzly bears have.
†Ursus arctos crowtheri – Atlas bear or North African brown bear, Crowther's bear (extinct)		The Atlas Mountains and adjacent areas in North Africa, from Morocco to Libya.	The Atlas bear was the only bear species to Africa in modern times. The last surviving Atlas bear is thought to have been killed by hunters in 1890.
†Ursus arctos priscus – Steppe brown bear (extinct)		Eurasia	The steppe brown bear was an extinct prehistoric brown bear subspecies that lived in places like Slovakia. It was more carnivorous than most bears today.

=== North America ===
Nearctic realm (North America)
Subspecies/population	Image	Distribution	Description/comments
Ursus arctos horribilis – Grizzly bear or North American brown bear		most of Alaska, the Yukon, the Northwest Territories, British Columbia, western Alberta, northern Idaho, western Montana, and northwestern Wyoming	The grizzly bear is identified by a medium to dark brown coat with gray or blond "grizzled" tips on the fur, which contrast with the black base. Highly variable in size, based largely on environmental conditions. It is also highly adaptable: it can live in montane pine forests, temperate rainforest, semi-arid scrubland, tundra and shortgrass prairie.
†Ursus arctos californicus – California grizzly bear or California golden bear (extinct)		California, mainly in the Sierra Nevada Mountains and some areas of coastal California	The last known California grizzly bear was shot in California in 1922. Museum specimens illustrate that this population was golden-blond overall, typically without the contrasting black fur base of true grizzly bears. It also appeared to have been considerably larger, with a broader muzzle than true grizzly bears.
Ursus arctos dalli – Dall Island brown bear		Dall Island, Alaska	Poorly described; possibly merely a coastal variation of other North American brown bears, but any such alliance is genetically ambiguous.
Ursus arctos gyas – Alaska Peninsula brown bear or peninsular giant bear		coastal Alaska from the Aleutian Islands as far west as Unimak, the Alaska Peninsula to the Kenai Peninsula	Considered by some biologists to be the same subspecies as U. a. middendorffi. Based on the known size of adult males, if it is a true subspecies, it may match or exceed the Kodiak bear in size.
Ursus arctos middendorffi – Kodiak bear		Kodiak, Afognak and Shuyak Islands (Alaska); arguably includes other coastal Alaskan forms which occur in most of the coasts of the western and southern parts of the state	This is the largest distinct subspecies of the brown bear, though the coastal-living members of other brown bear subspecies potentially rival it in size. It is medium-hued, typically not as dark as most forms from eastern Asia, but distinctly darker than grizzly bears.
Ursus arctos nelsoni – †Mexican grizzly bear, Mexican grey or silver bear; oso plateado in Spanish, pasini in Opata (extinct)		The smallest North American subspecies; formerly from northern Mexico, including Chihuahua, Coahuila and Sonora, and the southwestern United States, including the southern regions of Arizona, New Mexico and Texas	This bear is believed to have been hunted to extinction due to its interference with cattle ranching in both the United States and Mexico. Scarce by the 1930s, the last recorded sighting was in 1962. Distinct in its ability to survive arid conditions, it could live in both montane pine forests of Mexico and canyon lands adjacent to the Sonoran Desert. Because of its characteristic fur color, it was often referred to as silver bear or oso plateado in Spanish.
Ursus arctos sitkensis – ABC Islands bear or Sitka brown bear, Sitka bear		Admiralty Island, Baranof Island and Chichagof Island, the "ABC Islands" of Alaska	Appearing to be more closely related to the polar bear than to other brown bears, although it is on average the most dark-colored population in North America, with similar body size to grizzly bears from interior Alaska. This subspecies is called "clade II" by Waits and others and is part of the former subspecies identified as U. a. sitkensis by Hall and as U. a. dalli by Kurtén.
Ursus arctos stikeenensis – Stickeen brown bear or Stikine brown bear		northwestern British Columbia from the Stikine River to the Skeena River	Variously recognized as a distinct subspecies or as belonging to the subspecies U. a. horribilis. Larger than most other grizzly bear populations, with males approaching the great bears of coastal Alaska in size.

== Ecotypes or regional populations ==
Brown bear size, most often measured in body mass, is highly variable and is correlated to extent of food access. Therefore, bears whose range in areas with access to openings, cover, and moisture or water are on average larger, whereas those bears that range into enclosed forested areas or arid, sparsely vegetated regions, both of which tend to be suboptimal foraging habitat for brown bears, average smaller. The brown bear in northern Europe (i.e., Scandinavia, eastern Europe, western Russia), Yellowstone National Park or interior Alaska seasonally weigh on average between 115 and 360 kg (254 and 794 lb), from mean low adult female weights in spring to male bear mean high weights in fall. Brown bears from the Yukon Delta, interior British Columbia, Jasper National Park and southern Europe (i.e., Spain, the Balkans) can weigh from 55 to 175 kg (121 to 386 lb) on average. These mass variations represent only two widespread subspecies, the grizzly bear in North America and the Eurasian brown bear in Europe. Due to the lack of genetic variation within subspecies, the environmental conditions in a given area likely plays the largest part in such weight variations.

The grizzly is especially variable in size, as grizzlies from the largest populations, i.e., interior Alaska, with the heaviest weights recorded in Nelchina, Alaska, nearly three times heavier in males than the smallest grizzlies from Alberta, Canada's Jasper National Park. Between the sexes, the grizzlies of Nelchina average around 207 kg (456 lb), whereas the Jasper grizzlies averaged about 74 kg (163 lb). The enclosed taiga habitat of Jasper presumably is sub-optimal foraging habitat for grizzlies, requiring them to range widely and feed sparsely, thus reducing body weights and putting bears at risk of starvation, while in surfaces areas in the tundra and prairie are apparently ideal for feeding. Even elsewhere in Alberta, weights averaging more than twice those of Jasper grizzlies have been recorded. A gradual diminishment in body size is noted in grizzly bears from the sub-Arctic zone, from the Brooks Range to the Mackenzie Mountains, presumably because food becomes much sparser in such regions, although perhaps the most northerly recorded grizzly bears ever, in the Northwest Territories, was a large and healthy male weighing 320 kg (710 lb), more than twice as much as an average male weighs near the Arctic Circle. Data from Eurasia similarly indicates a diminished body mass in sub-Arctic brown bears, based on the weights of bears from northern Finland and Yakutia.

Head-and-body length in grizzly bears averages from 1.8 to 2.13 m (5 ft 11 in to 7 ft 0 in) while in Eurasian brown bears it similarly averages from 1.7 to 2.1 m (5 ft 7 in to 6 ft 11 in). Adult shoulder height averaged 95.2 cm (3 ft 1 in) in Yellowstone (for any bear measured five or more years old) and a median of 98.5 cm (3 ft 3 in) (for adults only 10 or more years old) in Slovakia. Standing on its hindlegs, a posture only assumed occasionally, typically sized brown bears can reportedly range from 1.83 to 2.75 m (6 ft 0 in to 9 ft 0 in) in standing height. Exceptionally large inland specimens have been reported in several parts of North America, Europe, Russia and even Hokkaido. The largest recorded grizzlies from Yellowstone and Washington both weighed approximately 500 kg (1,100 lb) and Eastern European bears have been weighed in Slovakia and Bulgaria of up to 400 kg (880 lb), about double the average weight for male bears in these regions. Among the grizzly and Eurasian brown bear subspecies, the largest reportedly shot from each being 680 kg (1,500 lb) and 481 kg (1,060 lb), respectively. The latter bear, from Western Russia, reportedly measured just under 2.5 m (8 ft 2 in) in head-and-body length.

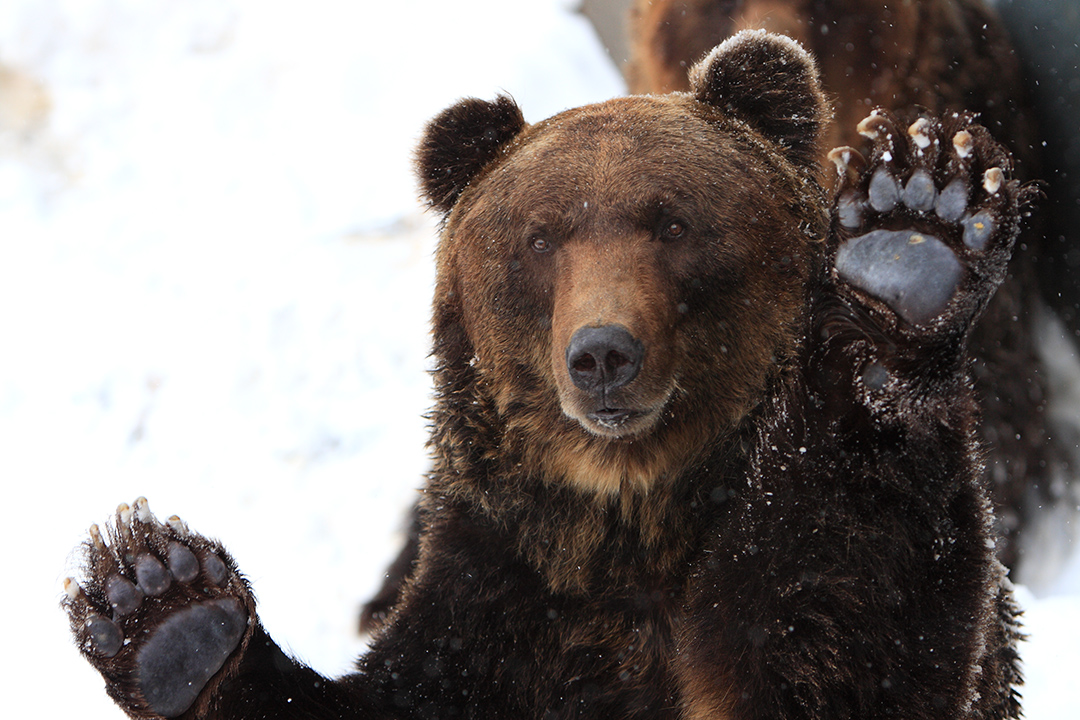
An Ussuri brown bear of Hokkaido, a relatively small-bodied population, in the snow

In Eurasia, the size of bears roughly increases from the west to the east, with the largest bears there native to Eastern Russia. Even in the nominate subspecies, size increases in the eastern limits, with mature male bears in Arkhangelsk Oblast and Bashkortostan commonly exceeding 300 kg (660 lb). Other bears of intermediate size may occur in inland populations of Russia. Much like the grizzly bear and Eurasian brown bear, populations of the Ussuri brown bear (U. a. lasiotus) and the East Siberian brown bear (U. a. collaris) may vary widely in size. In some cases, the big adult males of these populations may have matched the Kodiak bear in size. East Siberian brown bears from outside the sub-Arctic and mainland Ussuri brown bears average about the same size as the largest-bodied populations of grizzly bears, i.e., those of similar latitude in Alaska, and have been credited with weights ranging from 100 to 400 kg (220 to 880 lb) throughout the seasons. On the other hand, the Ussuri brown bears found in the insular population of Hokkaido are usually quite small, usually weighing less than 150 kg (330 lb), exactly half the weight reported for male Ussuri brown bears from Khabarovsk Krai. This is due presumably to the enclosed mixed forest habitat of Hokkaido. A similarly diminished size has been reported in East Siberian brown bears from Yakutia, as even adult males average around 145 kg (320 lb), thus about 40% less than the average weight of male bears of this subtype from central Siberia and the Chukchi Peninsula.

In linear measurements and mean body mass, several subspecies may vie for the title of smallest subtype, although thus far, their reported body masses broadly overlaps with those of the smaller-bodied populations of Eurasian brown bears and grizzly bears. Leopold (1959) described the now-extinct Mexican grizzly bear (U. a. nelsoni) that, according to Rausch (1963), as the smallest subtype of grizzly bear in North America, although the exact parameters of its body size are not known today. Bears of the Syrian subspecies (U. a. syriacus) will reportedly weigh around 100 to 160 kg (220 to 350 lb) in adulthood. The Himalayan brown bear (U. a. isabellinus) is another rival for the smallest subspecies; in Pakistan, this subtype averages about 70 kg (150 lb) in females and 135 kg (298 lb) in males. Himalayan brown bear females were cited with an average head-and-body length of merely 1.4 m (4 ft 7 in). Brown bears of the compact Gobi Desert population, which is not usually listed as a distinct subspecies in recent decades, weigh around 90 to 138 kg (198 to 304 lb) between the sexes, so they are similar in weight to bears from the Himalayas and even heavier than grizzlies from Jasper National Park. However, the Gobi bear has been reported to measure as small as 1 m (3 ft 3 in) in head-and-body length, which, if accurate, would make them the smallest known brown bear in linear dimensions. These smallest brown bear subtypes are characteristically found in "barren-ground" type habitats, i.e., sub-desert in bears of the Syrian subspecies and the Gobi subtype and arid alpine meadow in Himalayan brown bears.

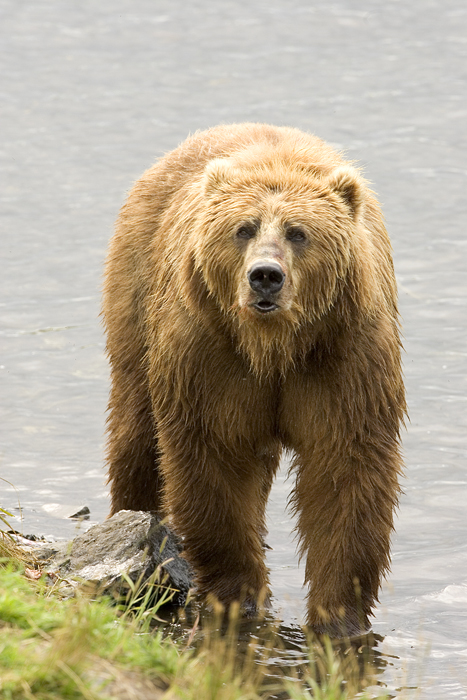
Considering pinnipeds and polar bears to be marine mammals, the Kodiak bear is the largest of the living land-based mammalian predators.

The largest subspecies are the Kodiak bear (U. a. middendorffi) and the questionably-distinct peninsular giant bear or coastal brown bear (U. a. gyas). Also, the extinct California grizzly bear (U. a. californicus) was rather large. Once mature, the typical female Kodiak bear can range in body mass from 120 to 318 kg (265 to 701 lb) and from sexual maturity onward, males range from 168 to 675 kg (370 to 1,488 lb). According to the Guinness Book of World Records the average male Kodiak bear is 2.44 m (8 ft 0 in) in total length (head-to-tail) and has a shoulder height of 1.33 m (4 ft 4 in). When averaged between their spring low and fall high weights from both localities, males from Kodiak island and coastal Alaska weighed from 312 to 389 kg (688 to 858 lb) with a mean body mass of 357 kg (787 lb) while the same figures in females were 202 to 256 kg (445 to 564 lb) with a mean body mass of 224 kg (494 lb). By the time they reach or exceed eight to nine years of age, male Kodiak bears tend to be much larger than newly mature six-year-old males, potentially tripling their average weight within three years' time, and can expect to average between 360 and 545 kg (794 and 1,202 lb). The reported mean adult body masses for both sexes of the polar bear are very similar to the peninsular giant and Kodiak bears. Due to their roughly corresponding body sizes, the two subtypes and the species can both legitimately be considered the largest living member of the bear family Ursidae and the largest extant terrestrial carnivores. The largest widely accepted size for a wild Kodiak bear, as well as for a brown bear, was for a bear killed in English Bay on Kodiak Island in fall 1894 as several measurements were made of this bear, including a body mass of 751 kg (1,656 lb), and a hind foot and a voucher skull were examined and verified by the Guinness Book of World Records. Claims have been made of larger brown bears, but these appear to be poorly documented and unverified and some, even if recited by reputable authors, may be dubious hunters' claims.

The largest variety of brown bear from Eurasia is the Kamchatkan brown bear (U. a. beringianus). In the Kamchatkan brown bears from past decades, old males have been known to reach a body mass of 500–685 kg (1,102–1,510 lb) by fall, putting the subtype well within Kodiak bear sizes and leading it to be considered the largest of the extant Russian subtypes. However, a diminishment in body size of U. a. berigianus has been noted, mostly likely in correlation with overhunting. In the 1960s and 1970s, most adult Kamchatkan brown bears weighed merely between 150 and 285 kg (331 and 628 lb); however, mean weights of mature male bears have been reported as averaging 350 to 450 kg (770 to 990 lb) in 2005.
