= 2011 Svalbard polar bear attack =

Bear attack in Svalbard, Norway

A map with Svalbard highlighted green

The 2011 Svalbard polar bear attack was an attack by polar bear on a group of secondary school students and their guides in Norway. The bear killed one person, injured four others, and was then shot.

== Event ==
On 5 August 2011, a polar bear in the Norwegian archipelago of Svalbard attacked a party of 13 students, who were undertaking an expedition organised by the British Schools Exploring Society (BSES), and were camped near the Von Post glacier, 40 kilometres (25 miles) from the settlement of Longyearbyen. The bear was reported as being starving and emaciated. 17-year-old Horatio Chapple, a pupil of Eton College and grandson of former governor of Gibraltar Sir John Chapple, was killed in the attack. Four others were hurt, three seriously, and all were flown to Tromsø on mainland Norway for treatment. The bear was shot dead by one of the expedition's leaders, Michael "Spike" Reid, who himself suffered severe head and facial injuries.

The BSES party of 80 members had planned their trip to run from 23 July to 28 August, but it was cut short after the incident.

== Aftermath ==
Police later disclosed that the organisers of the expedition had not assigned a night watchman, because of dense fog on the night of the incident, and that during the emergency their gun failed to fire four times because its safety catch was engaged. Leaders of such expeditions are advised that camps should be protected by trip wires that detonate deterrent explosives, lookouts through the night, or guard dogs. Of those options, the camp used trip wires, but they failed to trigger.

The Sysselmann (local authority) requires a risk assessment for any camping trip such as this, which must then be approved by the Sysselmann.

In September 2011, it was announced that a high court judge would chair an inquiry into the death.

In March 2012, following an inquiry by Norwegian investigators, officials ruled that the attack could have been prevented if the expedition members had stayed in cabins instead of tents. However, since this additional safety precaution was not required by law, it was ruled that the expedition leaders would not face prosecution.

Chapple's parents launched a charity initiative, Horatio's Garden, in his memory. The charity has built six gardens in spinal injury centres across the United Kingdom, with more in development.

== See also ==
- Bear attack
