= Dvuhyurtochnoe Lake =

- Location within Russia
- Location: Ust-Kamchatka, Ust-Kamchatsky District, Russia
- Coordinates: 56.814°N 160.052°E
- Type: lake
- Max. length: 6.3 kilometres (3.9 mi)
- Max. width: 2 kilometres (1.2 mi)
- Surface area: 11.9 square kilometres (4.6 sq mi)

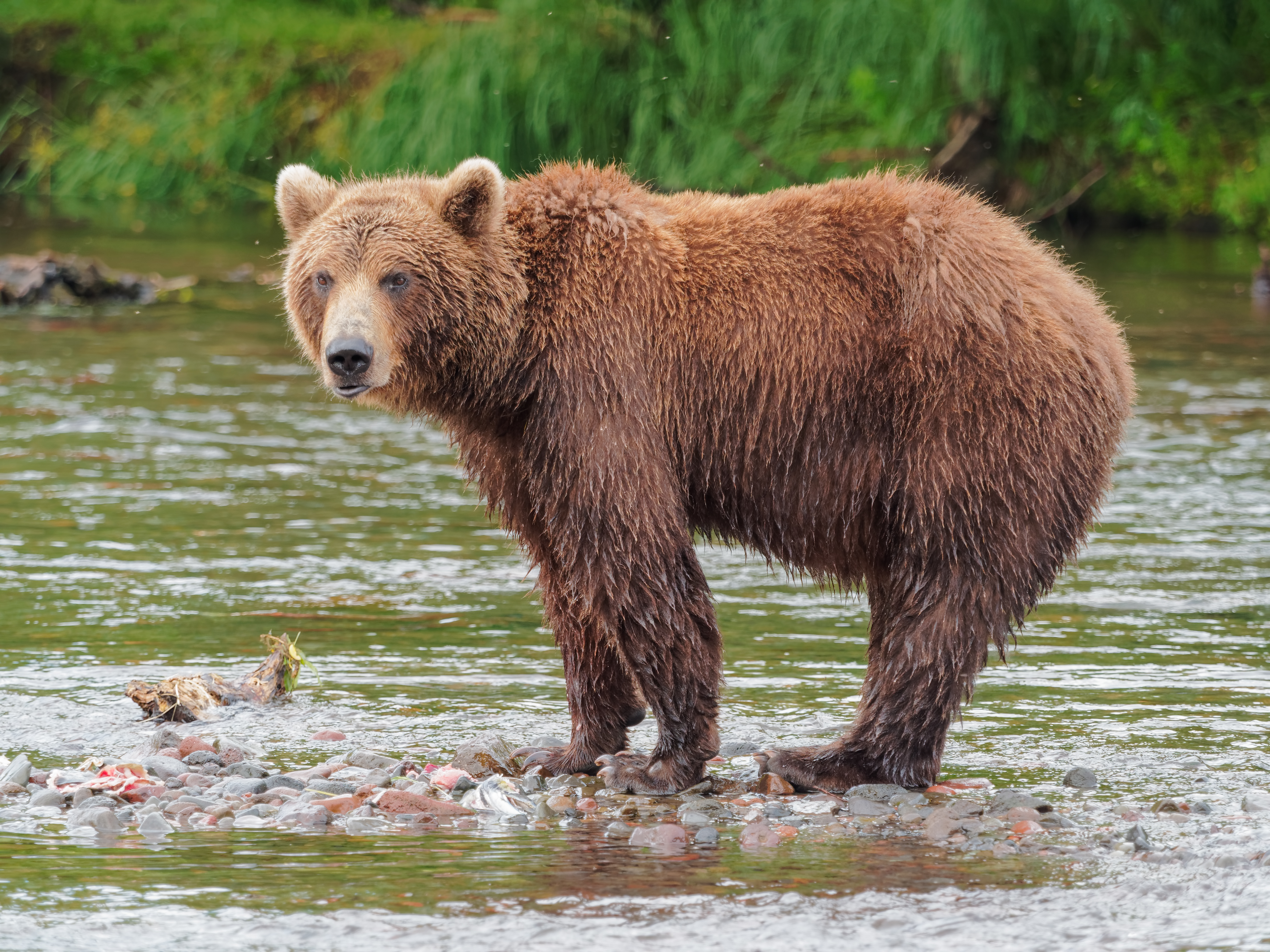
Robert F. Tobler, a Kamchatka brown bear near Dvuhyurtochnoe, taken on July 23rd, 2015

Dvuhyurtochnoe Lake (Russian: о́зеро Двухюрточное) is a freshwater lake in the Ust-Kamchatka region of the Kamchatka Territory, Russia. Its area is 11.9 square kilometres (4.6 sq mi), its length is 6.3 kilometres (3.9 mi), and its maximum width is 2 kilometres (1.2 mi). The lake has a glacial-barren origin. It resulted from the lowering of a small section of the river valley.

The lake is in the eastern spurs of the Median ridge, east of the Gora Alney volcano, at an altitude of 266 metres (873 ft) above sea level. The lake is a widening of the Dvukhyurtochnaya River, which flows through it from west to east. To the north of the confluence of the Dvukhyurtochnaya River, two thermal springs flow into it. This lake is one of the spawning reservoirs of the peninsula. Above the northern shore of the lake stands the 1,081-metre (3,547 ft) Olney Volcano.
