= Stephen Herrero =

Canadian bear expert

- Born: San Francisco, California, U.S.
- Education: University of California, Berkeley
- Known for: Research on bear behaviour
- Scientific career
- Fields: Animal science
- Workplaces: University of Calgary

Stephen Herrero is a Canadian professor emeritus of ecology at the University of Calgary. He is the author of Bear Attacks: Their Causes and Avoidance, which has been described as "authoritative" and "required reading" on the topic.

Herrero was born in San Francisco, and earned his Ph.D. from University of California, Berkeley, in animal behaviour and ecology. He moved to Canada after becoming disillusioned with overdevelopment in the U.S., and the Vietnam War.

As a professor at the University of Calgary, Herrero's research on bear attacks has been highly influential; it helped develop new policies in bear safety and shifted focus to bear conservation. He is described as a leading authority on bear attacks and safety, produces bear safety videos, and testifies in legal proceedings involving bear attacks.

He was a consultant on the 1978 National Film Board documentary, Bears and Man.

In 2011, he conducted educational seminars about bears at national parks such as Grand Teton National Park in Wyoming.

== See also ==
- Bear attack
- List of fatal bear attacks in North America
