= John Chapple (British Army officer) =

British Army officer (1931–2022)

Field Marshal Sir John Chapple GCB CBE OStJ
- Born: 27 May 1931; Maida Vale, London, England
- Died: 25 March 2022 (aged 90); Salisbury, Wiltshire, England
- Military career
- Allegiance: United Kingdom
- Branch: British Army
- Service years: 1950–1992
- Rank: Field Marshal
- Service number: 410821
- Units: Royal Artillery; King's Regiment (Liverpool); South Lancashire Regiment; 2nd King Edward VII's Own Gurkha Rifles (The Sirmoor Rifles)
- Commands: Chief of the General Staff; Land Forces; Commander British Forces in Hong Kong; Gurkha Field Force; 1st Battalion, 2nd Gurkha Rifles
- Conflicts: Malayan Emergency; Indonesia–Malaysia confrontation
- Awards: Knight Grand Cross of the Order of the Bath; Commander of the Order of the British Empire
- Other work: Governor of Gibraltar (1993–1995)

Viceregal styles of Sir John Chapple (1993–1995)
- Reference style: His Excellency
- Spoken style: Your Excellency

Field Marshal Sir John Lyon Chapple, GCB, CBE, OStJ (27 May 1931 – 25 March 2022) was a British Army officer who served as Chief of the General Staff (CGS), the professional head of the British Army, from 1988 to 1992. Early in his military career he saw action during the Malayan Emergency and again during the Indonesia–Malaysia confrontation and later in his career he provided advice to the British government during the Gulf War.

== Early life ==
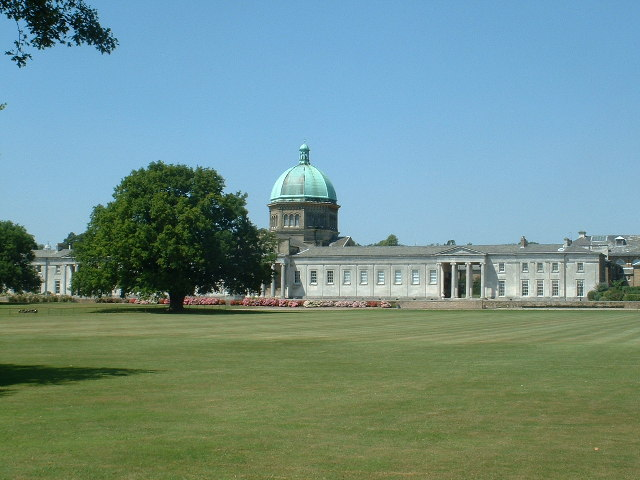
Haileybury College where Chapple was educated

Chapple was born in Maida Vale, London, to Charles Chapple and Elsie Lyon. Elsie was a doctor; Charles served in the army during the First World War, first on the Western Front in France and later in Mesopotamia (modern-day Iraq).

Chapple attended Haileybury College, his time there coinciding with the Second World War; on one occasion a German V-1 flying bomb landed near the school, damaging the buildings. At school, he discovered a passion for drama and took part in five expeditions with the British Exploring Society.

== Early military career ==
Chapple undertook National Service and was commissioned as a second lieutenant in the Royal Artillery on 3 June 1950. He went to Trinity College, Cambridge, in October 1951, studying German and history. While still at University, he transferred to the King's Regiment (Liverpool) as a second lieutenant on 4 December 1952, and to the South Lancashire Regiment also in the same rank on 20 October 1953. He became a lieutenant in the South Lancashire Regiment on 27 May 1954 and, on leaving University, transferred to the 2nd King Edward VII's Own Gurkha Rifles (The Sirmoor Rifles) on 3 August 1954, retaining his rank as a lieutenant.

At the time Chapple joined the Gurkhas, they were engaged in fighting in Malaya during the Malayan Emergency, against communist guerrillas attempting to overthrow British colonial rule. Chapple spent three years with the regiment in intense jungle combat in southern Johor. He was promoted to captain on 9 February 1957. In 1962, he was sent to the army's Staff College, Camberley, in Surrey in preparation for higher rank, and then promoted major on 9 February 1964. He was sent to Germany to take up an administrative position in the British Army of the Rhine before re-joining the Gurkhas, this time in Borneo, again involved in jungle warfare, this time against Indonesia as part of the Indonesian Confrontation. Appointed a Member of the Order of the British Empire in the Queen's Birthday Honours 1969 and promoted to lieutenant colonel on 31 December, he was appointed commanding officer of the 1st Battalion, 2nd Gurkha Rifles in 1970. He commanded the battalion in Singapore, and then in Hong Kong, both British colonies at the time. The troops were stationed near the border between Hong Kong and China due to tensions between the new communist regime and the west.

Chapple was appointed to the Directing Staff at the Staff College, Camberley in 1972. After spending much of the year as a services fellow at Fitzwilliam College, Cambridge in 1973, he was posted to the Directorate of Staff Duties at the Ministry of Defence (MoD) at the end of the year, with promotion to colonel on 31 December 1973. During his tenure at the MoD, the army was faced with issues in Northern Ireland, the Turkish invasion of Cyprus (1974), while the newly installed Labour government sought to make defence cutbacks east of Suez. He was promoted to brigadier on 31 December 1975, and given command of the Gurkha Field Force, stationed in Hong Kong, in 1976. He became Principal Staff Officer to the Chief of the Defence Staff in 1978, serving first Marshal of the Royal Air Force Sir Neil Cameron and later Admiral of the Fleet Sir Terence Lewin.

== High command ==
He was appointed a Commander of the Order of the British Empire in the 1980 Queen's Birthday Honours, and returned once more to Hong Kong as Commander British Forces on 13 June 1980, with the substantive rank of major general from 1 January 1981. He returned to the United Kingdom to be Director of Military Operations at the MoD on 19 October 1982. Northern Ireland was again high on the army's agenda, and Chapple was among those advocating for prisoner of war status for Provisional Irish Republican Army prisoners, to allow their detention indefinitely. During his tenure, Margaret Thatcher's government embarked on a programme of centralisation of the armed forces and Chapple represented the army on the committee overseeing it. The committee eliminated the position of Vice Chief of the General Staff, the deputy head of the army and the position which would have been Chapple's next post.

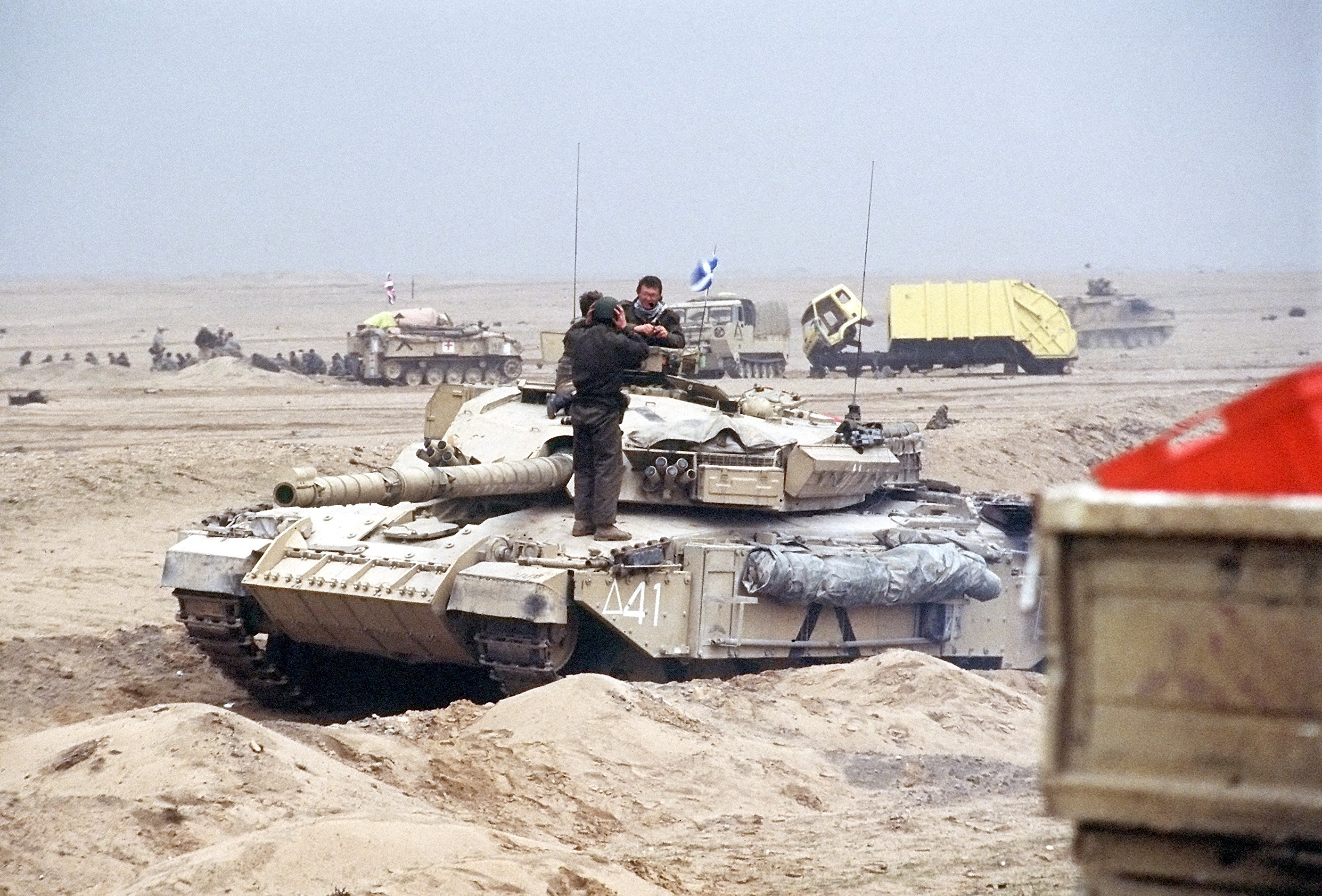
Chapple advised the British Government during the Gulf War

Appointed a Knight Commander of the Order of the Bath in the 1985 Queen's Birthday Honours, Chapple became the inaugural Deputy Chief of the Defence Staff (Programmes and Personnel) on 2 January 1985 in the rank of lieutenant general. The post was a centralised one, with responsibilities to all three services, and resulted from the reforms Chapple had been part of in his previous position. He was promoted to the rank of general on 29 June 1987, and appointed Commander-in-Chief, United Kingdom Land Forces. He was appointed Aide-de-Camp General to the Queen on 6 October 1987 and advanced to a Knight Grand Cross of the Order of the Bath (GCB) in the 1988 Birthday Honours. After a relatively brief tour as commander-in-chief, his last appointment was as Chief of the General Staff (the professional head of the army) from 10 September 1988. Chapple was in-post for the implementation of the Options for Change reforms brought in with the end of the Cold War served in this post, in which he provided military advice to the British Government on the conduct of the Gulf War, until he retired with promotion to field marshal on 13 February 1992. Although widely expected to be the next Chief of the Defence Staff (professional head of all the armed forces), the post instead went to Sir Peter Harding of the Royal Air Force.

Chapple was appointed Colonel of the 2nd King Edward VII's Own Gurkha Rifles (The Sirmoor Rifles) on 14 September 1986, and Honorary Colonel of the Oxford University Officers Training Corps on 21 July 1987.

== Later career ==
Chapple was also a trustee of the Gurkha Museum from 1973 to 2003, a trustee of the National Army Museum from 1981 to 2003, a trustee of the World Wildlife Fund UK from 1988 to 1993, President of the Zoological Society of London from 1992 to 1994 and Governor of Gibraltar from 1993 to 1995.

== Personal life and death ==
In 1959 Chapple married Annabel Hill, whom he met through a university friend; they have one son and three daughters. Their daughter, Rachel Lucy Chapple, is a social anthropologist. Their son, David Chapple, is a consultant orthopaedic and spinal surgeon. On 5 August 2011, Chapple's 17-year-old grandson, Horatio Chapple, was killed by a polar bear while on an expedition in the Norwegian archipelago of Svalbard. Four other members of the cohort were injured in the attack.

Chapple's interests included military history.

Chapple died on 25 March 2022, aged 90, at his home in Salisbury after a short illness.

== See also ==
- Indian Military Historical Society

Military offices
Preceded by Sir Roy Redgrave	Commander of British Forces in Hong Kong; 1980–1982	Succeeded by Sir Derek Boorman
New title	Deputy Chief of the Defence Staff (Programmes and Personnel); 1984–1987	Succeeded by Sir David Parry-Evans
Preceded by Sir James Glover	Commander in Chief, UK Land Forces; 1987–1988	Succeeded by Sir Charles Huxtable
Preceded by Sir Nigel Bagnall	Chief of the General Staff; 1988–1992	Succeeded by Sir Peter Inge
Government offices
Preceded by Sir Derek Reffell	Governor of Gibraltar; 1993–1995	Succeeded by Sir Hugo White
