= British Exploring Society =

Youth wilderness exploration organization based in the UK

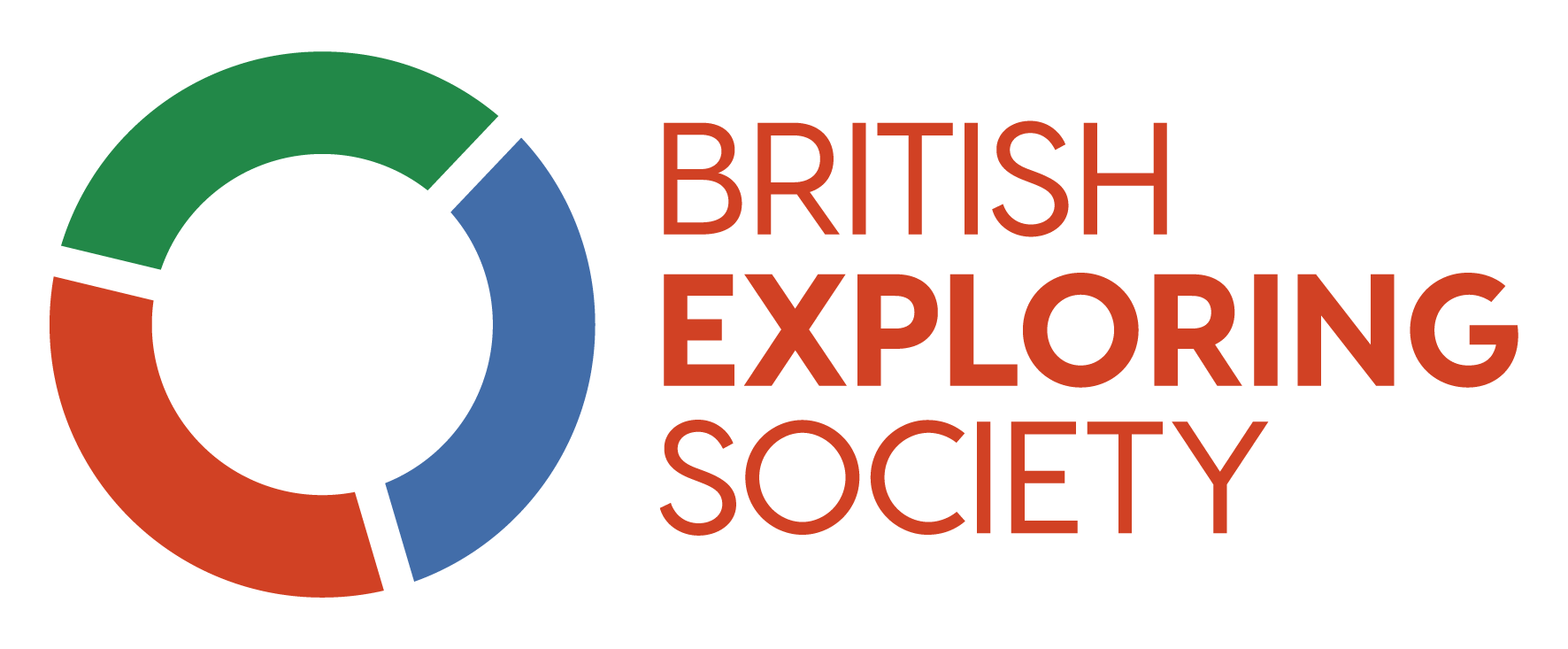
- Founded: 1932
- Founder: Surgeon Commander George Murray Levick RN
- Type: Charity
- Registration no.: 802196 (England and Wales)
- Purpose: Youth development
- Location(s): 1 Kensington Gore; London SW7 2AR; United Kingdom
- Key people: Honor Wilson-Fletcher (CEO); The Duke of Edinburgh (patron)
- Website: www.britishexploring.org
- Formerly called: Public Schools Exploring Society; British Schools Exploring Society; BSES Expeditions

The British Exploring Society is a UK-based youth development charity based at the Royal Geographical Society building, aiming to provide young people with an intense and lasting experience of self-discovery in wilderness environments.

== History ==
The society began as the "Public Schools Exploring Society" in 1932 by Surgeon Commander George Murray Levick ,,RN, who had been a member of Captain Scott's final Antarctic Expedition of 1910–13. It was later renamed the "British Schools Exploring Society", then became BSES Expeditions, before adopting its current name in 2012.

For 90 years, British Exploring Society has provided the opportunity for young people, aged 16–25 years old, from different schools, universities and many other walks of life to take part in adventure and environmental research projects in challenging areas of the world, from the Arctic to the Amazon Rainforest. Led by unpaid professionals drawn from the outdoors, youth work, teaching and the Services, all the expeditions aim to help in the development of young people through the challenge of living and working in remote and testing areas of the world.

=== Norwegian polar bear attack ===
In August 2011, a party of teenagers in Norway was attacked at night by a polar bear leading to the death of a seventeen-year-old boy and injuries to several others. Both the Norwegian authorities and a private enquiry commissioned by BSES and chaired by a UK high court judge criticized the expedition's defective gun, and inadequate warning arrangements, the judge ruling that the accident was preventable. However, in July 2014, a coroner cleared the BSES of neglect as failure "was not total or complete."

== Membership ==
British Exploring is a registered charity. Young people aged 16–25 are invited to take part in an expedition. When a young person successfully completes a British Exploring Society expedition they are offered membership for life. Historically, all members had voting rights, but the Articles of the charity were changed in 2019 and now only Governance Members - principally trustees, have voting rights.

== Expedition locations ==
British Exploring Society is most well known historically for its expeditions to the Arctic, but has also mounted expeditions to the Amazon rainforest, India, Kenya and Papua New Guinea among many others and now works in the UK, mainly the Highlands of Scotland.

== Funding and charity work ==
Since 2020 no young person now pays to participate on an expedition with British Exploring Society. Each is asked to take on a personal fund-raising target based on a fair means test to support the work of the charity. The charity works with a wide range of other organisations, for example Catch 22 to enable disadvantaged and excluded young people to undertake its expeditions. It claims that over 90% of them progress to training, education or employment afterwards.

== Science projects ==
Early expeditions collected valuable fieldwork data and brought back specimens for the Natural History Museum and the British Museum. Currently British Exploring collaborates with a range of scientific research institutions from universities and world-respected scientists and in-country NGOs and conservation organisations.

The expeditions contribute to long-term research projects by:

- Helping to gather objective scientific data
- Involvement in local community conservation and education initiatives

Many of the Society's full members, who qualify as such by successfully completing a British Exploring expedition, have gone on to play a leading role in major international adventurous and scientific projects.

== Notable members ==
The society has a strong record of developing young people, and its alumni include:

- David Rhind, Vice-Chancellor of City University, London, began his early surveying with British Exploring as a Young Explorer in a 1962 expedition to Swedish Lapland. Prof Rhind was previously Director General and Chief Executive of The Ordnance Survey of Great Britain (1992–98).
- Field Marshal Sir John Chapple went on an expedition in the 1950s and went on to become the Chief of the General Staff, the professional head of the British Army, between 1989 and 1992. He also served as Governor of Gibraltar from 1993 to 1995 - and then British Exploring president. It was his grandson, Horatio Chapple, who was killed in the Svalbard polar bear attack.
- Colin Tongs was a member of the 1954 Expedition to Northern Quebec. Royal Signals Radio Officer, he Became an adviser to the Reagan Administration in 1987.
- Roald Dahl, author, joined a British Exploring expedition to Newfoundland at eighteen, instead of entering university.
- Admiral of the Fleet Lord Lewin went to Newfoundland with British Exploring in 1938 as one of the first young explorers from a state school.
- Tori James was a Young Explorer on a British Exploring expedition in 2000 to the Vatnajökull Glacier in Iceland. She went on to work in the British Exploring office for 3 years. In 2005, she joined the Pink Lady PoleCats team and became the youngest ever female to complete The Scott Dunn Polar Challenge, a gruelling 360-mile race to the Magnetic North Pole. On 2 October 2005 James became the "highest Welsh woman ever" having summited the world's sixth highest mountain, Cho Oyu (8,201m). James became the youngest British female and first Welsh woman to climb Everest when she summited in May 2007.
