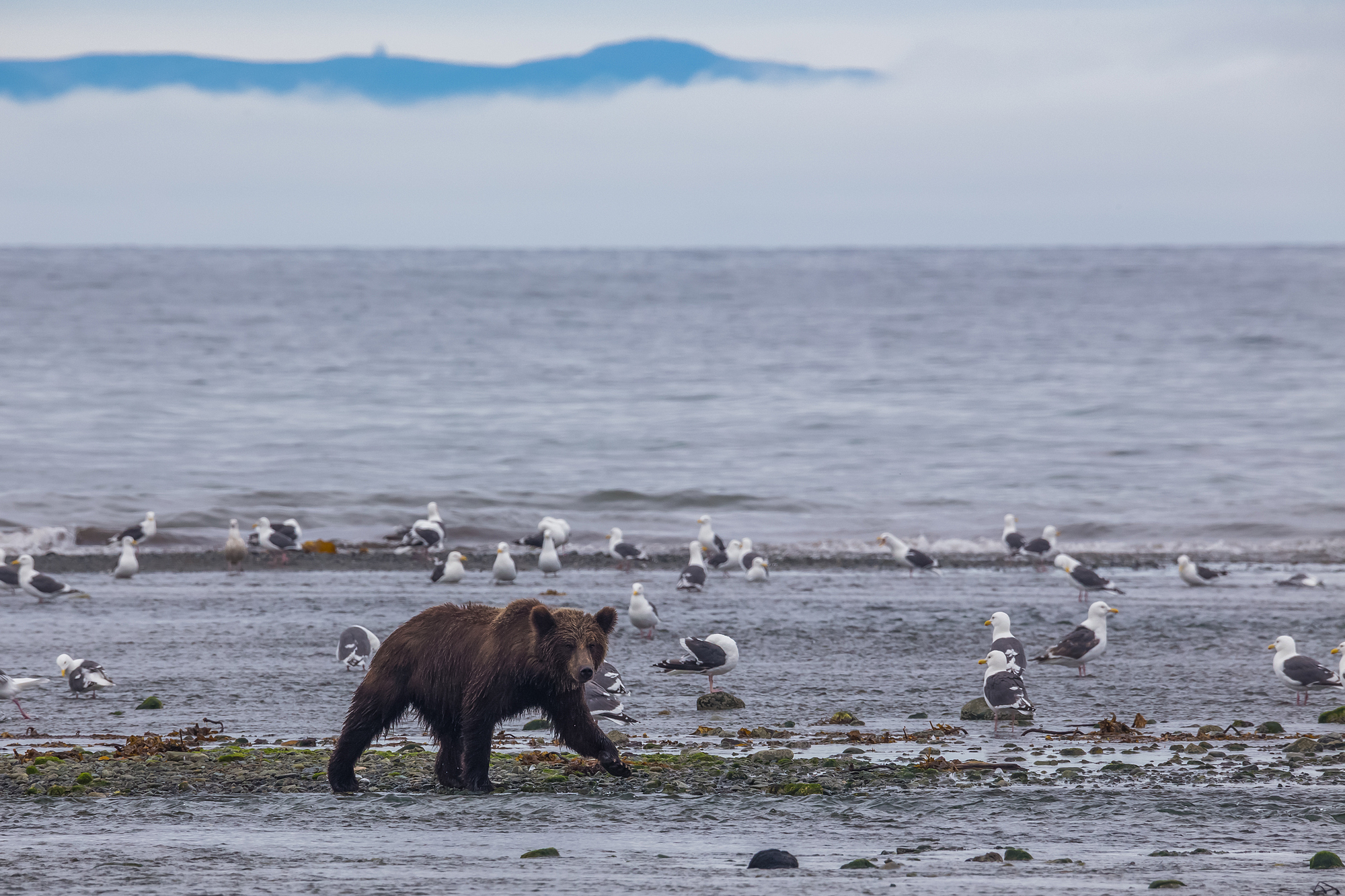
- Brown bear with slaty-backed gulls at Magadan Nature Reserve, Russia

Conservation status
- Vulnerable (IUCN 3.1) (Altai Mountains and Kazakhstan)

Scientific classification
- Kingdom: Animalia
- Phylum: Chordata
- Class: Mammalia
- Order: Carnivora
- Family: Ursidae
- Genus: Ursus
- Species: U. arctos
- Subspecies: U. a. collaris

Trinomial name
- Ursus arctos collaris F. G. Cuvier, 1824

Synonyms
- jeniseensis Ognev, 1924 sibiricus J. E. Gray, 1864

= East Siberian brown bear =

Subspecies of carnivore

The East Siberian brown bear (Ursus arctos collaris) is a population or subspecies of brown bear which ranges from eastern Siberia, beginning at the Yenisei river, north to the Arctic Circle, as far as Trans-Baikaliya, the Stanovoy Range, the Lena River, Kolyma and generally throughout Yakutia and the Altai Mountains. The subspecies is also present in northern Mongolia, northern Xinjiang, and eastern Kazakhstan.

== Size ==
East Siberian bears are intermediate in size to Eurasian brown bears and Kamchatka brown bears, though large individuals can attain the size of the latter. Their skulls are invariably larger than those of Eurasian brown bears and are apparently larger than those of Kamchatka brown bears.

Adult males have skulls measuring 32.6–43.1 cm (12.8–17.0 in) in length, and 31.2–38.5 cm (12.3–15.2 in) wide at the zygomatic arches. They have long, dense and soft fur which is similar in colour to that of Eurasian brown bears, though darker coloured individuals predominate.

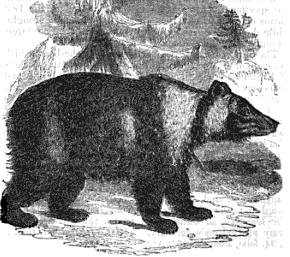
A sketch of an East Siberian brown bear

== Taxonomic history ==
Originally, Cuvier's trinomial definition for this subspecies was limited to brown bear populations in the upper Yenisei river, in response to bears there sporting well-developed white collars. The subspecies has since been reclassified as encompassing populations formerly classed as jeniseensis and sibiricus, though the latter two lack the collar.

== Behaviour, diet and ecology ==
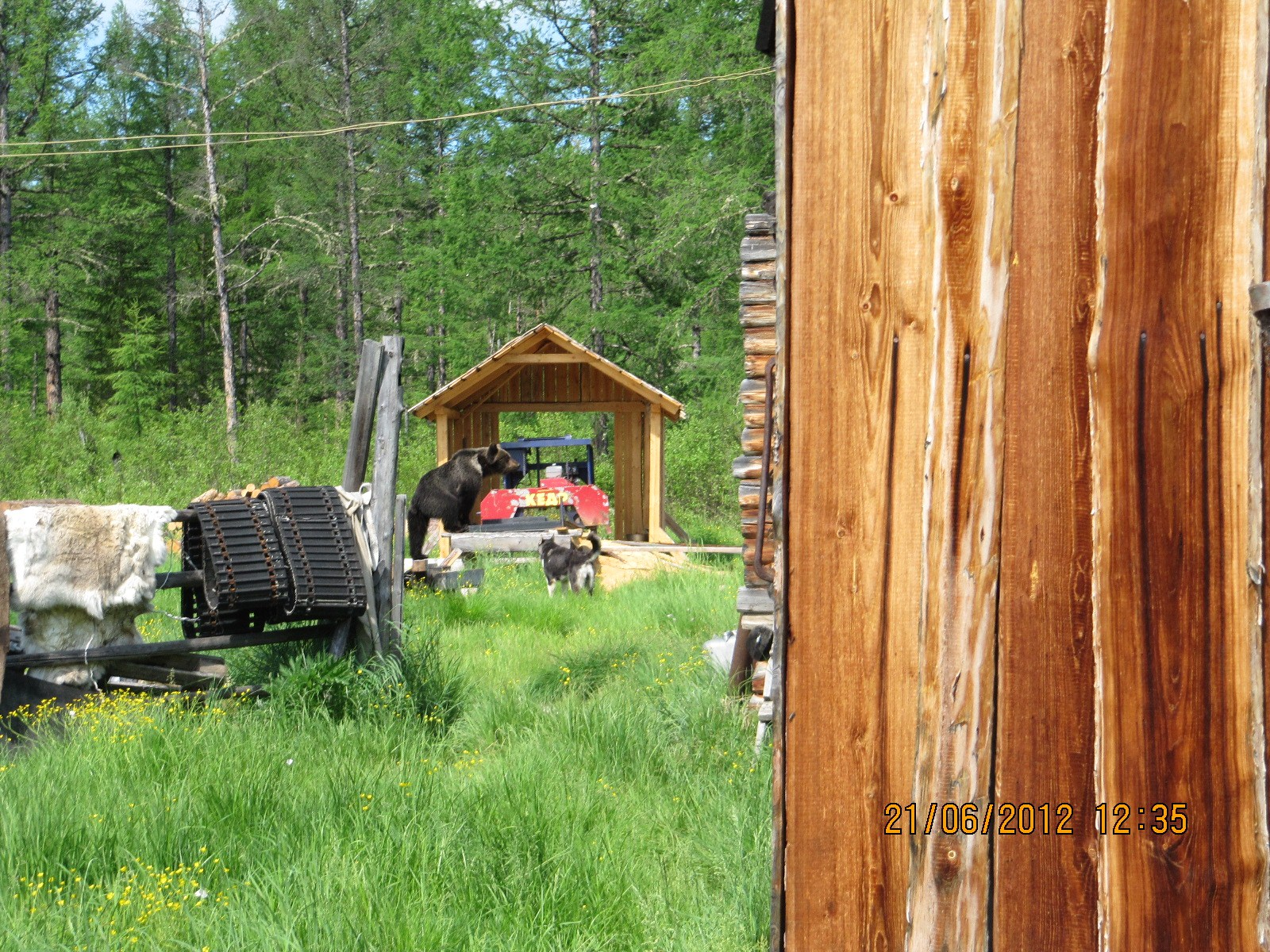
Bear investigating a campsite, Sakha Republic.

Given the vast, wild, and virtually uninhabited territory which they inhabit, Siberian brown bears tend to be much less skittish with the presence of humans, as opposed to the Eurasian or some American brown bear subspecies. European brown bears, for example, as they inhabit a continental area far smaller than Siberia or Russia, are generally warier of people, as they are, more or less, persecuted and feared throughout their range. Both literally and figuratively, European bears are "surrounded" by humans and their dogs on all sides, on an already-cramped continent, a harsh reality which dictates their very movements and behaviours. Thus Siberian brown bears have no fear, and will readily destroy any vulnerable or unprotected food source, including hunters' outdoor food stores, and even homes or huts where there is any enticing scent, leading to potential human-bear confrontations.

As with most bears, Siberian brown bears will actively graze on various grasses and dig for wild roots and tubers, and actively forage on any wild fruits, berries, nuts, seeds, edible flowers, or fungi they may encounter. A favourite, seasonally, is freshwater fish, caught as they migrate up- and downriver to spawn, as well as numerous types of worms, beetles, termites, ants and their eggs, in addition to numerous other invertebrates. Through digging, they will periodically find and hunt ground squirrels, moles, and different wild rodent species, among other terrestrial mammals. Ground-nesting birds and their eggs and chicks may also be consumed, as well as freshwater turtles and their eggs, laid on land. They will also hunt larger mammals, including hares, pikas, moose (elk), reindeer, roe deer, and wapiti.Brood The Siberian brown bear is, reportedly, more actively carnivorous than other Ursus arctos subspecies; this may possibly be due to the ruggedness or the freezing winters of their home range stimulating them to consume more protein and fats before the first snowfall. Additionally, they are said to not indulge in honey, as many bears are, stereotypically, thought to do. Still, as with most bear species, the Siberian brown bear's diet includes a varied amount of animal proteins, often in the form of carrion. In the case of solitary, ornery male bears, their size and temperament may be used to their advantage to gain a "free meal" by intimidating other carnivores, effectively chasing them off of their own fresh kills (generally this happens with wolves, Siberian lynx, or other brown bears). If the smaller predators flee from the larger brown bear, they may ultimately return later when the bear is gone to salvage what they can from the carcass.
