= Enbetsu =

Enbetsu 遠別町 Enbetsu-chō
- Town
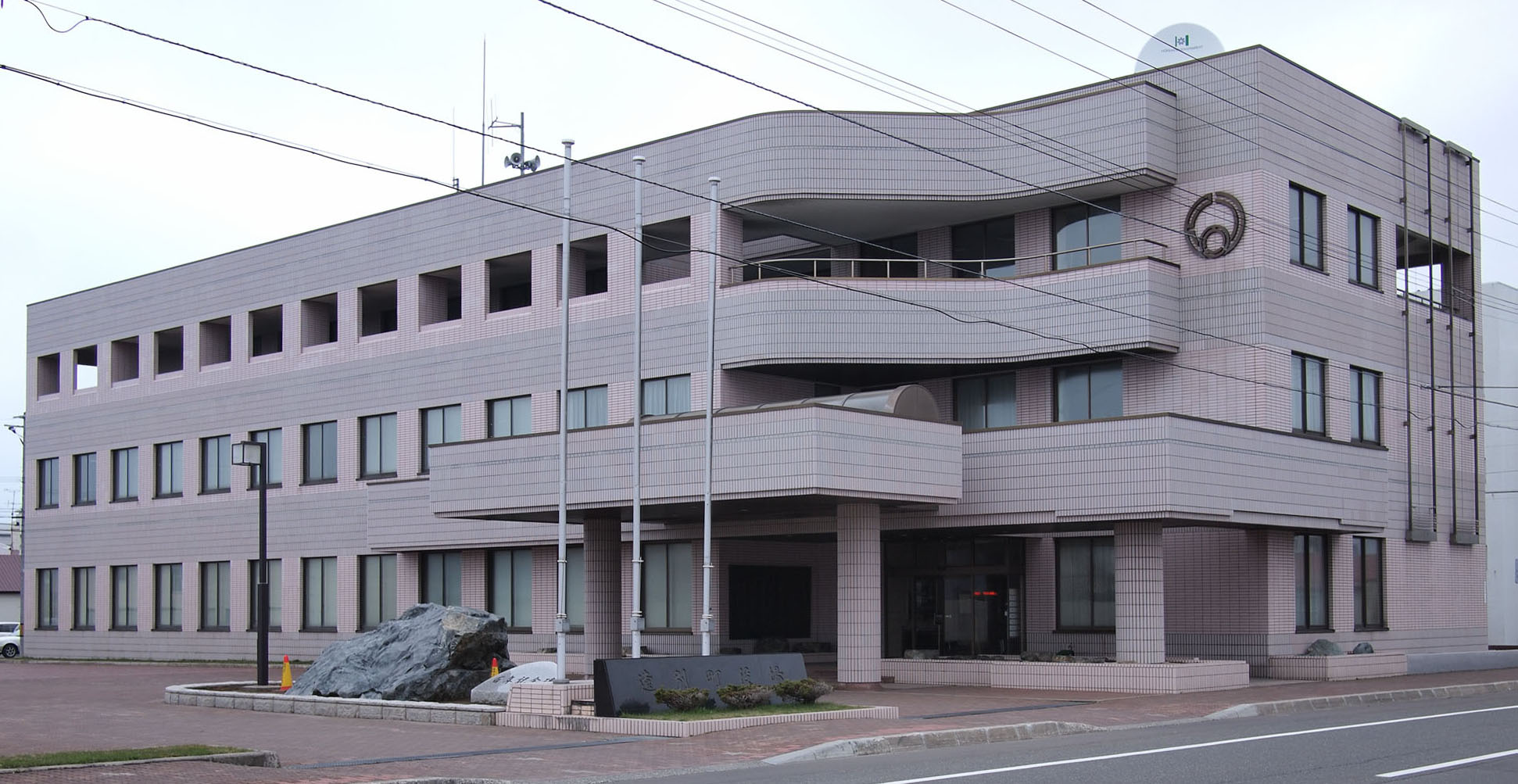
- Town Hall of Enbetsu

- Flag Seal

- Coordinates: 44°43′21″N 141°47′32″E
- Country: Japan
- Prefecture: Hokkaido
- Subprefectures: Rumoi
- Districts of Japan: Teshio District
- Established: 1907

Government
  - Mayor: Masato Kunibe (2012-)

Area
  - Total: 590.80 km^{2} (228.11 sq mi)

Population (January 31, 2025)
  - Total: 2,249
  - Density: 3.807/km^{2} (9.859/sq mi)
- Time zone: UTC+9 (Japan Standard Time)
- Address: 3-37 Honchō, Enbetsu-cho, Teshio-gun, Hokkaido 098-3543
- Climate: Dfb
- Website: Official website (in Japanese)
- Symbols
- Flower: Rhododendron
- Tree: Silver birch

Enbetsu (遠別町, Enbetsu-chō), also known as Embetsu, is a town located in Rumoi, Hokkaidō, Japan. As of 31 January 2025, the town had an estimated population of 2,249 in 1253 households, and a population density of 3.8 people per km^{2}. The total area of the town is 590.80 km^{2} (228.11 sq mi).

== Geography ==
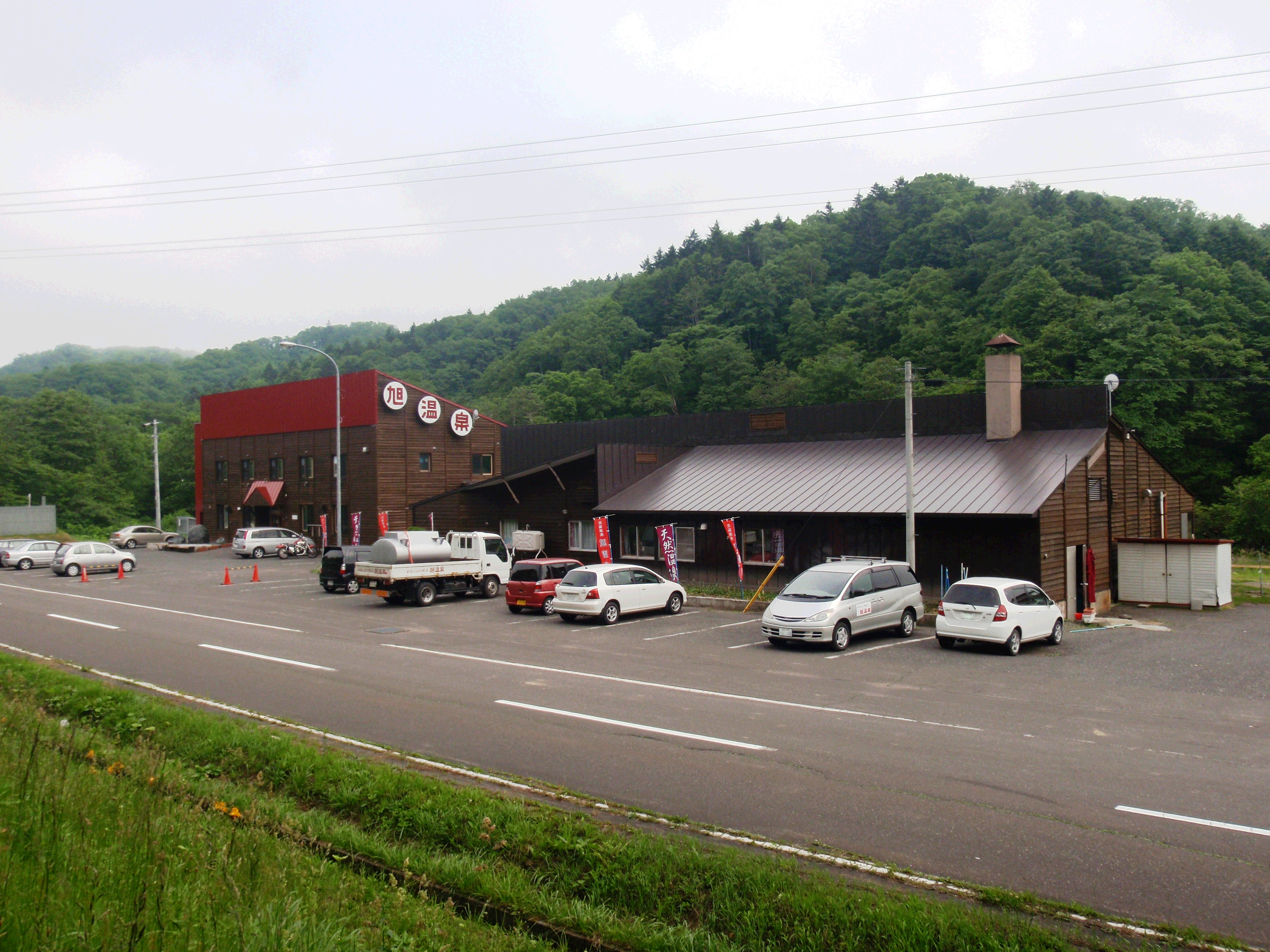
Asahi Spa, Kotoura

Enbetsu is located at the north-northwest of the island of Hokkaido and overlooks the Sea of Japan. The town occupies the drainage basin of the Enbetsu River from its origin on the western slopes of the Teshio Mountains to its mouth at the Sea of Japan. The town is bisected by the Enbetsu River, which flows from the Teshio Mountains directly into the Sea of Japan. Enbetsu is the northernmost area of rice production in Japan. The west of the town is forested and sparsely inhabited. The small commercial and residential center of the town is located at the mouth of the river on the Sea of Japan. Enbetsu is home to an onsen hot spring resort, the Asahi Spa in Kotoura. A small mud volcano is located in the marshes in the immediate vicinity of the hot spring.

=== Rivers ===
The Enbetsu River (62.5 kilometres (38.8 mi)) flows from its source in the Teshio Mountains on the border of Enbetsu and Horokanai, north-northwest through the town and into the Sea of Japan. The city center and town hall are all located at the mouth of the Enbetsu. Major tributaries of the Enbetsu include the Takinosawa, Kumanosawa, Nupuripaomanai, Nupurikeshiomappu, and Rubeshube rivers. Nearly 20 kilometres (12 mi) of the Enbetsu is used for rice paddy agriculture. The rice paddies of the Enbetsu make up the northernmost border of the wide belt of rice production in Japan; the town is therefore known as the northernmost area of rice production in the country. A stone monument to the history of rice production in Japan was constructed in Enbetsu in 1957.

=== Mountains ===
Mount Pisshiri (1,031.5 metres (3,384 ft)), the highest point in Enbetsu, is located to the very south of the town on its border with the towns Haboro and Horokanai. Pisshiri is the highest peak in the Teshio Mountains, and is also the source of the Enbetsu River.

=== Neighboring municipalities ===
Enbetsu borders on five municipalities in Hokkaido Prefecture, three in Rumoi Subprefecture and two in Kamikawa Subprefecture:

- Kamikawa Subprefecture
  - Horokanai
  - Nakagawa
- Rumoi Subprefecture
  - Haboro
  - Shosanbetsu
  - Teshio

=== Climate ===
Teshio is noted for its harsh climate. It has numerous days of rain, few days of sunlight, and strong winds. Temperatures vary widely. The highest recorded temperature in Enbetsu was 34.2 °C (93.6 °F) in 1979, and the lowest was −26.8 °C (−16.2 °F) in 2000. Winds off the Sea of Japan coast support wind farms in the town.

Climate data for Enbetsu, elevation 7 m (23 ft), (1991−2020 normals, extremes 1977−present)
Month	Jan	Feb	Mar	Apr	May	Jun	Jul	Aug	Sep	Oct	Nov	Dec	Year
Record high °C (°F)	9.4 (48.9)	12.2 (54.0)	15.4 (59.7)	23.0 (73.4)	28.1 (82.6)	32.6 (90.7)	33.3 (91.9)	34.2 (93.6)	32.0 (89.6)	22.4 (72.3)	18.6 (65.5)	13.0 (55.4)	34.2 (93.6)
Mean daily maximum °C (°F)	−2.2 (28.0)	−1.5 (29.3)	2.4 (36.3)	8.8 (47.8)	15.2 (59.4)	19.5 (67.1)	23.5 (74.3)	24.6 (76.3)	21.5 (70.7)	14.9 (58.8)	6.9 (44.4)	0.3 (32.5)	11.2 (52.1)
Daily mean °C (°F)	−5.8 (21.6)	−5.6 (21.9)	−1.4 (29.5)	4.6 (40.3)	10.4 (50.7)	14.8 (58.6)	18.9 (66.0)	20.0 (68.0)	16.3 (61.3)	10.2 (50.4)	3.4 (38.1)	−2.8 (27.0)	6.9 (44.5)
Mean daily minimum °C (°F)	−10.5 (13.1)	−11.0 (12.2)	−6.2 (20.8)	−0.1 (31.8)	5.5 (41.9)	10.5 (50.9)	15.0 (59.0)	15.9 (60.6)	11.3 (52.3)	5.4 (41.7)	−0.1 (31.8)	−6.4 (20.5)	2.4 (36.4)
Record low °C (°F)	−26.8 (−16.2)	−25.6 (−14.1)	−23.1 (−9.6)	−11.3 (11.7)	−3.7 (25.3)	0.2 (32.4)	5.7 (42.3)	5.5 (41.9)	1.6 (34.9)	−5.0 (23.0)	−12.8 (9.0)	−21.9 (−7.4)	−26.8 (−16.2)
Average precipitation mm (inches)	73.3 (2.89)	52.4 (2.06)	53.1 (2.09)	50.2 (1.98)	68.9 (2.71)	65.0 (2.56)	123.0 (4.84)	142.5 (5.61)	126.0 (4.96)	134.9 (5.31)	129.4 (5.09)	97.4 (3.83)	1,121.9 (44.17)
Average rainy days	19.5	15.4	13.1	10.8	10.5	9.7	10.0	10.7	11.4	15.8	19.2	21.1	167.2
Mean monthly sunshine hours	48.6	76.4	129.8	165.8	188.4	160.8	155.9	164.2	170.3	119.8	51.0	28.5	1,461.5
Source 1: JMA
Source 2: JMA

== Demographics ==
Per Japanese census data, the population of Enbetsu is as shown below. The town is in a long period of sustained population loss.

Historical population
Year	Pop.	±%
1940	5,962	—
1950	8,227	+38.0%
1960	8,551	+3.9%
1970	6,971	−18.5%
1980	5,375	−22.9%
1990	4,414	−17.9%
2000	3,683	−16.6%
2010	3,084	−16.3%
2020	2,520	−18.3%

== History ==
The first recorded Japanese settler of Enbetsu was Gentarō Shirahata, who moved to Enbetsu in 1896. A group of settlers from Echizen, Fukui Prefecture called the Echizen Dantai came to Enbetsu in the following year. Groups from Aichi, Chiba, and Kumamoto followed, as well as individual settlers. Enbetsu, which had previously been part of Teshio, was established as a separate village in 1909. Rice production was tested as early as 1897, specifically with strains of rice from Fukui Prefecture. After testing numerous strains from other parts of Honshu, 1921 saw a successful rice crop in Enbetsu, and the start of an agricultural industry in the village.

Enbetsu was elevated to town status in 1949. The town grew to a population of 8,944 in 1958, and has entered into a period of sustained depopulation. Both the agriculture and fishing industries of Enbetsu have fallen into decline, notably with the decline of the Pacific herring catch. Younger people from Enbetsu have migrated to work in larger cities in Hokkaido and Honshu, contributing to the depopulation of the town.

== Etymology ==
The name of the town of Enbetsu has its origin in the Ainu language. Three possibilities exist: Wen-pet, meaning "bad river"; "We-bet", meaning "forked river"; or "E-ye-pet", meaning "meeting place river", as Enbetsu was a meeting place of the seaside Ainu and the Ainu of the Teshio Mountains.

== Government ==
Teshio has a mayor-council form of government with a directly elected mayor and a unicameral town council of eight members. Enbetsu, as part of Rumoi sub-prefecture, contributes one member to the Hokkaidō Prefectural Assembly. In terms of national politics, the town is part of the Hokkaidō 10th district of the lower house of the Diet of Japan.

== Economy ==
The primary agricultural product of Enbetsu is rice, specifically of glutinous rice for the preparation of mochi. Asparagus and melons are also grown in the town. The local economy also depends on dairy farming and fishing. Enbetsu is a source of flounder and Yesso scallops.

== Education ==
The Town of Enbetsu Board of Education maintains one elementary school, Enbetsu Elementary School, and one junior high school, Enbetsu Junior High School. The elementary school is located to the northeast of the Town Hall, in the central Honchō district, while the junior high school is located to the southeast, in the eastern Kōwa district. Enbetsu also maintains a single municipal preschool, which is located next to the elementary school.

Hokkaido Enbetsu Agricultural High School, a prefectural high school, is located in the Kitahama district of the town, a short distance from the town center. The high school was founded in 1952.

== Transportation ==
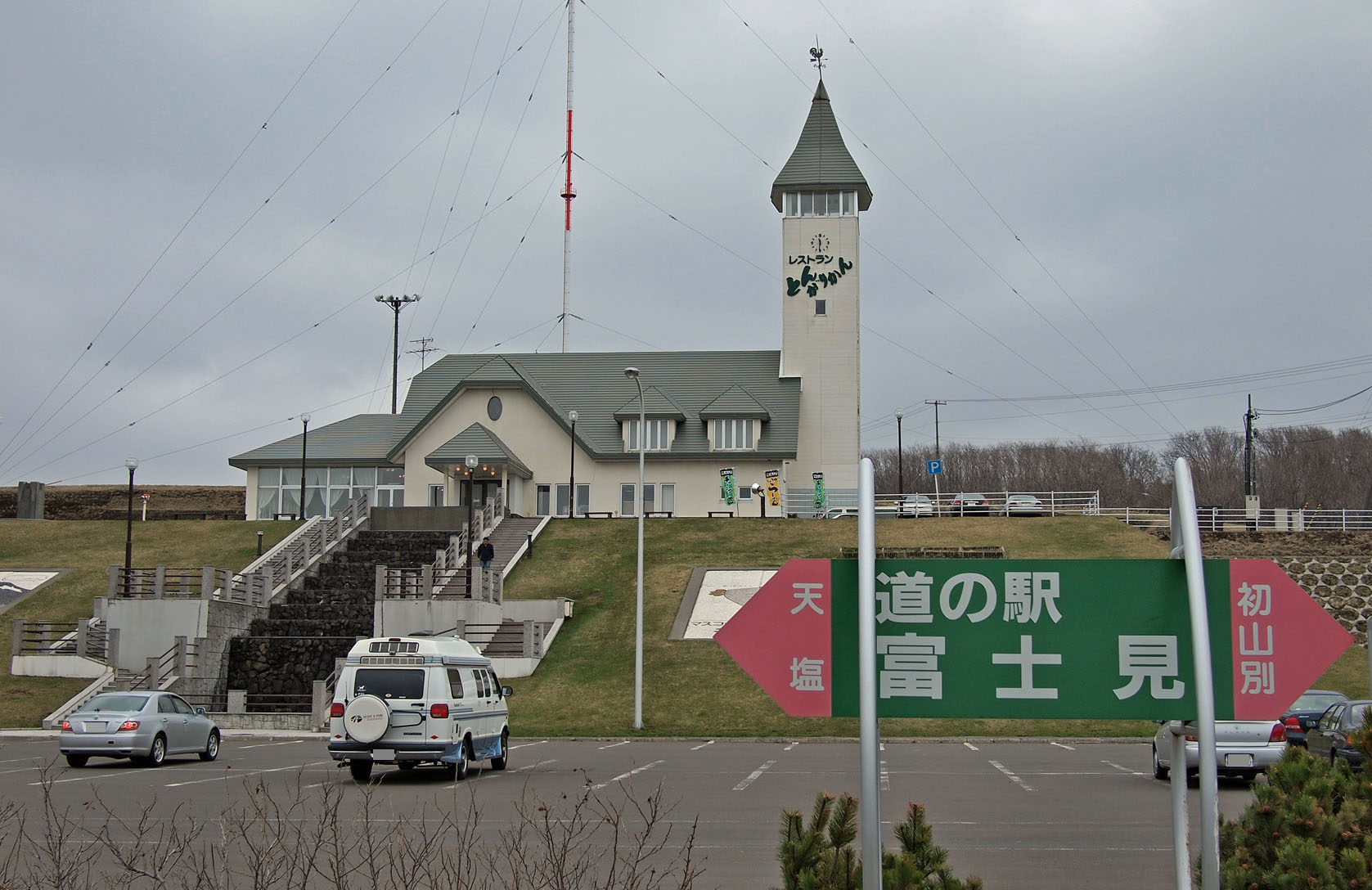
Roadside Station Fujimi

Enbetsu was once connected to the rest of Hokkaido by the JR Hokkaido Haboro Line. The line, completed in 1958, connected Rumoi with Sapporo. Utakoshi, Teshiokanaura, Enbetsu, Keimeikarijōkōjō, and Marumatsu were all stations on the line located in Enbetsu. The Haboro Line was discontinued in March 1987. Currently, the closest JR Hokkaido train stations accessible from Enbetsu via public transport is located in Horonobe, to the north, and Rumoi, to the south.

=== Bus ===
The JR Haboro Line was replaced by the Engan Bus Company. Enbetsu Station is now used as a bus terminal.

=== Highways ===
Enbetsu can be reached by car from Sapporo in approximately four hours, from Asahikawa in three hours, and from Wakkanai or Rumoi in an hour and a half. Japan National Route 232 crosses the town from north to south along the Japan Sea coast.

- National Route 232

== Hospital ==
Enbetsu has a single hospital, the Enbetsu National Health Insurance Hospital. The hospital, a municipal facility, was constructed in 1951, and is located in the central Honchō district of the town. Enbetsu National Health Insurance Hospital is the only hospital between Wakkanai to the north and Rumoi to the south.

== Mascot ==
Momochin, the town's mascot

Enbetsu's mascot is Momochin (モモちん) who is a Ezo flying squirrel. It is discovered in Summer 1992 during an expedition on the woods. Research is still ongoing regarding this mascot but what scientists know is that it is playful and helpful and can also fly. It prefers to wear green and red scarves.

== Sister city relations ==
- - Starting in 1989, Enbetsu has maintained a sister city relationship with Castlegar, BC. As part of the relationship, an educational exchange program occurs each summer between the town and city. Students visit their counterpart in alternating years, fostering an understanding of differing cultures and way of living.
