= Yagishiri Island =

Island in the country of Japan

Yagishiri
Native name: 焼尻島, Yagishiri-tō
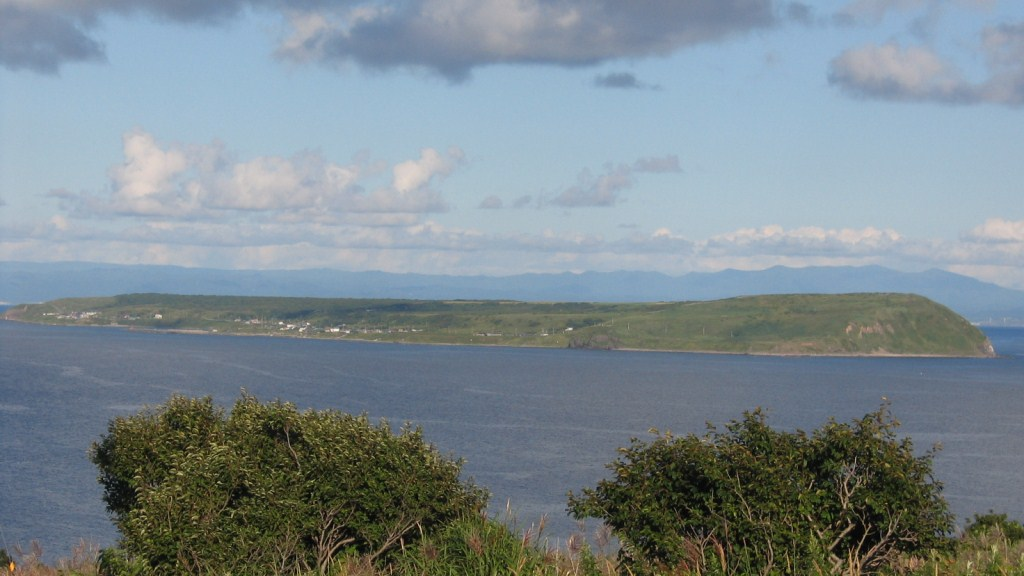
- Yagishiri Island, Haboro, Hokkaido, Japan
- Interactive map of Yagishiri

Geography
- Location: East Asia
- Coordinates: 44°26′N 141°24′E
- Archipelago: Japanese archipelago
- Area: 5.34 km^{2} (2.06 sq mi)
- Length: 4 km (2.5 mi)
- Width: 2 km (1.2 mi)
- Highest elevation: 97 m (318 ft)
- Highest point: Central Yagishiri Island

Administration
- Japan
- Prefecture: Hokkaido
- Subprefecture: Rumoi Subprefecture
- District: Tomamae District
- Town: Haboro

Demographics
- Population: 273 (2010)
- Pop. density: 51/km^{2} (132/sq mi)
- Ethnic groups: Ainu; Japanese

Yagishiri Island (焼尻島, Yagishiri-tō) is a small, sparsely populated island in the Sea of Japan, 23 kilometres (14 mi) northwest of Haboro Bay in Haboro, Hokkaido. The island, along with neighboring Teuri Island on its west side, belongs to the town of Haboro in Rumoi Subprefecture. It is noted for its dense forests; fully two-thirds of it remains forested.

== History ==
Yagishiri Island, like nearby Teuri, became a base for the fishing of Pacific herring beginning in 1786. In the modern period Yagishiri Island has seen a long-term population decline: in 1947 there were 2,283 residents, by 1972 the number had fallen to 1,073, and in 2010 the population had fallen to 273.

== Geography ==
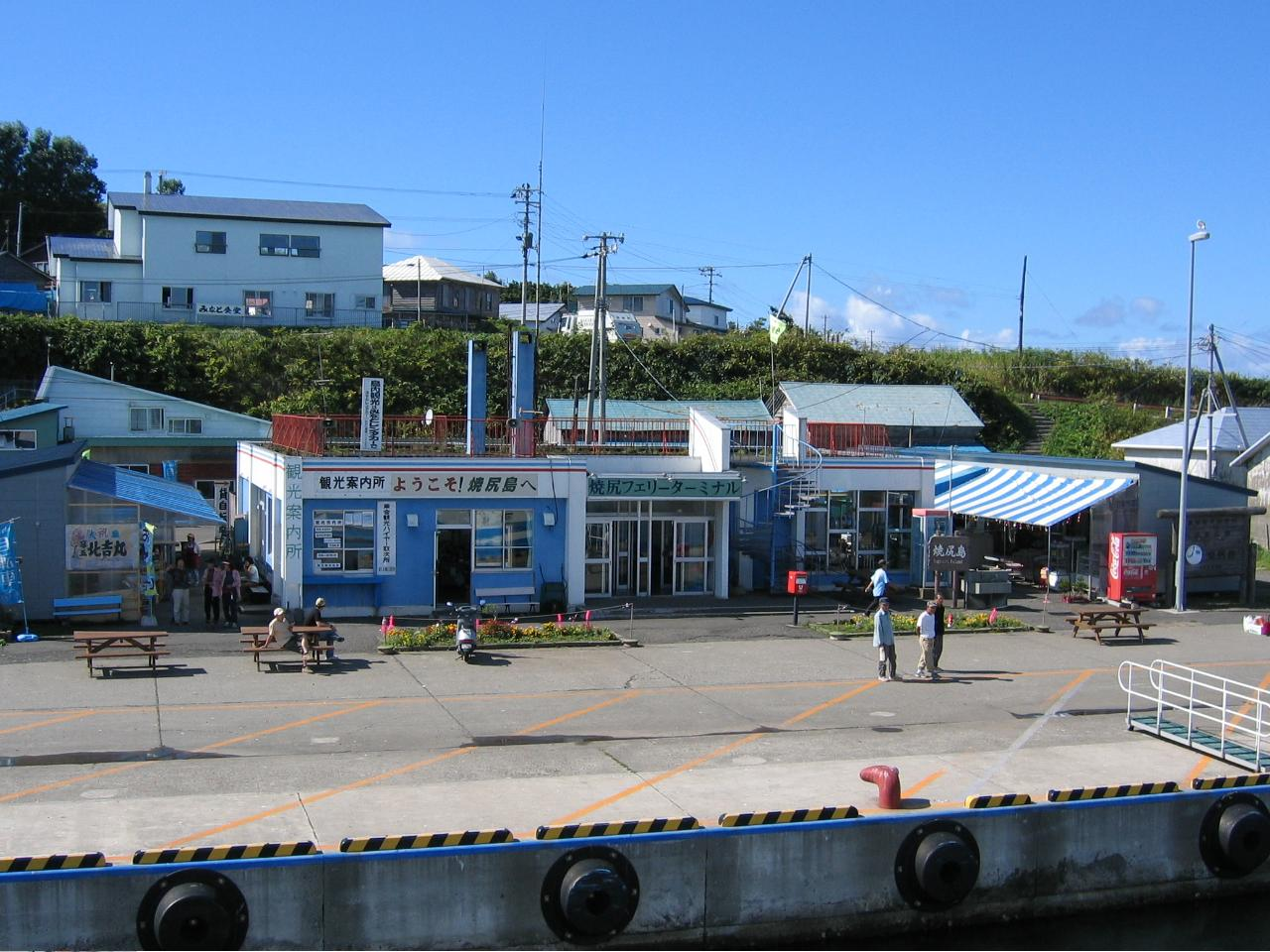
Port of Yagishiri, Yagishiri Island

Yagishiri is located 3.5 kilometres (2.2 mi) east of Teuri Island, and the two islands are separated by the Musashi Channel. The island is approximately 4 kilometres (2.5 mi) long from east to west, 2 kilometres (1.2 mi) from north to south and covers 5.34 square kilometres (2.06 mi^{2}). It has a coastline of roughly 12 kilometres (7.5 mi).

Yagishiri is flatter than nearby Teuri and reaches an elevation at its center of only 97 metres (318 ft). Yagishiri Island is primarily composed of Tertiary-period andesite formed into a four marine terraces, some with significant marine cliffs.

=== Climate ===
Climate data for Yagishiri, 1991–2020 normals, extremes 1977–present
| Month | Jan | Feb | Mar | Apr | May | Jun | Jul | Aug | Sep | Oct | Nov | Dec | Year |
|---|---|---|---|---|---|---|---|---|---|---|---|---|---|
| Record high °C (°F) | 7.0 (44.6) | 7.4 (45.3) | 13.6 (56.5) | 20.1 (68.2) | 26.4 (79.5) | 26.1 (79.0) | 31.2 (88.2) | 31.6 (88.9) | 28.9 (84.0) | 21.8 (71.2) | 17.0 (62.6) | 12.6 (54.7) | 31.6 (88.9) |
| Mean daily maximum °C (°F) | −1.3 (29.7) | −0.9 (30.4) | 2.6 (36.7) | 8.2 (46.8) | 13.3 (55.9) | 17.5 (63.5) | 21.5 (70.7) | 23.4 (74.1) | 20.9 (69.6) | 14.9 (58.8) | 7.5 (45.5) | 1.1 (34.0) | 10.7 (51.3) |
| Daily mean °C (°F) | −3.3 (26.1) | −3.1 (26.4) | 0.3 (32.5) | 5.3 (41.5) | 10.1 (50.2) | 14.4 (57.9) | 18.6 (65.5) | 20.7 (69.3) | 18.1 (64.6) | 12.3 (54.1) | 4.9 (40.8) | −1.2 (29.8) | 8.1 (46.6) |
| Mean daily minimum °C (°F) | −5.3 (22.5) | −5.2 (22.6) | −2.0 (28.4) | 2.8 (37.0) | 7.5 (45.5) | 12.0 (53.6) | 16.4 (61.5) | 18.5 (65.3) | 15.6 (60.1) | 9.6 (49.3) | 2.3 (36.1) | −3.3 (26.1) | 5.7 (42.3) |
| Record low °C (°F) | −14.5 (5.9) | −14.8 (5.4) | −11.4 (11.5) | −4.1 (24.6) | −1.1 (30.0) | 4.2 (39.6) | 9.2 (48.6) | 12.2 (54.0) | 7.6 (45.7) | 0.0 (32.0) | −9.1 (15.6) | −12.2 (10.0) | −14.8 (5.4) |
| Average precipitation mm (inches) | 47.8 (1.88) | 32.2 (1.27) | 32.6 (1.28) | 37.8 (1.49) | 59.3 (2.33) | 58.2 (2.29) | 109.1 (4.30) | 118.2 (4.65) | 124.8 (4.91) | 117.1 (4.61) | 105.9 (4.17) | 70.4 (2.77) | 913.4 (35.95) |
| Average precipitation days (≥ 1.0 mm) | 15.5 | 11.1 | 9.0 | 8.5 | 9.2 | 8.1 | 9.2 | 9.8 | 11.7 | 14.6 | 15.4 | 16.1 | 138.2 |
| Mean monthly sunshine hours | 54.6 | 88.6 | 157.6 | 201.4 | 209.8 | 181.5 | 175.3 | 187.2 | 195.5 | 147.8 | 70.2 | 44.3 | 1,713.9 |
Source 1: JMA
Source 2: JMA

== Yagishiritō Lighthouse ==
The island has a single lighthouse, Yagishiritō Lighthouse, located 40 metres (130 ft) above sea level just south of the small Port of Yagishiri. The lighthouse is a 13 metres (43 ft) concrete structure, painted white, and was constructed in February 1913. The Yagishiritō Lighthouse has an intensity of 7,000 candela.

== Forest of Yagishiri ==
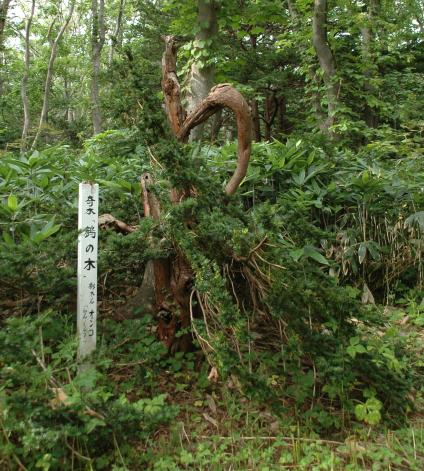
Taxus cuspidata, the Japanese yew, in the forest of Yagishiri Island

Yagishiri Island is noted for its dense forest. The island was once completely covered with trees, but major parts of the forest were used for housing and other construction with the start of the trade of Pacific herring in the late 18th century. A prohibition was put in place on the cutting of trees on the island in 1880 to prevent the complete deforestation of the island. Shortly afterward, in 1886, two thirds of the forest of Yagishiri was lost to a fire. The island has been significantly reforested, with the Uguisu Valley in the center of the island remaining untouched by development or fire. Climatic conditions on the Japan Sea keep the canopy of the forest, specifically in the Uguisu Valley, as low as 10 metres (33 ft), and the trunks of various species of trees in the forest are correspondingly thick. The forest is homes to 50 species of trees, but Yagishiri Island is noted for its unspoiled stands of Taxus cuspidata, the Japanese yew. The forest of Yagishiri is a protected natural monument of Japan, and the entirety of the island is protected as a part of Shokanbetsu-Teuri-Yagishiri Quasi-National Park.

== Transportation ==
Yagishiri Island is connected by two ferries to the port at Haburo. The island is reached by the Ororon 2 in 60 minutes, and the Sanraina in 35 minutes. In winter it is served by one trip per day by the Orororan 2, and at the peak tourist season in August the ferries each run three times per day. A single road, the Yagishiri Road (焼尻島線, Yagishi Tōsen), circles the island.
