= Teuri Island =

Island in the country of Japan

Teuri
Native name: 天売島, Teuri-tō
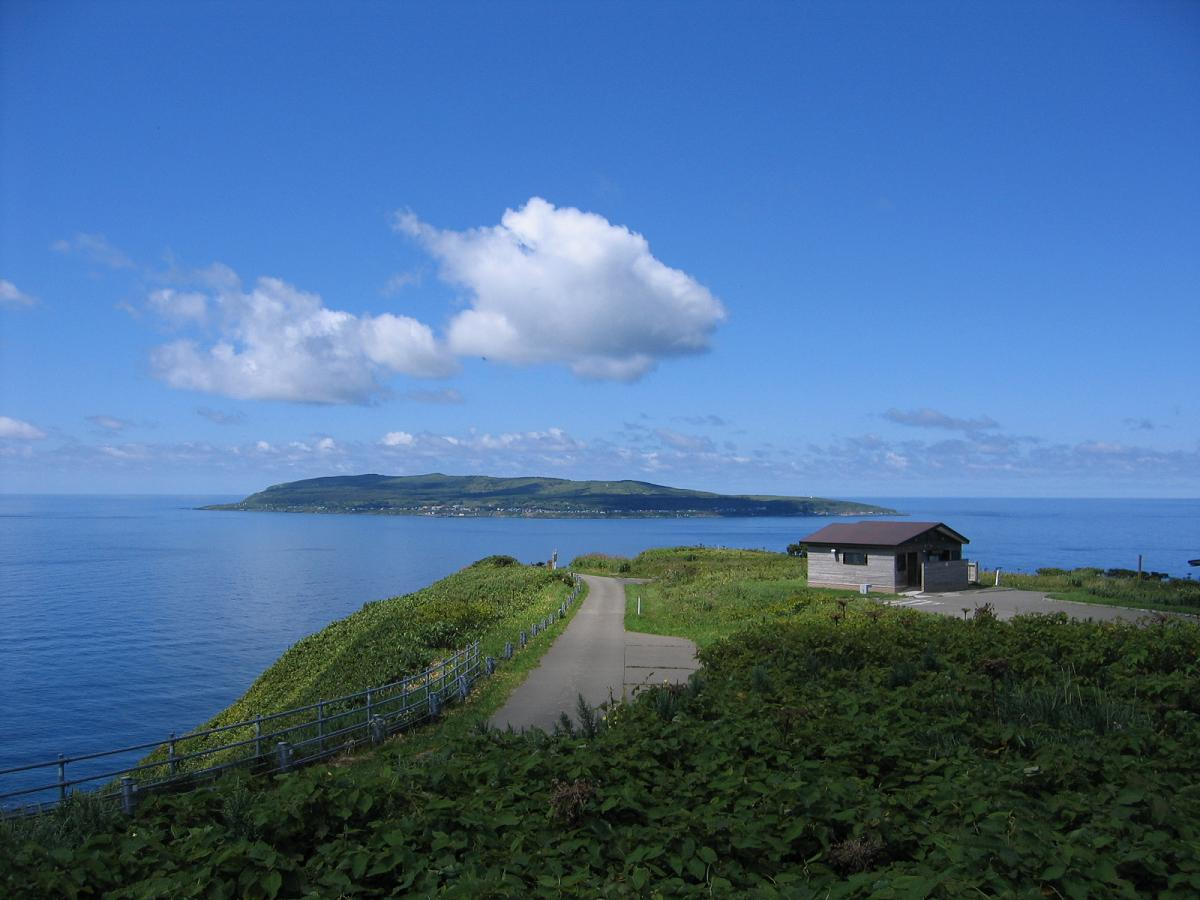
- Teuri Island, Haboro, Hokkaidō, Japan
- Interactive map of Teuri

Geography
- Location: East Asia
- Coordinates: 44°25′N 141°18′E
- Archipelago: Japanese archipelago
- Area: 5.5 km^{2} (2.1 sq mi)
- Coastline: 12 km (7.5 mi)
- Highest elevation: 184.5 m (605.3 ft)
- Highest point: Southwest Teuri Island

Administration
- Japan
- Prefecture: Hokkaido
- Subprefecture: Rumoi Subprefecture
- District: Tomamae District
- Town: Haboro

Demographics
- Population: 366 (2010)
- Pop. density: 66.5/km^{2} (172.2/sq mi)
- Ethnic groups: Ainu, Japanese

Teuri Island (天売島 Teuri-tō) is an island in the Sea of Japan 30 km west of Haboro port in Haboro, Tomamae District, in the Rumoi Subprefecture in Hokkaido. The Island, along with neighboring Yagishiri island on its east side, belongs to the town of Haboro in Rumoi Subprefecture. The island has an area of 5.5 square kilometers (2.1 sq mi), with 12 km of coastline, and the population is 317 people as of March, Heisei 20 (2008). It is said that the name of the island comes from the Ainu language, where the name could either be interpreted as “fish back” or “leg.”

== Overview ==
The island's cliff-lined northwest coast serves as a breeding ground for common guillemot, Rhinoceros Auklet, Spectacled Guillemot, Japanese cormorant, and slaty-backed gull. For this reason, on August 8, 1939, Teuri island was appointed as a natural monument and now is known as "Teuri Island seabird breeding ground". The island has been recognised as an Important Bird Area (IBA) by BirdLife International for its seabird colonies. On March 31, 1982, Teuri island was designated part of the Wildlife Protection Areas in Japan. In Haboro town, in order to protect wildlife such as seabirds, measures have been taken since April 2012 to control the increase of the local population of stray cats.

Currently, Teuri island is covered with greenery, but in the Meiji era, most of the forest in the island was lost due to settlers and the frequent occurrence of forest fires. After World War II, Hokkaido began a land restoration project in order to reforest the island after the previous damage. Owing to the harsh natural environment on the island, the land restoration project underwent some difficulty, but the results were finally seen by August 1, 1990. The island is now designated as part of the Shokanbetsu-Teuri-Yagishiri Quasi-National Park as one of the must-see sightseeing places in Japan.

== Transport ==
Teuri port

- Haboro Enkai Ferry
- Haboro-Yagishiri-Teuri(High-speed craft take about one hour and with ferry one hour and thirty-five minutes)
- Yagishiri-Teuri(High-speed craft take about fifteen minutes and with ferry twenty-five minutes)

Hokkaido Prefectural Road Route 548 is the general road for the Teuri island that made into an anti 6 shape.

== Landmark ==
- Kannonzaki Observatory
- Akaiwa Observatory
- Seabird Observatory
- Chidorigaura
