= Haboro, Hokkaido =

Haboro 羽幌町
- Town
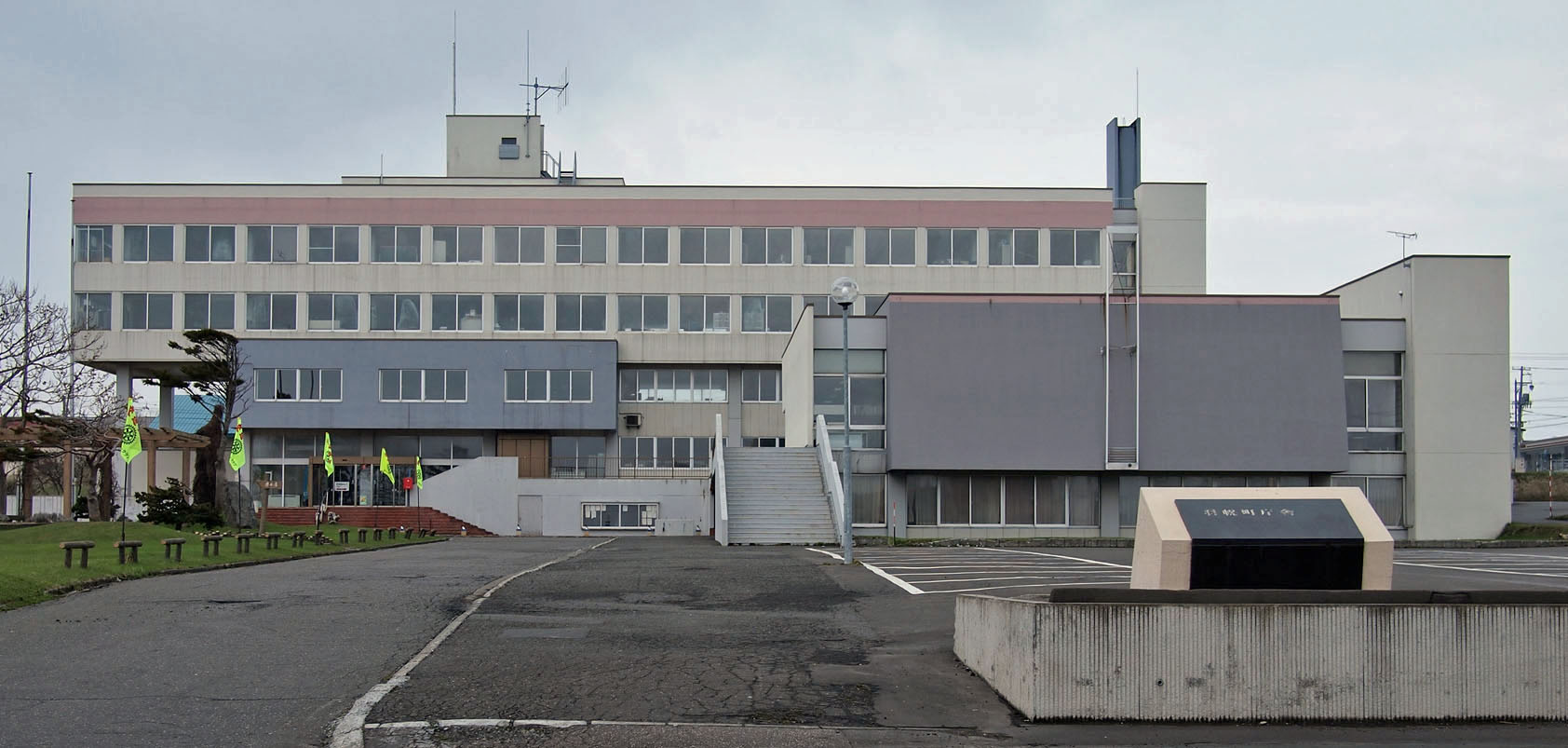
- Haboro Town Hall

- Flag Emblem
- Interactive map of Haboro
- Location in Japan
- Coordinates: 44°21′38″N 141°41′50″E
- Country: Japan
- Region: Hokkaido
- Prefecture: Hokkaido (Rumoi)
- District: Tomamae

Area
  - Total: 472.65 km^{2} (182.49 sq mi)

Population (January 31, 2025)
  - Total: 5,932
  - Density: 12.55/km^{2} (32.51/sq mi)
- Time zone: UTC+09:00 (JST)
- City hall address: 1-1 Minamimachi, Haboro-cho, Tomamae-gun, Hokkaido 078-4198
- Climate: Dfb
- Website: Official website
- Symbols
- Flower: Azalea
- Tree: Japanese yew

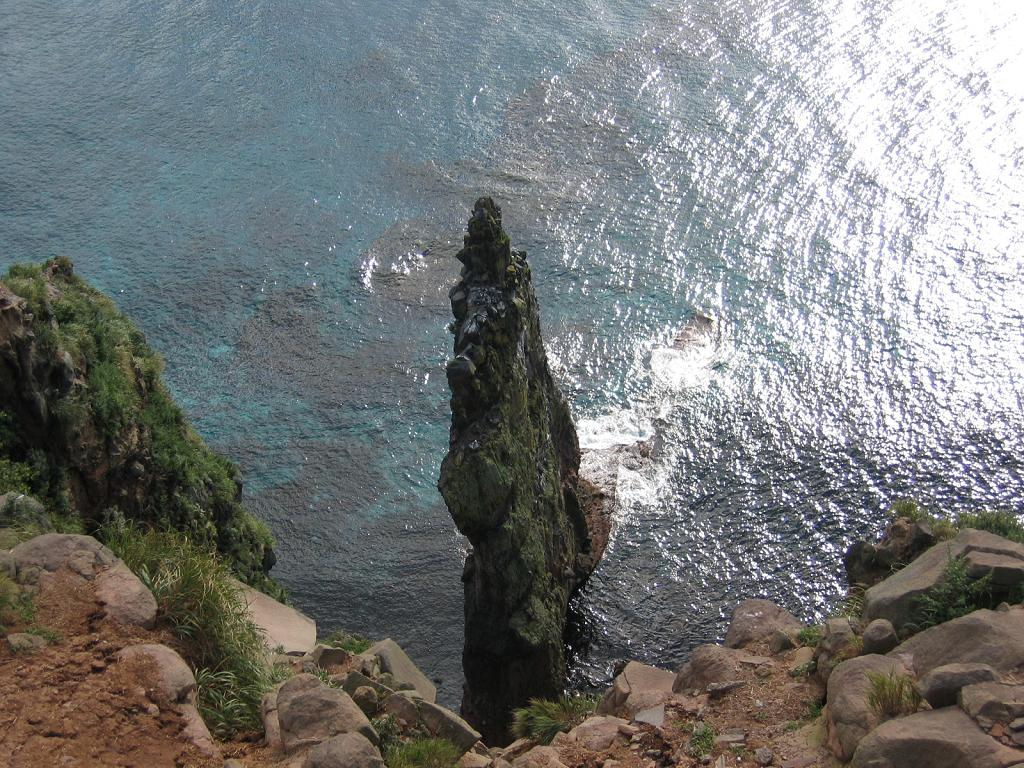
Awaiwa on Teuri Island

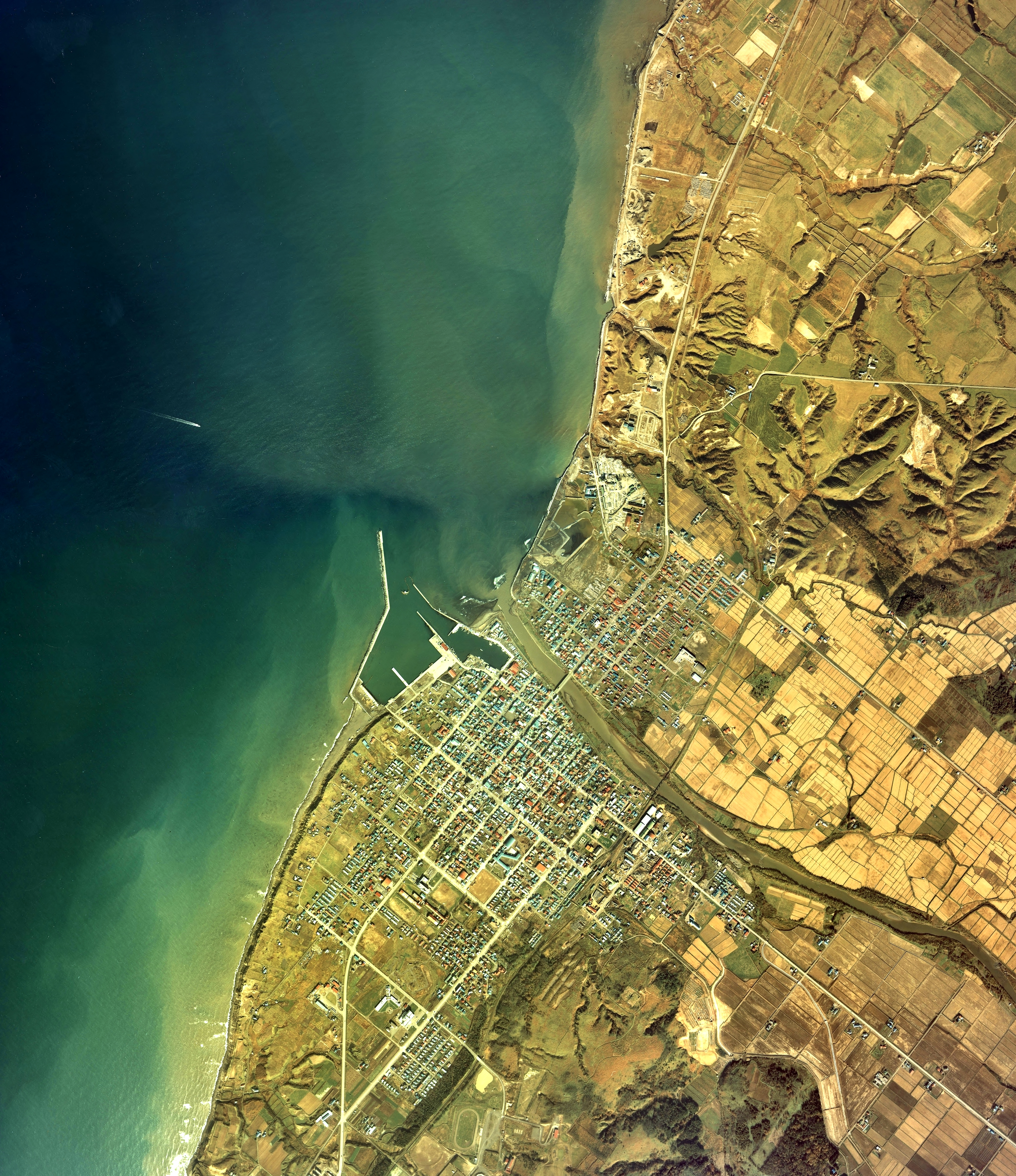
Haboro town center area

Haboro (羽幌町, Haboro-chō) is a town located in Rumoi Subprefecture, Hokkaido, Japan.As of 31 January 2025, the town had an estimated population of 5,932 in 3315 households, and a population density of 13 people per km^{2}. The total area of the town is 472.65 km^{2} (182.49 sq mi).

== Geography ==
Haboro faces the Sea of Japan. Much of the area of the town is within the Teshio Mountains, and much of the town is protected as a national forest. Mount Pisshiri is the highest point in the city at 1,032 metres (3,386 ft). Two rivers cross the town: the Haboro and the Chikubetsu.

=== Islands ===
The municipality of Haboro includes two sparsely populated islands in the Sea of Japan.

- Yagishiri Island (23 kilometres (14 mi)), population 273, is located northwest of Haboro Bay, and is known for its dense forests.
- Teuri Island, population 366, is located 3.5 kilometres (2.2 mi) west of Yagashiri, and the two islands are separated by the Musashi Channel. Teuri covers 5.5 square kilometres (2.1 mi^{2}), and is protected as a bird sanctuary.

=== Neighboring municipalities ===
- Rumoi Subprefecture
  - Tomamae District：Tomamae, Shosanbetsu
  - Teshio District：Enbetsu
- Kamikawa Subprefecture
  - Uryū District：Horokanai

=== Climate ===
Haboro has a humid continental climate (Köppen climate classification Dfb) with warm summers and cold winters. Precipitation is high throughout the year; the months from August to December are wetter than the rest of the year. The highest temperature recorded was 34.4 °C (94 °F) on August 1, 2021. The coldest temperature ever recorded was −26.4 °C (−15.5 °F) on 27 January 1923.

Climate data for Haboro, elevation 8 m (26 ft), (1991−2020 normals, extremes 1921−present)
Month	Jan	Feb	Mar	Apr	May	Jun	Jul	Aug	Sep	Oct	Nov	Dec	Year
Record high °C (°F)	8.6 (47.5)	12.4 (54.3)	17.1 (62.8)	25.0 (77.0)	28.2 (82.8)	30.9 (87.6)	34.2 (93.6)	34.4 (93.9)	33.9 (93.0)	25.4 (77.7)	20.1 (68.2)	12.4 (54.3)	34.4 (93.9)
Mean maximum °C (°F)	4.1 (39.4)	5.4 (41.7)	10.4 (50.7)	18.9 (66.0)	24.2 (75.6)	26.2 (79.2)	28.8 (83.8)	29.5 (85.1)	27.6 (81.7)	21.4 (70.5)	15.5 (59.9)	7.5 (45.5)	30.6 (87.1)
Mean daily maximum °C (°F)	−1.3 (29.7)	−0.7 (30.7)	3.1 (37.6)	9.4 (48.9)	15.4 (59.7)	19.3 (66.7)	23.1 (73.6)	24.7 (76.5)	21.6 (70.9)	15.2 (59.4)	7.5 (45.5)	1.0 (33.8)	11.5 (52.7)
Daily mean °C (°F)	−4.3 (24.3)	−4.0 (24.8)	−0.1 (31.8)	5.5 (41.9)	11.2 (52.2)	15.5 (59.9)	19.6 (67.3)	20.9 (69.6)	17.4 (63.3)	11.2 (52.2)	4.4 (39.9)	−1.7 (28.9)	8.0 (46.3)
Mean daily minimum °C (°F)	−8.3 (17.1)	−8.4 (16.9)	−4.2 (24.4)	1.2 (34.2)	6.9 (44.4)	12.0 (53.6)	16.3 (61.3)	17.3 (63.1)	12.8 (55.0)	6.9 (44.4)	1.0 (33.8)	−4.7 (23.5)	4.1 (39.3)
Mean minimum °C (°F)	−17.7 (0.1)	−17.4 (0.7)	−12.4 (9.7)	−4.4 (24.1)	0.3 (32.5)	6.0 (42.8)	10.6 (51.1)	11.5 (52.7)	6.2 (43.2)	0.9 (33.6)	−5.1 (22.8)	−13.3 (8.1)	−19.2 (−2.6)
Record low °C (°F)	−26.4 (−15.5)	−26.1 (−15.0)	−22.8 (−9.0)	−11.4 (11.5)	−3.6 (25.5)	−0.8 (30.6)	3.7 (38.7)	4.4 (39.9)	1.9 (35.4)	−4.7 (23.5)	−13.6 (7.5)	−22.5 (−8.5)	−26.4 (−15.5)
Average precipitation mm (inches)	116.5 (4.59)	82.2 (3.24)	67.8 (2.67)	58.1 (2.29)	72.2 (2.84)	67.8 (2.67)	129.8 (5.11)	136.6 (5.38)	143.8 (5.66)	152.0 (5.98)	161.1 (6.34)	149.9 (5.90)	1,337.7 (52.67)
Average snowfall cm (inches)	159 (63)	110 (43)	65 (26)	8 (3.1)	0 (0)	0 (0)	0 (0)	0 (0)	0 (0)	0 (0)	44 (17)	154 (61)	535 (211)
Average extreme snow depth cm (inches)	85 (33)	97 (38)	86 (34)	26 (10)	0 (0)	0 (0)	0 (0)	0 (0)	0 (0)	0 (0)	18 (7.1)	54 (21)	99 (39)
Average precipitation days (≥ 1.0 mm)	23.0	17.5	13.8	10.1	9.7	8.4	9.3	10.4	12.2	15.5	19.8	23.0	172.7
Average snowy days (≥ 3.0 cm)	23.9	19.0	15.1	2.2	0	0	0	0	0	0.1	8.3	21.7	90.3
Average relative humidity (%)	75	73	70	70	74	80	83	81	76	71	71	73	75
Mean monthly sunshine hours	52.8	77.1	133.8	174.2	203.1	177.3	168.1	173.7	172.1	125.5	53.4	32.5	1,543.6
Source 1: Japan Meteorological Agency
Source 2: Météo Climat

=== Demographics ===
Per Japanese census data, the population of Haboro is as shown below. The town is in a long period of sustained population loss.

Historical population
Year	Pop.	±%
1940	12,392	—
1950	22,545	+81.9%
1960	28,168	+24.9%
1970	28,574	+1.4%
1980	13,254	−53.6%
1990	10,944	−17.4%
2000	9,364	−14.4%
2010	7,960	−15.0%
2020	6,548	−17.7%

== History ==
Haboro village was established in 1894. The town's full-scale development began in the mid-Meiji period, later than the neighboring towns of Tomamae and Shosanbetsu, but since the discovery of the Haboro Coal Mine, which produced high-quality coal, in the Taisho period, it developed into a monoculture settlement centered on coal. Haboro was officially designated a town in 1921. The villages of Teuri and Yagishiri were merged into Haboro in 1955 and 1959, respectively. In the 1965 census, the town had a population of 30,266 and 6,840 households, and flourished as one of the leading coal mining towns in Hokkaido and the country. However, since the mine closed in 1971, depopulation has been significant.

== Etymology ==
The name of the town is from the Ainu language, but of uncertain origin. Haboro may have originated with the Ainu language word hapuru, meaning "a soft sound", or haporopetsu, meaning "the basin of a large river".

In Japanese, the name of the town is written with ateji, or kanji characters used to phonetically represent native or borrowed words. The first, 羽, means "feather" or "wings", and the second, 幌, means "curtain" or "cloth".

== Government ==
Haboro has a mayor-council form of government with a directly elected mayor and a unicameral town council of nine members. Haboro, as part of Rumoi sub-prefecture, contributes one member to the Hokkaidō Prefectural Assembly. In terms of national politics, the town is part of the Hokkaidō 10th district of the lower house of the Diet of Japan.

== Economy ==
The local economy of Haboro is centered on commercial fishing and agriculture, and there are attempts to develop the tourism industry, taking advantage of the coal mine remnants and the Shokanbetsu-Teuri-Yagishiri Quasi-National Park

== Education ==
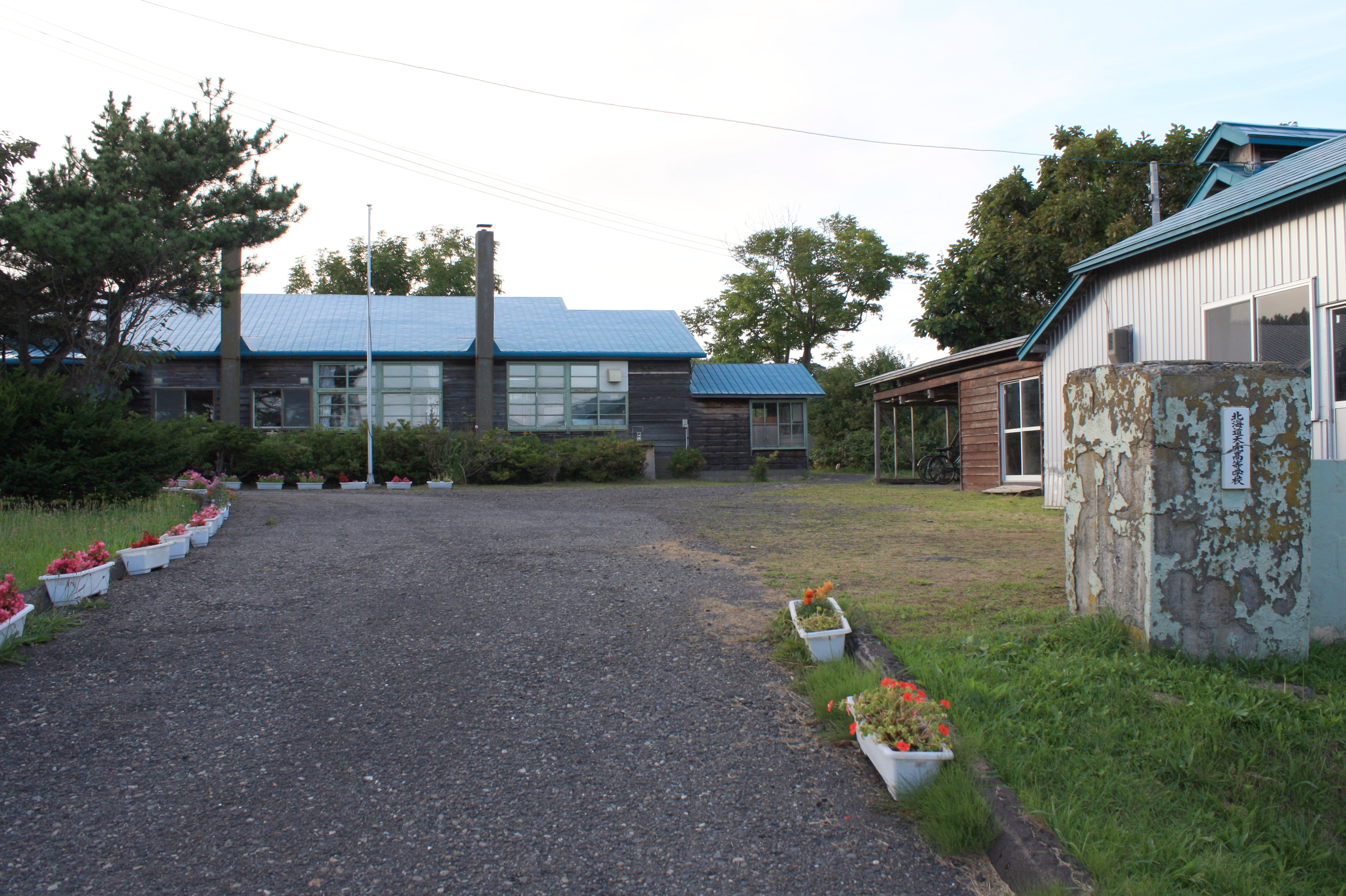
Teuri High School, Teuri Island, Haboro

Haboro has three public elementary schools and three public junior high schools operated by the town government, and two public high schoolsoperated by the Hokkaidō Board of Education.

=== High schools ===
- Haboro Senior High School
- Teuri Senior High School

=== Junior high schools ===
- Haboro Junior High School
- Teuri Junior High School
- Yagishiri Junior High School

=== Elementary school ===
- Haboro Elementary School
- Teuri Elementary School
- Yagishiri Elementary School

== Transportation ==
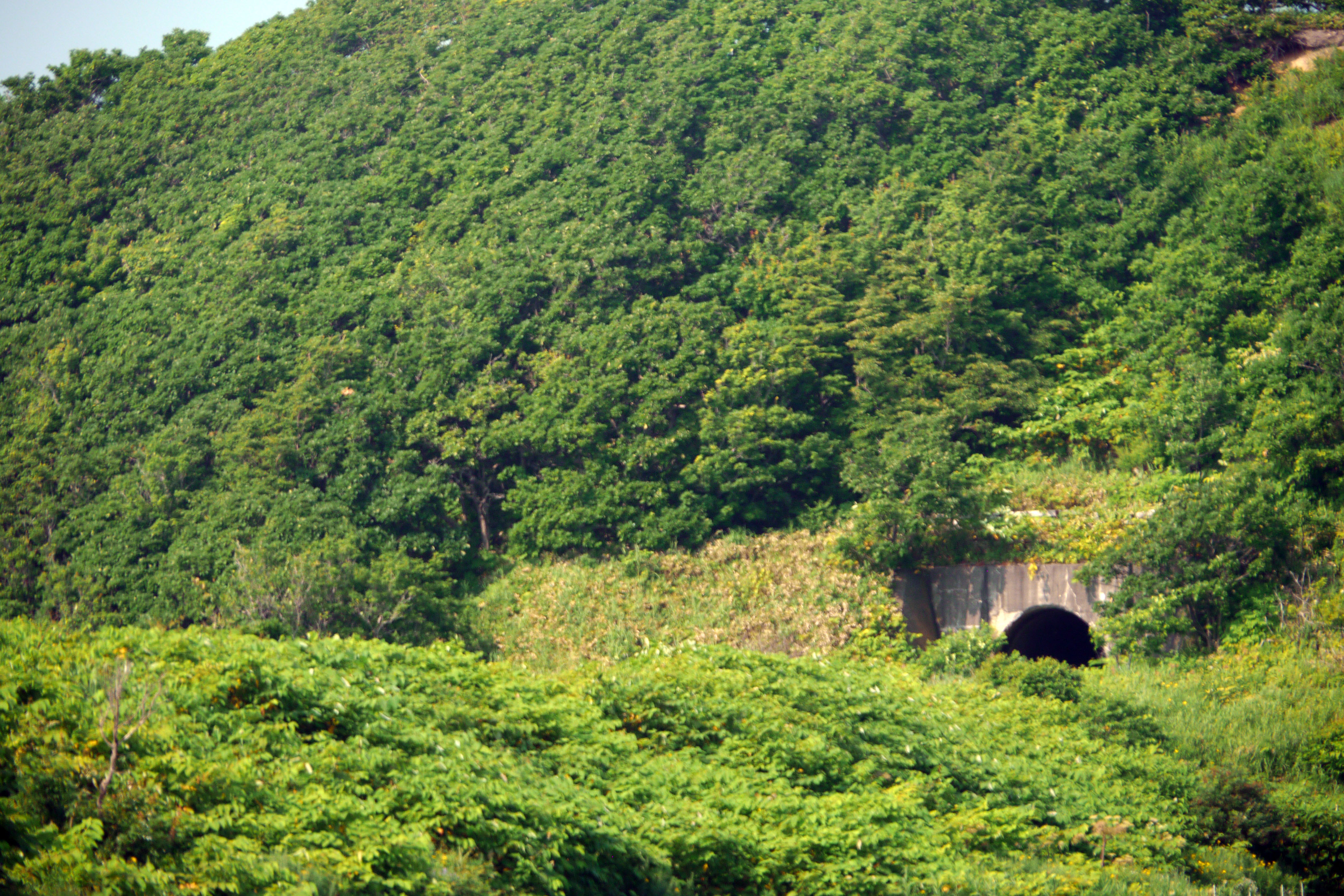
Abandoned rail tunnel of the JNR Haboro Line

=== Railway ===
Haboro was originally connected to other areas of Hokkaido by rail. The Japanese National Railways Haboro Line extended 141.1 km between Rumoi and Horonobe. Construction on the line dated to 1927, but it was discontinued in 1987 with the establishment of JR Hokkaido during the privatization of Japanese National Railways.

=== Highway ===
Haboro is crossed by National Route 232, a national highway of Japan that ranges across western Hokkaido between Wakkanai and Rumoi. Teuri and Yagishiri have a single road surrounding the island.

=== Ferry ===
The islands of Yagishiri and Teuri are served by ferry from the Port of Haboro.

== Port of Haboro ==
The Port of Haboro was established in March 1953. It is administered by the town.

== Mascot ==
Orobo, the town's mascot

Haboro's mascot is Orobo (オロ坊). He is a fashionable common murre. He contributes to the town by promoting sightseeing and certain events. He eats sand eels. As an auk, he is a skilled swimmer. He owns a hat collection (of which his most favourite is his shrimp toque). Children often mistake him for a penguin.
