= Shosanbetsu Observatory =

Observatory in Hokkaido, Japan

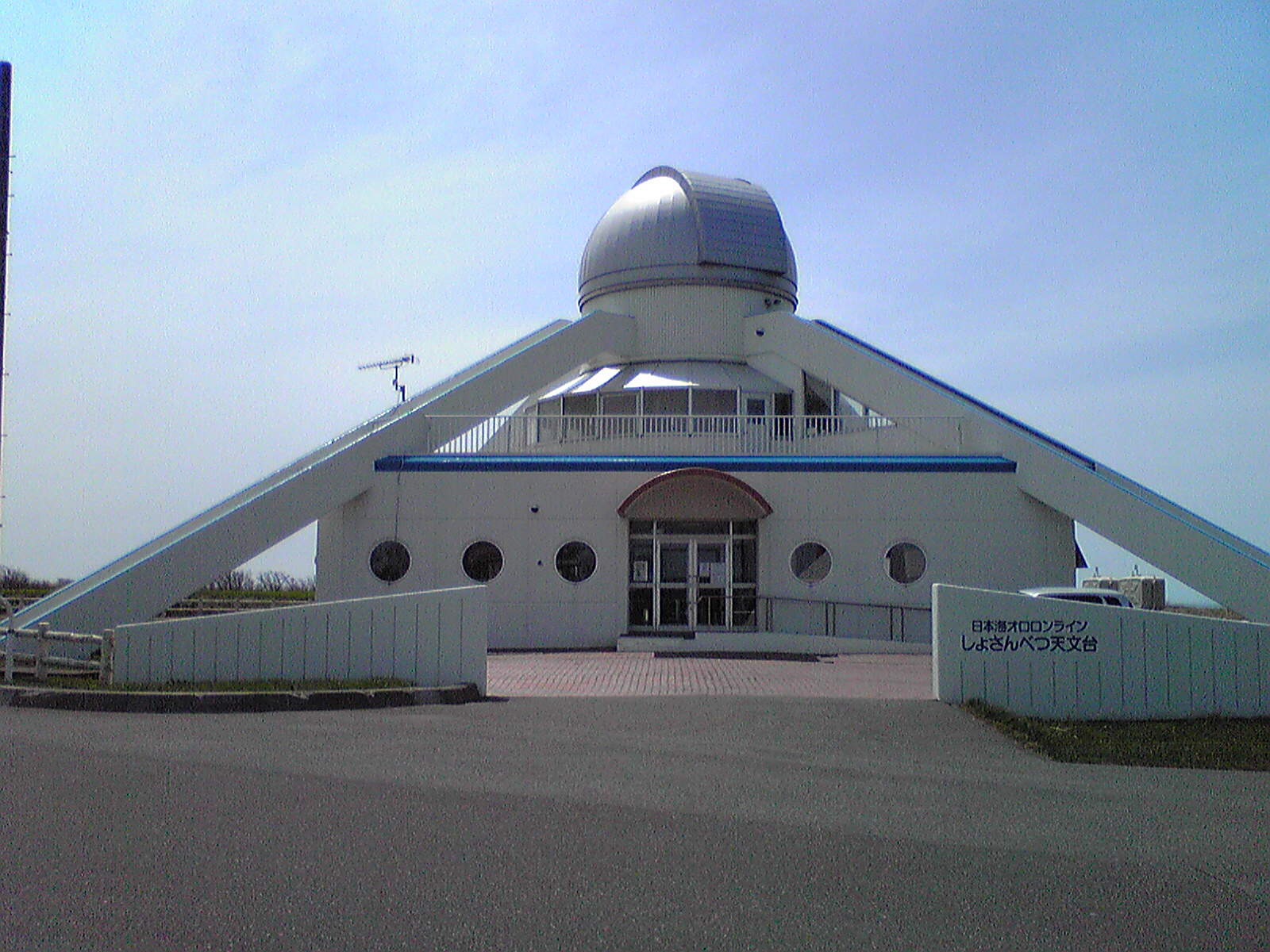
- Location: Shosanbetsu, Hokkaidō
- Coordinates: 44°34′08″N 141°47′08″E
- Altitude: 47 m (154 ft)

Telescopes
- Unnamed: 0.65 m, f/12 reflecting telescope

Shosanbetu Observatory (jp: しょさんべつ天文台, or Shosanbetsu temmondai) is an astronomical observatory in Japan. It is located in the tiny fishermen's village of Shosanbetsu in the northernmost island of Hokkaidō (141°47′08″E, 44°34′08″N, h=47m above sea level) on a cape facing the Sea of Japan.

== Description ==
The observatory is held by the municipal government for scientific education and regular observations, and is open daily to the public (except Tuesdays and winter). It is equipped with a 0.65-meter cassegrain reflector and a few small portable telescopes.

Its surroundings are a seaside park that has a public-run inn with hot spring, field for sports, bathing spot and camp site, and is crowded with tourists on holidays. It is easy to get there by inter-city buses from Sapporo, the capital city of Hokkaido.

Asteroid 6158 Shosanbetsu, discovered by Japanese astronomers Tsuneo Niijima and Takeshi Urata at the Ojima Observatory (887) in 1991, was named for the village and its observatory. The official naming citation was published by the Minor Planet Center on 30 January 2010 (M.P.C. 68445).
