= Mount Santō =

Mountain in Hokkaido, Japan

- 三頭山

Highest point
- Elevation: 1,009.2 m (3,311 ft)
- Listing: List of mountains and hills of Japan by height
- Coordinates: 44°5′29″N 142°5′9″E

Geography
- Location: Hokkaido, Japan
- Parent range: Teshio Mountains
- Topo map(s): Geographical Survey Institute 25000:1 三頭山; 50000:1 名寄

Geology
- Volcanic arc: Kurile Arc

Mount Santō (三頭山, Santō-zan) is the second tallest mountain in the Teshio Mountains. It is located in Horokanai, Hokkaido, Japan.

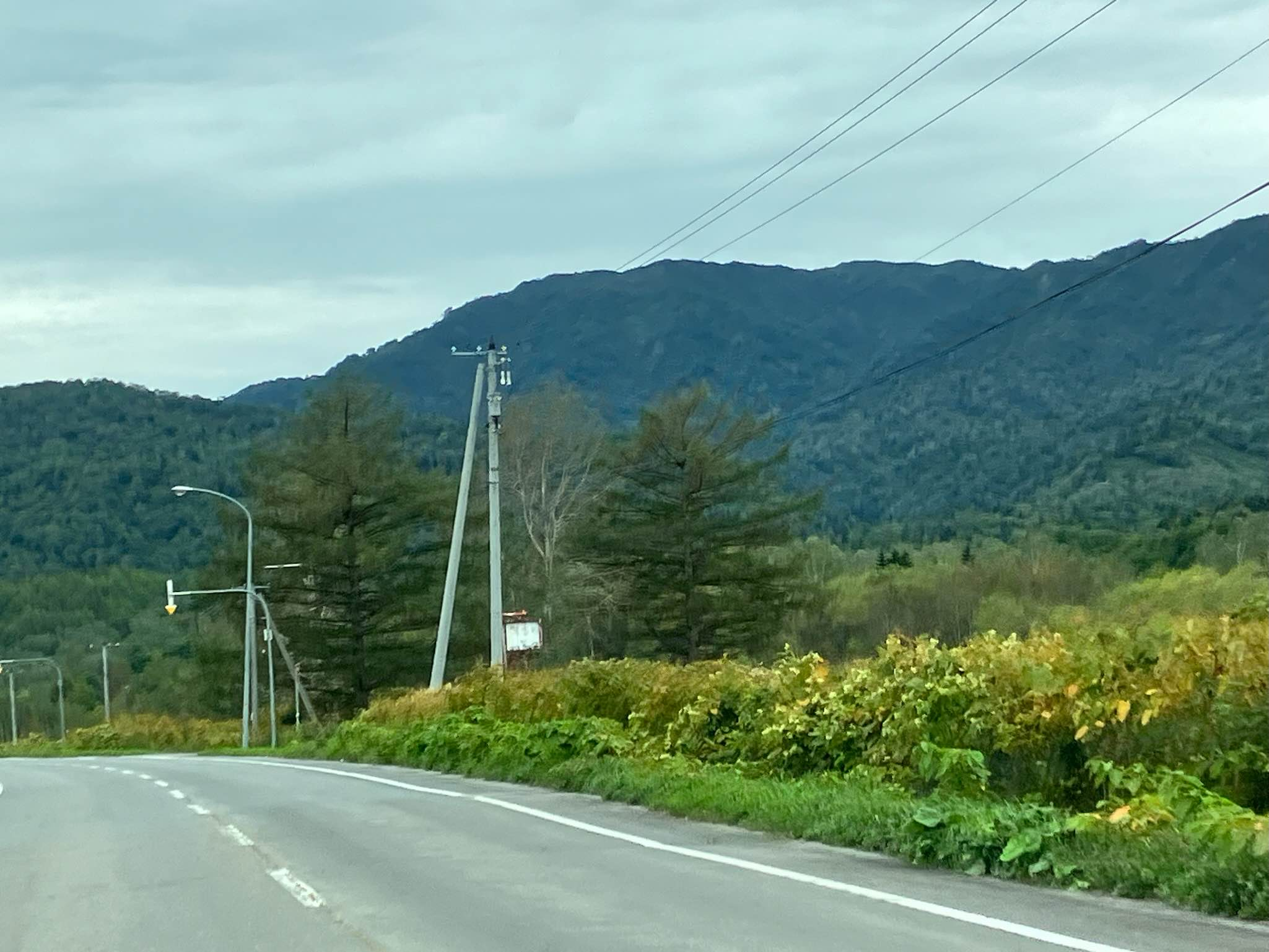
