= Shosanbetsu, Hokkaido =

Shosanbetsu 初山別村
- Village
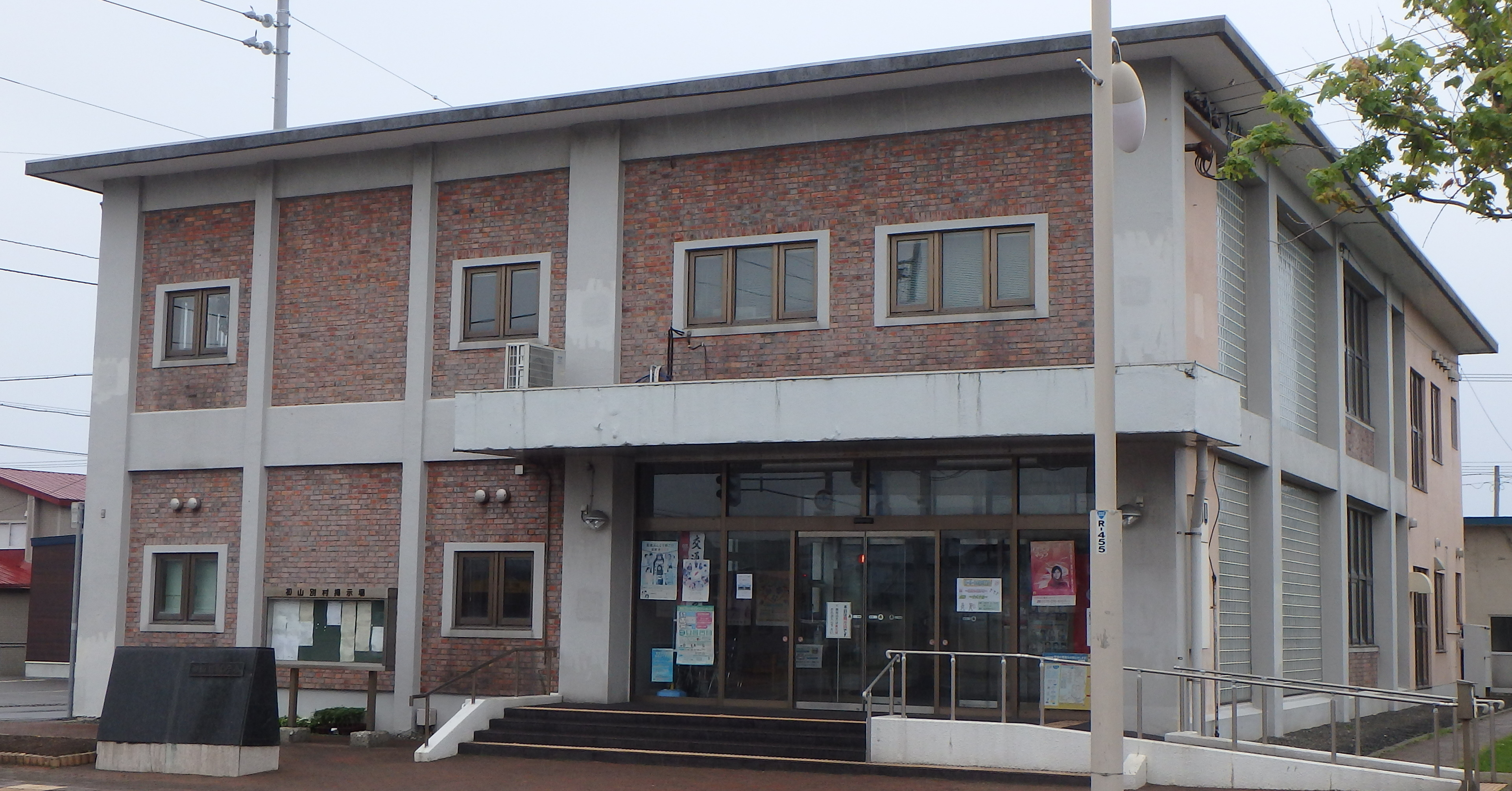
- Shosanbetsu village hall

- Flag Seal
- Location of Shosanbetsu in Hokkaido (Rumoi Subprefecture)

- Location in Japan
- Coordinates: 44°31′56″N 141°45′59″E
- Country: Japan
- Region: Hokkaido
- Prefecture: Hokkaido (Rumoi Subprefecture)
- District: Tomamae

Area
  - Total: 279.52 km^{2} (107.92 sq mi)

Population (January 31, 2025)
  - Total: 1,005
  - Density: 3.595/km^{2} (9.312/sq mi)
- Time zone: UTC+09:00 (JST)
- City hall address: 96-1, Shosanbetsu, Shosanbetsu-mura, Tomamae-gun, Hokkaido 078-4492
- Climate: Dfb
- Website: Official website
- Symbols
- Flower: Azalea
- Tree: Japanese rowan

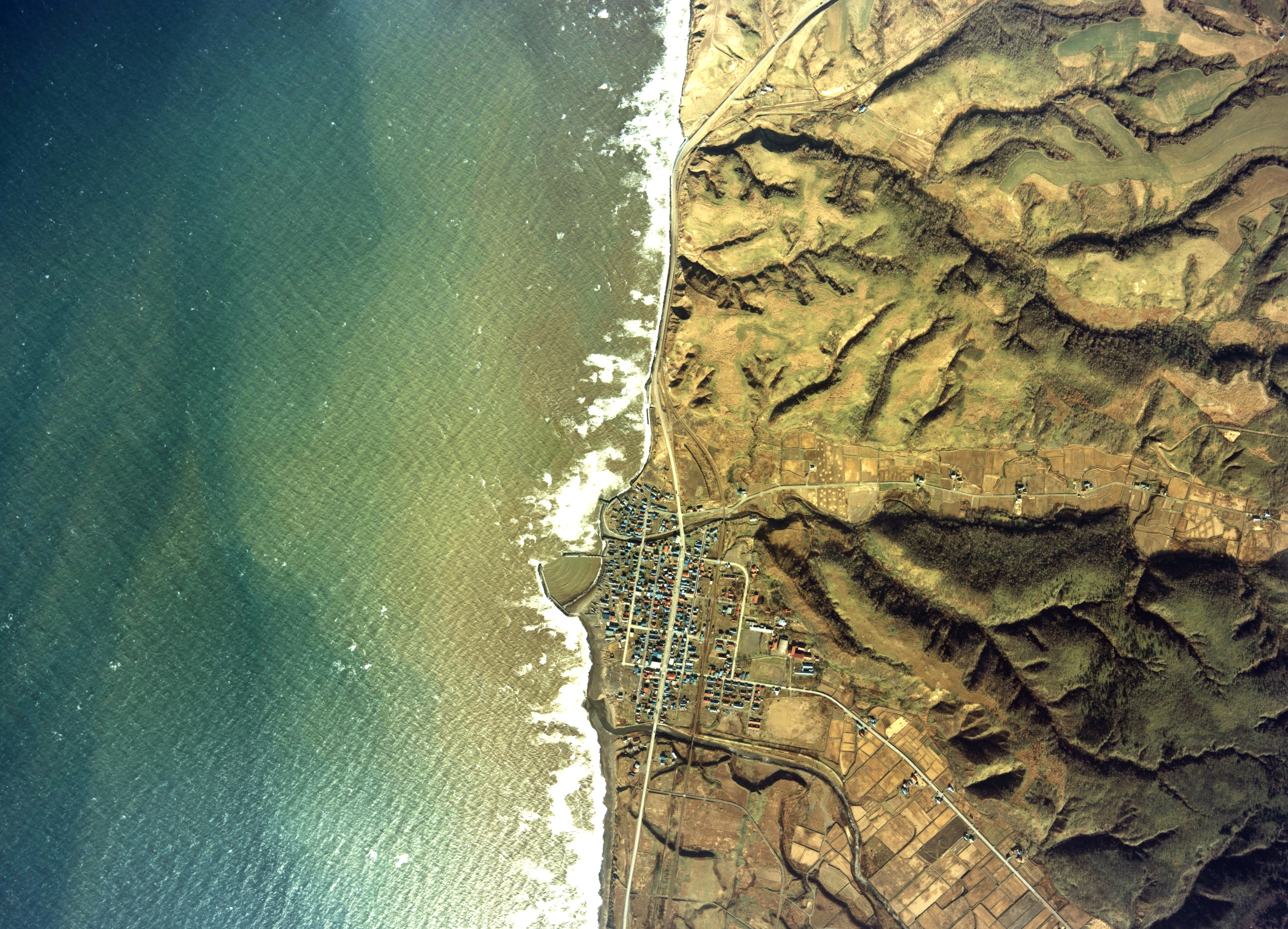
Aerial view of Shosanbetsu urban center

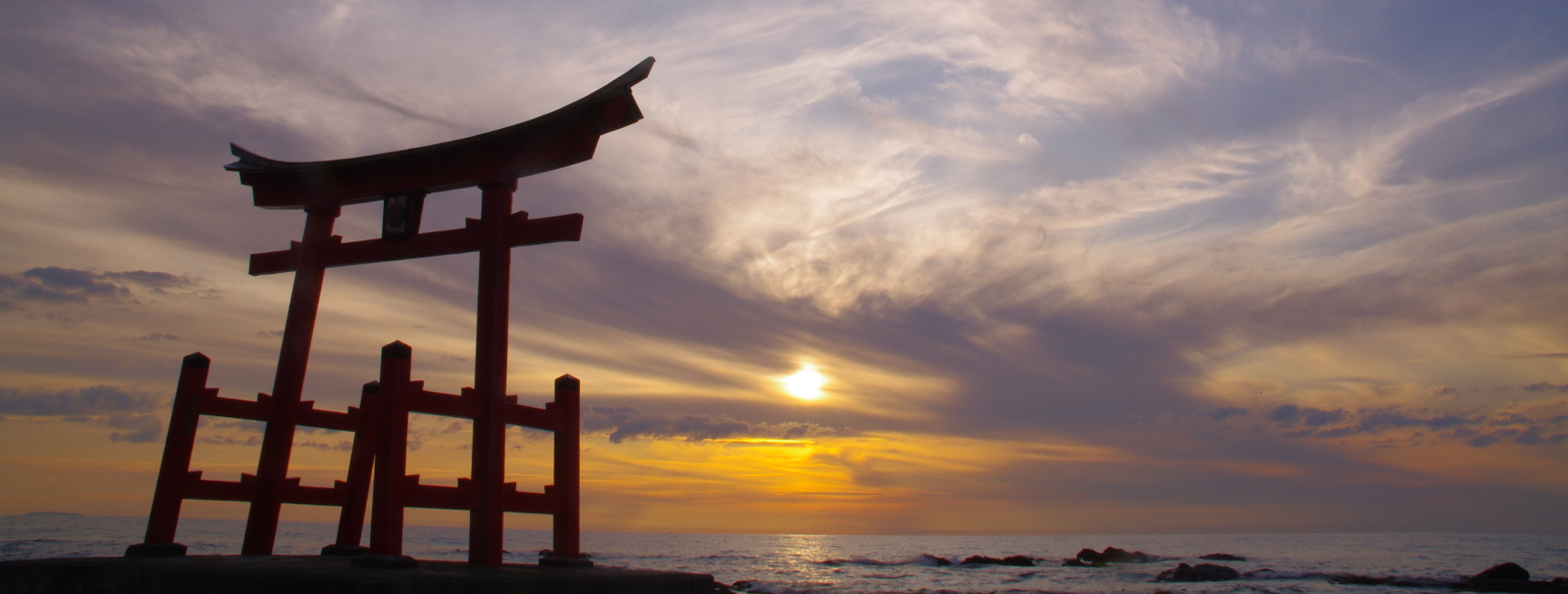
Shosanbetsu Kompira Jinja

Shosanbetsu (初山別村, Shosanbetsu-mura) is a village located in Rumoi Subprefecture, Hokkaido, Japan. As of 31 August 2026, the village had an estimated population of 947 in 478 households, and a population density of 3.6 people per km^{2}. The total area of the village is 279.52 km^{2} (107.92 sq mi).

== Geography ==
Teshio is located in the northern part of Rumoi jurisdiction in northern Hokkaido, on the Sea of Japan coast.

Main rivers: Furenbetsu River, Shosanbetsu River, Mochibetsu River

=== Neighbouring municipalities ===
- Hokkaido
  - Enbetsu
  - Haboro

== Climate ==
Shosanbetsu has a Humid continental climate (Köppen Dfb) characterized by cold summers and cold winters with heavy snowfall. The average annual temperature in Shosanbetsu is 7.1 °C. The average annual rainfall is 1563 mm with September as the wettest month. The temperatures are highest on average in August, at around 20.4 °C, and lowest in January, at around -5.0 °C.

Climate data for Shosanbetsu, elevation 27 m (89 ft), (1991−2020 normals, extremes 1977−present)
Month	Jan	Feb	Mar	Apr	May	Jun	Jul	Aug	Sep	Oct	Nov	Dec	Year
Record high °C (°F)	8.2 (46.8)	11.3 (52.3)	15.4 (59.7)	22.0 (71.6)	27.4 (81.3)	32.8 (91.0)	33.2 (91.8)	33.8 (92.8)	32.0 (89.6)	22.8 (73.0)	19.4 (66.9)	12.3 (54.1)	33.8 (92.8)
Mean daily maximum °C (°F)	−1.5 (29.3)	−1.0 (30.2)	2.7 (36.9)	8.9 (48.0)	15.0 (59.0)	18.9 (66.0)	22.8 (73.0)	24.2 (75.6)	21.2 (70.2)	14.9 (58.8)	7.4 (45.3)	1.0 (33.8)	11.2 (52.2)
Daily mean °C (°F)	−4.6 (23.7)	−4.4 (24.1)	−0.6 (30.9)	5.1 (41.2)	10.6 (51.1)	14.9 (58.8)	19.0 (66.2)	20.2 (68.4)	16.7 (62.1)	10.9 (51.6)	4.2 (39.6)	−1.8 (28.8)	7.5 (45.5)
Mean daily minimum °C (°F)	−8.7 (16.3)	−9.1 (15.6)	−4.8 (23.4)	0.7 (33.3)	5.9 (42.6)	10.8 (51.4)	15.2 (59.4)	16.3 (61.3)	12.1 (53.8)	6.4 (43.5)	0.8 (33.4)	−5.0 (23.0)	3.4 (38.1)
Record low °C (°F)	−25.4 (−13.7)	−27.7 (−17.9)	−24.2 (−11.6)	−8.7 (16.3)	−3.2 (26.2)	−0.3 (31.5)	5.3 (41.5)	5.8 (42.4)	2.3 (36.1)	−3.2 (26.2)	−10.6 (12.9)	−20.8 (−5.4)	−27.7 (−17.9)
Average precipitation mm (inches)	56.7 (2.23)	43.1 (1.70)	46.5 (1.83)	49.2 (1.94)	72.2 (2.84)	64.9 (2.56)	128.8 (5.07)	136.1 (5.36)	135.9 (5.35)	143.6 (5.65)	135.3 (5.33)	87.6 (3.45)	1,109.6 (43.69)
Average snowfall cm (inches)	191 (75)	148 (58)	102 (40)	11 (4.3)	0 (0)	0 (0)	0 (0)	0 (0)	0 (0)	0 (0)	43 (17)	164 (65)	658 (259)
Average extreme snow depth cm (inches)	67 (26)	75 (30)	63 (25)	16 (6.3)	0 (0)	0 (0)	0 (0)	0 (0)	0 (0)	0 (0)	16 (6.3)	47 (19)	81 (32)
Average precipitation days (≥ 1.0 mm)	15.8	12.3	11.2	9.2	10.2	9.0	10.8	10.9	12.2	16.0	17.8	16.9	152.3
Average snowy days (≥ 3.0 cm)	20.3	17.4	14.0	1.4	0	0	0	0	0	0.1	4.9	16.7	74.8
Mean monthly sunshine hours	51.2	75.8	137.3	175.6	199.5	177.3	170.4	177.4	175.5	123.8	52.0	31.4	1,543.9
Source 1: JMA
Source 2: JMA

=== Demographics ===
Per Japanese census data, the population of Shosanbetsu is as shown below. The village is in a long period of sustained population loss.

Historical population
Year	Pop.	±%
1940	3,802	—
1950	5,445	+43.2%
1960	5,167	−5.1%
1970	3,512	−32.0%
1980	2,444	−30.4%
1990	2,057	−15.8%
2000	1,764	−14.2%
2010	1,372	−22.2%
2020	1,080	−21.3%

== History ==
The place name of "Shushabetsu" first appears in historical documentation in 1781. It was established as a village on June 7, 1900.

The village's official interpretation of its name is that it is from the Ainu language "Sousanbetsu (waterfall, flowing river)", but the Hokkaido Ainu Policy Promotion Office's "List of Ainu Place Names" lists it as "so-e-san-pet" (waterfall, flowing river), and also lists the view that it may be "so-san-oet" (waterfall, descending river) based on the description of the place by Matsuura Takeshiro, an explorer from the late Edo and Meiji periods.

== Government ==
Shosanbetsu has a mayor-council form of government with a directly elected mayor and a unicameral village council of eight members. Shosanbetsu, as part of Rumoi sub-prefecture, contributes one member to the Hokkaidō Prefectural Assembly. In terms of national politics, the town is part of the Hokkaidō 10th district of the lower house of the Diet of Japan.

== Economy ==
The local economy of Shosanbetsu is centered on commercial fishing, with puffer fish and octopus noted local specialities. Agriculture and dairy farming are also conducted.

== Education ==
Shosanbetsu has one public elementary school and one public junior high school operated by the village government. The village does not have a high school.

== Transportation ==
=== Railways ===
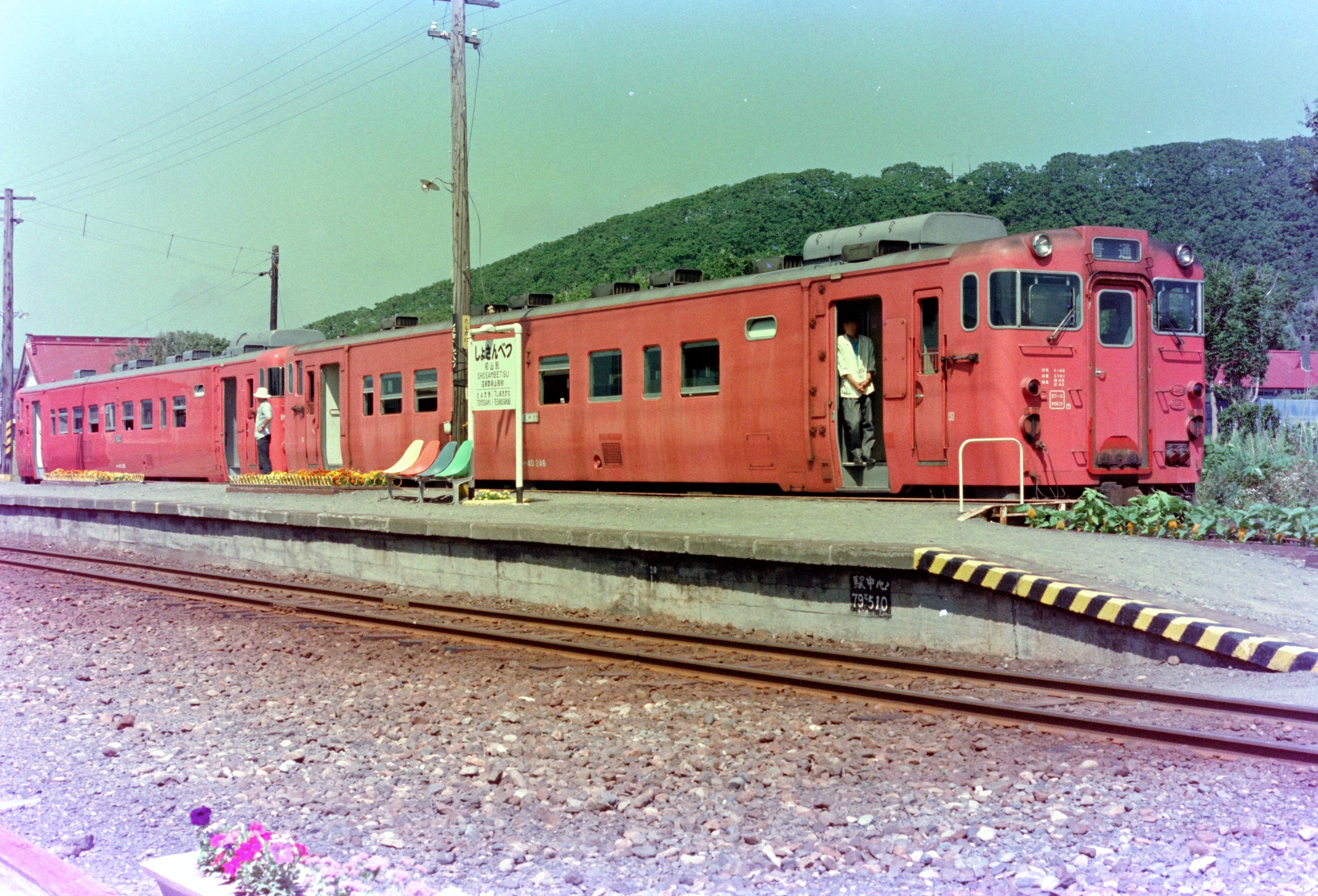
Shosanbetsu station in 1984, 3 years before line closure

After the closure of the Japan National Railway Haboro Line in 1987, the village has not had any passenger rail service. The closest train stations are Horonobe or Onoppunai on the JR Hokkaido Sōya Main Line.

=== Highways ===
- National Route 232

== Local attractions ==
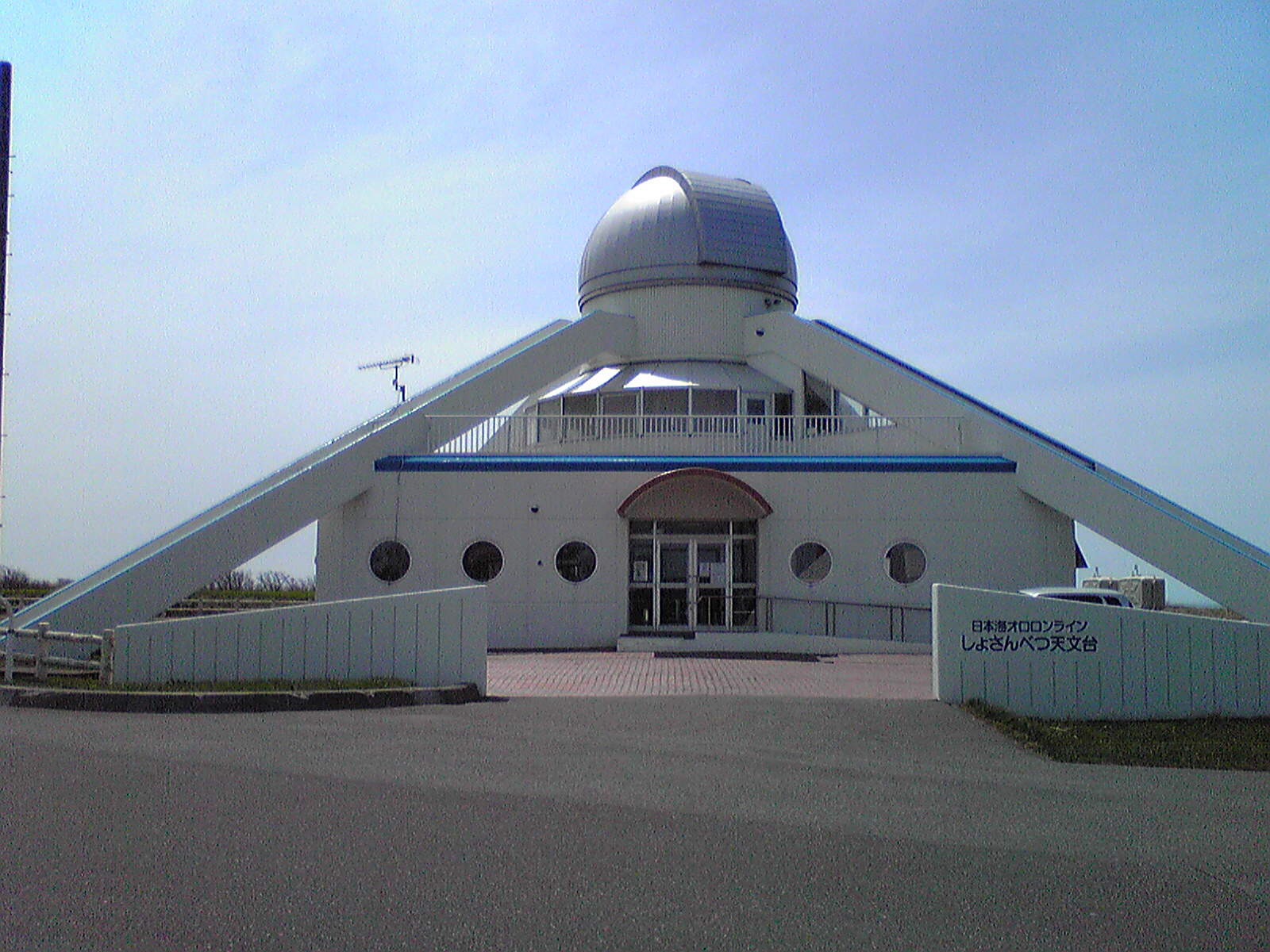
Shosanbetsu observatory

- Shosanbetsu observatory is a planetarium-cum-astronomical observatory which is a popular attraction in this region.

== Noted local residents ==
- Yamamoto Heikichi, famed bear hunter noted in the Sankebetsu brown bear incident.

== Mascot ==
Syosamaru, the village's mascot

Shosanbetsu's mascot is Syosamaru (しょさまる) who is an alien bear. Her ears resemble shooting stars. She wears a helmet that resembles the Shosanbetsu observatory, a necklace made of blue honeysuckle and a pochette that resembles a pufferfish. She was designed by Eiichi Shiozaki of Osaka.
