= Mount Pisshiri =

Mountain in Hokkaido, Japan

- ピッシリ山

Highest point
- Elevation: 1,031.5 m (3,384 ft)
- Listing: List of mountains and hills of Japan by height
- Coordinates: 44°21′20″N 142°1′55″E

Geography
- Location: Hokkaidō, Japan
- Parent range: Teshio Mountains
- Topo map(s): Geographical Survey Institute 25000:1 ピッシリ山; 50000:1 名寄

Geology
- Volcanic arc: Kurile Arc

Mount Pisshiri (ピッシリ山, Pisshiri-zan) is the tallest mountain in the Teshio Mountains. It is located on the border of Haboro and Horokanai, Hokkaidō, Japan.
