= Teshio Mountains =

Highest point
- Peak: Mount Pisshiri
- Elevation: 1,031.5 m (3,384 ft)
- Coordinates: 44°21′20″N 142°1′55″E

Naming
- Native name: 天塩山地 (Japanese); Teshio-sanchi (Japanese)

Geography
- Country: Japan
- State: Hokkaidō
- Regions: Kamikawa Subprefecture; Rumoi Subprefecture; Sorachi Subprefecture; Sōya Subprefecture
- Districts: Esashi District, Hokkaidō; Shibetsu, Hokkaidō; Kamikawa (Teshio) District, Hokkaidō; Nakagawa (Teshio) District, Hokkaidō; Nayoro, Hokkaidō; Rumoi District, Hokkaidō; Sōya District, Hokkaidō; Teshio District, Hokkaidō; Uryū District, Hokkaidō; Rumoi, Hokkaidō
- Municipalities: Bifuka, Hokkaidō; Enbetsu, Hokkaidō; Haboro, Hokkaidō; Hamatonbetsu, Hokkaidō; Horokanai, Hokkaidō; Horonobe, Hokkaidō; Kenbuchi, Hokkaidō; Mashike, Hokkaidō; Nakagawa, Hokkaidō; Nakatonbetsu, Hokkaidō; Numata, Hokkaidō; Obira, Hokkaidō; Otoineppu, Hokkaidō; Sarufutsu, Hokkaidō; Teshio, Hokkaidō; Tomamae, Hokkaidō; Wassamu, Hokkaidō

Geology
- Rock type: Fold (geology)

The Teshio Mountains (天塩山地 Teshio-sanchi) are a mountain range of Hokkaidō, Japan.

== Mountains ==
- Mount Pisshiri
- Mount Santō
