= Tomamae District, Hokkaido =

District in Hokkaido, Japan

Coordinates: 44°18′36″N 141°52′12″E

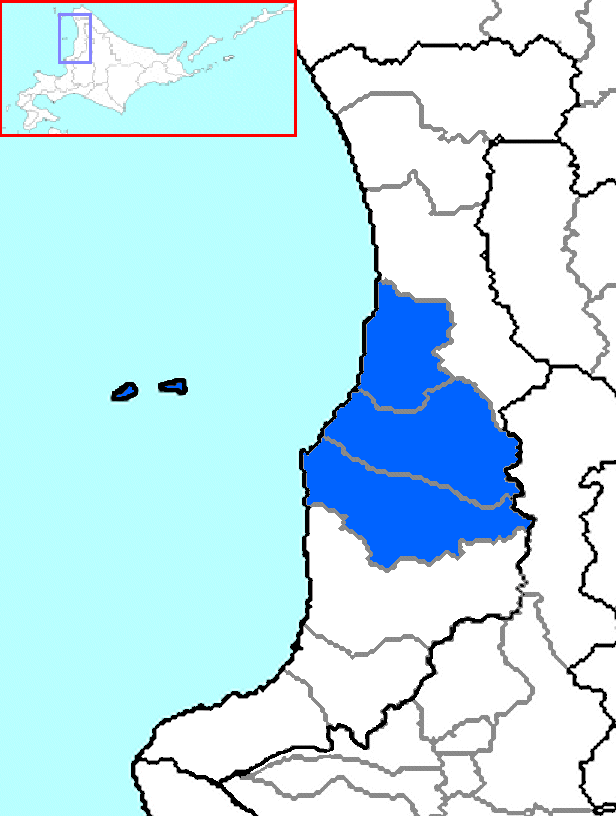
The area of Tomamae District in Rumoi Subprefecture.

Tomamae (苫前郡, Tomamae-gun) is a district located in Rumoi Subprefecture, Hokkaido, Japan.

As of 2004, the district has an estimated population of 14,828 and a density of 12.28 persons per km^{2}. The total area is 1,207.03 km^{2}.

== Towns and villages ==
- Haboro
- Shosanbetsu
- Tomamae
