= Shumombetsu Station =

Former railway station in Mashike, Hokkaido, Japan

Coordinates: 43.8607°N 141.5643°E

Shumombetsu Station 朱文別駅
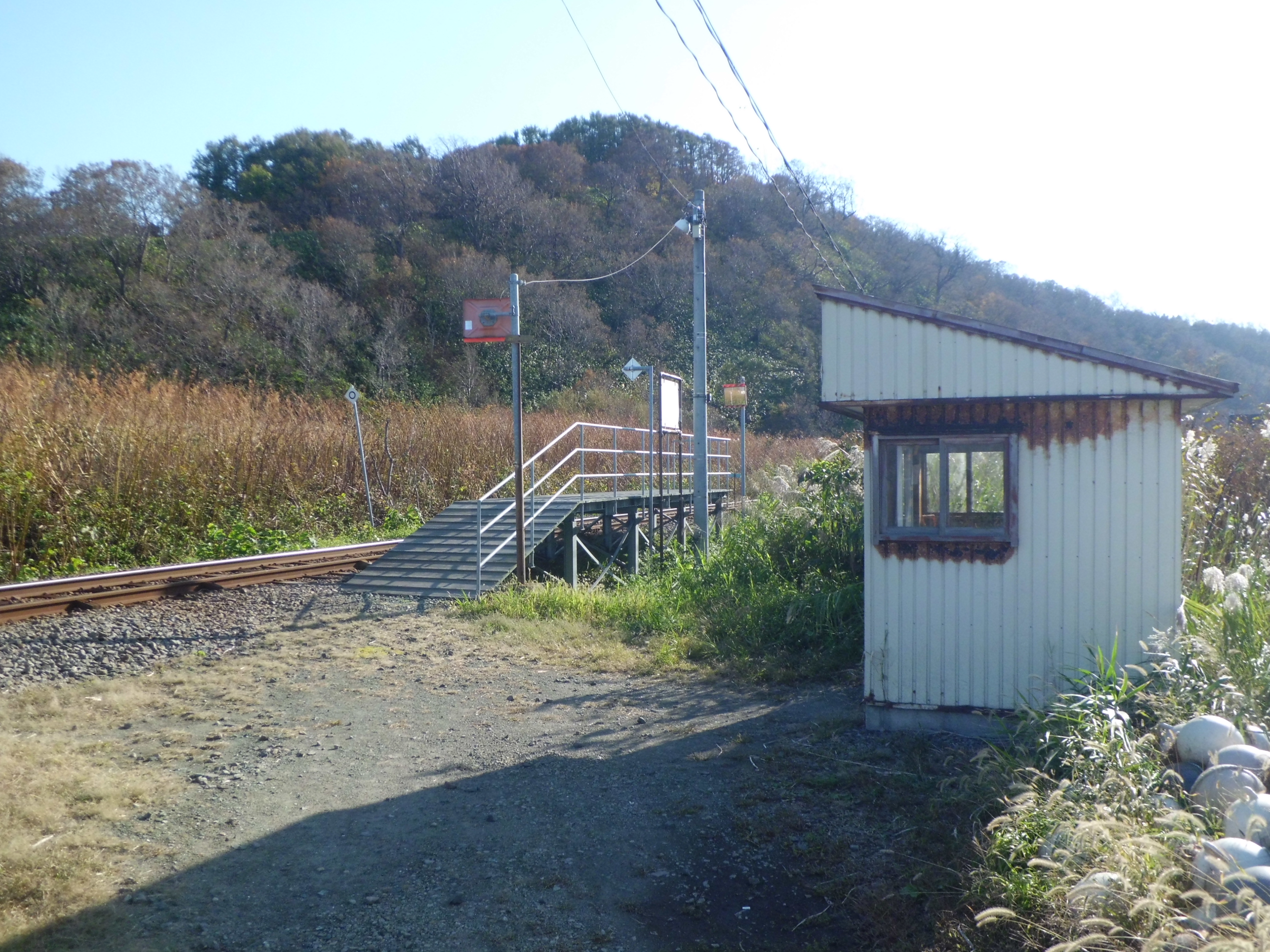
- Shumombetsu Station in October 2016

General information
- Location: Mashike, Hokkaido; Japan
- Elevation: 6 m (20 ft)
- Operator: JR Hokkaido
- Line: ■ Rumoi Main Line
- Distance: 62.7 km from Fukagawa
- Platforms: 1 side platform
- Tracks: 1

Other information
- Status: Closed

History
- Opened: 1 December 1963
- Closed: 4 December 2016
Location
- Location within Japan

Shumombetsu Station (朱文別駅, Shumonbetsu-eki) was a railway station on the Rumoi Main Line in Mashike, Hokkaido, Japan, operated by Hokkaido Railway Company (JR Hokkaido). Opened in 1963, the station closed on 4 December 2016.

== Lines ==
Shumombetsu Station was served by the Rumoi Main Line, and lay 62.7 km from the starting point of the line at Fukagawa. The station was unstaffed.

== Adjacent stations ==
«	Service	»
Rumoi Main Line
Shaguma	Local	Hashibetsu

== History ==
The station opened on 1 December 1963. With the privatization of Japanese National Railways (JNR) on 1 April 1987, the station came under the control of JR Hokkaido.

=== Closure ===
On 10 August 2015, JR Hokkaido announced its plans to close the 16.7 km section of the line beyond Rumoi to Mashike in 2016. In April 2016, it was officially announced that the section from Rumoi to Mashike would be closing in December 2016, with the last services operating on 4 December.

== See also ==
- List of railway stations in Japan
