= Reuke Station =

Former railway station in Rumoi, Hokkaido, Japan

Coordinates: 43°54′17.36″N 141°36′40.31″E

Reuke Station 礼受駅
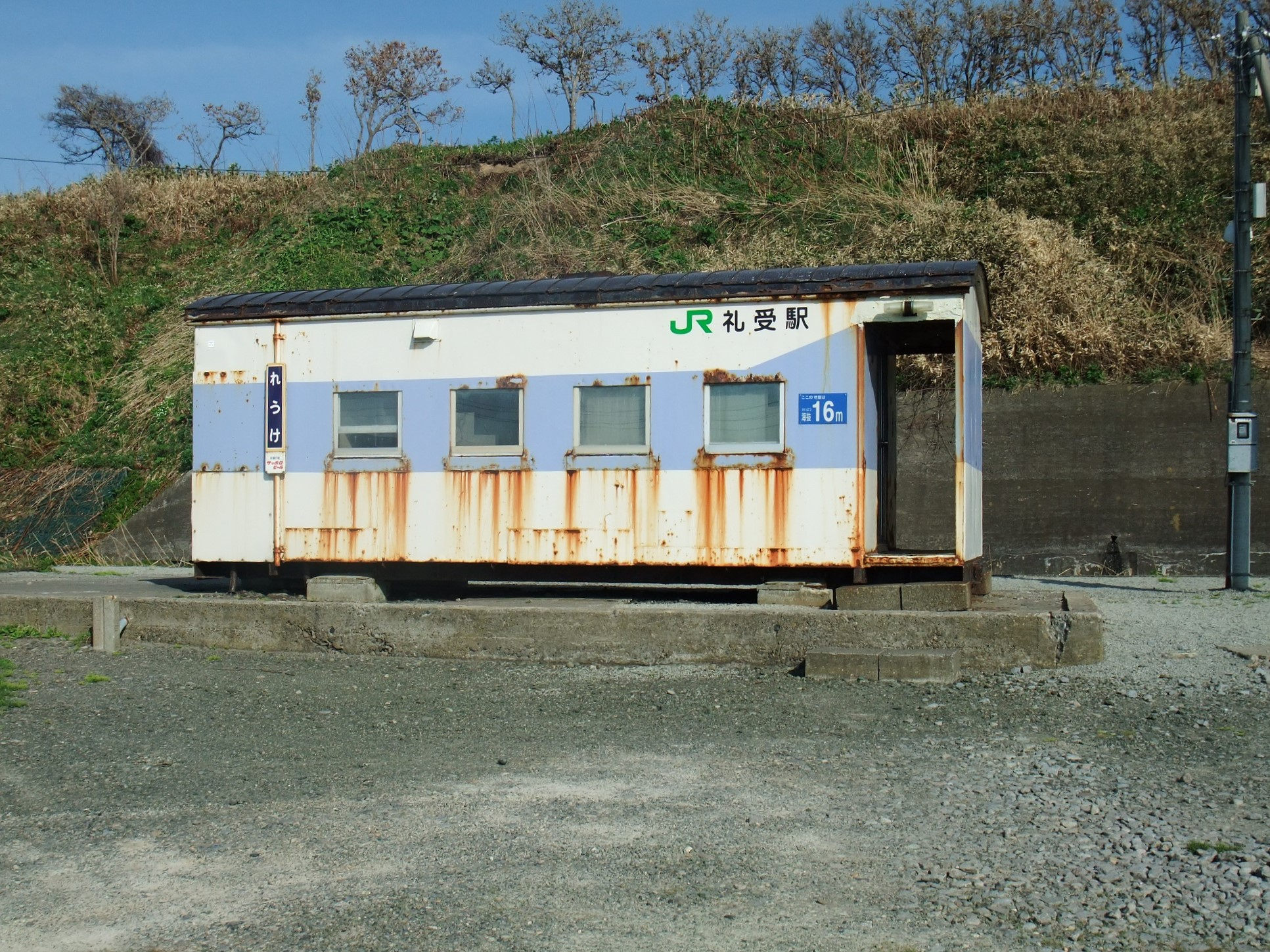
- Reuke Station in May 2015

General information
- Location: Reuke-cho, Rumoi-shi, Hokkaido 077-0035; Japan
- Elevation: 16 m (52 ft)
- Operator: JR Hokkaido
- Line: ■ Rumoi Main Line
- Distance: 56.2 km from Fukagawa
- Platforms: 1 side platform
- Tracks: 1

Other information
- Status: Closed
- Website: www.jrasahi.co.jp/contents/facilities/station/r_reuke.html

History
- Opened: 5 November 1921
- Closed: 4 December 2016
Location
- Location within Japan

Reuke Station (礼受駅, Reuke-eki) was a railway station on the Rumoi Main Line in Rumoi, Hokkaido, Japan, operated by Hokkaido Railway Company (JR Hokkaido). Opened in 1921, the station closed on 4 December 2016.

== Lines ==
Reuke Station was served by the 66.8 km (41.5 mi) Rumoi Main Line between Fukagawa and Mashike, and lay 56.2 km from the starting point of the line at Fukagawa.

== Adjacent stations ==
«	Service	»
Rumoi Main Line
Segoshi	Local	Afun

== History ==
The station opened on 5 November 1921. With the privatization of Japanese National Railways (JNR) on 1 April 1987, the station came under the control of JR Hokkaido.

=== Closure plans ===
On 10 August 2015, JR Hokkaido announced its plans to close the 16.7 km section of the line beyond Rumoi to Mashike in 2016. In April 2016, it was officially announced that the section from Rumoi to Mashike would be closing in December 2016, with the last services operating on 4 December.

== See also ==
- List of railway stations in Japan
