= Segoshi Station =

Former railway station in Rumoi, Hokkaido, Japan

Coordinates: 43°56′7.68″N 141°38′4.89″E

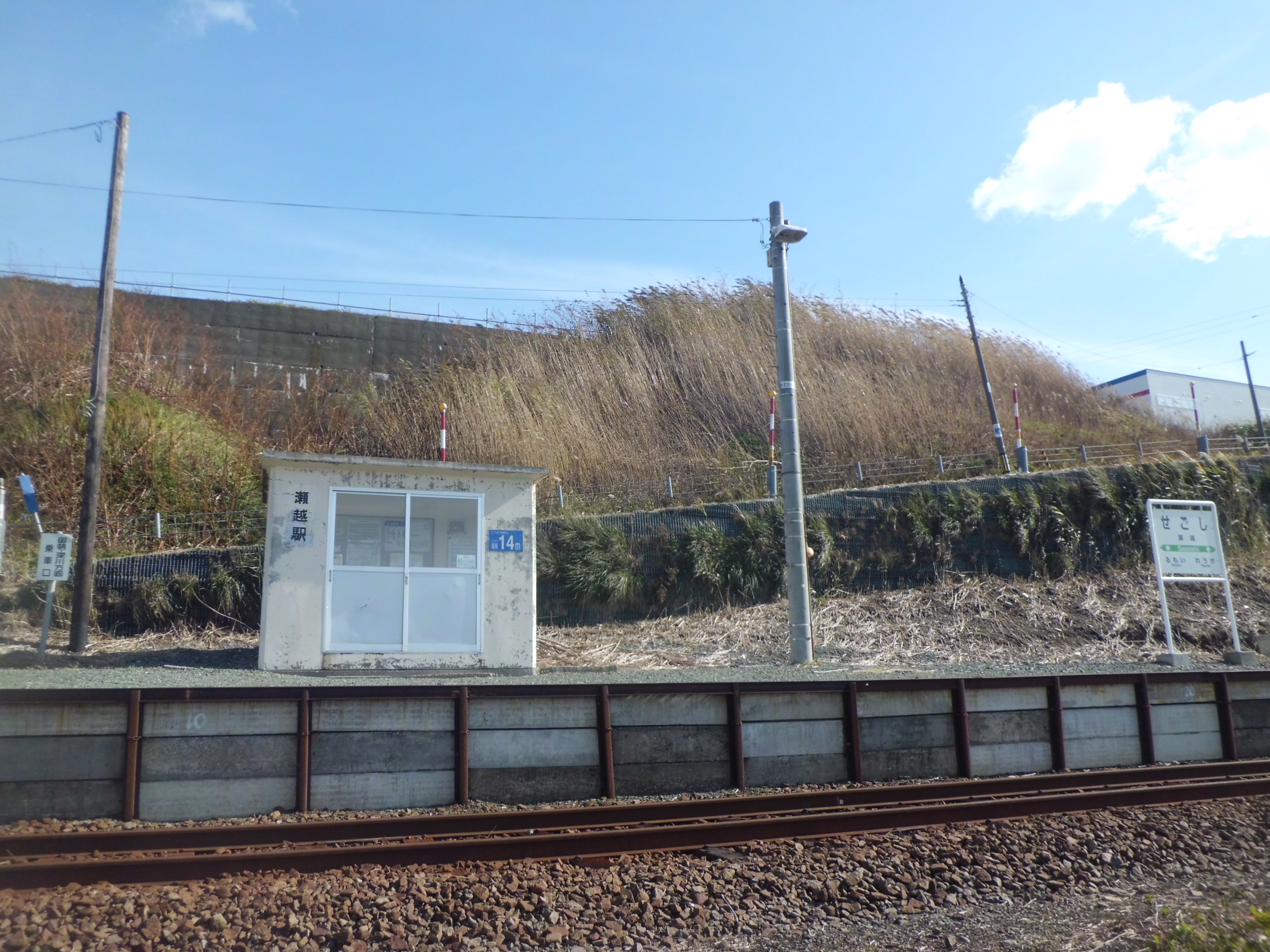
Segoshi Station

Segoshi Station (瀬越駅, Segoshi-eki) was a railway station on the Rumoi Main Line in Rumoi, Hokkaido, Japan, operated by Hokkaido Railway Company (JR Hokkaido). The station closed on 4 December 2016.

== Lines ==
Segoshi Station was served by the Rumoi Main Line.

== Adjacent stations ==
«	Service	»
Rumoi Main Line
Rumoi	Local	Reuke

== History ==
On 10 August 2015, JR Hokkaido announced its plans to close the 16.7 km section of the line beyond Rumoi to Mashike in 2016. In April 2016, it was officially announced that the section from Rumoi to Mashike would be closing in December 2016, with the last services operating on 4 December.

== See also ==
- List of railway stations in Japan
