= Nobusha Station =

Former railway station in Mashike, Hokkaido, Japan

Coordinates: 43°52′24.77″N 141°35′17.29″E

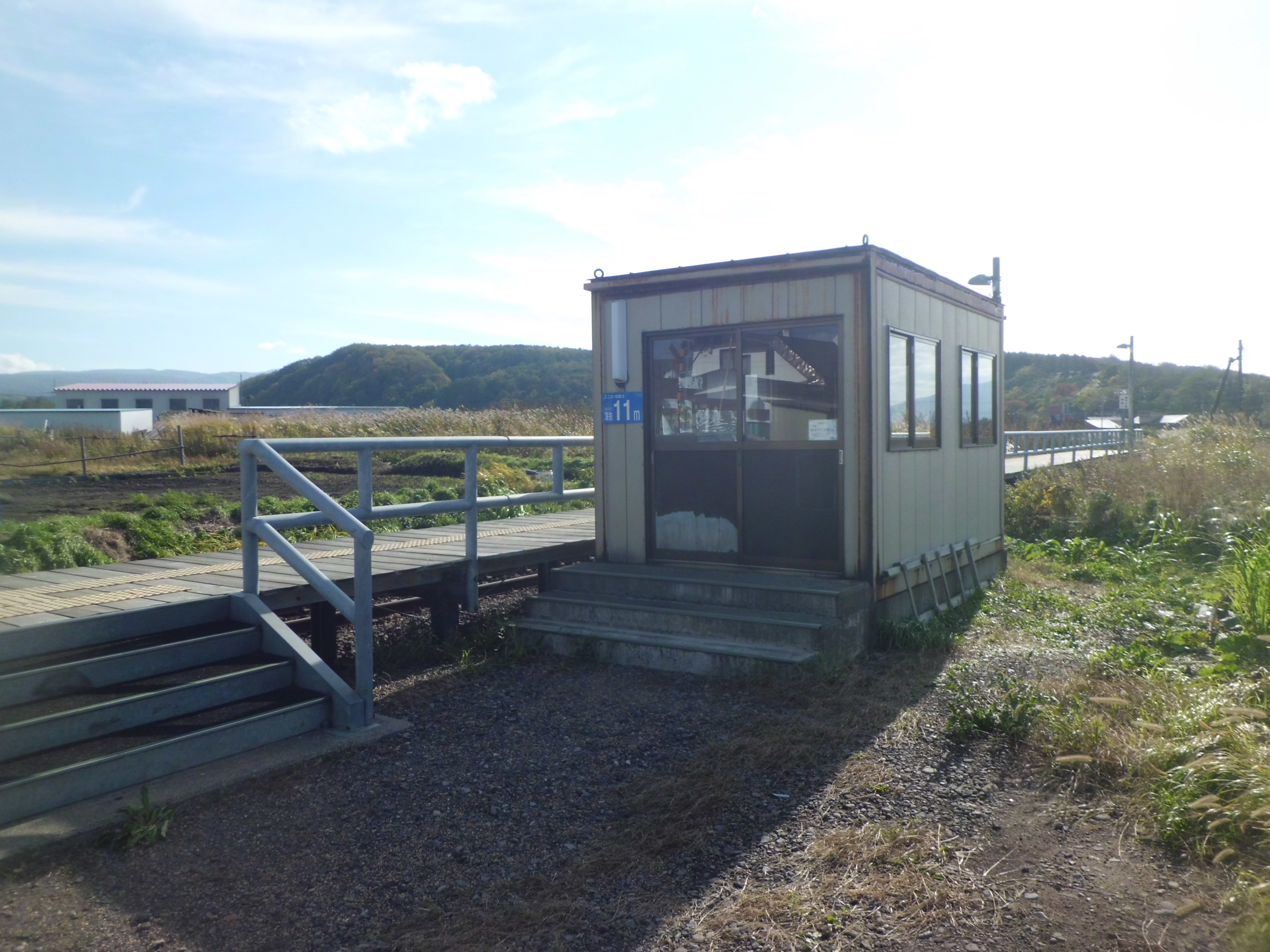
Nobusha Station

Nobusha Station (信砂駅, Nobusha-eki) was a railway station on the Rumoi Main Line in Mashike, Hokkaido, Japan, operated by Hokkaido Railway Company (JR Hokkaido). The station closed on 4 December 2016.

== Lines ==
Nobusha Station was served by the Rumoi Main Line. The station was unstaffed.

== Adjacent stations ==
«	Service	»
Rumoi Main Line
Afun	Local	Shaguma

== History ==
On 10 August 2015, JR Hokkaido announced its plans to close the 16.7 km section of the line beyond Rumoi to Mashike in 2016. In April 2016, it was officially announced that the section from Rumoi to Mashike would be closing in December 2016, with the last services operating on 4 December.

== See also ==
- List of railway stations in Japan
