= Hatanaka =

Hatanaka (written: 畑中 or 畠中) is a Japanese surname. Notable people with the surname include:

- Akiko Hatanaka (畠中 亜希子; born 1975), Japanese ice hockey player
- Bill Hatanaka (born 1954), Canadian football player
- Gregory Hatanaka, American film director
- Jun Hatanaka (畑中 純; 1950–2012), Japanese manga artist
- Kazu Hatanaka (畑中 和), Japanese wheelchair racer
- Kenji Hatanaka (畑中 健二; 1923–1945), Japanese military officer
- Kiyoshi Hatanaka (畑中 清詞; born 1967), Japanese boxer
- Masato Hatanaka (畑中 正人; born 1975), Japanese musician
- Miyuki Hatanaka (畑中 みゆき; born 1975), Japanese freestyle skier
- Shinnosuke Hatanaka (畠中 槙之輔; born 1995), Japanese footballer
- Takeo Hatanaka (畑中 武夫; 1914–1963), Japanese astronomer
- Tasuku Hatanaka (畠中 祐; born 1994), Japanese actor and voice actor
- Yusuke Hatanaka (畑中 勇介; born 1985), Japanese cyclist

== See also ==
- 4051 Hatanaka, a main-belt asteroid
- Hatanaka (crater), a lunar crater
