= Nakatonbetsu, Hokkaido =

Nakatonbetsu 中頓別町
- Town
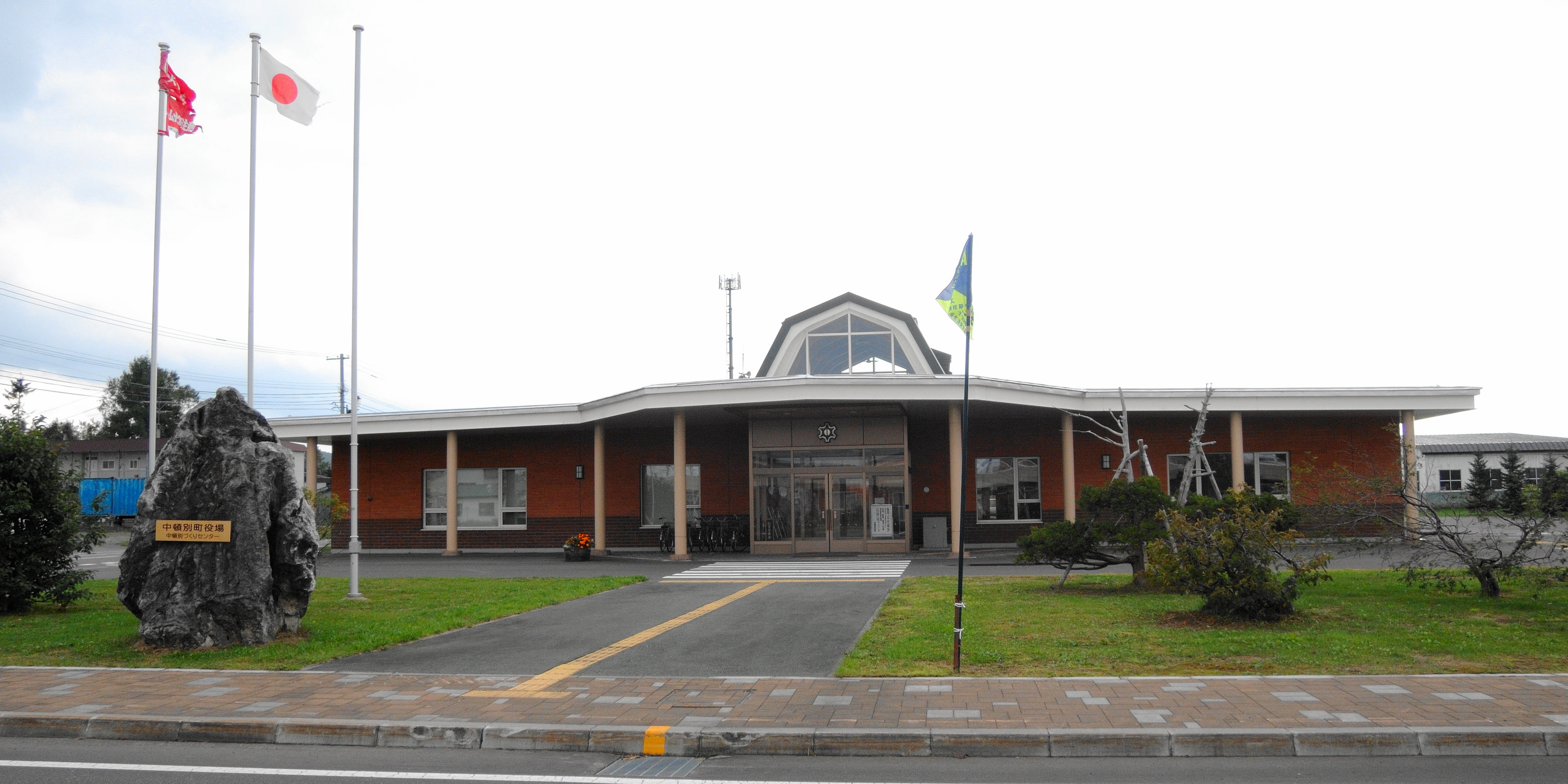
- Nakatonbetsu town hall

- Flag Seal
- Location of Nakatonbetsu in Hokkaido (Sōya Subprefecture)

- Location in Japan
- Coordinates: 44°58′11″N 142°17′12″E
- Country: Japan
- Region: Hokkaido
- Prefecture: Hokkaido (Sōya Subprefecture)
- District: Esashi

Area
  - Total: 398.51 km^{2} (153.87 sq mi)

Population (June 30, 2024)
  - Total: 1,496
  - Density: 3.754/km^{2} (9.723/sq mi)
- Time zone: UTC+09:00 (JST)
- Climate: Dfb
- Website: Official website
- Symbols
- Flower: Kurile Cherry
- Tree: Sakhalin Spruce

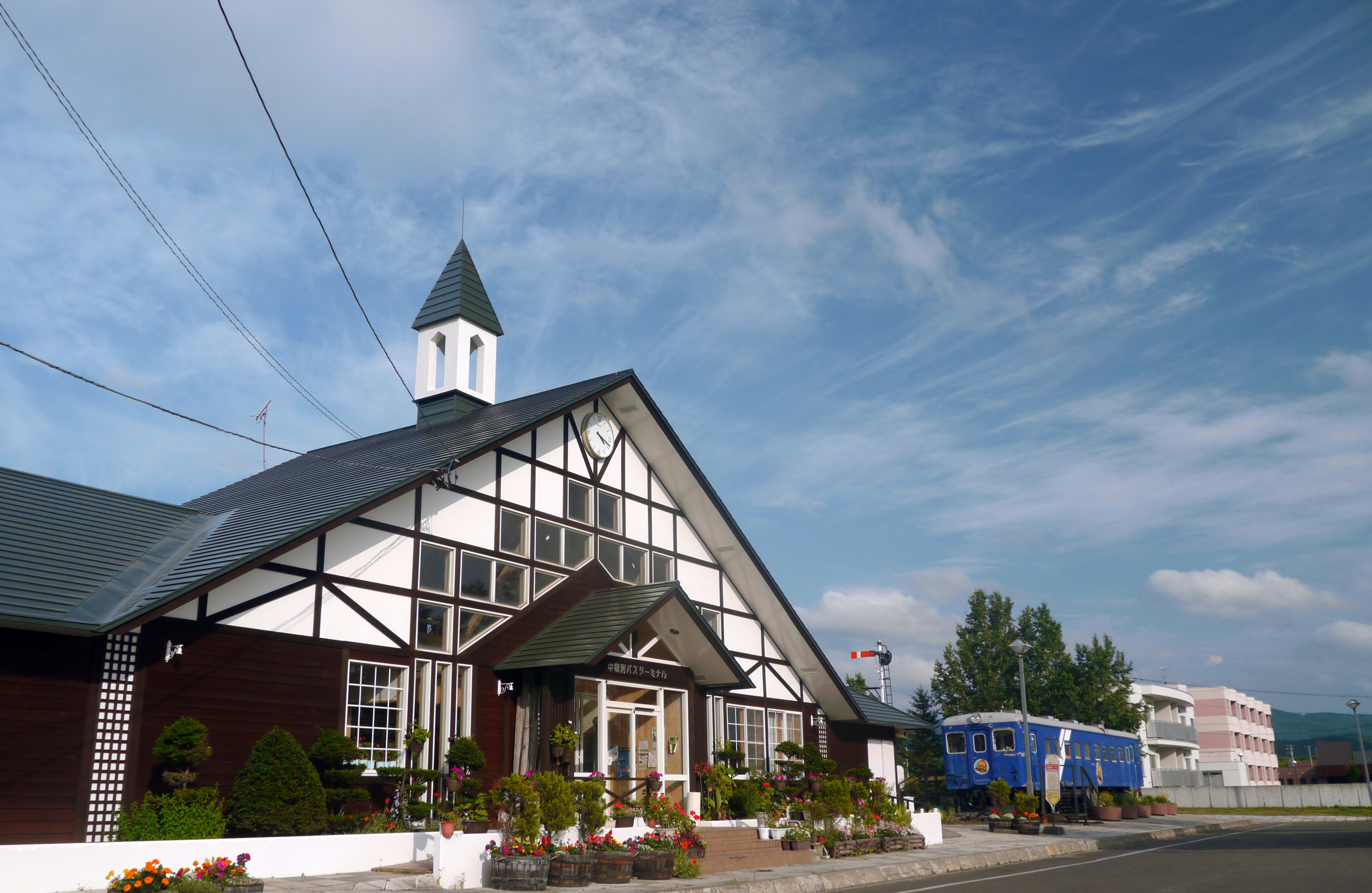
Nakatonbetsu Bus Terminal

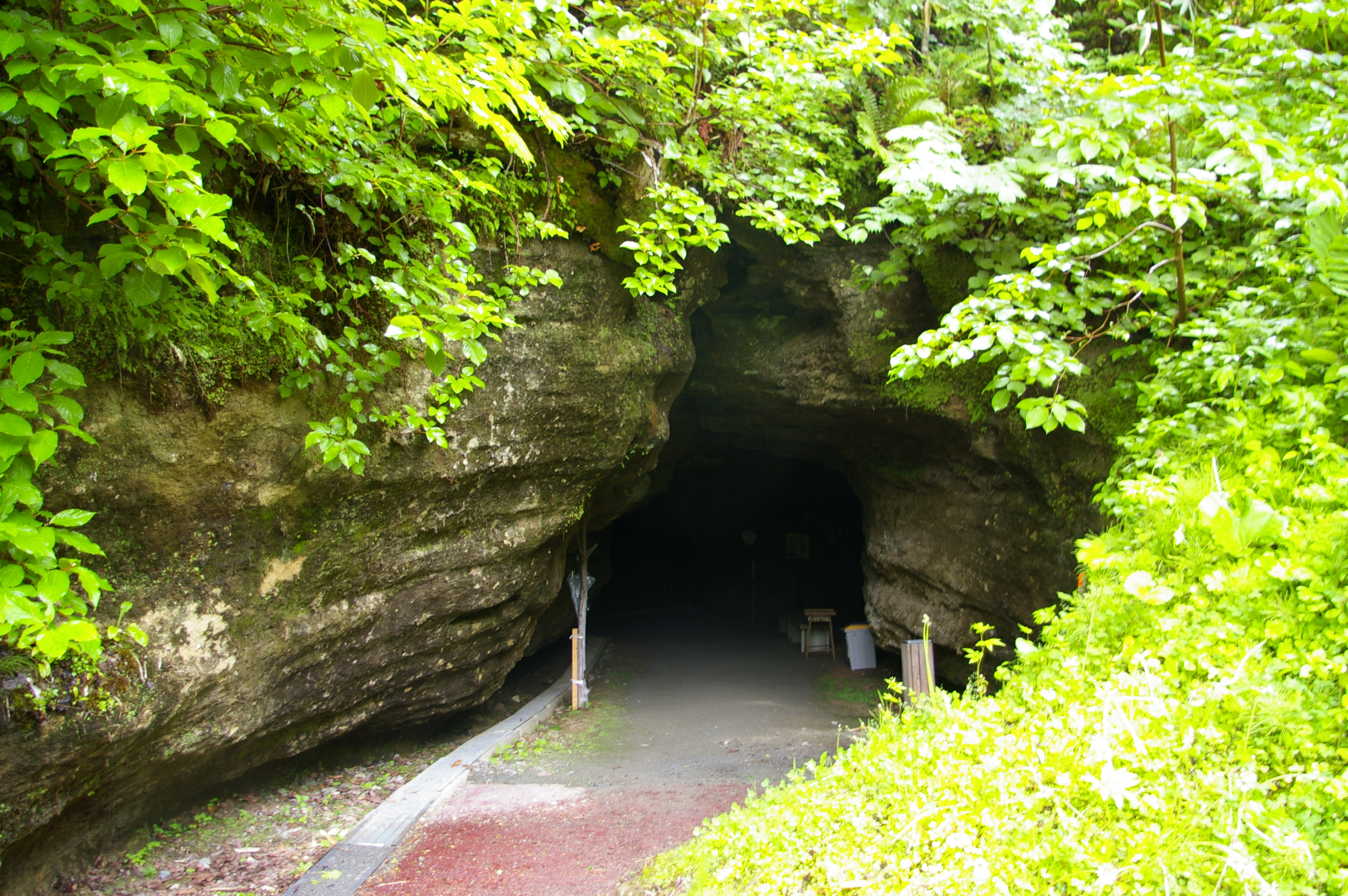
Nakatonbetsu Cave

Nakatonbetsu (中頓別町, Nakatonbetsu-chō) is a town located in Sōya Subprefecture, Hokkaido, Japan. As of 1 July 2024, the town had an estimated population of 1,496 in 834 households, and a population density of 8.1 people per km^{2}. The total area of the town is 398.51 km^{2} (153.87 sq mi).

== Geography ==
Nakatonbetsu is located in northeast Hokkaido in an inland area of the Soya region. It is located in a mountainous area and is surrounded by mountains on all sides. 80% of the town's area is forested.

- Mountains: Mount Polonupuri (841m), Mt. Chikoma (529m), Mt. Panke (632m), Mt. Pinneshiri (704m)
- Rivers: Tonbetsu River, Hiragauchi River, Hyochana River, Ama River, Icchannai River, Sasano River

=== Neighbouring municipalities ===
- Hokkaido
  - Esashi
  - Hamatonbetsu
  - Horonobe
  - Nakagawa
  - Nakatonbetsu
  - Otoineppu

== Climate ==
Nakatonbetsu has cold and temperate climate considered to be Dfb according to the Köppen-Geiger climate classification. There is a considerable amount of rainfall even during months that typically experience dry weather. The average annual temperature in Nakatonbetsu is 5.3 °C. Each year, there is an approximate 1112 mm of precipitation. The temperatures are highest on average in August, at around 19.1 °C, and lowest in January, at around -7.9 °C.

Climate data for Nakatonbetsu, elevation 25 m (82 ft), (1991−2020 normals, extremes 1977−present)
Month	Jan	Feb	Mar	Apr	May	Jun	Jul	Aug	Sep	Oct	Nov	Dec	Year
Record high °C (°F)	7.6 (45.7)	8.7 (47.7)	15.8 (60.4)	24.6 (76.3)	30.9 (87.6)	33.1 (91.6)	35.8 (96.4)	35.8 (96.4)	32.4 (90.3)	25.4 (77.7)	19.7 (67.5)	10.4 (50.7)	35.8 (96.4)
Mean daily maximum °C (°F)	−3.4 (25.9)	−2.5 (27.5)	1.8 (35.2)	8.5 (47.3)	15.8 (60.4)	19.6 (67.3)	23.3 (73.9)	24.4 (75.9)	21.1 (70.0)	14.2 (57.6)	5.5 (41.9)	−1.2 (29.8)	10.6 (51.1)
Daily mean °C (°F)	−8.4 (16.9)	−8.5 (16.7)	−3.2 (26.2)	3.5 (38.3)	9.7 (49.5)	13.8 (56.8)	17.9 (64.2)	19.1 (66.4)	15.0 (59.0)	8.4 (47.1)	1.5 (34.7)	−5.3 (22.5)	5.3 (41.5)
Mean daily minimum °C (°F)	−15.4 (4.3)	−16.7 (1.9)	−10.1 (13.8)	−1.9 (28.6)	3.6 (38.5)	8.4 (47.1)	13.3 (55.9)	14.5 (58.1)	9.3 (48.7)	2.7 (36.9)	−2.8 (27.0)	−10.9 (12.4)	−0.5 (31.1)
Record low °C (°F)	−35.9 (−32.6)	−35.6 (−32.1)	−30.0 (−22.0)	−16.7 (1.9)	−6.3 (20.7)	−2.6 (27.3)	1.9 (35.4)	3.5 (38.3)	−0.6 (30.9)	−7.2 (19.0)	−18.7 (−1.7)	−26.9 (−16.4)	−35.9 (−32.6)
Average precipitation mm (inches)	92.4 (3.64)	66.3 (2.61)	72.2 (2.84)	56.7 (2.23)	68.4 (2.69)	66.6 (2.62)	120.2 (4.73)	145.5 (5.73)	141.8 (5.58)	155.8 (6.13)	152.8 (6.02)	126.1 (4.96)	1,264.7 (49.79)
Average snowfall cm (inches)	219 (86)	172 (68)	136 (54)	41 (16)	2 (0.8)	0 (0)	0 (0)	0 (0)	0 (0)	2 (0.8)	84 (33)	233 (92)	886 (349)
Average extreme snow depth cm (inches)	116 (46)	136 (54)	136 (54)	80 (31)	2 (0.8)	0 (0)	0 (0)	0 (0)	0 (0)	1 (0.4)	29 (11)	82 (32)	145 (57)
Average precipitation days (≥ 1.0 mm)	20.5	16.6	15.9	11.3	10.7	9.4	10.4	11.5	13.7	16.6	20.6	22.4	179.6
Average snowy days (≥ 3.0 cm)	20.8	17.9	14.5	5.5	0.2	0	0	0	0	0.2	8.0	21.4	88.5
Mean monthly sunshine hours	52.3	74.4	116.5	147.3	176.0	156.3	135.9	134.0	154.1	124.3	55.7	33.7	1,356.1
Source 1: JMA
Source 2: JMA

=== Demographics ===
Per Japanese census data, the population of Nakatonbetsu is as shown below. The town is in a long period of sustained population loss.

Historical population
Year	Pop.	±%
1940	6,724	—
1950	7,592	+12.9%
1960	7,375	−2.9%
1970	5,395	−26.8%
1980	4,203	−22.1%
1990	3,056	−27.3%
2000	2,518	−17.6%
2010	1,975	−21.6%
2020	1,637	−17.1%

== History ==
The name of "Tonbetsu" derives from the Ainu language word to-un-pet, which translates "river entering lake", and which referred to the Tonbetsu River which enters Lake Kutcharo. In 1878, the villages of Esashi, Tonbetsu, Utanobetsu, and Rebun were established in Esashi District, Kitami Province. Around 1897, gold dust was discovered in the Tonbetsu River in Nakatonbetsu, leading to a minor gold rush. In 1909 the four villages merged to form the village of Esashi; however, Tonbetsu was separated out in April 1916. In April 1921, Tonbestu was divided into Tonbetsu and Nakatonbetsu villages. Nakatonbetsu was raised to town status on November 1, 1949.

== Government ==
Nakatonbetsu has a mayor-council form of government with a directly elected mayor and a unicameral town council of eight members. Nakatonbetsu, as part of Soya sub-prefecture, contributes one member to the Hokkaido Prefectural Assembly. In terms of national politics, the town is part of the Hokkaido 12th district of the lower house of the Diet of Japan.

== Economy ==
The local economy of Nakatonbetsu is centered on agriculture, forestry and dairy farming.

== Education ==
Nakatonbetsu has four public elementary schools and one public junior high school operated by the town government. The town has one public high school operated by the Hokkaido Board of Education.

== Transportation ==
=== Railways ===
Nakatonbetsu has not had any passenger railway services since the closing of the JR Hokkaido Tempoku Line in 1989. The nearest railway station is Otoineppu Station on the Sōya Main Line, a 1.5 hour bus ride away.

=== Highways ===
- National Route 275
