= Place name origins =

In much of the "Old World" (approximately Africa, Asia and Europe) the names of many places cannot easily be interpreted or understood; they do not convey any apparent meaning in the modern language of the area. This is due to a general set of processes through which place names evolve over time, until their obvious meaning is lost. In contrast, in the "New World" (roughly North America, South America, and Oceania), many place names' origins are known.

Although the origin of many place names is now forgotten, it is often possible to establish likely meanings through consideration of early forms of the name. Some general conclusions about the nature of place names, and the way in which place names change, can be made and are examined below. It is also possible to distinguish regional trends and differences in the naming of places, as is also discussed below.

== Types of place name ==
There are several clearly definable types of place name, the primary division being between the names of natural features and the names of human settlements. That the latter are 'places' is obvious. The case is slightly more ambiguous for natural features, depending on how exactly 'place' is defined, and what exactly the concept of a 'place' is used for. If, as is probable, natural features were originally given names to distinguish nearby hills, streams etc. from each other, then these features can be thought of as places, in that they represent distinct geographic locations. However, as names are applied on a larger scale, they may become less useful as place names.

For instance, a relatively small, distinct upland valley (e.g. Swaledale) clearly represents a definable geographic location. However, the broad, extended valley of a major river, such as the Trent, is not easily understood as a single location. That notwithstanding, it is probable that the origins of the names of both settlements and natural features is the same, namely to distinguish one from another; and thus that both should be considered place names.

Many other types of place name can be defined, for example those relating to tribal or personal names. Previously names relating to pagan religion were extensively studied as these were thought to be early. Another class studied was those relating to particular people, example: the Ancient British.

The place names also can be based upon the nature of the occupation of the people in that area or the particular function performed by the people in that area.

== Toponymic processes ==
There are identifiable processes which occur over time to place names, and which alter the place names in such a way that their original meanings are lost. These apply to both the names of settlements and natural features, although more so to the former.

The processes by which place names change include abbreviation, conflation, convergence, development in the parent language (but stasis in the place name) and replacement of the parent language. The latter in particular can result in dramatic shifts in place names, since the original meaning (and often sounds) are not conveyed in the new language, the place name thus shifts to a form appropriate for the new language.

- Abbreviation tends to break down a name into a more easily pronounced form, e.g.Cantwaraburh to Canterbury; Dornwaracaster to Dorchester; Eborakon (through Eoforwīc and Jorvik) to York.
- Conflation is where two similar elements of place names become confused, for instance the Old English roots den (hill) and don (valley) are conflated in place names e.g. Willesden ('stream hill'), Croydon ('crocus valley').
- Convergence occurs when place names drift towards other familiar phonemes in place names; e.g. in Abingdon (Aebbeduna, 'Aebbe's hill'), the middle sound has converged to the familiar 'ing' found in many place names (usually meaning 'people of').
- Evolution of the parent language may not change a place name by itself; indeed names may show more inertia to change than languages themselves. However, evolution of the parent language permits other processes to occur. For instance, if a name no longer means anything in the modified language, it may drift towards a new form; e.g. Maethelac ('Moot-oak') to Matlock. Or, as the parent language changes, attributes which already form part of a name may be appended to the name. For instance Portsea Island ('Port-island island'); once the meaning of Portsea became obscure, it became necessary to add island.
- Replacement of the parent language is one of the most dramatic processes of change. If, for whatever reason, a new language becomes spoken in the area, a place name may lose all meaning. At its most severe, the name may be completely replaced. However, often the name may be recycled and altered in some way. Typically, this will be in one of the above ways; as the meaning of place-name is forgotten, it becomes changed to a name suitable for the new language. For instance Brittonic Eborakon (perhaps 'place of the yew trees') became Anglo-Saxon Eoforwic ('Boar-town'), then Old Norse Jorvik ('Horse-bay'), and modern English York.
- Elaboration of place names often occurred to make distinctions between similarly named settlements. For instance, in England, two nearby and related settlements often became 'lower/nether' and 'upper/higher'; or 'little' and 'great' (or the equivalent in Latin, parva and magna). Alternatively, two geographically separated places might be distinguished by local features; e.g. Newcastle-under-Lyme and Newcastle upon Tyne; or Newton-le-Willows, Newton-by-Frodsham, Newton under Roseberry (and so on). In England, many additions were made in the medieval period, to show that settlements were ruled by certain families, e.g. as Stoke Mandeville. Some elaborations (particularly in Latin) date back to medieval times, such as Weston-super-Mare ('Weston-on-sea'), while others were added relatively recently, for instance Bognor Regis ('Bognor of the King').
- Backformation: the process whereby names are derived from one another in the opposite direction to that which would be expected - in many cases a river with an obsolete or forgotten name is renamed after a town on its banks rather than vice versa. For example, the river running through Rochdale became known as the 'Roch' through this process. Cambridge perhaps uniquely illustrates both normal and back formation. Originally Grontabricc, a bridge on the Granta, the name became Cantebrugge, and then Cambrigge, from which the river was renamed 'Cam'.

== Problems of interpretation ==
Place names often need specialists to interpret their meanings. Some of the main problems are:

- Language. Sometimes the language used in the formation of a place name is unclear; for example, some names may be plausibly derived from either Old English or Celtic roots. In recent years there has been a tendency to seek Celtic origins for names in England that were previously taken to be Anglo-Saxon.
- Element order. In Germanic languages, and thus in Old English and Old Norse, the substantive element is generally preceded by its modifier, such as "north farm" (Norwich), "Badecca's spring" (Bakewell). In Celtic place names the order is usually reversed with the thing being described (hill, valley, farm, etc.) as the first element, for example "settlement of the Cuebris" (Tregonebris), "mouth of the Dee" (Aberdeen). However, this is not true of all Celtic names, for example "bald hill" (Malvern).
- Translation. The general similarity of Old Norse and Old English meant that the place names in the Danelaw were often simply "norsified". For instance, in Askrigg ('ash (tree) ridge') in Yorkshire, the first element is indubitably the Norse asc (pronounced ask), which could easily represent a "norsification" of the Old English element aesc (pronounced ash) with the same meaning.
- False analogy. Sometimes, however, the place names were changed by new settlers to match pronunciation habits without reference to the original meaning. For example, the Old English name Scipeton ("sheep farm"), which would normally become *Shipton in modern English, instead was altered to Skipton, since Old English sc (pronounced 'sh') was usually cognate with Old Norse sk — thus obscuring the meaning, since the Old Norse word for 'sheep' was entirely different.
- Lost reason. Interpreting some names can be difficult if the reason for the name is no longer evident. Some names originally referred to a specific natural feature such as a river, ford or hill that can no longer be identified. For example, Whichford (Warwickshire) means "the ford of the Hwicce", but the location of the ford is lost.
- Confusion between elements. Pairs of original elements can produce the same element in a modern place name. For example, the Old English elements den (valley) and dun (hill) are sometimes confused, as they can now lack obvious meanings. Croydon is in a valley and Willesden is on a hill.
- Multiple meanings. Some elements, such as wich and wick, can have many meanings. Generally wich/wick/wyke indicates a farm or settlement (e.g. Keswick "cheese farm"). However, some of the sites are of Roman or early Post-Roman origin, in which the wich represents Latin vicus ("place"). These vici seem to have been trading-posts. On the coast, wick is often of Norse origin, meaning "bay" or "inlet" (e.g. Lerwick, Scotland, Runswick, North Riding).

== Names of landscape features ==
The names of natural or man-made features in the landscape tend to be older than those of settlements since the former are often more widely known. Names are given to water features, hills and valleys, islands and marshes, as well as woods and districts. Man-made landscape features that have been given names include roads and trackways as well as burial mounds, etc. Many topographic elements become incorporated into settlement names, together with plant, creature names or personal names. Many topographical words convey not just an image of the place but also a wealth of information about the likely size, status and pattern of farming practiced by the community living there.

Water was of major importance to the early settlers of an area, both for subsistence and for religious reasons. Names were given to springs, streams, rivers and lakes as well as marshes, bays and seas. Eilert Ekwall carried out an early study of river names in England while Krahe conducted a European-wide examination of river names which showed that there were common roots in the names over a wide area. There is still controversy over the language of these roots. Sometimes a generic word was adopted as a specific label, for example the Celtic word for river was afon, which is used in many cases as the name (Avon) of rivers in England.

Land characteristics were important to both hunters and farmers, and there are many terms relating to different types of hills and valleys. Some terms, like cumb and penn, were adopted from Celtic by Anglo-Saxons. Other terms relate to the expansion of farming.

Topographical names were held in low esteem by early place name scholars but their importance was raised in a book by Margaret Gelling, first published in 1978. This discusses the many elements of topographical place names, with updates in 1988 and 1997.

== Names of settlements ==
Most pre-modern settlement names contain a generic element describing the place's function (e.g. 'farm', 'market', 'fort') or a prominent natural feature, or both; if only one of these is present, it is often modified by a personal name or an adjective. For instance, examples from England include:

- Personal name + function + feature - Todmorden - 'Totta's boundary valley'
- Personal name + function - Grimsby - 'Grimr's farm'
- Existing name + function - Exeter - 'River Exe (Roman) fort'
- Function + natural feature - Church Fenton - 'Marsh Farm (with a church)'
- Personal name + natural feature - Barnsley - 'Beorn's clearing'
- Existing name + natural feature - Cockermouth - 'River Cocker mouth'
- Function - Keswick - 'Cheese farm'
- Natural feature - Blackburn - 'Black stream'

These basic elements can also be found in place names in other countries; e.g., Amsterdam ('River Amstel dam'), Liechtenstein ('Light-stone'), Copenhagen (equivalent to “chapmen’s haven”), Paris ('Home of the Parisii'), Shanghai (approximately 'Seaport'), Tashkent ('Stone city'). These elements are also clearly present in the less 'weathered' New World place names - e.g. Fort Knox, Thunder Bay, Little Rock and so on. Carson City, for instance, was named for Kit Carson, and Belo Horizonte means "beautiful view". However, some apparent meanings may be deceptive; New York was not directly named after the English city of York but after the Duke of York, who was the head of the British Navy at the time of the British take-over, and Los Angeles was not named after angels but after the Virgin Mary, or the Queen of the Angels (El Pueblo de Nuestra Señora la Reina de los Angeles).

Countries which have seen repeated large-scale cultural and/or linguistic changes, such as England or France, tend to have more broken down place names, as the original meaning is forgotten and drifts more quickly. They may also have more linguistically diverse place names; for instance in England place names may have Pre-Celtic, Celtic, Roman, Anglo-Saxon, Norse, or Norman-French origins. Conversely, countries with a more uniform cultural and linguistic history tend to have less broken down and diverse place names – Wales for instance (especially when compared to neighbouring England).

== The British Isles ==
Various names have been used for the island of Britain. The origin of place names of the countries within Britain are discussed below. Each country is divided into a number of counties.

=== England ===
Most English place-names are either Anglo-Saxon or Old Norse in origin but Celtic names are to be found over the whole country, most notably in Cornwall (see below) and counties bordering Wales. Other place-names are hybrids of Celtic and Anglo-Saxon elements. There is a high level of personal names within the place names, presumably the names of local landowners at the time of naming. In the north and east, there are many place names of Norse origin; similarly, these contain many personal names. In general, the Anglo-Saxon and Norse place names tend to be rather mundane in origin, the most common types being [personal name + settlement/farm/place] or [type of farm + farm/settlement] (almost all towns ending in -wich, -ton, -ham, -by, -thorpe, -stoke/stock are of these types).

In Shropshire and Herefordshire many Welsh place names are found in the borderlands such as Pontrilas and Trefonen. In Cornwall most place-names are Cornish in origin, whilst in Cumbria there remain a number of place names in Cumbric, the Brythonic language of this region; examples including Carlisle, Helvellyn and Blencathra.

Most old Roman settlements, whether actually inhabited or not, were given the title of -chester/caster in Anglo-Saxon (from the Latin castrum, 'camp' or its plural form castra); the specific names for each may only have little relation to the Roman names (e.g. Chester - 'Deva', Winchester - 'Venta Belgarum' etc.).

Many English places derive part of their name from the river upon which they were built, but in the 16th century many English rivers were renamed with back-formations from towns on their banks. Cambridge, perhaps uniquely, illustrates both effects: originally Grontabricc, a bridge on the Granta, the name became Cantebruge and then Cambrugge, from which the river was renamed Cam. The scholars of Oxford renamed the upper course of the River Thames running through Oxford to Dorchester-on-Thames as the "Isis", owing to an incorrect assumption that the Latin name of the river, Tamesis, represented a combination of "Thame" (a river that joins the Thames at Dorchester) and "Isis".

One place in Yorkshire which retains Celtic toponymy is Pen-y-ghent (one of the Yorkshire Three Peaks), whose name means Hill-by-the-Border in Cumbric, a Brittonic language.

=== Wales ===
The vast majority of place names in Wales are Welsh by origin, containing elements such as Llan-, Aber-, Pen- etc. Along the south coast of Wales, where English has historically been more widely spoken, many place names are commonly anglicized, such as Pontypool, derived from Pont-y-Pŵl. Many places throughout Wales have alternative names in English unrelated to the name in Welsh, for example, Newport (where the Welsh name Casnewydd means "New Castle") and Swansea (derived from the Norse meaning "Svein's island") for the Welsh Abertawe (Mouth of the River Tawe). In some cases these are in fact related to their Welsh name, but disguised through linguistic processes of consonant mutation, for example Monmouth and the Welsh Trefynwy both referring to the River Monnow (Mon- < Monnow < Mynwy > -fynwy).

Welsh place names tend to be associated with natural features rather than people, hence elements describing rivers, hills and valleys are common. The exceptions are places with the prefix Llan, meaning 'Church', which often contain the name of the Saint the church is dedicated to, e.g. Llansantffraid - 'Church of St. Bridget'.

=== Scotland ===
In the islands of Scotland, particularly Orkney and Shetland, but also the Western Isles, there are many names of Norse origin; this is also true on Caithness and other coasts of the mainland.

In the Highlands, the names are primarily in Scottish Gaelic, with emphasis on natural features; elements such as Glen- (valley) and Inver- (confluence, mouth) are common. These have replaced Pictish names that still occur on the east coast.

In lowland Scotland, names are of more diverse origin. Many are Gaelic, but many are also from the Brythonic branch of Celtic languages (such as Ayr). There are also place names from Old English and Scots, such as Edinburgh.

=== Isle of Man ===
Most place-names in the Isle of Man are of Gaelic or Norse origin, but there are traces of an earlier language in some names.

=== Channel Islands ===
Most place names in the Channel Islands derive from Norman-French.

=== Ireland ===
The vast majority of placenames in Ireland are anglicizations (adaptations to English phonology) of Irish language names. However, some names come directly from the English language or Scots language, and a handful come from Old Norse.

== North America ==
=== United States of America ===
Place names in the United States are often taken from the European nation that first colonized the land. Many names that have been transferred from Britain, as is the case with Barnstable, Massachusetts and Danbury, Connecticut. Many others are of French origin, such as Detroit, Michigan, which was established along the banks of the river they called le détroit du lac Érié, meaning the strait of Lake Erie. Many in the former New Netherland colony are of Dutch origin, such as Harlem, Brooklyn, and Rhode Island. Many place names are taken from the languages of native peoples. Specific (personal or animal) names and general words or phrases are used, sometimes translated and sometimes not.

A great many names that appear to be Native American in origin were created by non-Natives with at best a rudimentary grasp of native languages. Pasadena, California's early Anglo residents, looking for a pleasant sounding (euphonious) name for the town, used the Ojibwe word pa-sa-de-na, which means of the valley. Similarly, Negaunee, Michigan's name is derived from the Ojibwe word nigani meaning foremost, in advance, leading, which was determined to be the closest Ojibwe approximation to the English word pioneer.

Nine counties in the U.S. state of Michigan have names invented by Henry Schoolcraft, usually adapted from parts of Native American words, but sometimes having parts from Greek, Arabic and Latin roots. (see List of counties in Michigan.) In some cases the native meanings of a place name are wholly lost, despite guesses and theories, for example Tampa and Oregon.

Place names in the United States tend to be more easily traceable to their origins, such as towns simply named after the founder or an important politician of the time, with no alterations except a simple suffix, like -town. Carson City, for instance, was named for Kit Carson. In the 21st century, real estate developers often conduct historical research in order to craft a name for a modern development that connects to the local history of the community.

=== Canada ===
French‑, English‑, Latin‑ and Gaelic-derived names occur in Canada. The city of Brooks in Alberta is named for Noel Edgell Brooks, after being chosen through a contest in 1904. The city of Calgary has Scottish-Gaelic origins, and the city of Lacombe has French origins. There are also place names with indigenous origins, such as in the city of Wetaskiwin. Places in Canada's territories (Nunavut, Northwest Territories, and Yukon) often have two distinct names: their name in the town's Indigenous language (such as the many existing dialects of Inuktitut), which is often a literal description of the area's features (such as Kangiqtiniq, literally meaning 'deep inlet') and names created by non-indigenous settlers in the area (Kangiqtiniq's being Rankin Inlet, after Lt. John Rankin of the British Royal Navy), which often refer to specific people.

== Place name origins in Oceania ==
=== Australia ===
Australian place names are mainly a mixture of Indigenous and British-derived toponyms. The name of Bindi Bindi, a small town, is reduplicated from an aboriginal language, and the name of the suburb of Yanchep was adapted from the name given to the area by the indigenous Noongar people.

=== New Zealand ===
New Zealand place names derive mostly from Māori and from British sources, and words such as motu, moana, and puke are commonly used in Māori place names. The Māori named most of New Zealand's natural features. When Europeans began arriving in New Zealand from the 17th century, they gave their own names to many geographical features and settlements, often after places in Britain or important settlers or famous British people. Recently, there has been a movement to revive some Māori names.

== Place name origins in Asia ==
=== Japan ===
Place names in mainland Japan have varied over time and include words that reference geographical features, general location, and more. In Hokkaido, many place names originate from the Ainu language, as when the mainland Japanese colonized Hokkaido in the Edo and Meiji period, they transcribed Ainu place names using kanji chosen solely for their pronunciation. The place name Esashi comes from the Ainu word es a us i, meaning "cape". Common Ainu elements in Hokkaido place names include:

Ainu original		Japanese transcription			Example placenames			Sources
Term	Meaning	Romaji	Kanji	Meaning of kanji	Japanese name	Ainu origin	Original meaning	Sources
pet	river	betsu	別	separate	Memanbetsu	meman pet	Cool river	
pet	river	betsu	別	separate	Monbetsu	mo pet	Quiet river	
ota	sand	uta	歌	song	Utanobori	ota nupuri	Sandy mountain	
ota	sand	uta	歌	song	Utashinai	ota us nay	River with a sandy beach	
nay	river	nai	内	inside	Wakkanai	yam wakka nay	Cold-water river	
nay	river	nai	内	inside	Horokanai	horka nay	River that goes back	
poro	large, many, much	horo, -poro	幌	canopy, horo (cloak)	Sapporo	sat poro pet	Dry, great river	
poro	large, many, much	horo, -poro	幌	canopy, horo (cloak)	Bihoro	pe poro	Much water	
sir	place, island, mountain	shiri	尻	buttocks	Okushiri	i kus un sir	Island over there	
sir	place, island, mountain	shiri	尻	buttocks	Rishiri	ri sir	Tall island	

For numerous occasions, the Okinawa-based kingdom of Ryūkyū referred to their island as Okinawa. The Yarazamori Gusuku Inscription (1554) associates Okinawa (おきなは) with the earth under the king (天下), and the Omoro Sōshi, a compilation of archaic ritual songs, contains a dozen songs referring to Okinawa (おきなわ and おきにや).
