= Esashi, Hokkaidō =

Esashi is the name of two towns in Hokkaidō.

- Esashi, Hokkaidō (Sōya) (枝幸町) in Sōya Subprefecture
- Esashi, Hokkaidō (Hiyama) (江差町) in Hiyama Subprefecture
