= Tempoku Line =

Railway line in Japan

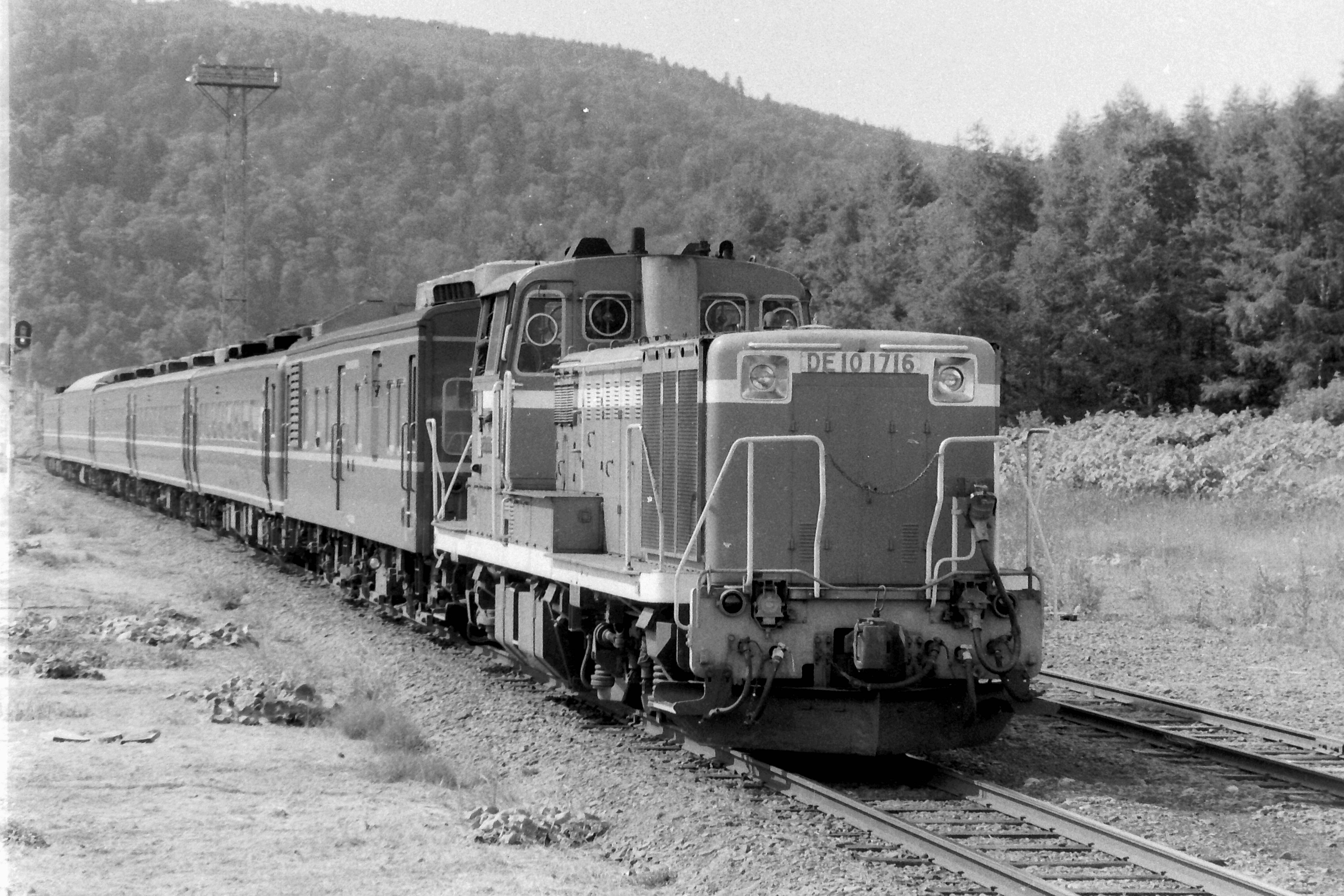
- The express train "Tenpoku" entering Otoineppu Station (July 1988)

Overview
- Owner: JR Hokkaido
- Locale: Hokkaido
- Termini: Otoineppu; Minami-Wakkanai
- Stations: 30

History
- Opened: 1914
- Closed: 1989

Technical
- Line length: 148.9 km (92.5 mi)
- Track gauge: 1,067 mm (3 ft 6 in)
- Electrification: Not electrified
Route map

The Tempoku Line (天北線, Tempoku-sen) was a railway line most recently operated by Hokkaido Railway Company (JR Hokkaido) in Hokkaidō, Japan. The 148.9 kilometres line connected from Otoineppu to Minami-Wakkanai via Nakatonbetsu, Hamatonbetsu and Sarufutsu until its closure in 1989. This railway line was named after Teshio Province and Kitami Province.

== Naming ==
The line got its name to the two former provinces that it went through: Teshio (天塩) and Kitami (北見). The first character of Teshio (天) can also be read as "ten", and the first character of Kitami (北) can also be read as "hoku". By Japanese orthography, putting "ten" and "hoku" together makes "Tempoku".

== History ==
The first section from Otoineppu to Shō-Tombetsu was opened in 1914. All section was opened in 1922, as the first railway line for Wakkanai. In 1926, Teshio line via Horonobe was opened. From Otoineppu to Wakkanai, the distance of this line was longer than Teshio line. In 1930, Teshio line was integrated into Sōya Main Line, and this line was separated from it and renamed Kitami line.

In 1961, Kitami line was renamed to Tempoku line. In 1987, JNR was privatized, and this line was inherited by JR Hokkaido, but abandoned on 1 May 1989.

== Stations ==
Station		Distance (km)	Connections	Location
Otoineppu	音威子府	0.0	Sōya Main Line	Otoineppu
Kami-Otoineppu	上音威子府	5.4		Otoineppu
Tenpoku-Zakae	天北栄	11.6		Nakatonbetsu
Shō-Tonbetsu	小頓別	15.6	Utanobori Municipal Railway (closed on November 1, 1970)	Nakatonbetsu
Kami-Tonbetsu	上頓別	20.6		Nakatonbetsu
Megumino	恵野	23.2		Nakatonbetsu
Pinneshiri	敏音知	27.1		Nakatonbetsu
Shūmaro	周磨	31.2		Nakatonbetsu
Matsuneshiri	松音知	34.5		Nakatonbetsu
Kamikoma	上駒	37.4		Nakatonbetsu
Naka-Tonbetsu	中頓別	42.5		Nakatonbetsu
Kotobuki	寿	46.6		Nakatonbetsu
Shin-Yayoi	新弥生	48.0		Nakatonbetsu
Shimo-Tonbetsu	下頓別	51.6		Hamatonbetsu
Tokiwa	常盤	54.8		Hamatonbetsu
Hama-Tonbetsu	浜頓別	61.5	Kohinhoku Line (Closed on July 1, 1985)	Hamatonbetsu
Kita-Tonbetsu	北頓別			Hamatonbetsu
Yamagaru	山軽	67.7		Hamatonbetsu
Yasubetsu	安別	70.4		Sarufutsu
Hikōjō-mae	飛行場前	72.8		Sarufutsu
Asajino	浅茅野	76.7		Sarufutsu
Sarufutsu	猿払	82.9		Sarufutsu
Ashino	芦野	87.4		Sarufutsu
Onishibetsu	鬼志別	93.7		Sarufutsu
Koishi	小石	99.0		Sarufutsu
Magarifuchi	曲淵	116.7		Wakkanai
Numakawa	沼川	121.0		Wakkanai
Kabaoka	樺岡	127.2		Wakkanai
Keihoku	恵北	136.3		Wakkanai
Higashi-Koetoi	東声問			Wakkanai
Koetoi	声問	141.8		Wakkanai
Uennai	宇遠内	146.8		Wakkanai
Minami-Wakkanai	南稚内	148.9	Sōya Main Line	Wakkanai

== After discontinuing ==
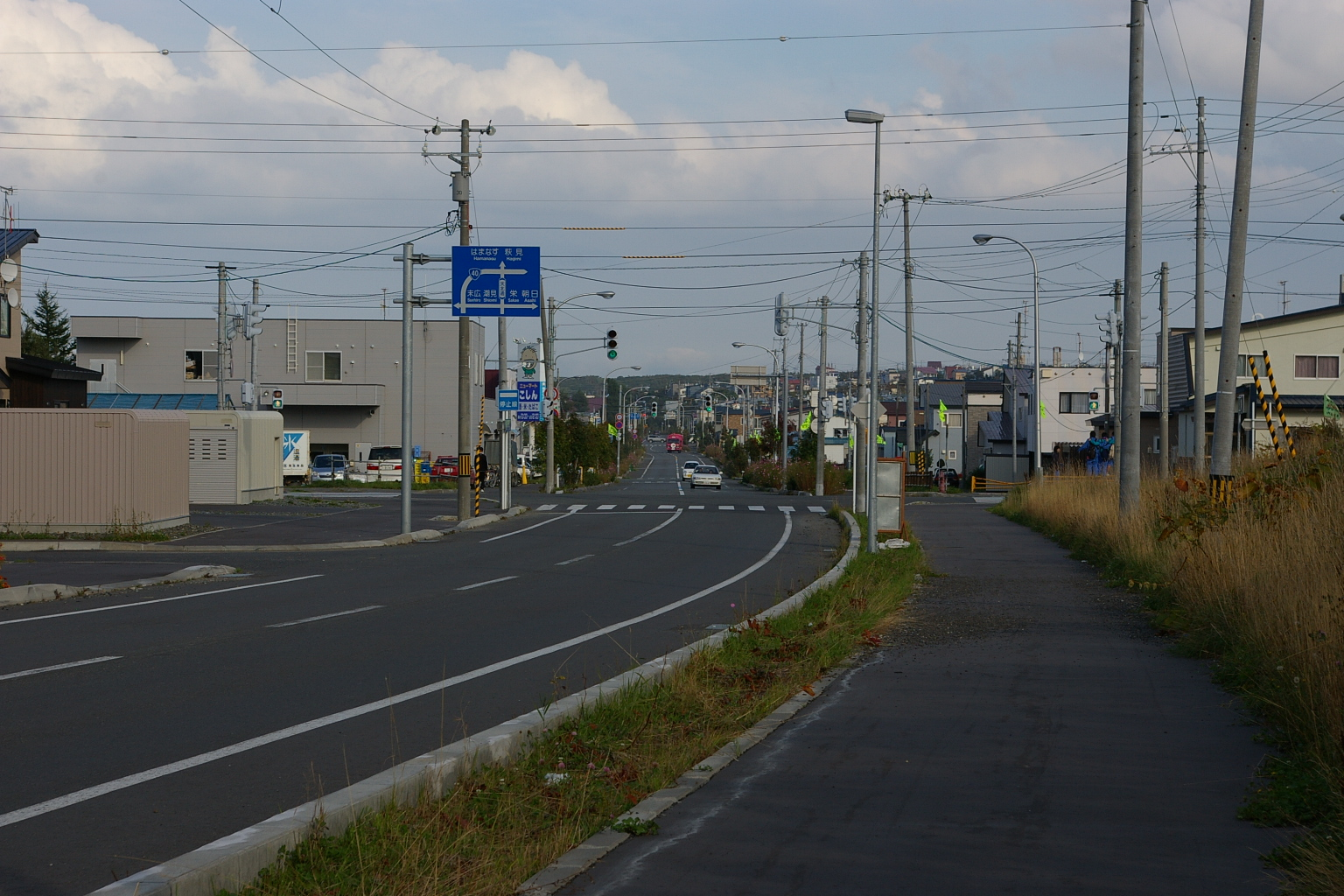
Trackbed of the Tempoku Line in Wakkanai

Soya Bus (Belong to Tokyu Group until 1999) have altered the Tenpoku Line since 1989. But the altered line was partly discontinued in 2011.

== See also ==
- Sōya Main Line
