= Esashi, Hokkaido (Sōya) =

Esashi 枝幸町
- Town
- Flag Chapter
- Interactive map of Esashi
- Location in Japan
- Coordinates: 44°56′19″N 142°34′53″E
- Country: Japan
- Region: Hokkaido
- Prefecture: Hokkaido (Sōya Subprefecture)
- District: Esashi

Area
  - Total: 1,115.62 km^{2} (430.74 sq mi)

Population (June 30, 2024)
  - Total: 7,276
  - Density: 6.522/km^{2} (16.89/sq mi)
- Time zone: UTC+09:00 (JST)
- City hall address: 916 Honmachi, Esashi-cho, Esashi-gun, Hokkaido 098-5892
- Climate: Dfb
- Website: Official website
- Symbols
- Bird: Common gull, wagtail
- Flower: Rosa rugosa, Adonis ramosa
- Tree: Japanese Rowan, Ezo Spruce

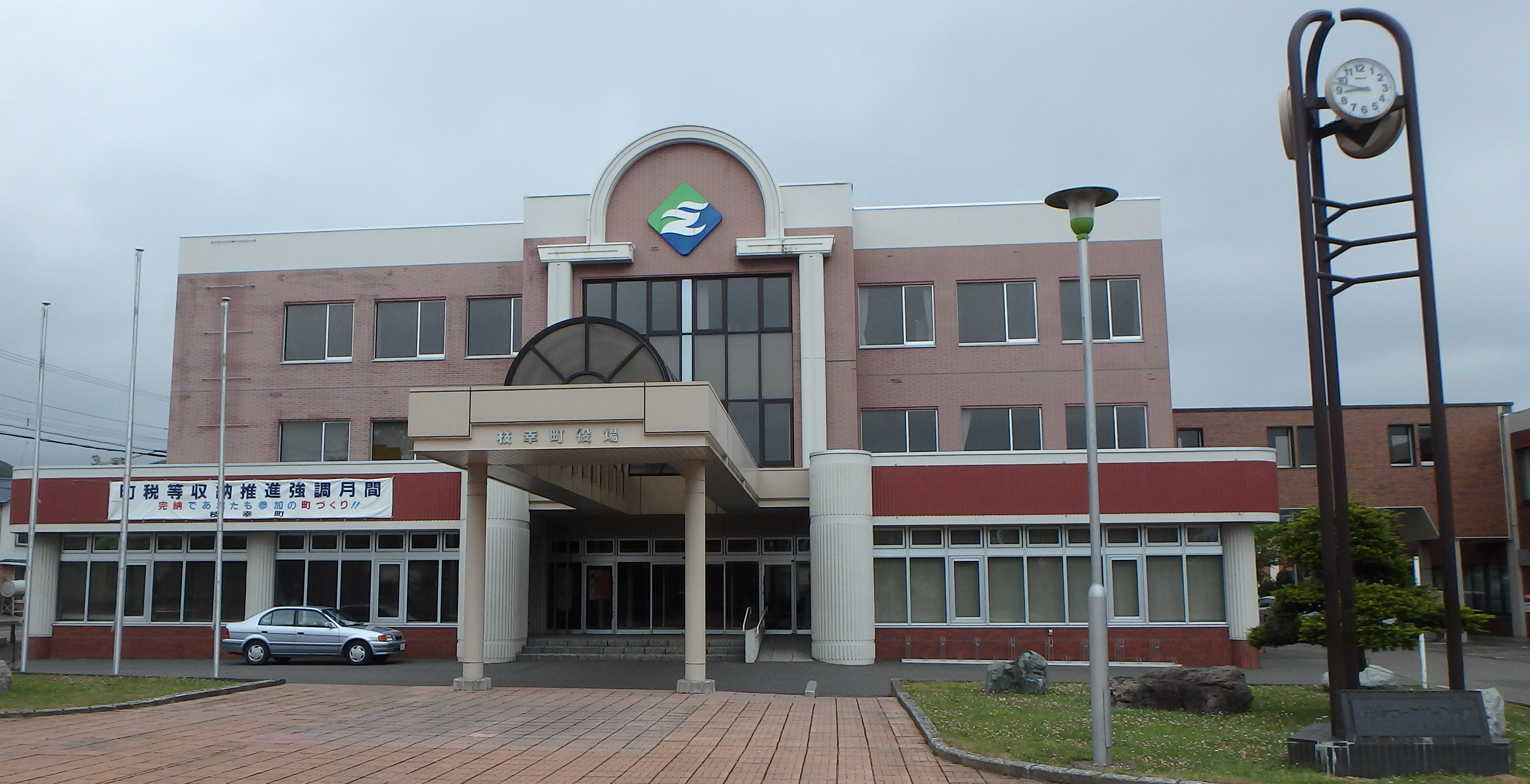
Esashi Town Hall

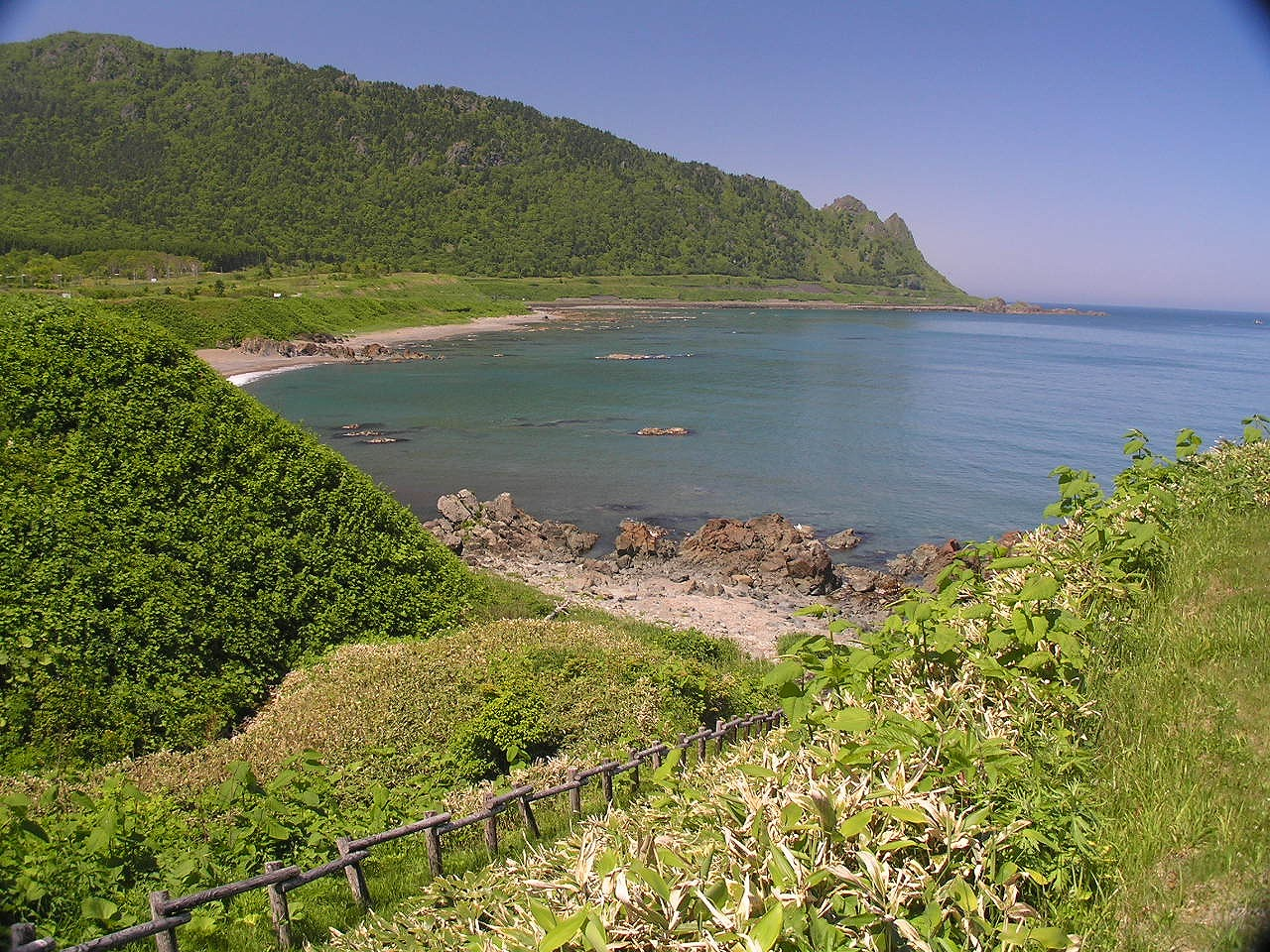
Cape Kamui Park

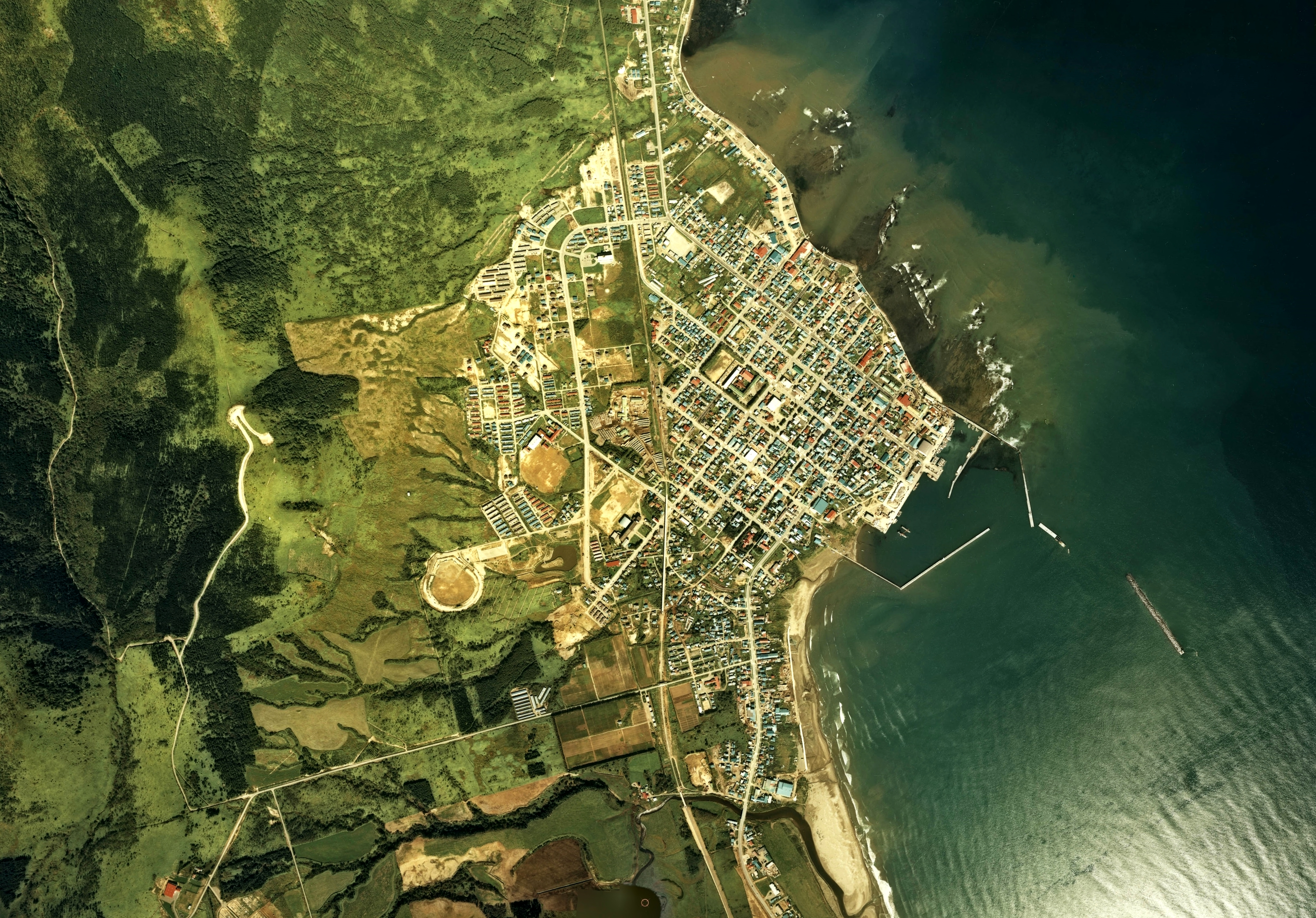
Esashi town(Soya) center area Aerial photograph.1977

Esashi (枝幸町, Esashi-chō) is a town located in Sōya Subprefecture, Hokkaido, Japan. As of 30 June 2024, the town had an estimated population of 7,276 in 3918 households, and a population density of 8.1 people per km^{2}. The total area of the town is 1,115.62 km^{2} (430.74 sq mi). The name of the town comes from the Ainu word "Esaushi", meaning "cape" (in the geographic sense).

== Geography ==
Esashi is located at the southeast tip of Sōya Subprefecture, and faces the Sea of Okhotsk to the east. It consists of mostly rugged terrain sandwiched between the sea and the mountains, with the main urban area on a long, narrow strip of the coast. The area around the mouth of the Kitami Horobetsu River is a marshland. The west is mountainous, with 80% of the area covered by forest. The southern border of the city is marked by the Toinai River, and the north is marked by Cape Kamui. Parts of the town are within the borders of the North Okhotsk Prefectural Natural Park.

- Mountains: Mount Hako (1129 meters), Mount Yane Mune (1,039m), Mount Shiassiri (903m), Mount Kumanodake (954m), Mount Polonupuri (841m)
- Rivers: Esashiuennai River, Kitami Horobetsu River, Tokushibe River, Otutadabe River, Fureppu River, Onbo River

=== Neighbouring municipalities ===
- Hokkaido
  - Bifuka
  - Hamatonbetsu
  - Horonobe
  - Nakatonbetsu
  - Ōmu
  - Otoineppu

=== Climate ===
Esashi has a humid continental climate (Köppen: Dfb).

Temperatures in summer exceed 30 °C (86 °F) for short time of midday. Early morning in winter it below −20 °C (−4 °F). The highest temperature ever recorded in Esashi was 35.0 °C (95.0 °F) on 31 July 2000. The coldest temperature ever recorded was −26.4 °C (−15.5 °F) on 12 February 1947.

Snow falls from end of November till May. It covers ground from December and melts rapidly in April. Drift ices of the Sea of Okhotsk come to Esashi first in Hoddaido, usually January to March. Fishery, town's main industry, is impossible while ices contact on land and is limited until ices disappear completely from the sea around the town.

Climate data for Esashi, Hokkaido (Sōya), elevation 7 m (23 ft), (1991–2020 normals, extremes 1942–present)
Month	Jan	Feb	Mar	Apr	May	Jun	Jul	Aug	Sep	Oct	Nov	Dec	Year
Record high °C (°F)	7.2 (45.0)	12.9 (55.2)	16.2 (61.2)	26.1 (79.0)	31.9 (89.4)	32.6 (90.7)	35.0 (95.0)	34.6 (94.3)	32.1 (89.8)	27.7 (81.9)	21.1 (70.0)	12.9 (55.2)	35.0 (95.0)
Mean maximum °C (°F)	2.9 (37.2)	5.2 (41.4)	10.5 (50.9)	18.6 (65.5)	25.7 (78.3)	27.2 (81.0)	28.9 (84.0)	29.8 (85.6)	27.3 (81.1)	21.7 (71.1)	15.4 (59.7)	6.1 (43.0)	31.3 (88.3)
Mean daily maximum °C (°F)	−2.8 (27.0)	−2.3 (27.9)	1.8 (35.2)	8.2 (46.8)	13.4 (56.1)	16.0 (60.8)	19.8 (67.6)	22.4 (72.3)	20.5 (68.9)	14.4 (57.9)	6.1 (43.0)	−0.4 (31.3)	9.8 (49.6)
Daily mean °C (°F)	−5.5 (22.1)	−5.4 (22.3)	−1.5 (29.3)	4.3 (39.7)	9.1 (48.4)	12.4 (54.3)	16.6 (61.9)	19.1 (66.4)	16.5 (61.7)	10.3 (50.5)	3.0 (37.4)	−3.1 (26.4)	6.3 (43.3)
Mean daily minimum °C (°F)	−8.6 (16.5)	−9.2 (15.4)	−4.9 (23.2)	0.8 (33.4)	5.5 (41.9)	9.5 (49.1)	14.0 (57.2)	16.3 (61.3)	12.8 (55.0)	6.3 (43.3)	−0.2 (31.6)	−6.1 (21.0)	3.0 (37.4)
Mean minimum °C (°F)	−14.8 (5.4)	−15.6 (3.9)	−11.7 (10.9)	−4.6 (23.7)	0.3 (32.5)	4.6 (40.3)	9.6 (49.3)	12.1 (53.8)	7.2 (45.0)	0.8 (33.4)	−6.8 (19.8)	−11.6 (11.1)	−16.2 (2.8)
Record low °C (°F)	−22.3 (−8.1)	−26.4 (−15.5)	−23.9 (−11.0)	−14.1 (6.6)	−3.0 (26.6)	0.4 (32.7)	4.2 (39.6)	6.6 (43.9)	2.6 (36.7)	−4.9 (23.2)	−11.5 (11.3)	−19.2 (−2.6)	−26.4 (−15.5)
Average precipitation mm (inches)	75.6 (2.98)	56.5 (2.22)	64.8 (2.55)	56.4 (2.22)	69.1 (2.72)	82.4 (3.24)	125.0 (4.92)	141.4 (5.57)	134.9 (5.31)	127.7 (5.03)	124.1 (4.89)	101.8 (4.01)	1,159.6 (45.65)
Average snowfall cm (inches)	138 (54)	110 (43)	91 (36)	22 (8.7)	1 (0.4)	0 (0)	0 (0)	0 (0)	0 (0)	1 (0.4)	59 (23)	139 (55)	562 (221)
Average extreme snow depth cm (inches)	81 (32)	98 (39)	98 (39)	50 (20)	1 (0.4)	0 (0)	0 (0)	0 (0)	0 (0)	1 (0.4)	23 (9.1)	52 (20)	104 (41)
Average precipitation days (≥ 1.0 mm)	23.0	20.1	18.5	13.0	11.6	11.2	11.2	12.0	14.0	16.2	21.5	23.9	196.1
Average snowy days (≥ 3.0 cm)	14.8	12.0	9.7	2.4	0.1	0.0	0.0	0.0	0.0	0.1	5.7	14.1	59.0
Average relative humidity (%)	77	76	72	70	75	83	86	83	77	72	74	76	77
Mean monthly sunshine hours	76.0	101.2	142.5	172.2	169.0	140.0	123.4	128.8	154.8	142.2	78.9	71.2	1,504.6
Source 1: Japan Meteorological Agency
Source 2: Météo Climat

== Demographics ==
Per Japanese census data, the population of Esashi is as shown below. The town is in a long period of sustained population loss.

Historical population
Year	Pop.	±%
1940	11,105	—
1950	16,992	+53.0%
1960	18,541	+9.1%
1970	15,756	−15.0%
1980	13,633	−13.5%
1990	11,819	−13.3%
2000	10,509	−11.1%
2010	9,121	−13.2%
2020	7,565	−17.1%

== History ==
Esashi District was established in 1869 in Kitami Province (1868–1882), a short-lived province in the north of Hokkaido. The district was historically under the control of the Kaga Domain on Honshu; this control ended in 1870. In 1878, the villages of Esashi, Tonbetsu, Utanobetsu, and Rebun were established in Esashi District, Kitami Province. In 1909 the four villages merged to form the second-class village of Esashi; however, Tonbetsu was separated out in April 1916. In April 1923, Esashi was raised to a first-class village. Utanobori was separated from Esashi in September 1939. On May 11, 1940, a forest fire razed most of Esashi, with 16 people killed and 547 buildings destroyed. Esashi was raised to town status in October 1947. On March 20, 2006, Esashi merged with the town of Utanobori.

== Government ==
Esashi has a mayor-council form of government with a directly elected mayor and a unicameral town council of 12 members. Esashi, as part of Soya sub-prefecture, contributes one member to the Hokkaido Prefectural Assembly. In terms of national politics, the town is part of the Hokkaido 12th district of the lower house of the Diet of Japan.

== Economy ==
The local economy of Esashi is centered on commercial fishing and dairy farming. In particular, Esashi is noted for its catch of horsehair crab, salmon, and scallops. The waters off Esashi are rich in marine plankton carried by drift ice that moves south in the southern Okhotsk Sea in winter. The crab catch is one of the largest in Japan using crab trap fishing. Scallops from Esashi are not only consumed domestically, but are also exported to China, France, and North America. In addition, various seafood such as flounder, sea cucumber, sea bream, sea urchin, and octopus are landed.

== Education ==
Easahi has seven public elementary schools and three public junior high schools operated by the town government. The town has one public high school operated by the Hokkaido Board of Education.

== Transportation ==
=== Railways ===
Esashi has not had any passenger railway services since the closing of the JR Hokkaido Tempoku Line in 1989. The nearest railway station is Otoineppu Station on the Sōya Main Line.

=== Highways ===
- National Route 238

== Local attractions ==
- Okhotsk Museum Esashi

== Mascot ==
Esashi-kun, the town's mascot

Esashi's mascot is Esashi-kun (えさっしー). He is a bright and energetic fairy who loves the forest and the sea and the taste of the horsehair crab. As such, he customized his hat with the things he likes. He is unveiled in 2011. He is created by Ayumi Shozaki of Osaka.

== bibliography ==
- Esashi Town History Editing Committee, Esashi Town History, volume 1 (1967). 枝幸町史編纂委員会『枝幸町史』上巻。
