= Hamatonbetsu, Hokkaido =

Hamatonbetsu 浜頓別町
- Town
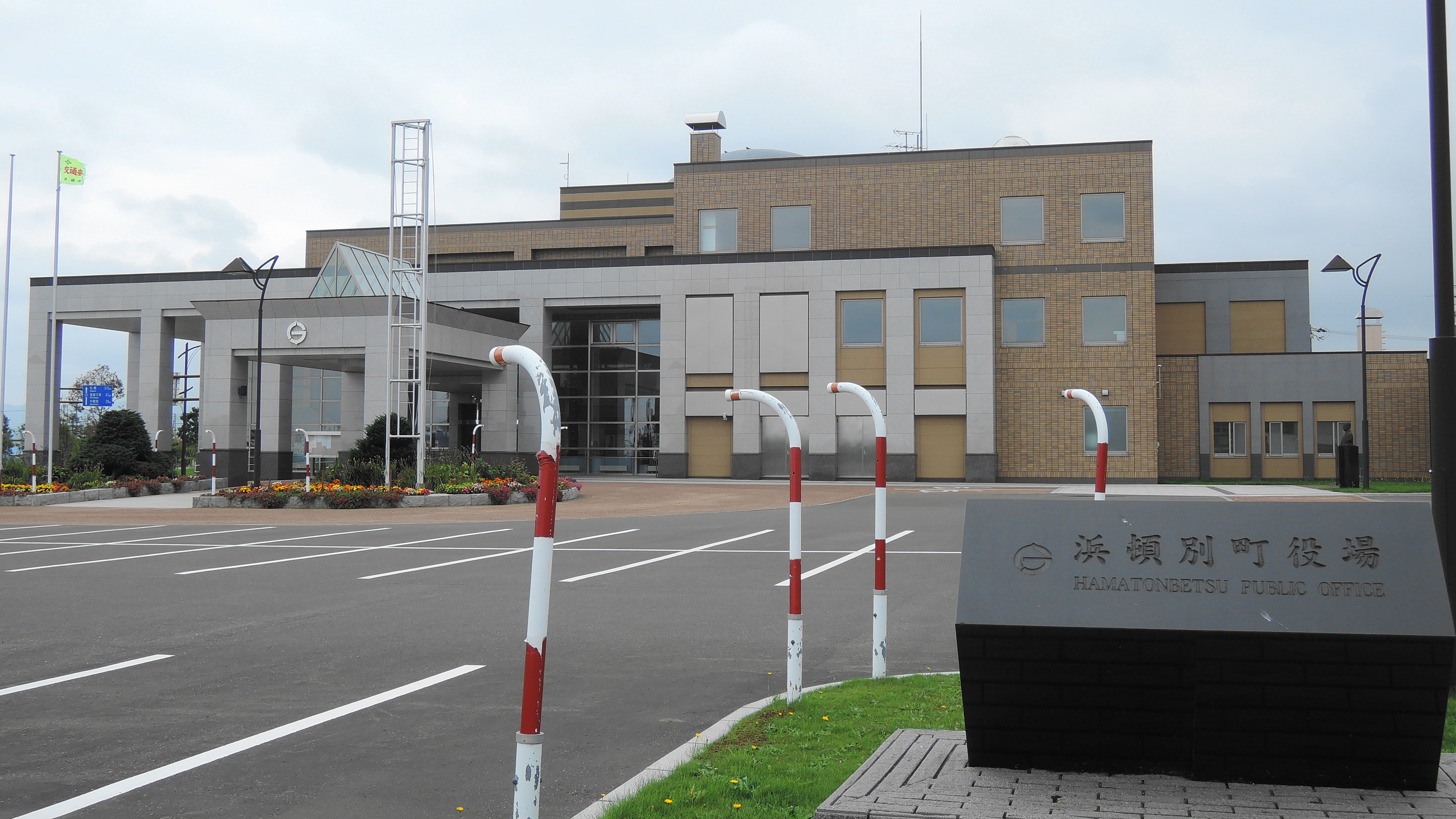
- Hamatonbetsu town hall

- Flag Chapter seal
- Interactive map of Hamatonbetsu
- Location in Japan
- Coordinates: 45°7′26″N 142°21′35″E
- Country: Japan
- Region: Hokkaido
- Prefecture: Hokkaido (Sōya Subprefecture)
- District: Esashi

Area
  - Total: 401.59 km^{2} (155.05 sq mi)

Population (July 1, 2024)
  - Total: 3,263
  - Density: 8.125/km^{2} (21.04/sq mi)
- Time zone: UTC+09:00 (JST)
- City hall address: Chūō-Minami 1-ban, Hamatonbetsu-chō, Esashi-gun, Hokkaidō 098-5792
- Climate: Dfb
- Website: Official website
- Symbols
- Bird: Tundra swan
- Flower: Caltha
- Tree: Sakhalin Spruce

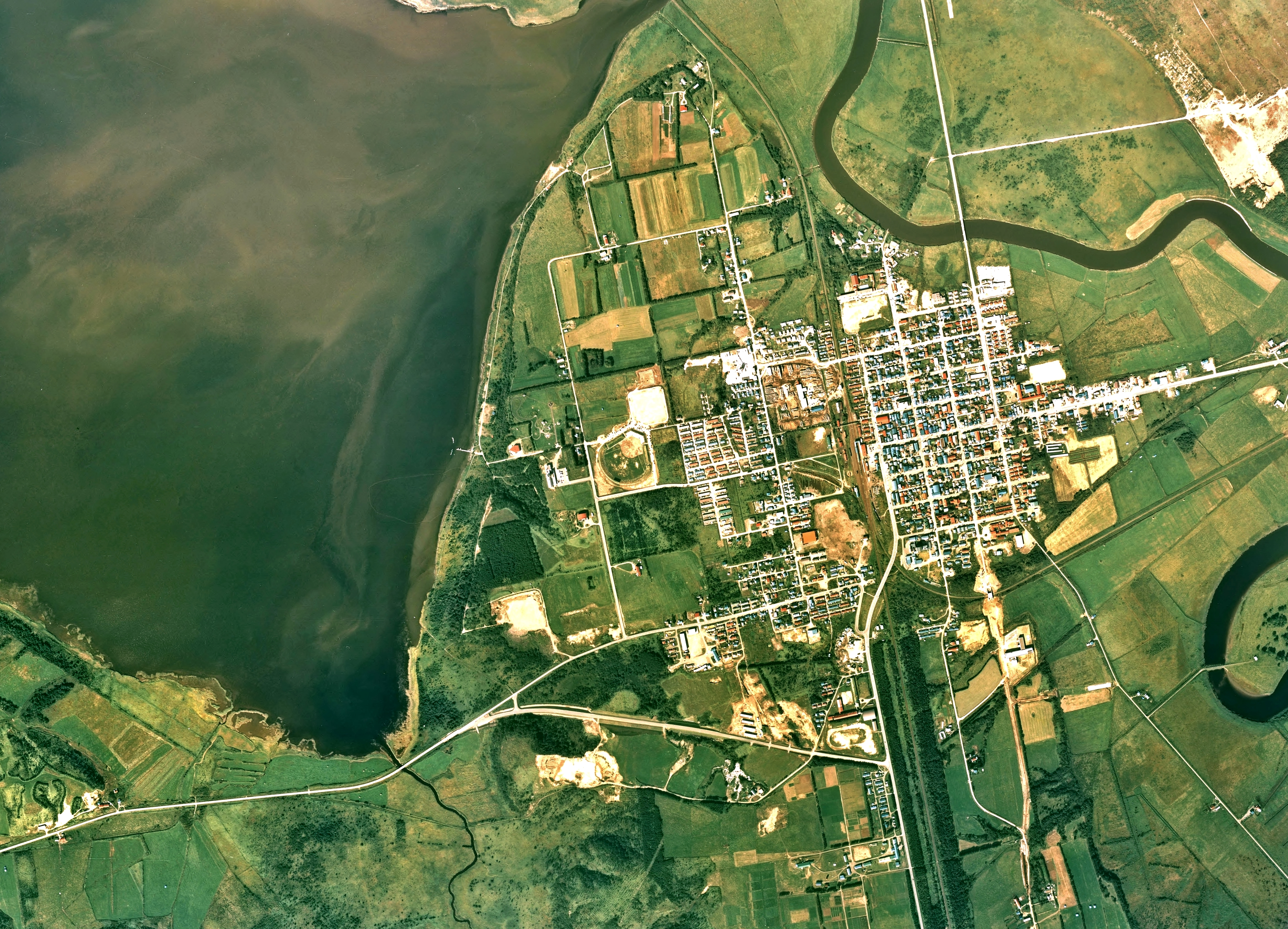
Hamatonbetsu town center area Aerial photograph.1977

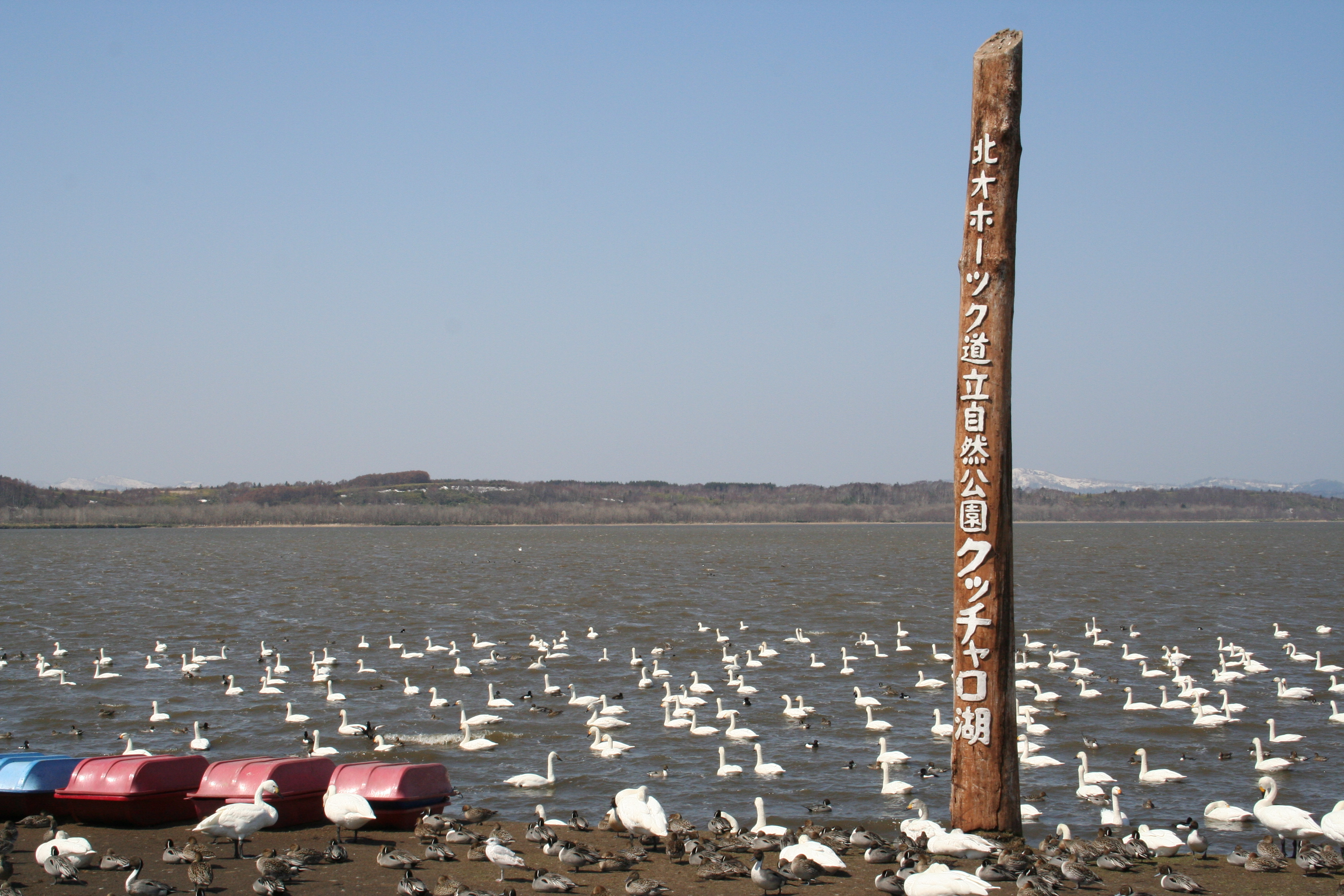
Lake Kutcharo

Hamatonbetsu (浜頓別町, Hamatonbetsu-chō) is a town located in Sōya Subprefecture, Hokkaido, Japan. As of 1 July 2024, the town had an estimated population of 3,263 in 1841 households, and a population density of 8.1 people per km^{2}. The total area of the town is 401.59 km^{2} (155.05 sq mi).

== Geography ==
Hamatonbetsu is located in northeast Hokkaido; it faces the Sea of Okhotsk to the east where, during the winter, there is drift ice. Coastal areas of the town are marshy, and mountains spread out in the western and southern parts of the town. Lake Kutcharo designated a Ramsar site in July 1989, and host nearly 300 bird species either year round or as part of the avians' migratory pattern. Parts of the town are within the borders of the North Okhotsk Prefectural Natural Park.

- Mountains: Mount Jumon (761m)
- Rivers: Tonbetsu River, Toyosambe River
- Lakes: Lake Kutcharo

=== Neighbouring municipalities ===
- Hokkaido
  - Esashi
  - Horonobe
  - Nakatonbetsu
  - Sarufutsu

=== Climate ===
Hamatonbetsu has cold and temperate climate considered to be Dfb according to the Köppen-Geiger climate classification. There is a considerable amount of rainfall even during months that typically experience dry weather. The average annual temperature in Hamatonbetsu is 5.9 °C. Each year, there is an approximate 1112 mm of precipitation. The temperatures are highest on average in August, at around 19.1 °C, and lowest in January, at around -6.6 °C.

Climate data for Hamatonbetsu, elevation 18 m (59 ft), (1991−2020 normals, extremes 1977−present)
Month	Jan	Feb	Mar	Apr	May	Jun	Jul	Aug	Sep	Oct	Nov	Dec	Year
Record high °C (°F)	8.2 (46.8)	9.3 (48.7)	15.9 (60.6)	23.6 (74.5)	29.7 (85.5)	30.6 (87.1)	33.6 (92.5)	33.4 (92.1)	30.9 (87.6)	24.7 (76.5)	19.0 (66.2)	10.2 (50.4)	33.6 (92.5)
Mean daily maximum °C (°F)	−3.3 (26.1)	−2.6 (27.3)	1.4 (34.5)	8.0 (46.4)	13.7 (56.7)	16.9 (62.4)	20.7 (69.3)	22.8 (73.0)	20.3 (68.5)	14.1 (57.4)	5.6 (42.1)	−1.0 (30.2)	9.7 (49.5)
Daily mean °C (°F)	−6.3 (20.7)	−6.3 (20.7)	−2.0 (28.4)	4.0 (39.2)	9.2 (48.6)	12.8 (55.0)	16.9 (62.4)	19.0 (66.2)	15.8 (60.4)	9.6 (49.3)	2.4 (36.3)	−3.8 (25.2)	5.9 (42.7)
Mean daily minimum °C (°F)	−10.3 (13.5)	−11.1 (12.0)	−6.1 (21.0)	0.1 (32.2)	4.9 (40.8)	9.0 (48.2)	13.7 (56.7)	15.7 (60.3)	11.7 (53.1)	5.3 (41.5)	−1.0 (30.2)	−7.2 (19.0)	2.1 (35.7)
Record low °C (°F)	−27.4 (−17.3)	−27.4 (−17.3)	−24.6 (−12.3)	−10.2 (13.6)	−4.2 (24.4)	−2.0 (28.4)	1.0 (33.8)	4.0 (39.2)	1.9 (35.4)	−4.1 (24.6)	−16.8 (1.8)	−19.5 (−3.1)	−27.4 (−17.3)
Average precipitation mm (inches)	62.1 (2.44)	46.7 (1.84)	50.2 (1.98)	47.6 (1.87)	61.0 (2.40)	65.0 (2.56)	116.9 (4.60)	118.9 (4.68)	121.4 (4.78)	106.4 (4.19)	101.9 (4.01)	83.3 (3.28)	997.0 (39.25)
Average precipitation days (≥ 1.0 mm)	17.5	15.1	13.5	10.6	10.8	10.2	11.3	11.7	13.1	14.5	17.7	19.2	165.2
Mean monthly sunshine hours	59.7	82.3	132.2	166.3	174.0	148.2	132.9	143.1	165.3	135.7	71.9	56.6	1,470.1
Source 1: JMA
Source 2: JMA

=== Demographics ===
Per Japanese census data, the population of Hamatonbetsu is as shown below. The town is in a long period of sustained population loss.

Historical population
Year	Pop.	±%
1940	5,529	—
1950	7,543	+36.4%
1960	8,074	+7.0%
1970	7,130	−11.7%
1980	6,503	−8.8%
1990	5,573	−14.3%
2000	4,957	−11.1%
2010	4,172	−15.8%
2020	3,448	−17.4%

== History ==
The name of "Tonbetsu" derives from the Ainu language word to-un-pet, which translates "river entering lake", and which referred to the Tonbetsu River which enters Lake Kutcharo. In 1878, the villages of Esashi, Tonbetsu, Utanobetsu, and Rebun were established in Esashi District, Kitami Province. In 1909 the four villages merged to form the village of Esashi; however, Tonbetsu was separated out in April 1916. In April 1921, Tonbestu was divided into Tonbetsu and Nakatonbetsu villages. Tonbetsu was raised to town status on November 1, 1951, and was renamed Hamatonbetsu due to its coastal location.

== Government ==
Hamatonbetsu has a mayor-council form of government with a directly elected mayor and a unicameral town council of ten members. Hamatonbetsu, as part of Soya sub-prefecture, contributes one member to the Hokkaido Prefectural Assembly. In terms of national politics, the town is part of the Hokkaido 12th district of the lower house of the Diet of Japan.

== Economy ==
The local economy of Hamatonbetsu is centered on commercial fishing and dairy farming. In particular, Hamatonbetsu is noted for its scallops, salmon and crabs.

== Education ==
Hamatonbetsu has four public elementary schools and one public junior high school operated by the town government. The town has one public high school operated by the Hokkaido Board of Education.

== Transportation ==
=== Railways ===
Hamatonbetsu has not had any passenger railway services since the closing of the JR Hokkaido Tempoku Line in 1989. The nearest railway station is Minami-Wakkanai Station or Otoineppu Station on the Sōya Main Line, a 1.5 hour bus ride away.

=== Highways ===
- National Route 238
- National Route 275

== Local attractions ==
- Hamatonbetsu onsen
- Kitami Kamuimisaki
- Lake Kutcharo

== Notable people from Hamatonbetsu ==
- Masato Hatanaka, musician

== Mascot ==
Swatton, the town's mascot

Hamatonbetsu's mascot is Swatton (スワットン) who is a gentle yet clumsy pig dressed as a tundra swan. He lives in areas surrounding Lake Kutcharo. His birthday is August 21. According to Ainu legend, he first appeared during the Jomon period to bring food and medical needs for good health and protection from crimes and natural disasters. Nowadays, he is no longer a god anymore. Instead, he is now a ballet dancer (who is auditioning for Swan Lake) and the assistant to the mayor. He still helps the town to children and adults around the world and brings happiness during difficult times by his dance moves while promoting the town. He knows laughter is the best medicine.
