= Shimotombetsu =

Area of Hamatonbetsu, Hokkaido, Japan

Coordinates: 45°02′22″N 142°18′42″E

Shimotombetsu (下頓別) is a part of the town of Hamatonbetsu, located in Esashi District, Sōya Subprefecture, Hokkaido, Japan.

Shimotombetsu Junior High School (下頓別中学校) is a public three-year junior high school.
