= North Okhotsk Prefectural Natural Park =

Natural park in Hokkaido, Japan

- 北オホーツク道立自然公園
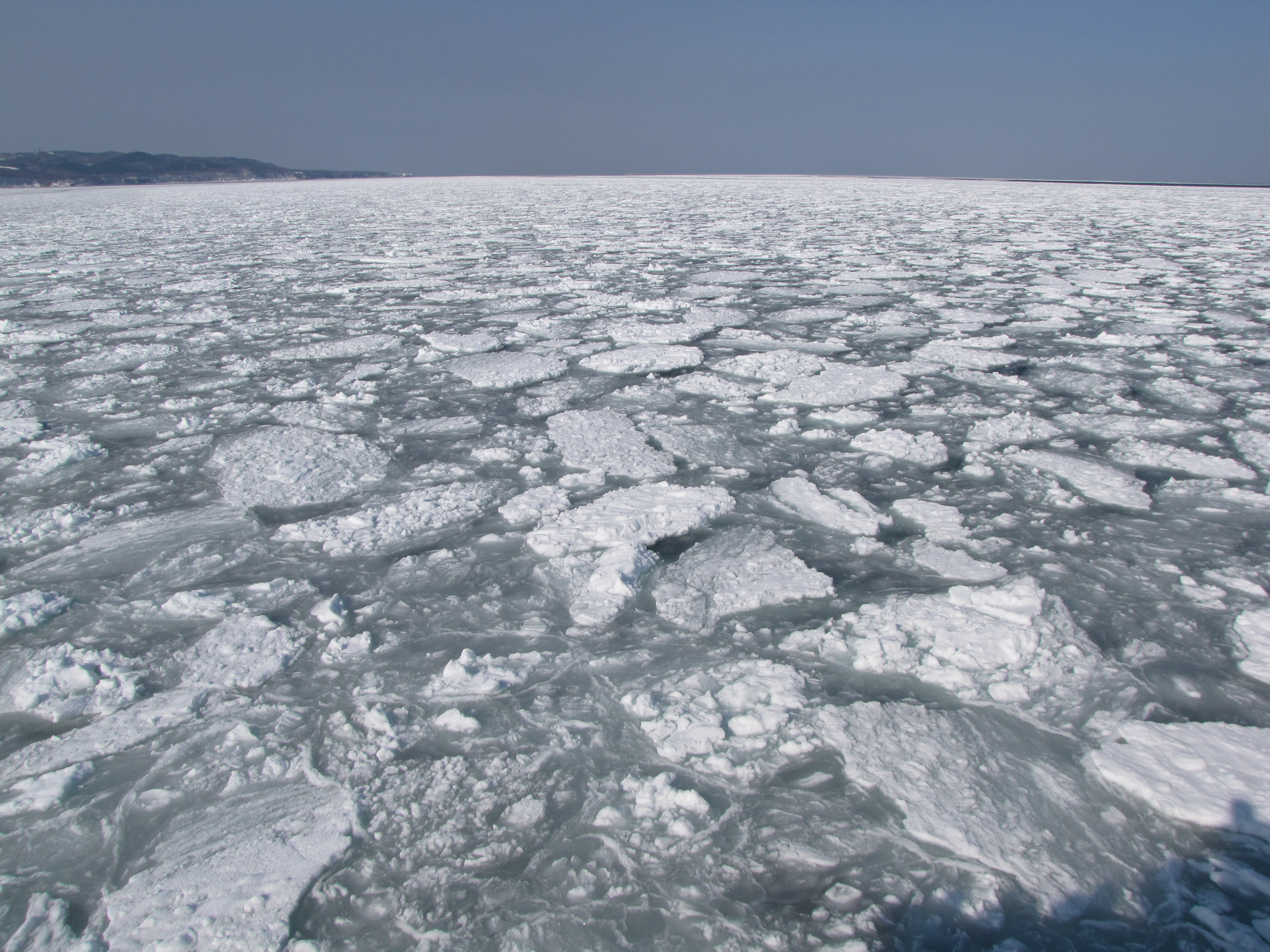
- Drift ice in the Sea of Okhotsk
- Interactive map of North Okhotsk Prefectural Natural Park
- Location: Hokkaidō, Japan
- Area: 39.27 km^{2} (15.16 sq mi)
- Established: 15 May 1968

North Okhotsk Prefectural Natural Park (北オホーツク道立自然公園, Kita Ohōtsuku dōritsu shizen kōen) is a Prefectural Natural Park in northern Hokkaidō, Japan. Established in 1968, the park spans the municipalities of Esashi, Hamatonbetsu, and Sarufutsu.

== See also ==
- National Parks of Japan
