= Masato Hatanaka =

Japanese musician

Masato Hatanaka (畑中 正人, Masato Hatanaka; born in 1975 in Hamatonbetsu-cho, Hokkaido, Japan) is a Japanese musician, composer, sound artist, sound designer and producer.

== Biography ==
Masato Hatanaka is a composer who conceives the concept of haute couture sound on his quest for the way sound should be. He creates works in the various fields of Art, Architecture, Design and the Performing Arts. His notable works in 2011 include music compositions for the ISSEY MIYAKE Paris Collection, CANON "NEOREAL WONDER" at Milano Salone.

== Ballet music ==
- Arise
  - Choreograph : Yaroslav Ivanenko, Heather Jurgensen
  - Dance: Heather Jurgensen
  - Music: Masato Hatanaka
- Nostalgia
  - Choreography: Yaroslav Ivanenko (Hamburg Ballet)
  - Dance: Yaroslav Ivanenko
  - Music: Masato Hatanaka
- Prisoners of Feelings
  - World premiere: Copenhagen, Denmark, 2003
  - Choreography: Jiří Bubeníček
  - Dance: Otto Bubeníček and Jiří Bubeníček
  - Music: Masato Hatanaka
- Trip
  - World premiere: Hamburg, Germany, 2003
  - Choreography: Jiří Bubeníček
  - Music: Masato Hatanaka
- Bolero 2
  - World premiere: Iwamizawa-City, Japan, 2001
  - Choreography: Jiří Bubeníček
  - Music, Arrangement, Conductor: Masato Hatanaka

== TV commercials ==
- SONY Japan (sound logo/2009)
- Canada Dry Japan (music – enjoy version, Relax version/2009)
- Sprite Zero Japan (music/2007)
- IHI (music – white world version/2007)
- ST (sound logo /2007)
- Mobile Car Graphic (music/2004)
- K-SAY Driving School (music/1998)
- Quick Shaken (music/1996)

== Web ==
- Sharp [Aquos – Vision] International website, 2007 (music and sound design)
- JT [my resort moment] website, 2007 (music and sound design)
- [Towako lab] website, 2007 (music and sound design)
- Kracie shampoo [Ichikami garden] website, 2006 (music and sound design)
- Designtide Tokyo 2006 (music and sound design)
- Yamaha Digital Piano P series Special site "My style – Hatanaka meets P140s", 2005

== Other advertising music ==
- JAL sky's promotion film, 2004
- volkswagen Japan's promotion event, 2004
- Louis Vuitton Japan's the 25th anniversary event, 2004
- Adidas Golf's new-logo-release exhibition, 2003
- J-phone's original signature music and sound design, 2002
- Hokkaido Institute of Technology's radio CM music, 2000
- Fits [entroop] promotion film, 1999 (music and sound design)

== Stages, event and live performance ==
- [matohu 09 S/S Collection] fashion show in Tokyo, 2008
- Fkikoshi Solo Act Live "XVII in Japan, 2006
- [matohu 07 S/S Collection] fashion show in Tokyo, 2006
- The Nitten's opening ceremony in Tokyo, 2006
- Live performance in DesigtningG 2006's opening ceremony in Fukuoka, Japan 2006
- [him | misa harada men's hat A/W 06-07 collection] fashion show in Tokyo, 2006
- Short Short Film Festival 2006 – music for opening ceremony
- Short Short Film Festival Asia 2006 – music for opening ceremony
- BMW "A History of Innovation seen in Vintage Cars" Live performance in Tokyo, 2006
- Lebel Congress 2005 – Live performance in Tokyo, 2005
- rooms 10 – Live performance in Tokyo, 2005
- Elly Lin "botanical fan tas mo" – Live performance in Sapporo, 2004
- Solo Live in "Japan – Contemporary Ceramics and photography" in Hamburg, 2003
- 7th festival Beyond Innocence 2003 in Osaka
- Solo Live in "Die lange Nacht der Museen in Hamburg" in Hamburg, 2002
- Solo Live in Rikuo Ueda exhibition "wind drawing" in Hamburg, 2002
- Live performance in Satoshi Hata and Fumiki Bando exhibition "226" in Hamburg, 2002
- Ryoji Hojito (piano) and Masato Hatanaka (sampler) Live performance in Sapporo, 2002
- Live performance in "Toru Iwashita – Sokkyo" in Hokkaido, Japan 2002
- "Demeter" Tokachi International Contemporary Art Exhibition, Obihiro, Japan 2002
- Live performance in "ICC (Intercross creative center) Opening event" in Sapporo, 2001
- Opening Act performance in "Carl Stone + Otomo Yoshihide" in Sapporo, 2001
- Live performance in "Immaculate Concept in Sapporo Art Park 2001"
- Live performance in "Sapporo Dome Opening Series" 2001
- Live performance in "MIX 2000" in Sapporo
- Live performance in "UKA" in Sapporo, 2000
- Kive performed in "ArtNova Vol.2" in Tokyo, 2000
- Live performance in "Dance Weeks '00" in Sapporo
- Trio Live at G claf, Sapporo, Japan 2000 (Vocal : Dmitri Prigov / Piano : Ryoji Hojito / Sampler : Masato Hatanaka)
- Japan year in Germany official program "Cultural Exchange From entrance to entrance" in Hamburg, 1999
- Dance Weeks'99 in Sapporo, 1999 (music and sound)
- Live performance in "Orunament" in Sapporo, 1998
- Live performance in "Night Portor" in Sapporo, 1998
- Kenji Hirato Dance Performance "Sola To Ashioto" in Sapporo, 1998
- Sapporo Art Park Summer Ballet Seminar '98 (Prix de Lausanne) in Sapporo, 1998
- Live performance in "Immaculate concept" Fashion show in Hamburg, 1998
- Live performance in "Dance Weeks' 98" in Sapporo, 1998
- Solo Live in Hamburg, 1998
- Solo Live and Session with Fake Sweet in Sapporo, 1997
- Solo Live and Session with Masaya Kimura in Sapporo, 1997
- Live performance in "Fashion Project 1" in Sapporo Art Paradise, 1997
- Kenji Hirato Dance Performance "Ishi Ni Muku Ishi" in Sapporo, 1996 (music and sound design)
- Modern Ballet "The Circus Story" in Sapporo, 1995 (music)
- Live performance in"Non Rule Fashion Show" in Sapporo, 1995
- Live performance in "Poromanta 1" in Sapporo, 1995
- Live performance in "Ripple Across the Water" in Tokyo, 1995

== Space and exhibition ==
- "Infinity" Citizen × Wow in Baselworld 2009, Switzerland
- Curiosity Exhibition Light-Light at LV Hall Louis Vuitton Omotesando in Tokyo, Japan, 2009
- Kansai International Airport in Japan, 2009
- [Istanbul and Beyond] Tabanlioglu Architects×W0W movie Installation at RIBA in LONDON, 2008
- Designtide Tokyo 2008 main site at Midtown Hall in Tokyo, 2008
- Lexus International Gallery Aoyama in Tokyo, 2008
- NEC – monolith at Tokyo Big Sight in Tokyo, 2008
- [Curiosity×Tonerico – Tokyo Wonder] in Milano Salone, 2008
- Directed by Issey Miyake [XXIc. – XXIst Century Man] at 21_21 Design Sight in Tokyo, 2008
- E&Y show room in Tokyo, 2008
- JR Hamamatsu Station in Japan, 2008
- [This Play!] exhibition at 21_21 Design Sight in Tokyo, 2007
- Yamaha design exhibition [scene of tone] in Milano Salone 2007
- W0W movie installation [Tenspace] in TENT LONDON, 2007
- Spa Girdish in Yokohama-city, Japan, 2007
- Kakitsubata Bekkan Gallery in Tokyo, 2006
- Makoto Azuma [Gyakuten no niwa 1] in Fukuoka, Japan, 2006
- hpgrp exhibition in Tokyo, Japan, 2006
- Yasushi Furuhata exhibition "a-R-T" in Tokyo, 2002 (sound design)
- Sapporo Universal Art Exhibition "Peace Life", 2002 (sound design for Satoshi Hata's art work)
- Sapporo dome permanent art work [Perfect World] with Satoshi Hata in Sapporo, Japan, 2001
- Fumiki Bando exhibition in Sapporo, 2001 (sound design)
- High Tide exhibition in Sapporo, 2001 (sound design for Satoshi Hata's art work)
- METOD FRIC exhibition in Sapporo, 2000 (sound design)
- Asia Print Adventure in Sapporo, 1998 (sound design for Satoshi Hata's art work)
- Satoshi Hata solo exhibition "I am the editor" in Sapporo, 1997 (sound design)

== Other music works ==
- Signature sound design for NTT docomo i-widget, mobile phone (2008)
- Mitsuru Fkikoshi's DVD "mr. motion picture" (music)
- H.P.Frace "Bijoux" (music)
- Snowboard's DVD "TOXIC" (music)
- Music for nextmaruni 12 chairs exhibition
- CD produced for rock band "76 motorbike delivery service"
- ElbtonalPercussion CD Album "Drumtronic with Christopher Dell" Remix for the Track 9
- Apichatpong Weerasethakul's short film for Nokia Thailand (music)
- Hamatonbetsu-cho kindergarten song (Lyrics and Music: Masato Hatanaka / 2003)

== Albums ==
- USE (1995)
- Period (1997)
- Ornament (1998)
- Aida vol.1 (2001)
- Ear opener 1 (2003)
- Ear opener 2 (2003)
- Piano (2003)
- 6 doors (2004)
- 10 colors play (2005)
- clue (2007)
- diary (2011)
- Watering (2015)
- ice of feelings (2017)
