= Utanobori, Hokkaido =

Former town in Hokkaido, Japan

Utanbori 歌登町 うたのぼりちょう
- Town
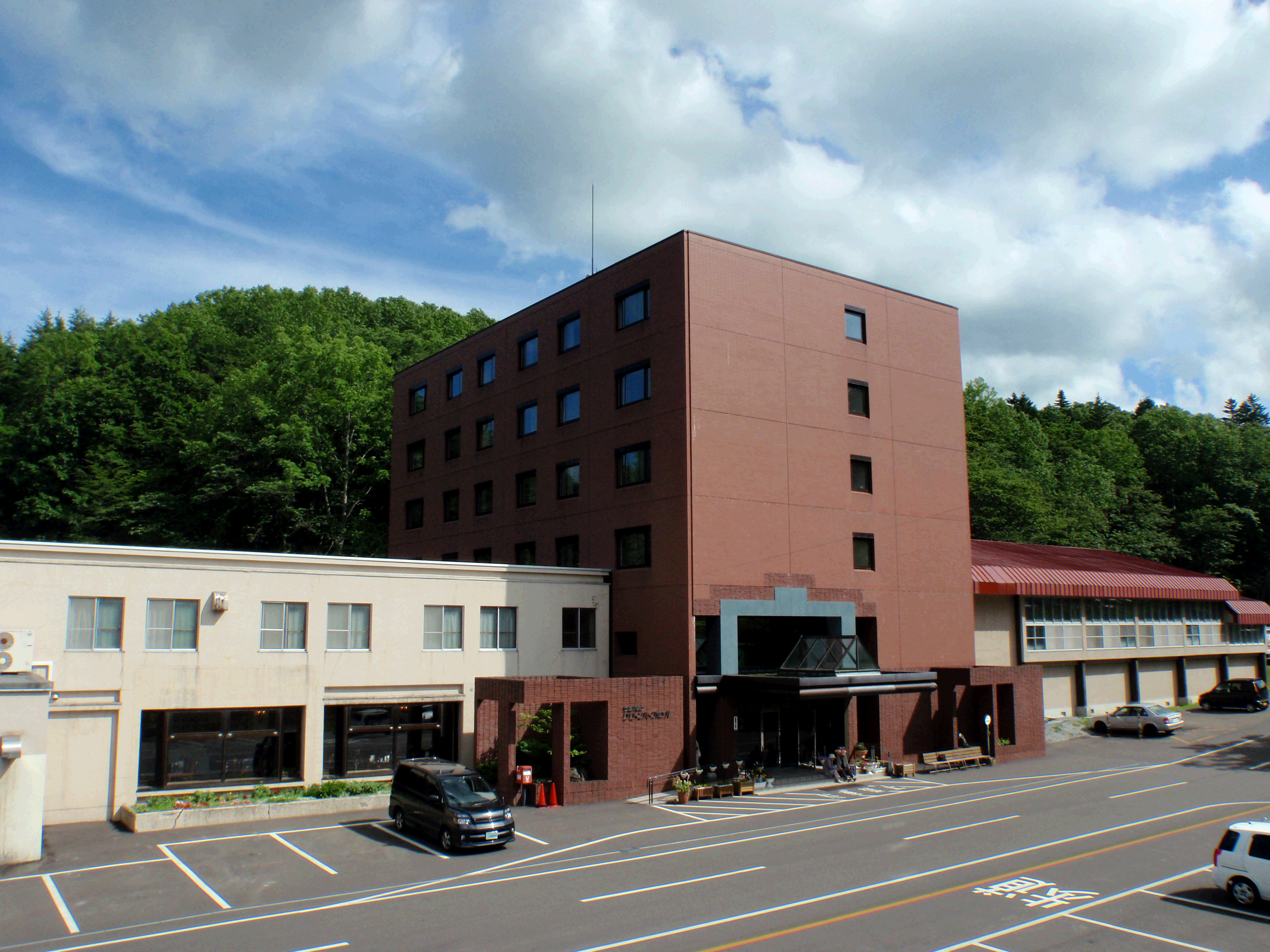
- Utanbori Green Park Hotel

- Flag Seal
- Interactive map of Utanbori
- Country: Japan
- Region: Hokkaido
- Prefecture: Hokkaido
- Subprefecture: Sōya
- District: Esashi

Area
  - Total: 606.51 km^{2} (234.17 sq mi)

Population (2004)
  - Total: 2,332
  - Density: 3.845/km^{2} (9.958/sq mi)

Utanobori (歌登町, Utanobori-chō) was a town located in Esashi District, Sōya Subprefecture, Hokkaido, Japan.

As of 2004, the town had an estimated population of 2,332 and a density of 3.84 persons per km^{2}. The total area was 606.51 km^{2}.

On March 20, 2006, Utanobori was merged into the expanded town of Esashi.

== Climate ==
Climate data for Utanobori, elevation 14 m (46 ft), (1991−2020 normals, extremes 1977−present)
Month	Jan	Feb	Mar	Apr	May	Jun	Jul	Aug	Sep	Oct	Nov	Dec	Year
Record high °C (°F)	7.4 (45.3)	9.0 (48.2)	15.2 (59.4)	25.9 (78.6)	32.2 (90.0)	32.2 (90.0)	35.4 (95.7)	35.2 (95.4)	32.2 (90.0)	26.5 (79.7)	20.2 (68.4)	12.2 (54.0)	35.4 (95.7)
Mean daily maximum °C (°F)	−3.2 (26.2)	−2.3 (27.9)	2.1 (35.8)	8.9 (48.0)	15.6 (60.1)	19.2 (66.6)	22.7 (72.9)	24.1 (75.4)	21.2 (70.2)	14.5 (58.1)	5.7 (42.3)	−1.0 (30.2)	10.6 (51.1)
Daily mean °C (°F)	−8.2 (17.2)	−8.2 (17.2)	−2.9 (26.8)	3.6 (38.5)	9.5 (49.1)	13.4 (56.1)	17.4 (63.3)	18.9 (66.0)	15.1 (59.2)	8.5 (47.3)	1.7 (35.1)	−5.0 (23.0)	5.3 (41.6)
Mean daily minimum °C (°F)	−15.0 (5.0)	−16.1 (3.0)	−9.3 (15.3)	−1.9 (28.6)	3.4 (38.1)	8.2 (46.8)	13.1 (55.6)	14.5 (58.1)	9.4 (48.9)	2.7 (36.9)	−2.6 (27.3)	−10.3 (13.5)	−0.3 (31.4)
Record low °C (°F)	−37.0 (−34.6)	−37.9 (−36.2)	−34.1 (−29.4)	−16.4 (2.5)	−6.4 (20.5)	−2.3 (27.9)	2.7 (36.9)	3.6 (38.5)	−1.1 (30.0)	−7.7 (18.1)	−19.6 (−3.3)	−27.9 (−18.2)	−37.9 (−36.2)
Average precipitation mm (inches)	98.3 (3.87)	67.3 (2.65)	71.0 (2.80)	55.5 (2.19)	69.9 (2.75)	82.9 (3.26)	119.4 (4.70)	149.4 (5.88)	157.2 (6.19)	145.2 (5.72)	157.1 (6.19)	136.4 (5.37)	1,308.3 (51.51)
Average snowfall cm (inches)	199 (78)	157 (62)	135 (53)	52 (20)	3 (1.2)	0 (0)	0 (0)	0 (0)	0 (0)	1 (0.4)	101 (40)	222 (87)	841 (331)
Average extreme snow depth cm (inches)	128 (50)	145 (57)	144 (57)	91 (36)	4 (1.6)	0 (0)	0 (0)	0 (0)	0 (0)	1 (0.4)	37 (15)	89 (35)	156 (61)
Average precipitation days (≥ 1.0 mm)	19.4	15.3	14.6	10.8	10.9	9.5	9.8	11.4	13.6	15.8	19.8	22.1	173
Average snowy days (≥ 3.0 cm)	20.0	16.7	15.0	6.5	0.3	0	0	0	0	0.3	8.8	21.0	88.6
Mean monthly sunshine hours	54.1	81.5	122.9	158.6	178.5	158.5	136.3	136.0	159.2	132.3	61.8	41.7	1,422.8
Source 1: JMA
Source 2: JMA
