= Takeo Hatanaka =

Japanese astronomer

Takeo Hatanaka (畑中 武夫, Hatanaka Takeo; 1 January 1914 – 10 November 1963) was a Japanese radio astronomer. He founded the Nobeyama Radio Observatory.

The crater Hatanaka on the Moon is named after him.
