= Lake Kutcharo =

- クッチャロ湖 (Japanese)
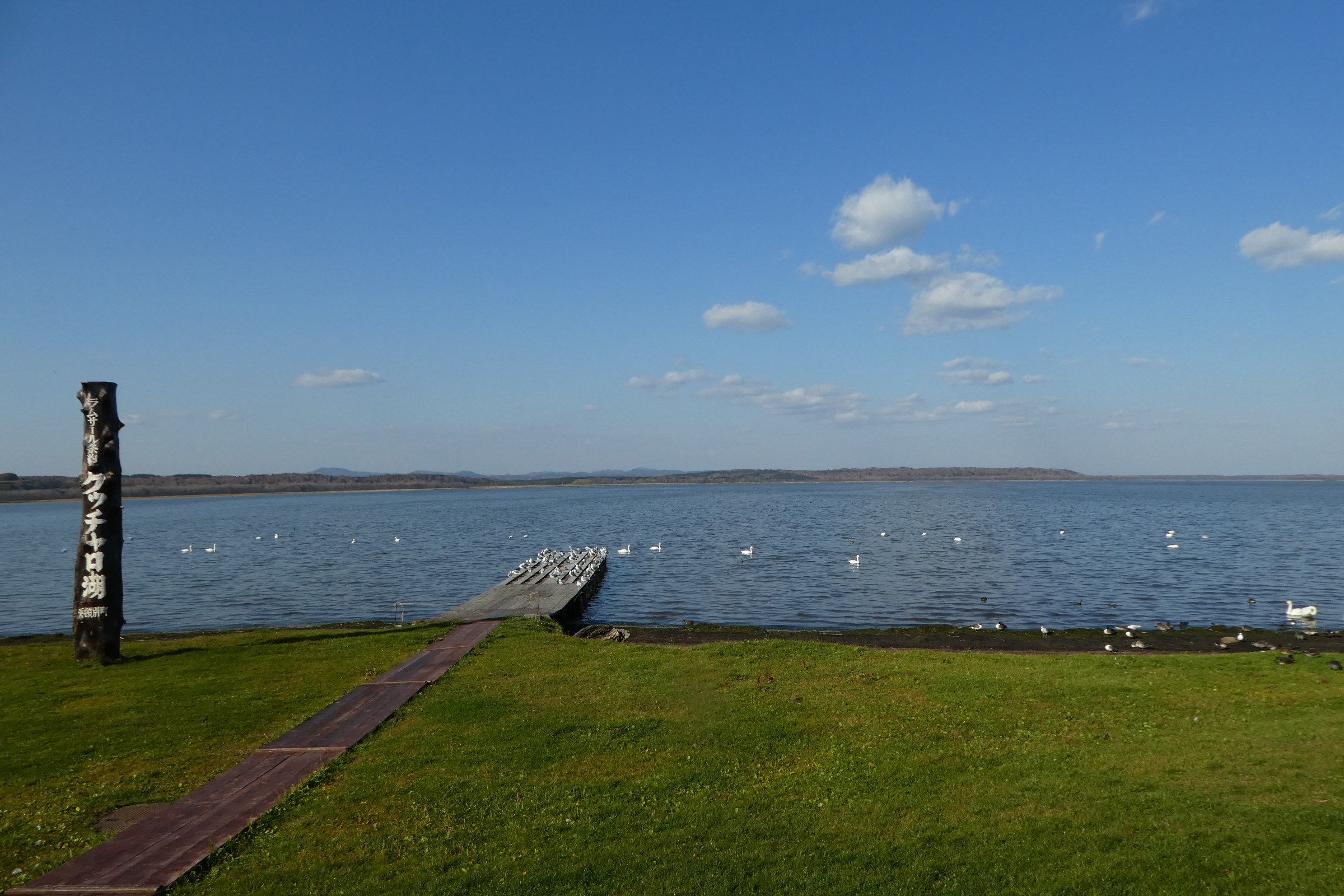
- Lake Kutcharo

- Location within Japan
- Location: Hamatonbetsu, Esashi District, Sōya Subprefecture, Hokkaidō, Japan
- Coordinates: 45°09′N 142°20′E
- Type: Freshwater lake
- Etymology: Ainu kut-char (クㇳチャㇻ), meaning "marsh water outlet".
- Basin countries: Japan
- Surface area: 13.40 square kilometres (5.17 sq mi)
- Average depth: 1.5 metres (4.9 ft)
- Max. depth: 2.5 metres (8.2 ft)
- Shore length^{1}: 27 kilometres (16.8 mi)
- Surface elevation: approx. 1–2 metres (3.3–6.6 ft)
- ^{1} Shore length is not a well-defined measure.

Designations

Ramsar Wetland
- Official name: Kutcharo-ko
- Designated: 6 July 1989
- Reference no.: 439

Lake Kutcharo (クッチャロ湖, Kutcharo-ko) is a pair of inter-connected freshwater lakes in Hamatonbetsu, Esashi District, Sōya Subprefecture, Hokkaidō, Japan. Eight rivers flow into the lakes, and they drain into the Sea of Okhotsk. The lakes were designated a Ramsar site in July 1989, and host nearly 300 bird species either year round or as part of the avians' migratory pattern.

The site is considered especially important for the tundra swan and the white-tailed eagle. Many varieties of ducks use the site, as well, with 50,000-60,000 visiting the lakes annually. A bird banding facility and an observation center are found at the site.

== Etymology and geography ==
The lake name is based on the Ainu kut-char (クㇳチャㇻ), meaning "marsh water outlet".

Lake Kutcharo consists to two interconnected smaller lakes, the smaller northern one called Konuma (小沼) and the larger southern one called Onuma (大沼, Ōnuma). Six rivers flow into Konuma, which flows into Onuma via a small waterway at the northern end of Onuma.

Additionally, two rivers flow into Onuma. The outlet—located at the upper southeast corner of Onuma—flows into the Kutcharo River which flows about 4 kilometres (2.5 mi) east where it converges with the Tonbetsu River about 600 metres (1,968.5 ft) before it empties into the Sea of Okhotsk. Tides can cause some seawater inflow into Onuma. The lake and the surrounding area was designated a Ramsar site in Japan in July 1989.

== Fauna and flora ==
Lake Kutcharo is considered an import wintering and resting site in the migration of tundra swans, with 6000–10,000 visiting each year. More than 290 species of birds are found in and around the lake, especially ducks. About 50,000-60,000 ducks visit annually. The site is important for the conservation of the endangered white-tailed eagle.

The lake is surrounded on three sides by forests of firs and spruces. Ruppia occidentalis is known to grow in the shore area.

== Facilities ==
The Kutcharo-ko Waterfowl Observation Center is located on the southern shore of Onuma, and a bird banding station is located at the southern end of the connecting waterway between the smaller lakes.

== In popular culture ==
Lake Acuity in Pokémon Diamond and Pearl, Pokémon Platinum, Pokémon Brilliant Diamond and Shining Pearl and Pokémon Legends: Arceus is based on this lake as the Sinnoh and Hisui regions is a fictionalized version of Hokkaido.

== See also ==
- List of Ramsar sites in Japan
