= Hatanaka (crater) =

Crater on the Moon

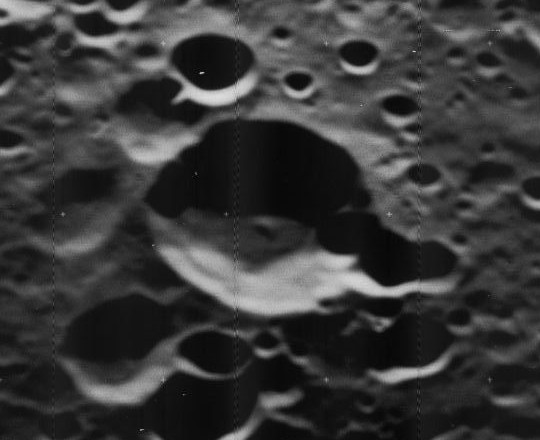
- Oblique Lunar Orbiter 5 image
- Coordinates: 29.7°N 121.5°W
- Diameter: 26 km
- Depth: Unknown
- Colongitude: 122° at sunrise
- Eponym: Takeo Hatanaka

Hatanaka is a lunar impact crater that lies on the Moon's far side, just out of sight past the western limb. It lies to the west of the larger crater Leucippus, and to the northwest of the still larger satellite crater Leucippus Q. It recalls the memory of Takeo Hatanaka (1914 – 1963), a Japanese astronomer.

This is a somewhat eroded crater formation with a pair of small impacts breaking into the northern rim. The inner wall has a slight ledge along the southern face but is otherwise a simple slope leading down to a relatively featureless interior. A small craterlet lies along the northern inner wall, and forms part of the cluster crossing the rim in that area.

== Satellite craters ==
By convention these features are identified on lunar maps by placing the letter on the side of the crater midpoint that is closest to Hatanaka.

Hatanaka	Latitude	Longitude	Diameter
Q	26.1° N	124.2° W	20 km
