= Otoineppu Station =

Railway station in Otoineppu, Hokkaido, Japan

W61 Otoineppu Station 音威子府駅
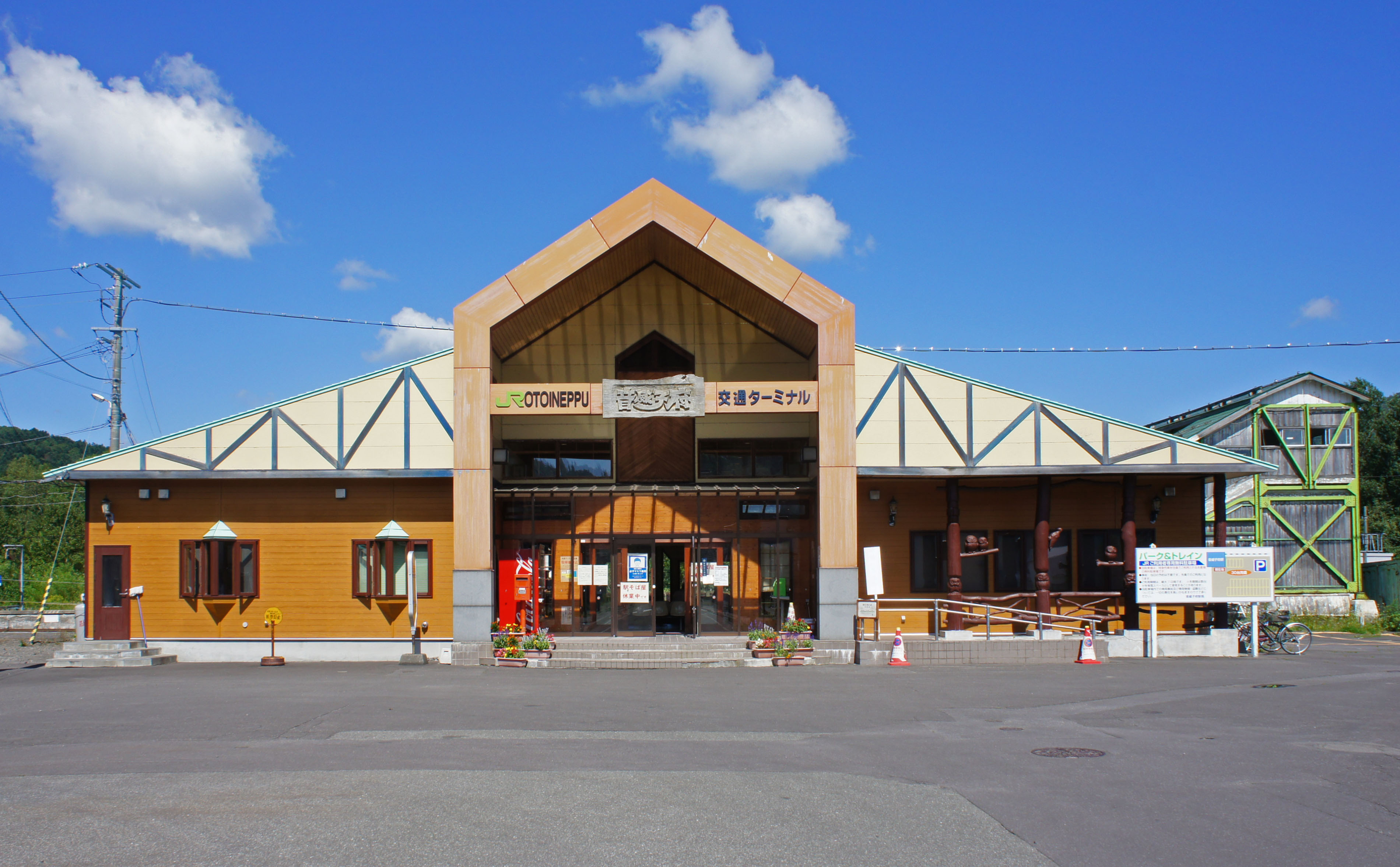
- Otoineppu Station (August 2020)

General information
- Location: 509 Otoineppu, Otoineppu-mura, Nakagawa-gun, Hokkaido 098-2501; Japan
- Coordinates: 44°41′34″N 142°16′3″E
- System: regional rail
- Operator: JR Hokkaido
- Line: Sōya Main Line
- Distance: 129.3 km (80.3 mi) from Asahikawa
- Platforms: 1 side platform
- Train operators: JR Hokkaido

Construction
- Structure type: At grade

Other information
- Status: Staffed (Midori no Madoguchi)
- Station code: W61
- Website: Official website

History
- Opened: 5 November 1912

Passengers
- FY2023: 20 (daily)

Services
Preceding station	JR Hokkaido	Following station
Osashima towards Wakkanai	Sōya Main Line Local	Sakkuru towards Asahikawa
Teshio-Nakagawa towards Wakkanai	Sōya Main Line Limited Express Soya / Sarobetsu	Bifuka towards Asahikawa
Location
- Location within Hokkaido Location within Japan

Otoineppu Station (音威子府駅, Otoineppu-eki) is a railway station located in the village of Otoineppu, Nakagawa District (Teshio), Hokkaidō, Japan. It is operated by JR Hokkaido.

== Lines ==
The station is served by the 259.4 km (161.2 mi) Soya Main Line from Asahikawa to Wakkanai and is located 129.3 km from the starting point of the line at Asahikawa.

== Layout ==
Otoineppu Station is an above-ground station with one side platform and one island platform. Platform 1 has a short effective length and is only used by local trains. A footbridge is used to move between platforms. The station is staffed and has a Midori no Madoguchi staffed ticket office. There are no ticket vending machines, and local tickets and admission tickets must be purchased at the Midori no Madoguchi. After the Tenpoku Line was abolished, the wooden station building was remodeled into the current station building using the budget of Otoineppu Village. Next to the station building is the office of the Nayoro Track Maintenance Office Otoineppu Track Maintenance Management Office. The station building also serves as a bus waiting room. There is also a "Tenpoku Line Reference Room" where materials related to the Tenpoku Line are exhibited.

=== Platforms ===
1	■ Sōya Main Line	for Wakkanai and Asahikawa (Local service)
2	■ Sōya Main Line	for Wakkanai (Limited Express)
4	■ Sōya Main Line	for Asahikawa (Limited Express)

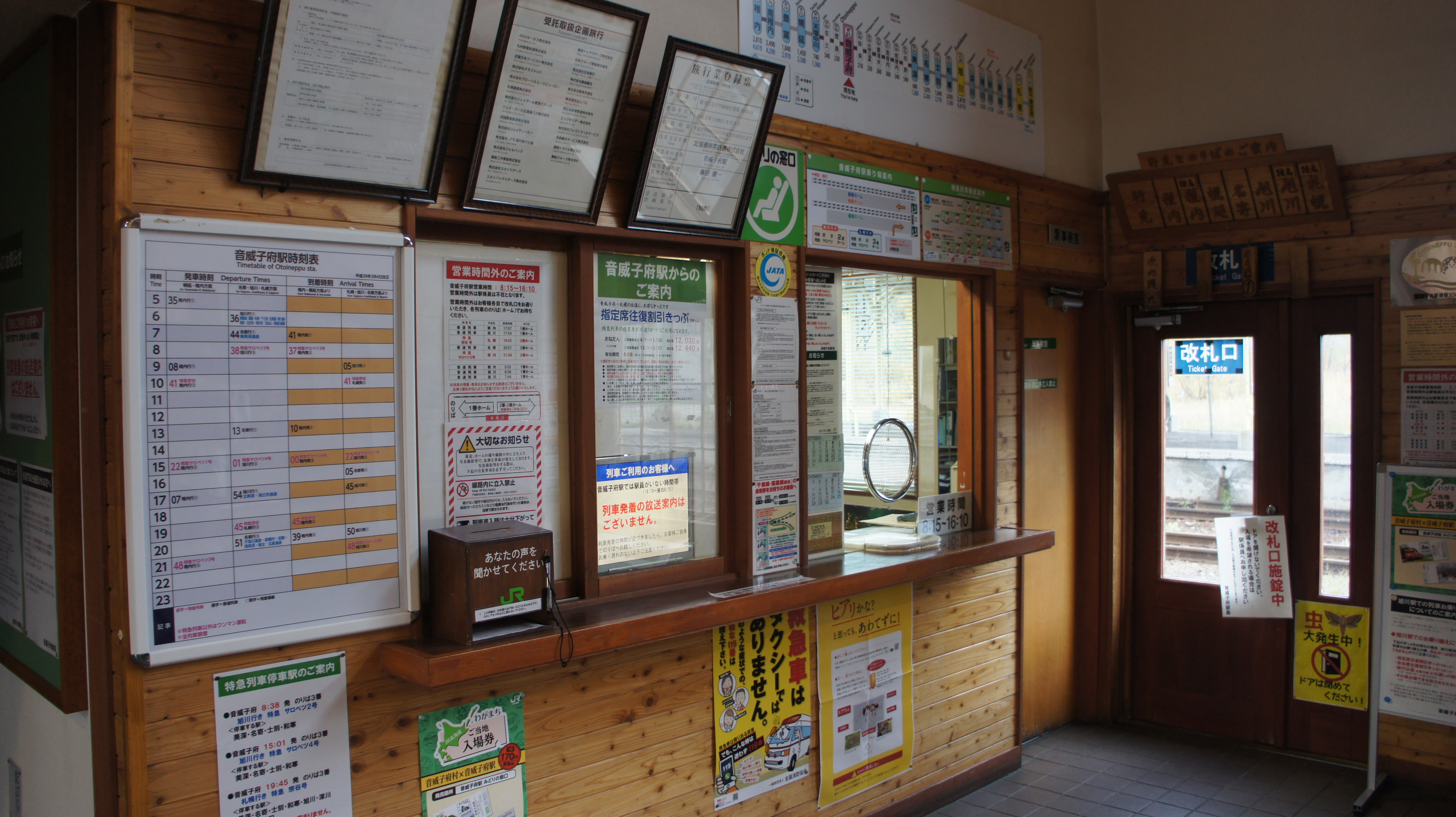
Ticket gate

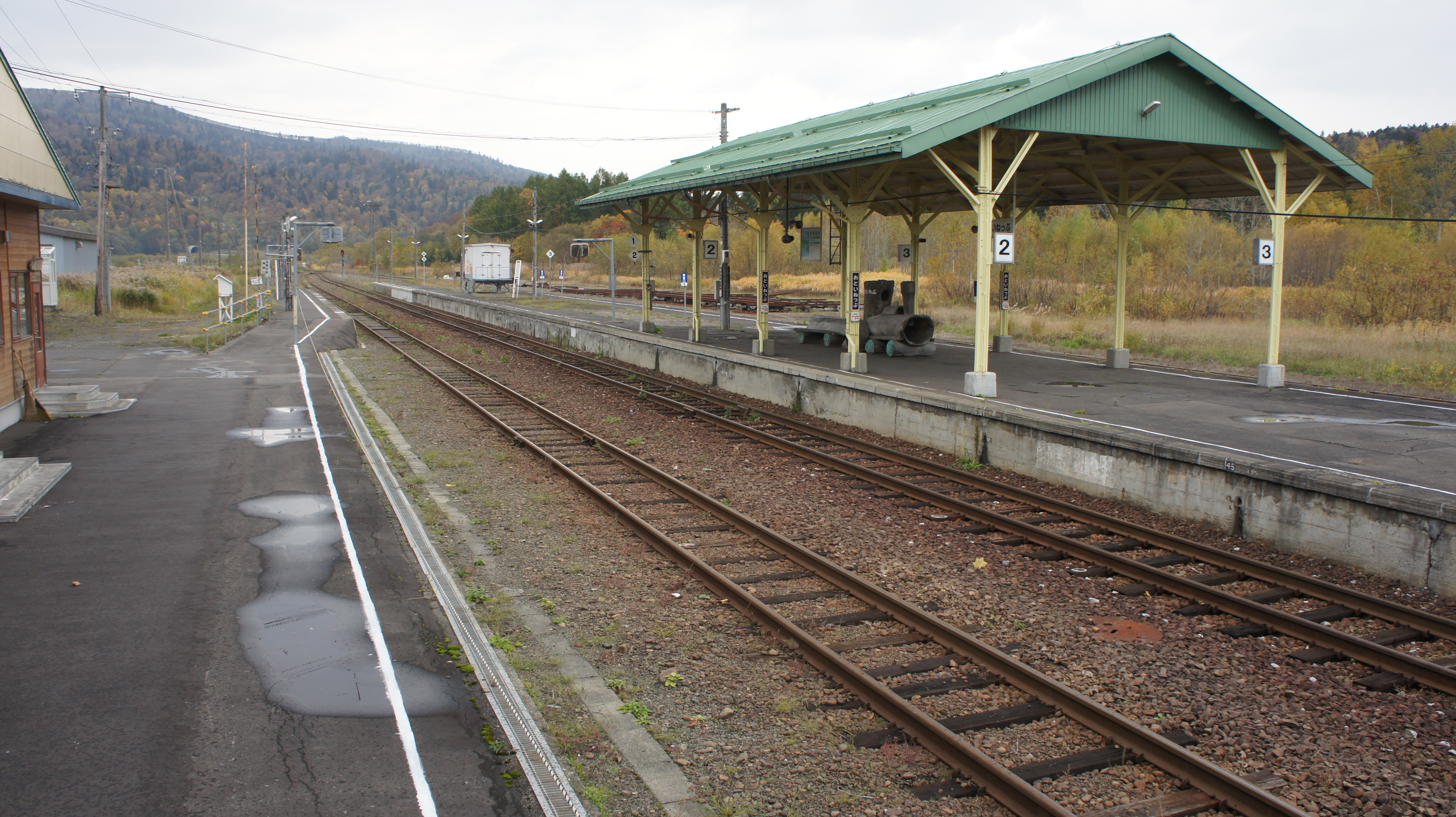
Platform

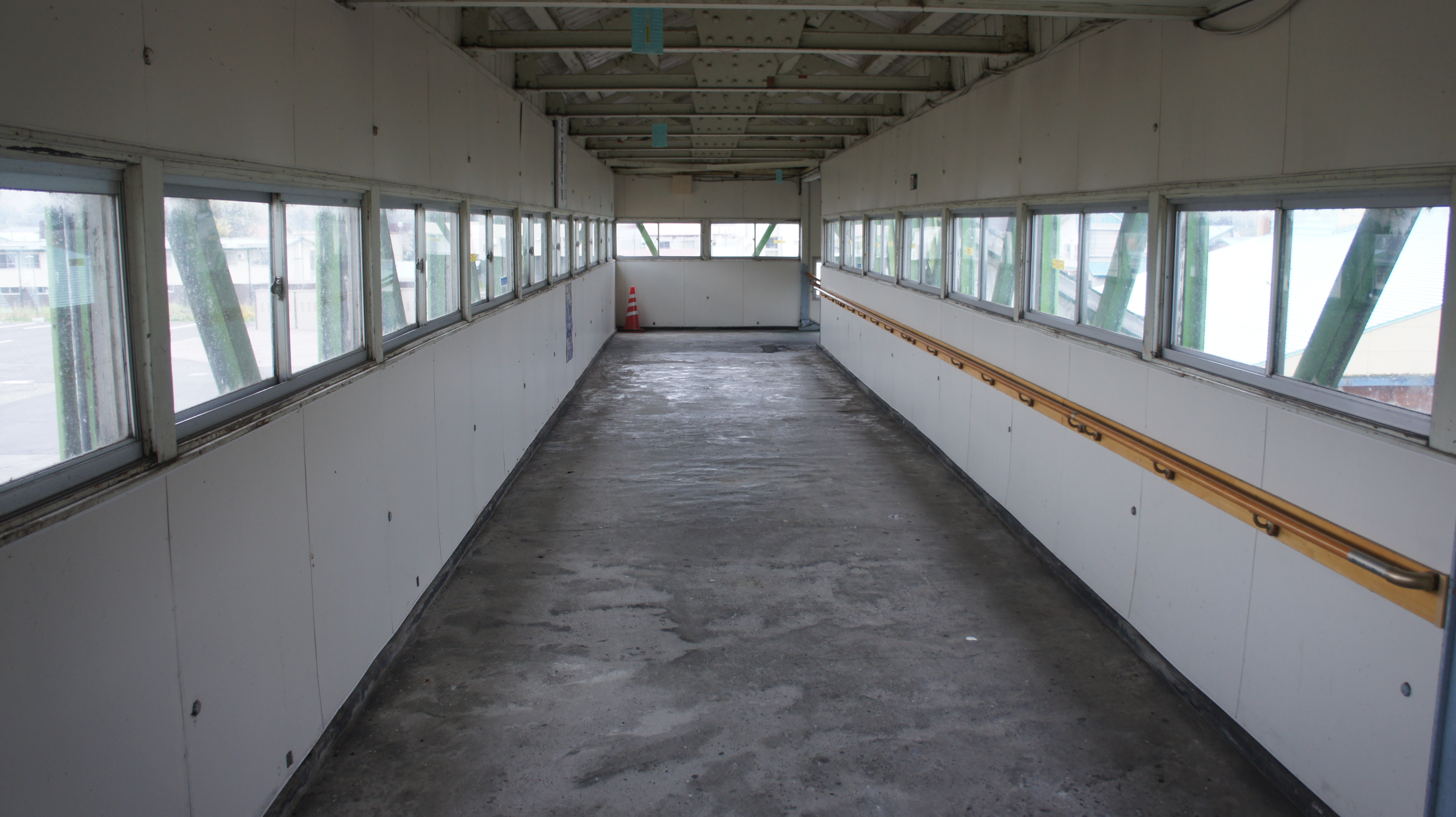
Footbridge

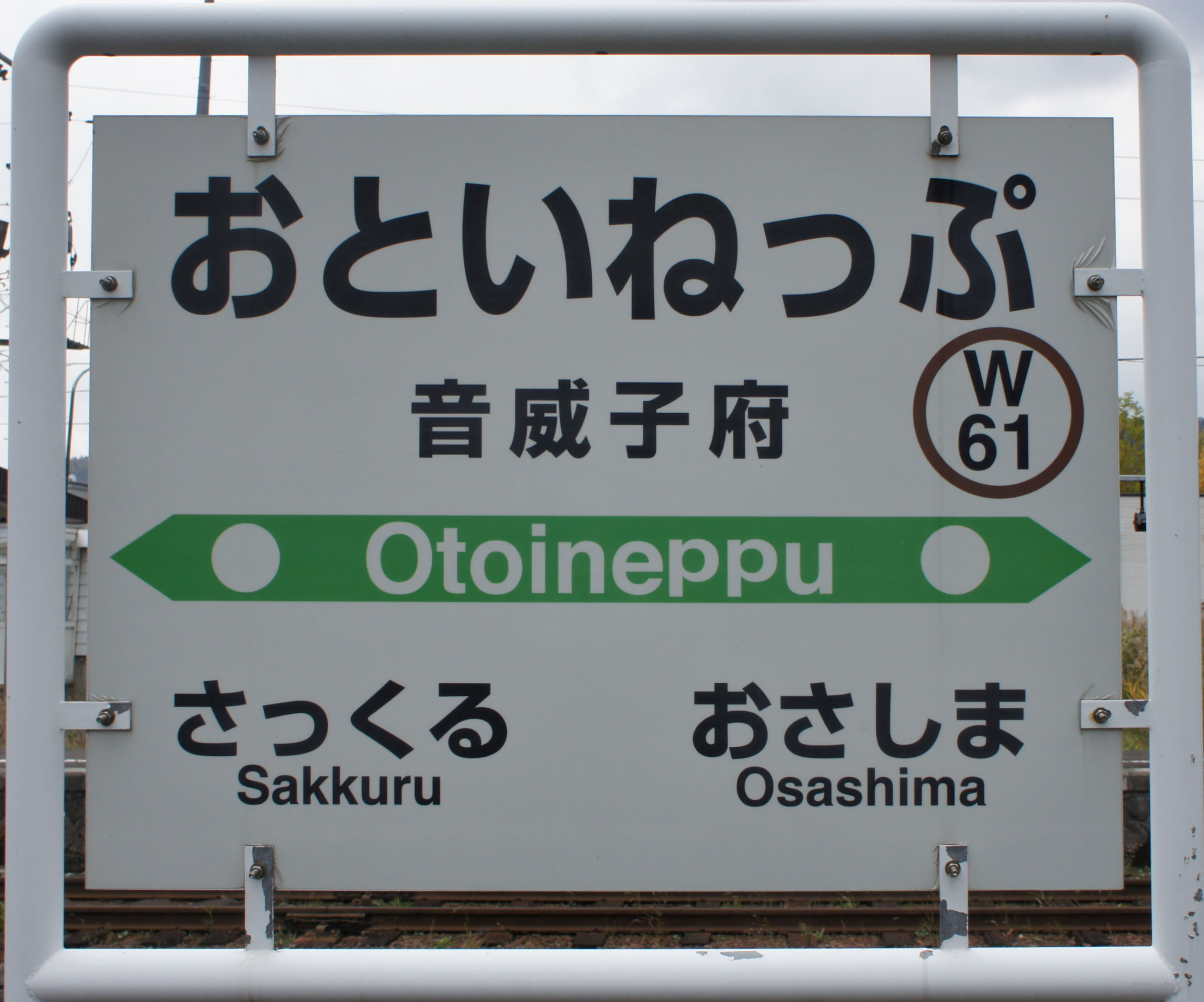
Signage

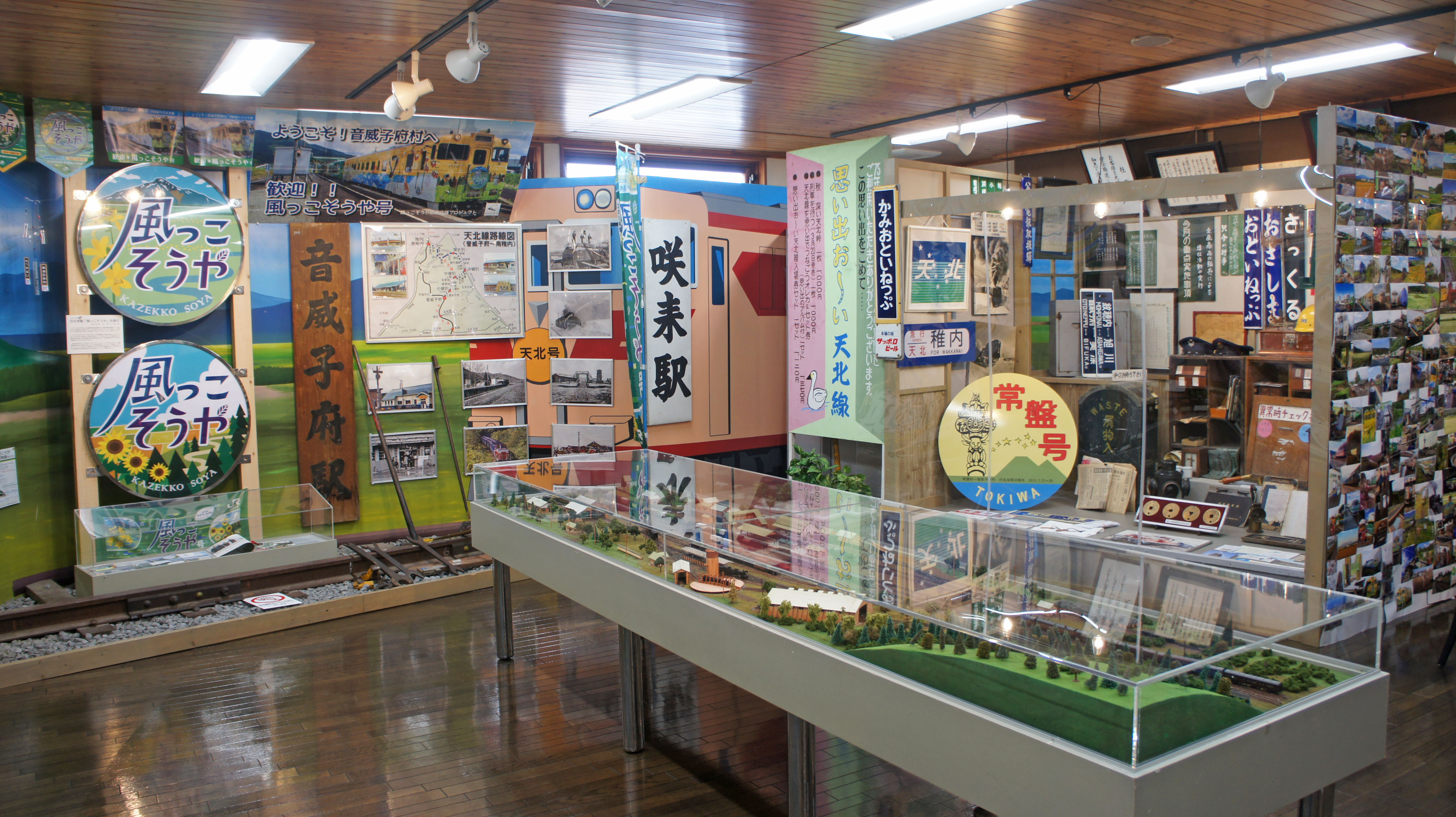
Tempoku Line Reference library

== History ==
Otoineppu Station opened on 5 November 1912. With the privatization of Japanese National Railways (JNR) on 1 April 1987, the station came under the control of JR Hokkaido.

== Passenger statistics ==
In FY2023, the station was used on average by 20 passengers daily. (Note: Data published by the Ministry of Land, Infrastructure, Transport and Tourism state the number of passengers boarding and disembarking by station in a given year. FY2023 covers the period from 1 April 2023 to 31 March 2024. Data published by individual railways directly may state the number boarding only.)

== Surrounding area ==
- Japan National Route 40
- Otoineppu Village Office

== See also ==
- List of railway stations in Japan
