= Kitami Province =

Former province of Japan

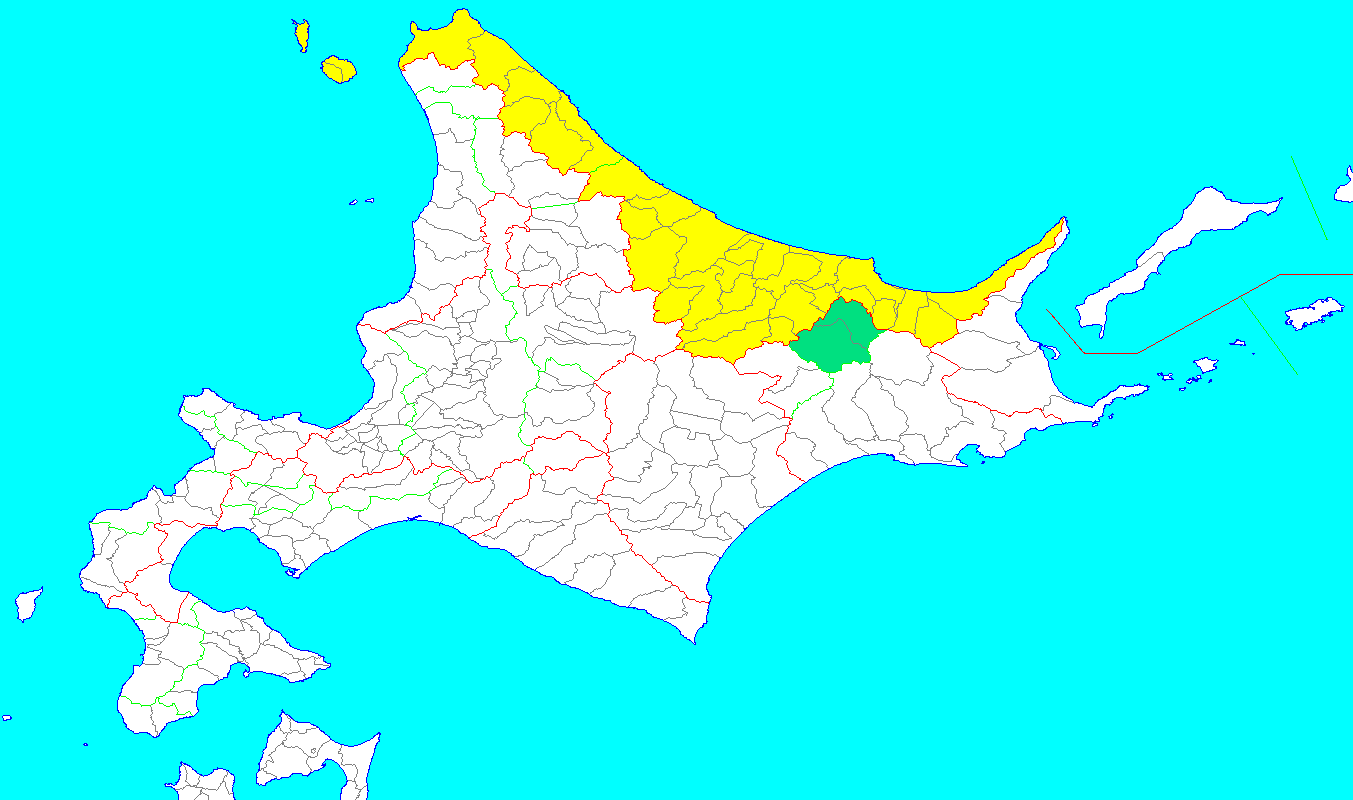
Location of Kitami Province c. 1869. Green highlighted area is Abashiri District from Kushiro Province c. 1881.

Kitami Province (北見国, Kitami no Kuni; Japanese pronunciation: [k̟ʲi̥.tä́.mʲì (nò̞ kɯ̈̀.ɲ̟ì)]) was a short-lived province located in Hokkaido. It corresponded to modern-day Sōya Subprefecture and Okhotsk Subprefecture minus part of Abashiri District.

== History ==
After 1869, the northern Japanese island was known as Hokkaido; and regional administrative subdivisions were identified, including Kitami Province.

- August 15, 1869 Kitami Province established with 8 districts
- 1872 Census finds a population of 1,511
- July 1881 Abashiri District (網尻郡) incorporated for Abashiri District (網走郡) from Kushiro Province
- 1882 Provinces dissolved in Hokkaidō

== Districts ==
- Sōya (宗谷郡)
- Rishiri (利尻郡)
- Rebun (礼文郡)
- Esashi (枝幸郡)
- Monbetsu (紋別郡)
- Tokoro (常呂郡)
- Abashiri (網走郡)
- Shari (斜里郡)
