= Rebun =

Rebun may refer to several locations in Hokkaidō prefecture, Japan:

- Rebun Island (礼文島), an island of Japan
  - Rebun, Hokkaidō (礼文町), a town on the island, which consists of the entire island
  - Rebun District, Hokkaidō (礼文郡), a district which the town belongs to
  - Mount Rebun (礼文岳), a mountain on the island
- Rebun (礼文町), an ōaza (大字) of Rausu, Hokkaidō on the Shiretoko peninsula
- Rebun Station in Hokkaidō
