= Rebun Airport =

Airport in Rebun, Hokkaido, Japan

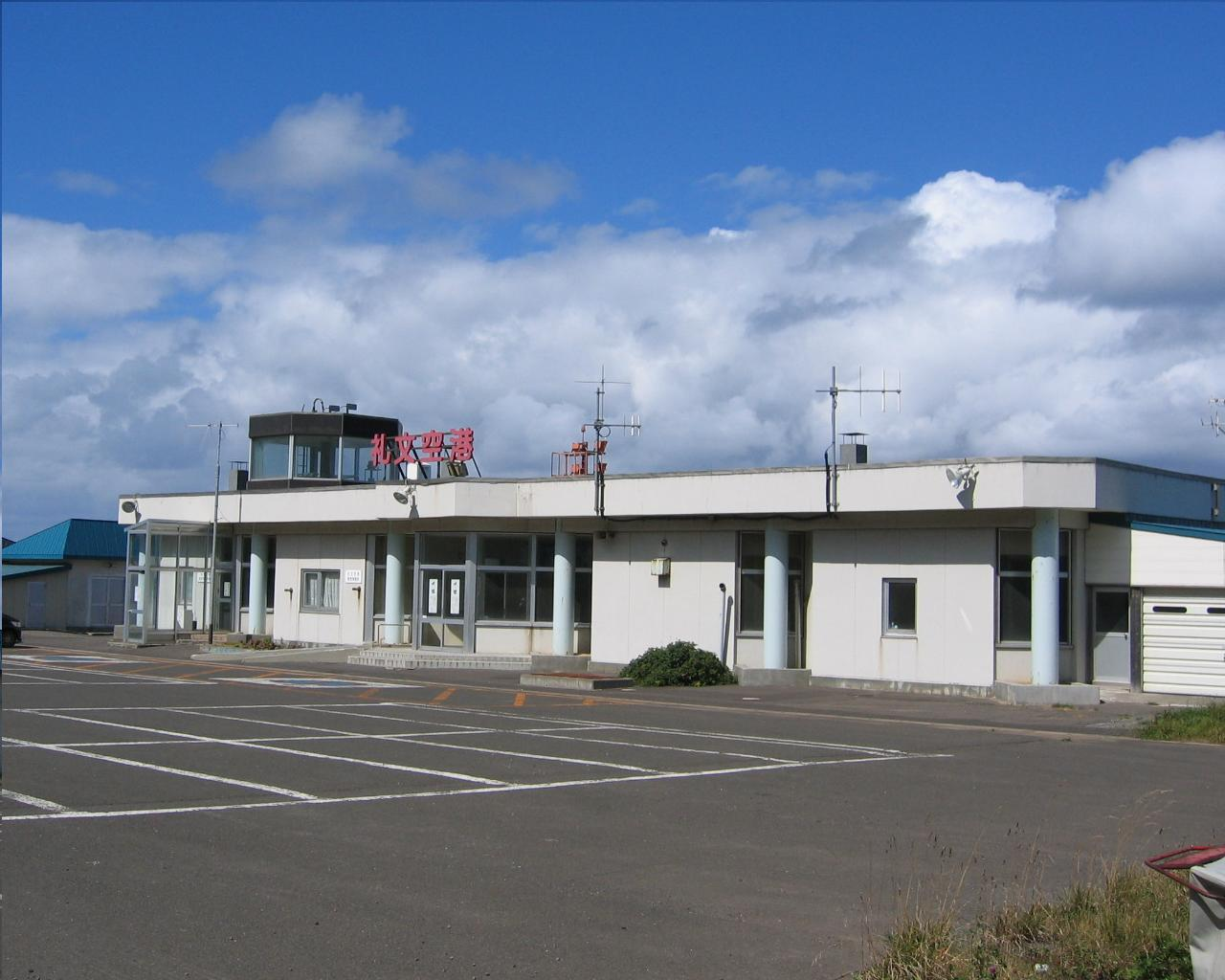
- IATA: RBJ; ICAO: RJCR

Summary
- Airport type: Public
- Operator: Hokkaido
- Location: Rebun, Japan
- Elevation AMSL: 85 ft (26 m)
- Coordinates: 45°27′18″N 141°02′21″E

Map
- Location within Hokkaido Location within Japan

Runways
Direction	Length		Surface
Direction	m	ft	Surface
14/32	1,000	3,281	Asphalt concrete
- Source: Japanese AIP at AIS Japan

Rebun Airport (礼文空港, Rebun Kūkō) (IATA: RBJ, ICAO: RJCR) is an unused airport located in the town of Rebun, on Rebun Island in Hokkaido, Japan.

== History ==
The airport opened in June 1978 and closed on April 9, 2009. Prior to the airport's closure, Air Nippon and later, Air Hokkaido operated a daily flight from Wakkanai before the route was terminated on April 1, 2003. As of 2025, the airport has no scheduled flights and remains closed.
