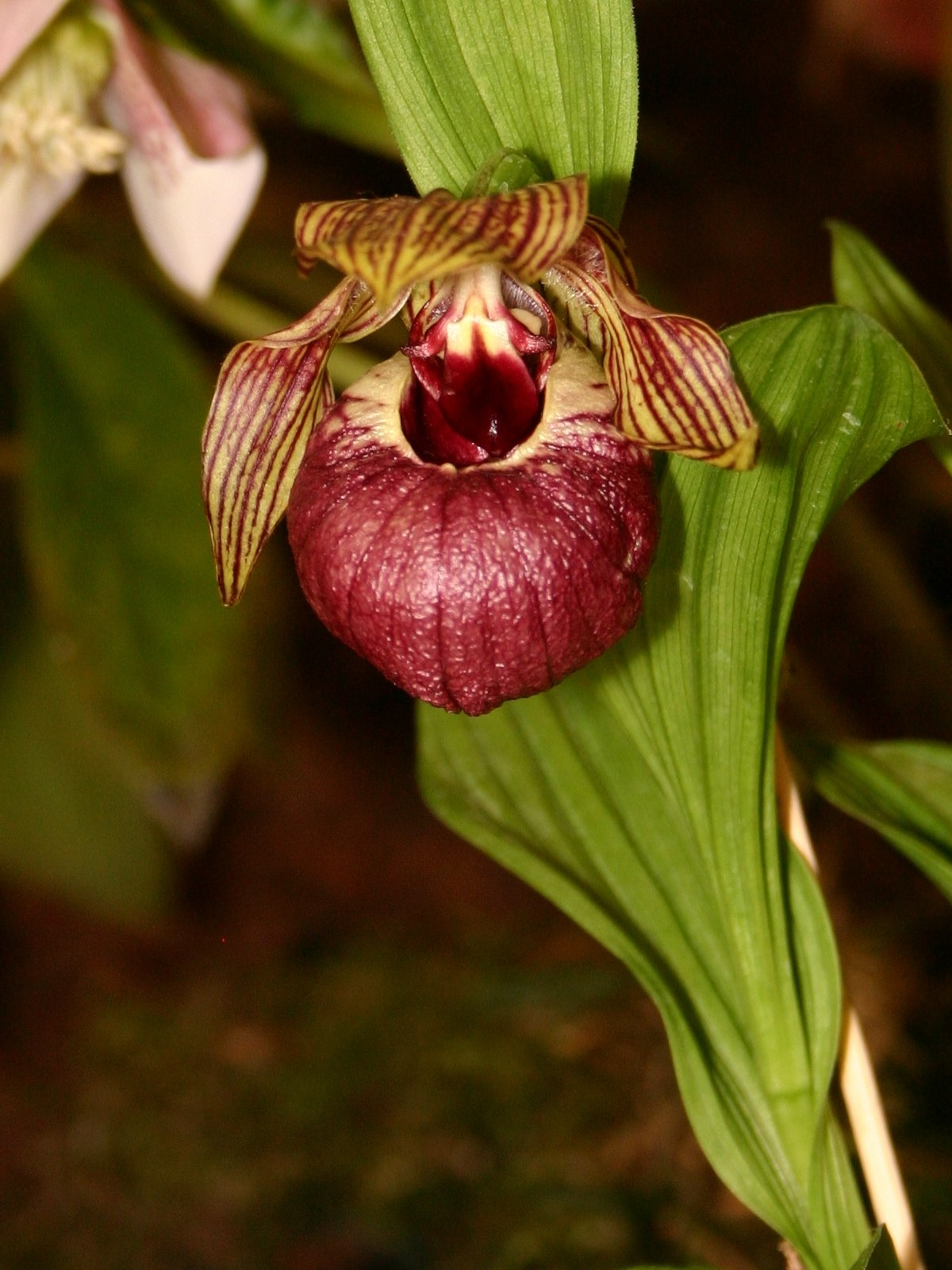

Scientific classification
- Kingdom: Plantae
- Clade: Tracheophytes
- Clade: Angiosperms
- Clade: Monocots
- Order: Asparagales
- Family: Orchidaceae
- Subfamily: Cypripedioideae
- Genus: Cypripedium
- Species: C. tibeticum

Binomial name
- Cypripedium tibeticum King ex Rolfe (1892)

Synonyms
- Cypripedium corrugatum Franch. (1894); Cypripedium corrugatum var. obesum Franch. (1894); Cypripedium macranthos var. tibeticum (King ex Rolfe) Kraenzl. (1897); Cypripedium langrhoa Costantin (1919); Cypripedium lanuginosum Schltr. 1919; Cypripedium compactum Schltr. (1922) illegitimate; Cypripedium froschii Perner 1999; Cypripedium tibeticum var. froschii (Perner) Eccarius 2009

= Cypripedium tibeticum =

Species of orchid

Cypripedium tibeticum is a species of slipper orchid in the section Cypripedium in the subsec. Macrantha It is native to Bhutan, Sikkim, and Western China (Gansu, Guizhou, Sichuan, Tibet, Yunnan).

== Description ==
C. tibeticum reaches a height of 13-35 cm. Its leaves are 3, 7-15 cm by 3.3-7.2 cm and are glabrous (lacking hairs) on both surfaces except towards the tips. Each inflorescence carries one flower, produced usually before the leaves have fully developed, and the bract sheathing the pedicel is 5–10.5 cm long. The flower is sub-nodding and very variable in colour from deep maroon to pink. The ovary is glabrous or rarely slightly pubescent or papillose towards the apex, 2–3.2 cm long. The sepals are 3–5.2 cm by 1.8-3 cm, and the petals are 3.6-6 cm by 1.4-2.5 cm. The pouched labellum is 3.5-6 cm long and wide, and the margins of the mouth are crimped all around, the outer surface usually wrinkled. Flowering occurs from May to July.

This species is notably variable across its distribution and sometimes it is hard to distinguish from other species such as Cypripedium macranthos or Cypripedium calcicola. The main distinction from C. macranthos is the darker flower colour, especially when dried-pressed.

== Distribution and habitat ==
C. tibeticum occurs in Sikkim, Bhutan and western China (Xizang, Yunnan, Sichuan and possibly S. Gansu). It grows in open montane meadows, margins of coniferous and mixed woodlands, open limestone ledges and screes at elevations of 2300-4600 m. These plants usually form large clumps or colonies.

== Taxonomy and naming ==
Seven specimens collected in southeastern Xizang may suggest natural hybridisation with Cypripedium himalaicum. This orchid is also a parent of Cypripedium × wenqingiae, an hybrid between C. farreri and C. tibeticum.

== Cultivation ==
Together with its close relatives, this species replaces C. macranthos in southwestern China and the Himalayan region, and requires growing conditions similar to the latter in some respects. It differs in being more adapted to continental high mountain regions. Hence it needs some protection in winter, especially during frost-free periods, to maintain dormancy. It should not receive too much rain in winter. In summer, it needs constant watering and a fresh and cool atmosphere while receiving full light (avoid the burning sun around noon). It can acclimatise in gardens, but will not grow into big clumps nor become as persistent as C. macranthos. In the wild it is found growing in grassland on limestone and should have a compost with a pH between 6 and 7. It is not a beginner's species. Mixes A, B, C, D (made with coarse sand and some oyster shells), and J.

Mix A: One part loam pellets, one part Seramis (or comparable materials like pumice gravel), one part rotten wood, and one part coarse sand.

Mix	Formulae
Mix A	One part loam pellets, one part Seramis (or comparable materials like pumice gravel), one part rotten wood, and one part coarse sand.
Mix B	Pure washed pumice gravel or lava gravel 3-8 mm diameter.
Mix C	Pure ungraded pumice gravel (unwashed).
Mix D	Four to five parts fine dune sand (from inland dunes) and one part fen soil (muck). Add just enough fen soil to make the sand dark grey. With calcareous-growing species, if lime-free sand is used, powder with agricultural lime (preferably dolomitic) over the surface every autumn.
Mix J	Two parts gravel, one part perlite, and one part fine fir bark. To lift the pH into the neutral range, if needed, add ½ part oyster shells.

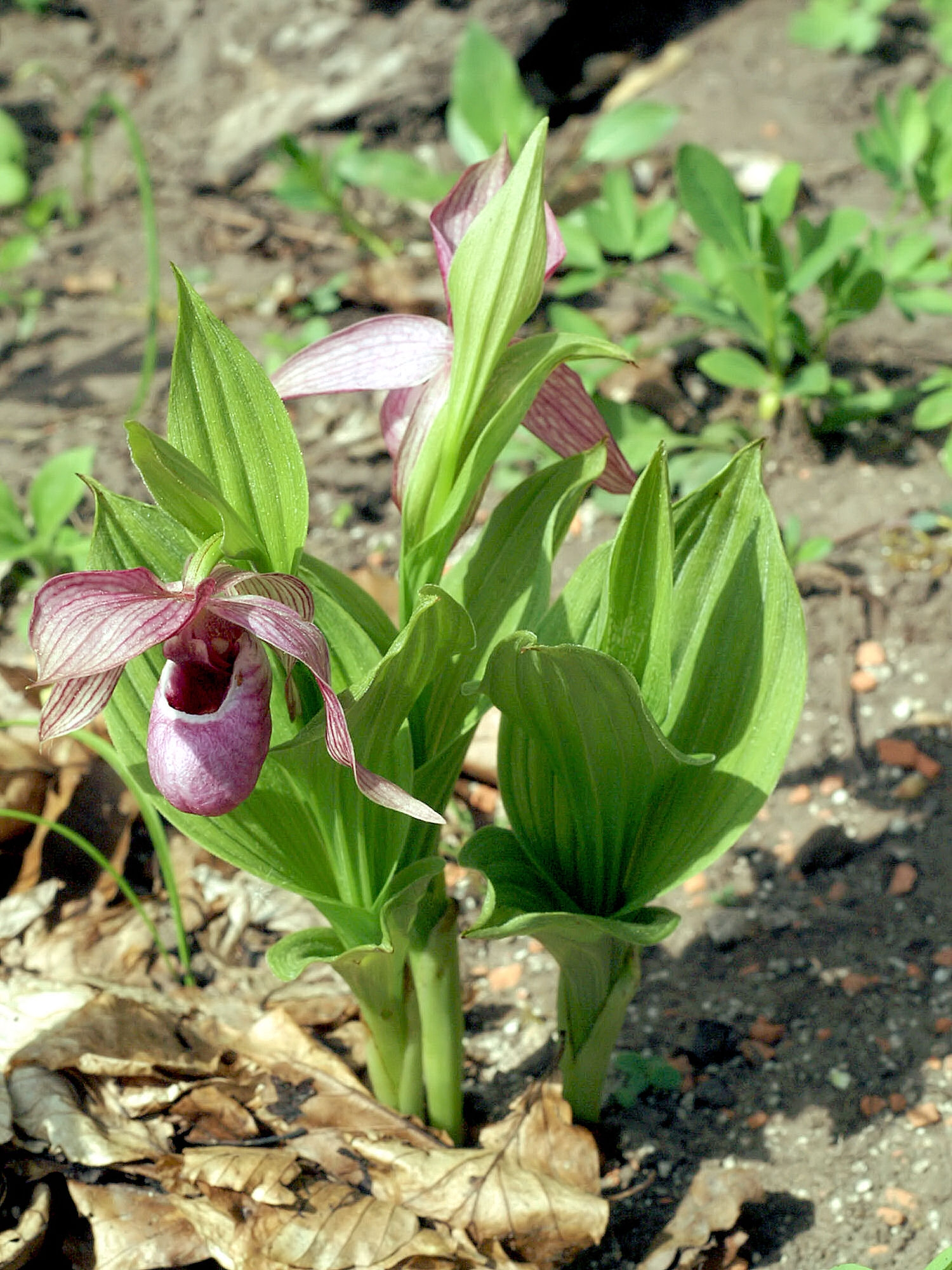
Flower showing variation and plant habit.

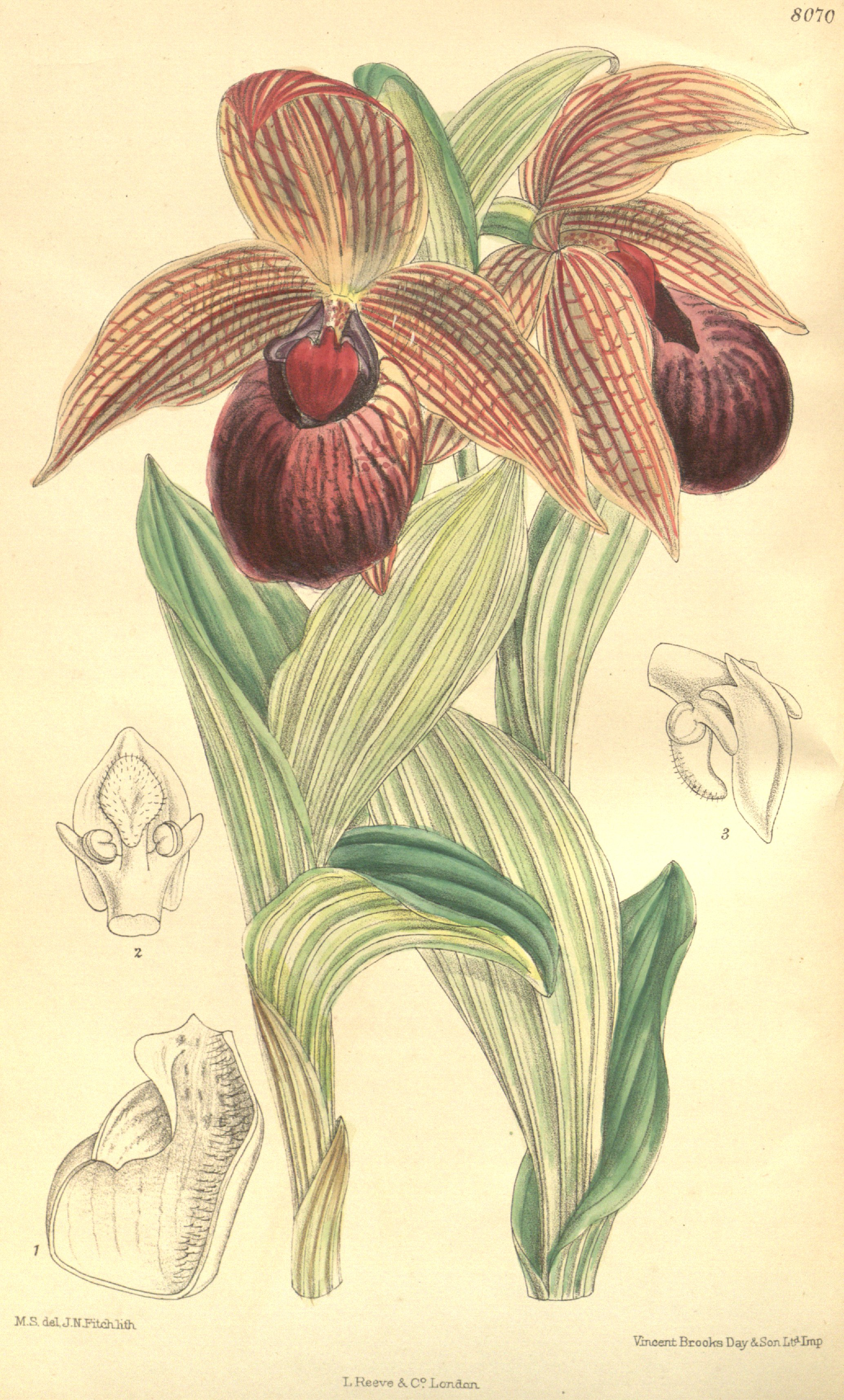
"Curtis's Botanical Magazine" vol. 132 (Ser. 4 no. 2) tab. 8070, M. S. del. ( = Matilda Smith, 1854–1926), J. N. Fitch lith. ( = John Nugent Fitch, 1840–1927)

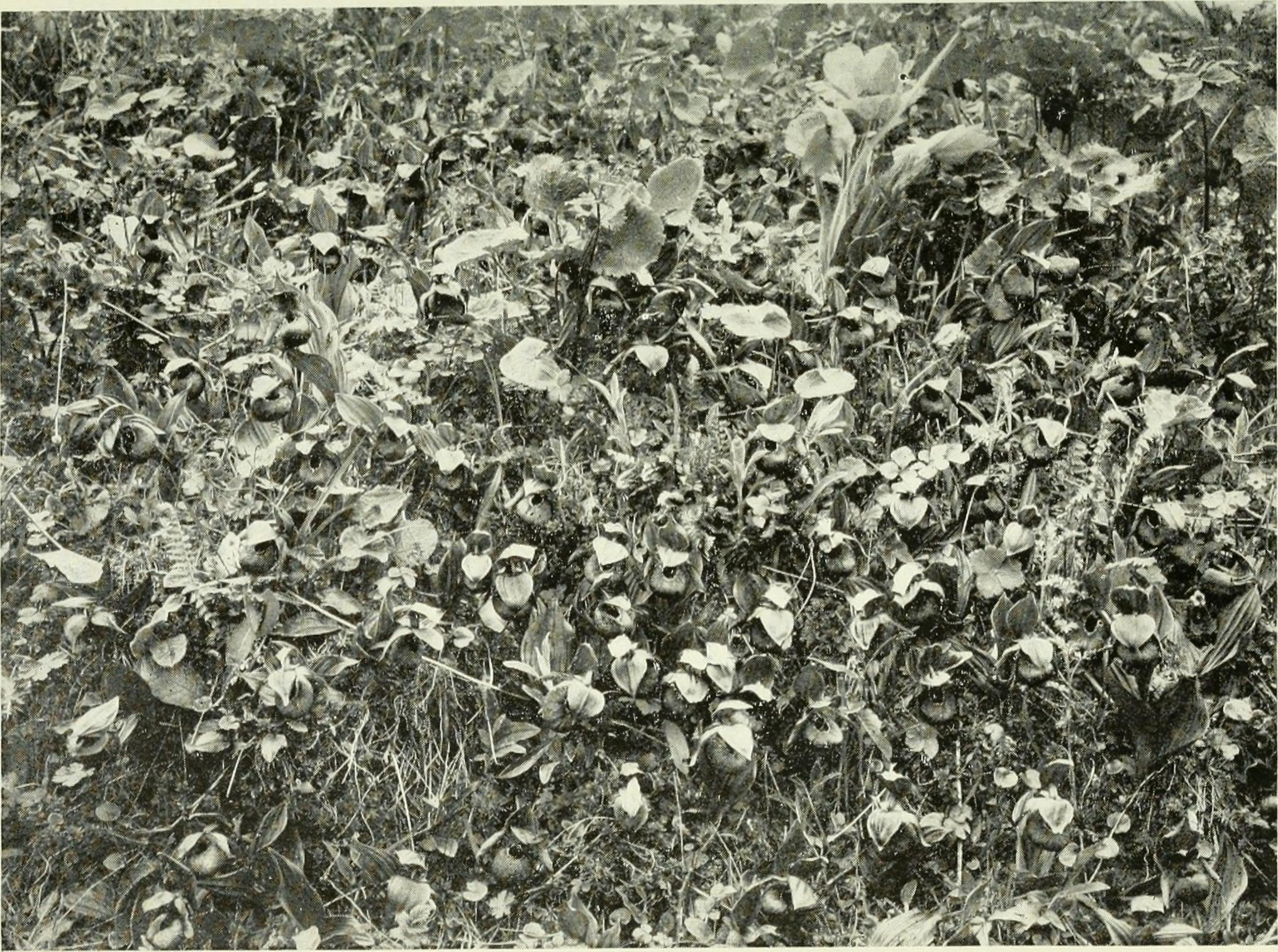
Large number of specimens in a colony, 1913.
