= Port of Wakkanai =

Port in Hokkaido Prefecture, Japan

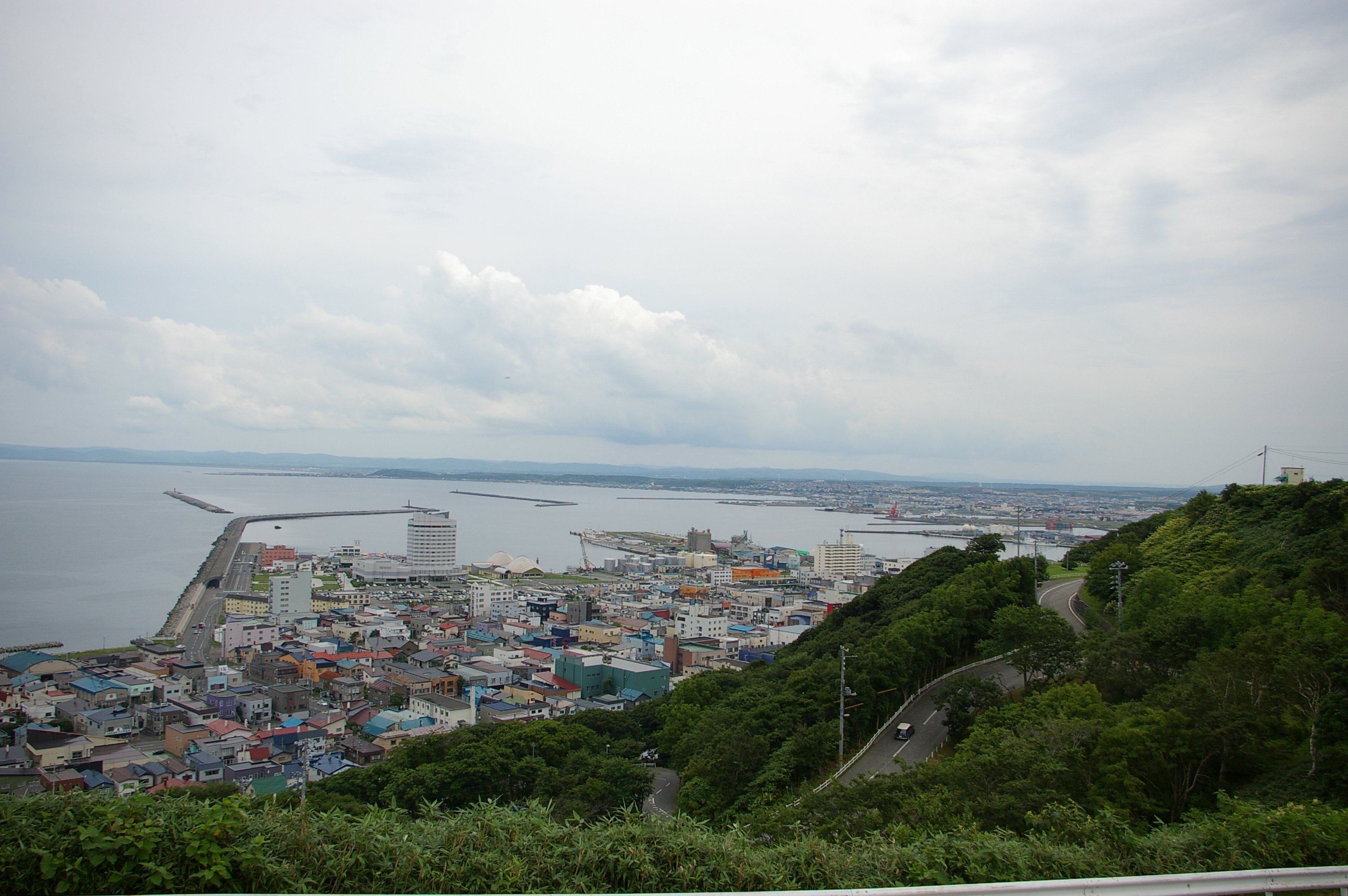
- View of Wakkanai Port from Wakkanai Park
- Interactive map of Port of Wakkanai
- Location within Japan

Location
- Country: Japan
- Location: Wakkanai, Hokkaido Prefecture
- Coordinates: 45.415156°N 141.682957°E

Details
- Opened: 1948
- Owned by: Wakkanai
- Type of Harbor: Seaport
- Size: 1,800 ha
- No. of wharfs: 5

Statistics
- Vessel arrivals: 6,260
- Annual cargo tonnage: 1,577,538
- Passenger traffic: 333,716
- Website; Port of Wakkanai

The Port of Wakkanai (稚内港) is a major port located in the Municipality of Wakkanai, Hokkaido Prefecture, Japan. Sakhalin lies about 62.81 kilometers (39.03 mi) to the north. Many ferries that go/come to/from Rishiri Island, Rebun Island and stop in Sakhalin in Russia. It is also a distribution center for industrial materials and essential items for residents in the North of Hokkaido. Otherwise, the port is a base for inshore and offshore fisheries, and the port plays a role in Sakhalin-III. In 2007, the port was registered as Minato Oasis (みなとオアシス), and it was named "Minato Oasis Wakkanai" (みなとオアシスわっかない) by the Ministry of Land, Infrastructure, Transport and Tourism.

== Lanes ==
These lanes depart from Wakkanai International Ferry Terminal (also known as Wakkanai Ferry Terminal). It is located in the Port of Wakkanai.

Domestic lanes
| Lane Name | Via | Destination | Company |
|---|---|---|---|
| Wakkanai-Oshidomari Line | Nonstop | Rishiri Island | Heart Land Ferry |
| Wakkanai-Kafuka Line | Nonstop | Rebun Island | Heart Land Ferry |

International lanes
| Lane Name | Via | Destination | Company | Note |
|---|---|---|---|---|
| Sakhalin Line | Nonstop | Korsakov, Sakhalin Oblast | Sakhalin Shipping Company | Suspended in 2019 |

== History ==
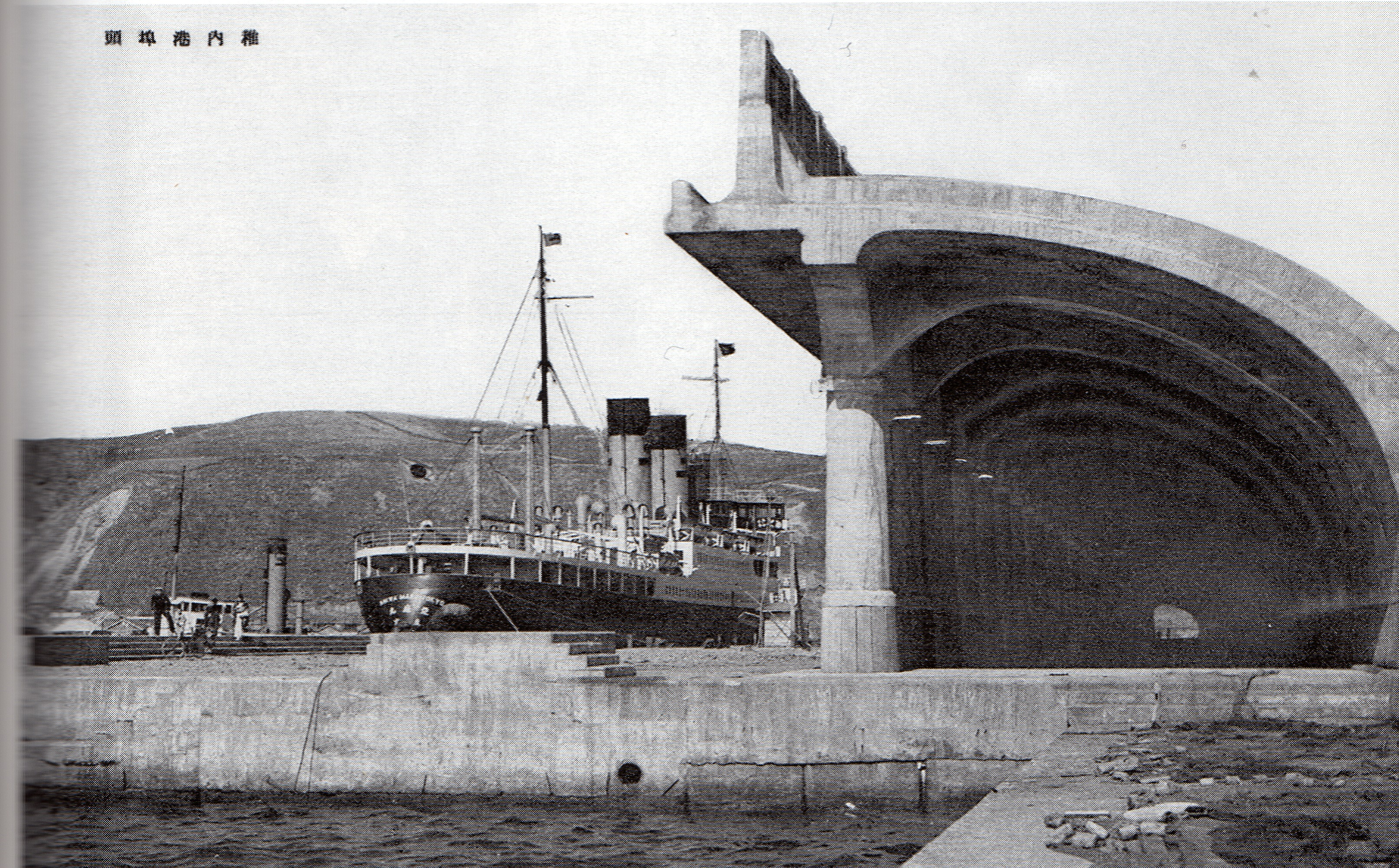
Wakkanai Port and Ferry in front of North Breakwater Dome

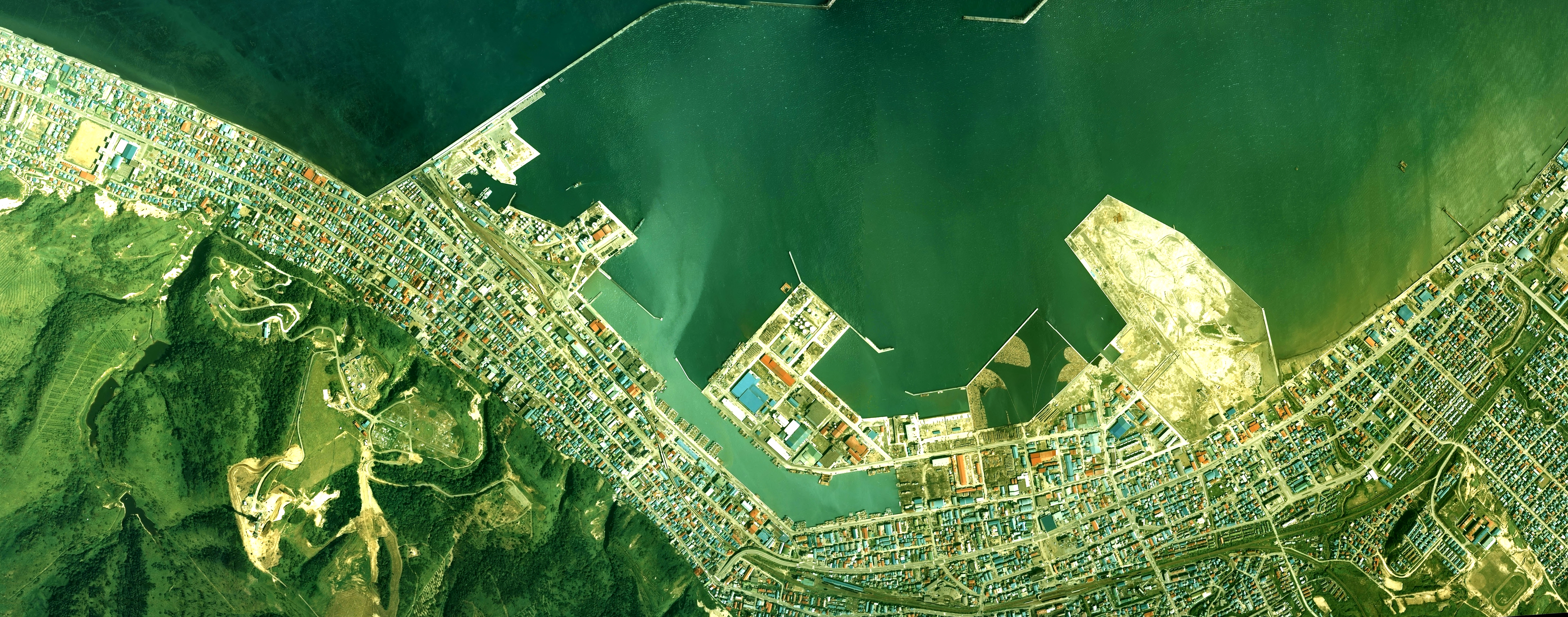
Aerial photo overlooking the Port of Wakkanai taken in 1977

Wakkanai Port originated when the Matsumae Domain Lords established facilities for paying taxes during the Edo era of Japan. In the Meiji era, the port was regarded as an example of the cultivation of Hokkaido. Moreover, the port helped in developing the neighboring city of Wakkanai, which provided access to Karafuto after the Russo-Japanese War.

=== Sakhalin lane ===
In 1989, the lanes, was commenced operating for the first time after World War II, were bound for Kholmsk where is known as "Maoka" (真岡) in Japanese. In 1991, the lanes exclusively for tourists departed for Korsakov, known as "Ōtomari" (大泊) in Japanese. However, the lanes have not been operated since 1995, and was discontinued in 2015. A new public-private sector ferry company was established by Wakkanai and the Sakhalin Shipping Company in 2016. That ferry lane has been operated between August and September.

International ferry services across the Soya Strait between the two towns were suspended since 2019. Efforts to reintroduce such services ended in 2022.

== Ground transportation ==
There is a bus stop located in front of the Wakkanai Ferry Terminal, connecting it to the rest of Hokkaido.

Bus routes
| Name | Via | Destination | Company | Note |
|---|---|---|---|---|
| Hamanasu & Wakkanai (express bus) | Non stop | Sapporo Station | Hokuto Kotsu; Soya Bus | |
| Airport bus | Wakkanai Station | Wakkanai Airport | Soya Bus | Get on the bus at 700 yen once |
| Soya Misaki·Kuko Line | Wakkanai Station·Cape Soya | Wakkanai Airport | Soya Bus | Runs only during Summer |

== Surrounding area ==
- Wakkanai Station

It takes about 7 minutes to travel from the port to Wakkanai Station on foot.
