= Soya Bus =

Bus company

Soya Bus Co., Ltd.
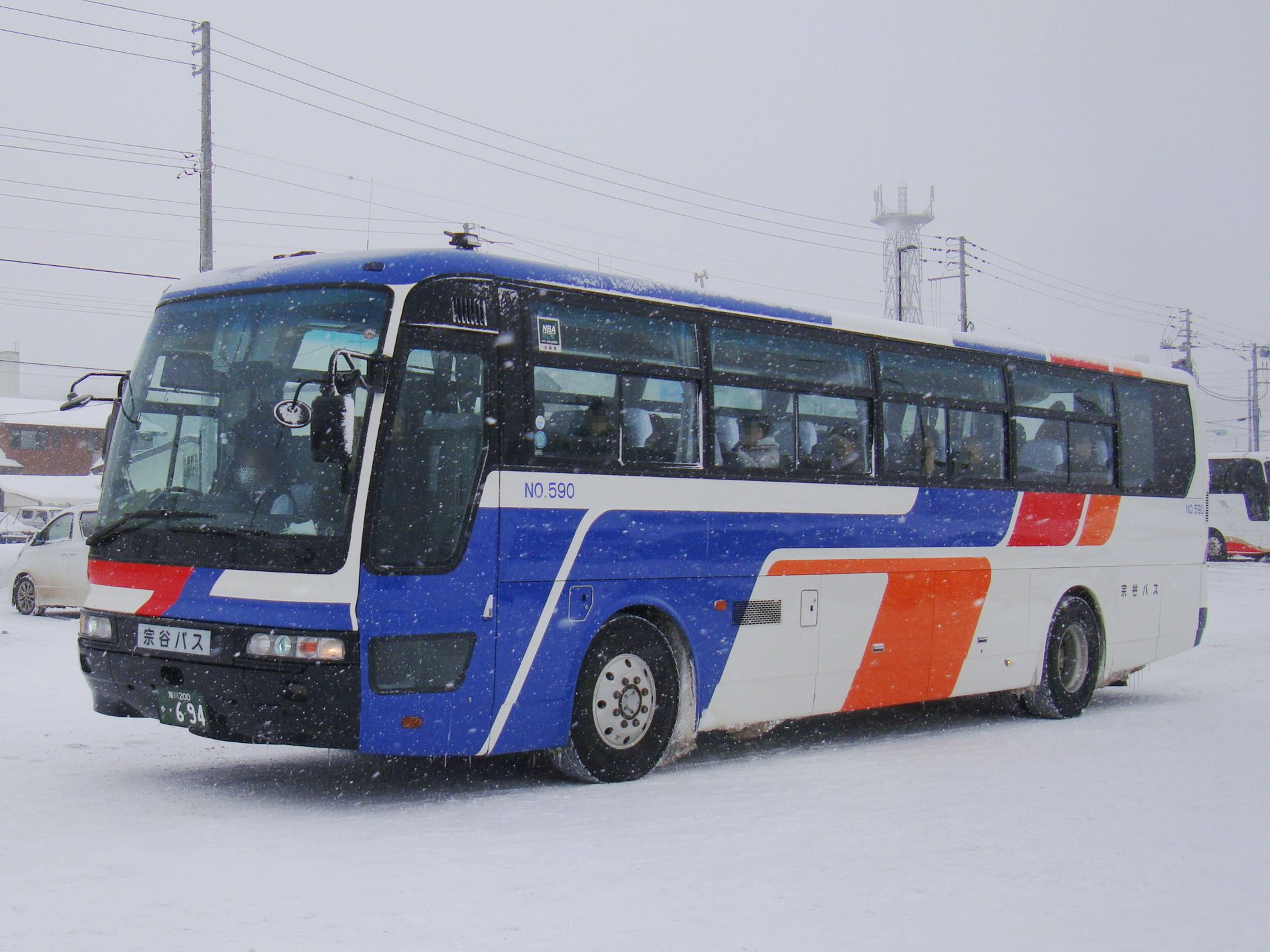
- A Soya Bus Aerobus (SS Mercury 109)
- Founded: 1952
- Headquarters: 5-2-23 Suehiro, Wakkanai, Hokkaido, Japan (北海道稚内市末広5丁目2番23号)
- Service area: Hokkaido
- Service type: Bus
- Fleet: 136 buses (as of July 2020)
- Chief executive: Naomi Nakaba
- Website: http://www.soyabus.co.jp/en/teikan

The Soya Bus Co., Ltd. (宗谷バス株式会社, Souya Basu Kabushiki-gaisha) is a Japanese bus company. It was established on 1 July 1952 to inherit part of the business of the Dohoku Bus.

== History ==
The SOYA bus operates around the northernmost part of Japan. The bus company belonged to Tokyu Group from 1959 until 2009.

=== Chronicle ===
- July 1952: Commenced operations
- August 1954: Established Omu Office
- 1956: Head office moved from Esashi, Hokkaido (Sōya) to Wakkanai, Hokkaido
- December 1959: Affiliated to Tokyu Corporation
- 1971: Discontinued Omu Office
- July 1985: Kohinhoku Line was discontinued
- May 1989: Tempoku Line was discontinued
- October 2010: Tokyu Corporation and Jōtetsu relinquished their shares, and transferred to Jay Will Partners. Company broke away from Tokyu Corporation

== Local bus services ==
=== Offices ===
- Wakkanai Office
- Rishiri Office (Rishiri Island)
- Rebun Office (Rebun Island)
- Esashi Office
- Sapporo Office

=== Wickets ===
- Wakkanai Bus Terminal
- Wakkanai Ferry Terminal
- Onishibetsu Bus Terminal
- Hamatonbetsu Bus Terminal
- Otoineppu Traffic Terminal
- Shiomi Wickets

== Route map ==
=== Express buses ===
NO	Terminus	Via	Terminus	Office	Note
WAKKANAI	Wakkanai Ferry Terminal	Wakkanai Station	Sapporo Station	Wakkanai Office	There is the first row seats exclusively for woman at the night service. Operated in step with Hokuto Bus
ESASHI ASAHIKAWA	Esashi Station	Shotombetsu, Otoineppu Station, Nayoro Station, Shibetsu Station	Asahikawa Station	Esashi Office	Operated in step with Dohoku Bus
ESASHI SAPPORO	Esashi Station	Shotombetsu, Otoineppu Station, Nayoro Station	Sapporo Station	Esashi Office	Operated in step with Dohoku Bus
TEMPOKU	Onishibetsu	Hamatombetsu, Nakatombetsu, Shotombetsu, Otoineppu Station, Nayoro Station, Shibetsu Station	Asahikawa Station	Esashi Office	

== Others ==
This bus company swapped employees for those who work for Horikawa Bus, Naha Bus and Ryukyu Bus since 2008. They also swapped their buses for Soya Buses. Soya Bus had company members travel to Horikawa Bus which operates around Fukuoka Prefecture and Naha Bus/Ryukyu Bus that operates around Okinawa Prefecture during summer because this company is not busy during summer. They travel to Soya Bus in Hokkaido during winter because snow is rare during winter around Kyushu region.

== See also ==
- Tokyu Group
  - Tokyu Corporation
  - Kusakaru Ueda Holdings
- Jay Coach
  - Kanto Transportation
