= Wakkanai Airport =

Airport in Wakkanai, Hokkaido, Japan

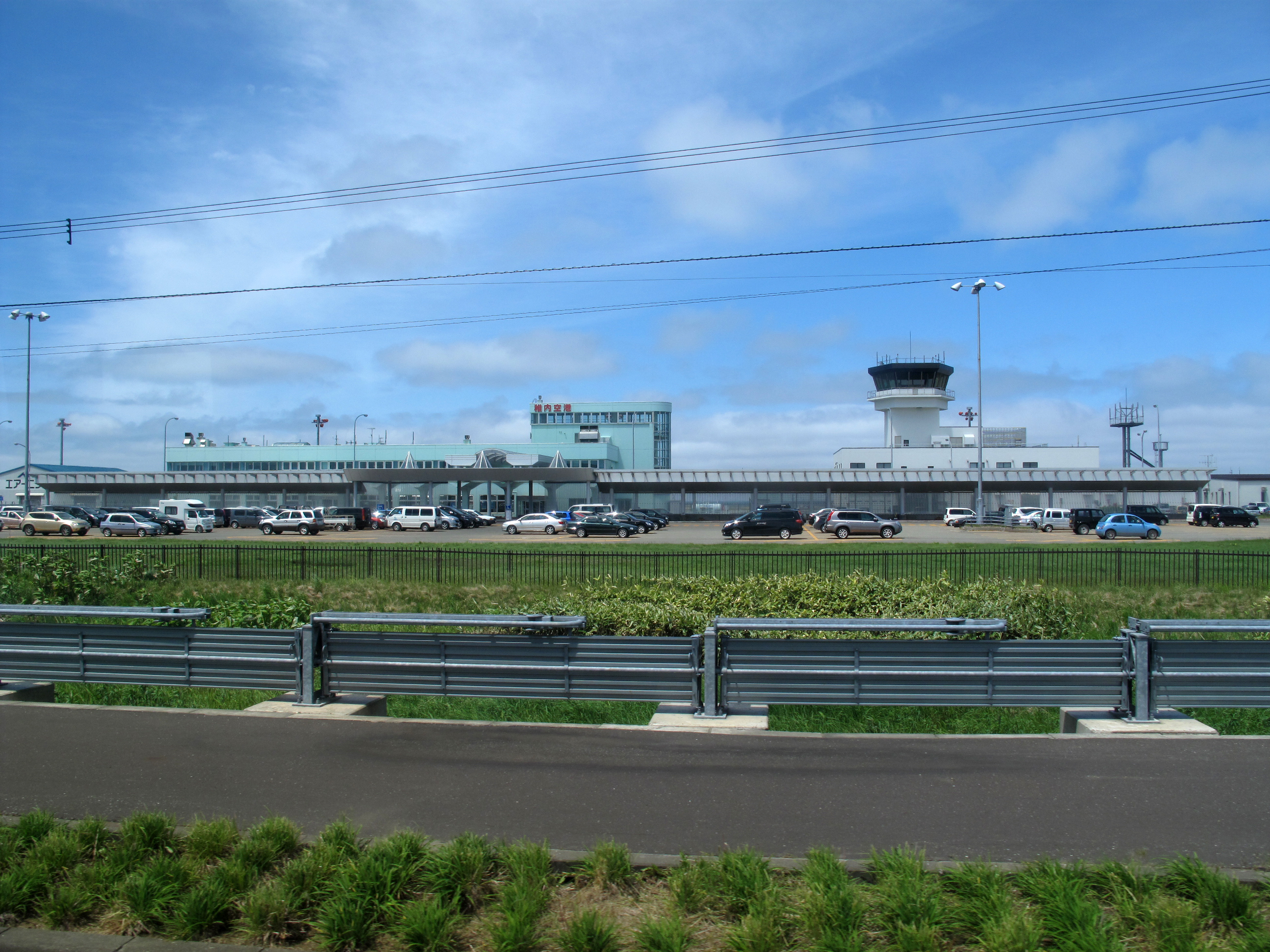
- IATA: WKJ; ICAO: RJCW

Summary
- Airport type: Public
- Owner: Ministry of Land, Infrastructure, Transport and Tourism
- Operator: Hokkaido Airports
- Location: Wakkanai
- Elevation AMSL: 27 ft (8.2 m)
- Coordinates: 45°24′16″N 141°48′08″E
- Website: http://www.wkj-airport.jp/

Map
- Location in Japan RJCW (Japan)

Runways
Direction	Length		Surface
Direction	m	ft	Surface
08/26	2,200	7,218	Asphalt

Statistics (2022)
- Passengers: 147,713
- Cargo (metric tonnes): 70.00
- Aircraft movement: 1,342
- Source: Japanese Ministry of Land, Infrastructure, Transport and Tourism

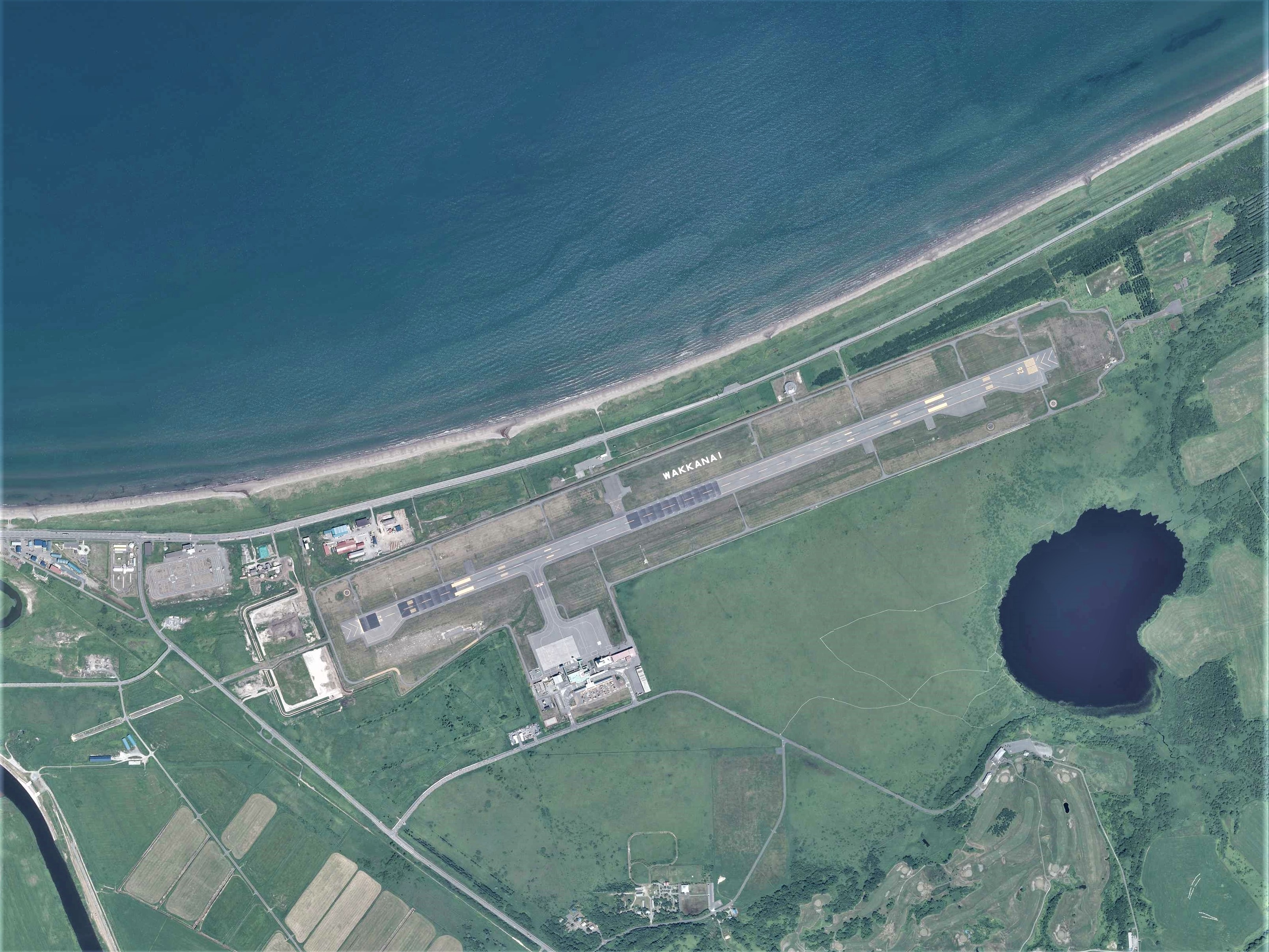
Wakkanai Airport

Wakkanai Airport (稚内空港, Wakkanai Kūkō) (IATA: WKJ, ICAO: RJCW) is an airport located 10 km (6.2 mi) east southeast of Wakkanai, Hokkaido, Japan.

Wakkanai is the northernmost airport in Japan that is capable of handling jet aircraft; due to its small size, it is susceptible to closures during the coldest winter months due to heavy snowfall and winds, in which case incoming aircraft are often diverted to Asahikawa Airport.

== Facilities ==
The airport has one 2,200 meter long runway with no parallel taxiway, and has turning pads on both ends. The landing strip is 45 meters wide and is suitable for instrument landing. The terminal building is located on the south side of the runway. It was completed in 1998 and is equipped with facilities for domestic flights only. It has one jet bridge, one apron gate for mid-sized jet aircraft, and two apron gates for commuter aircraft. The terminal building has three floors, the first two floors being for passengers, and a third floor observation deck that is publicly accessible.

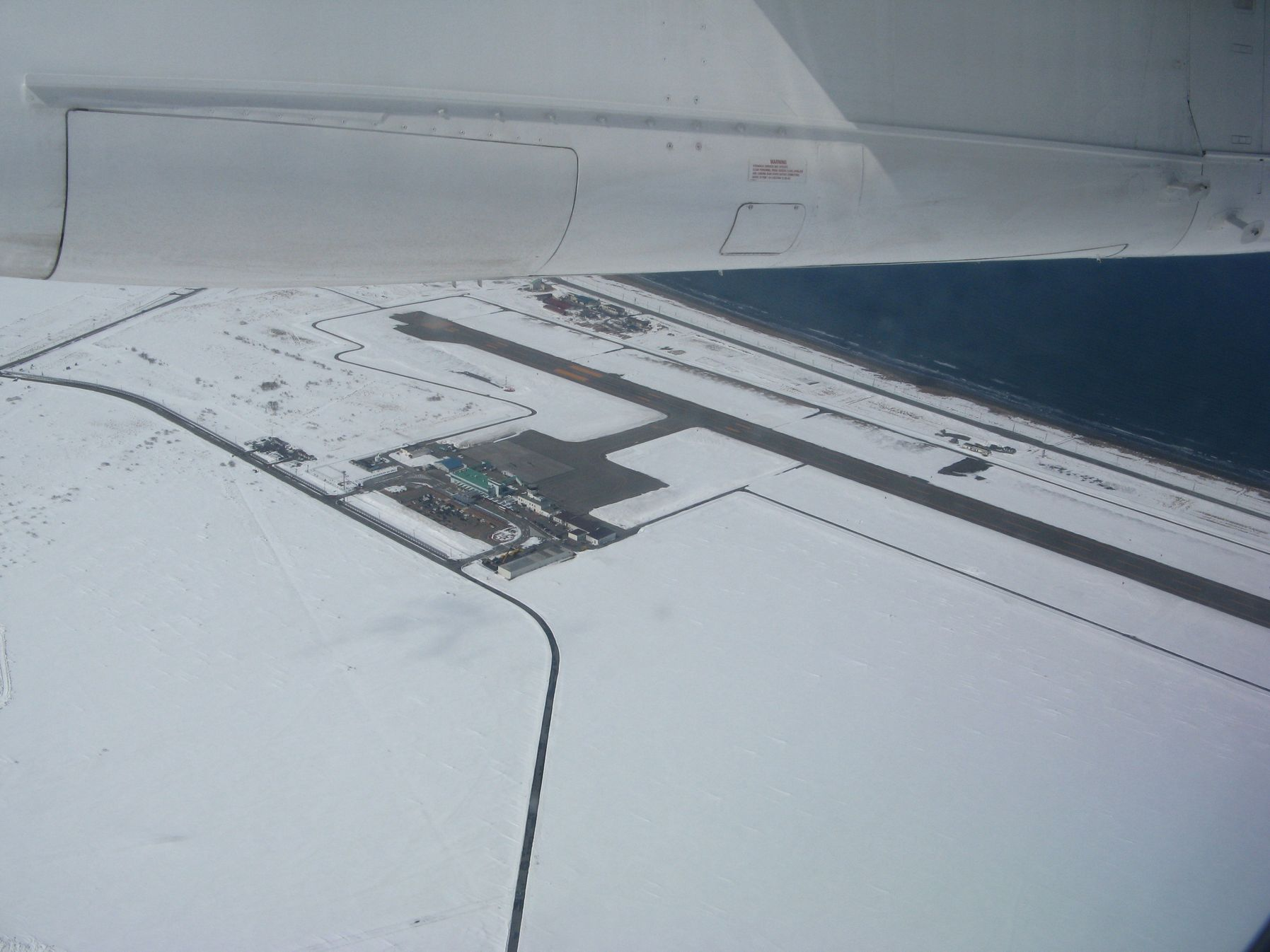
Wakkanai Airport during winter

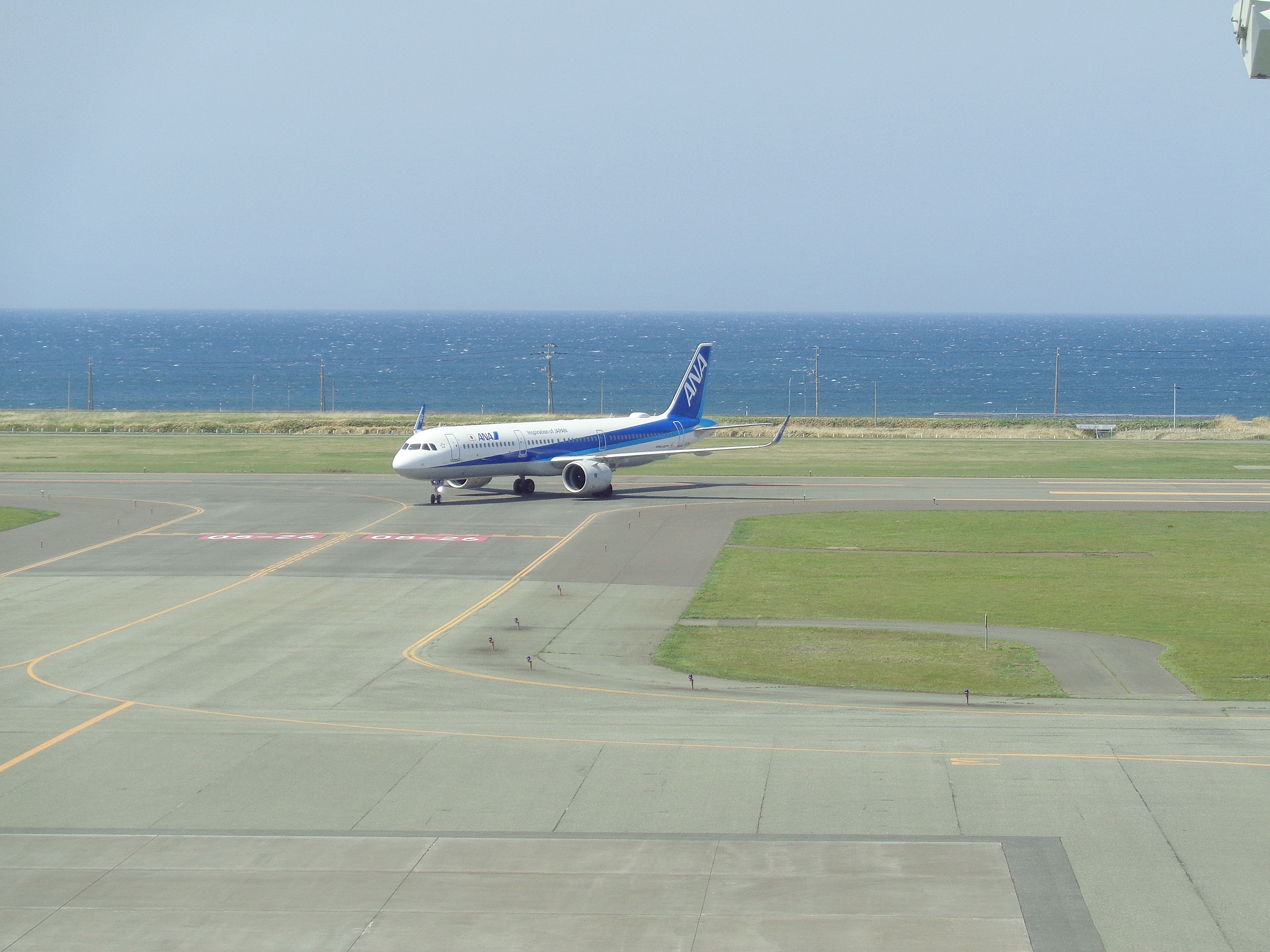
View from passenger lounge of ANA Airbus A320

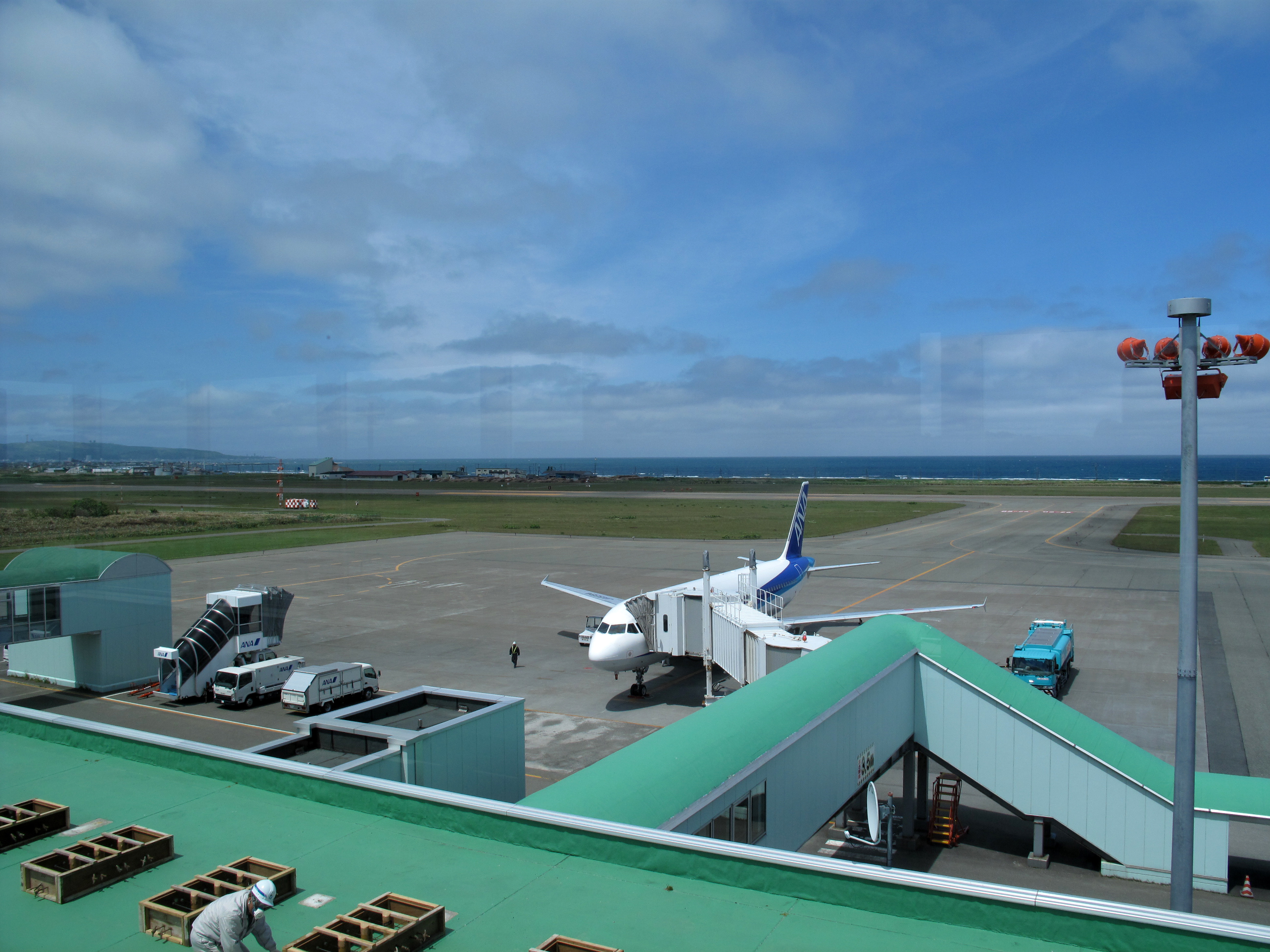
View from Observation Deck

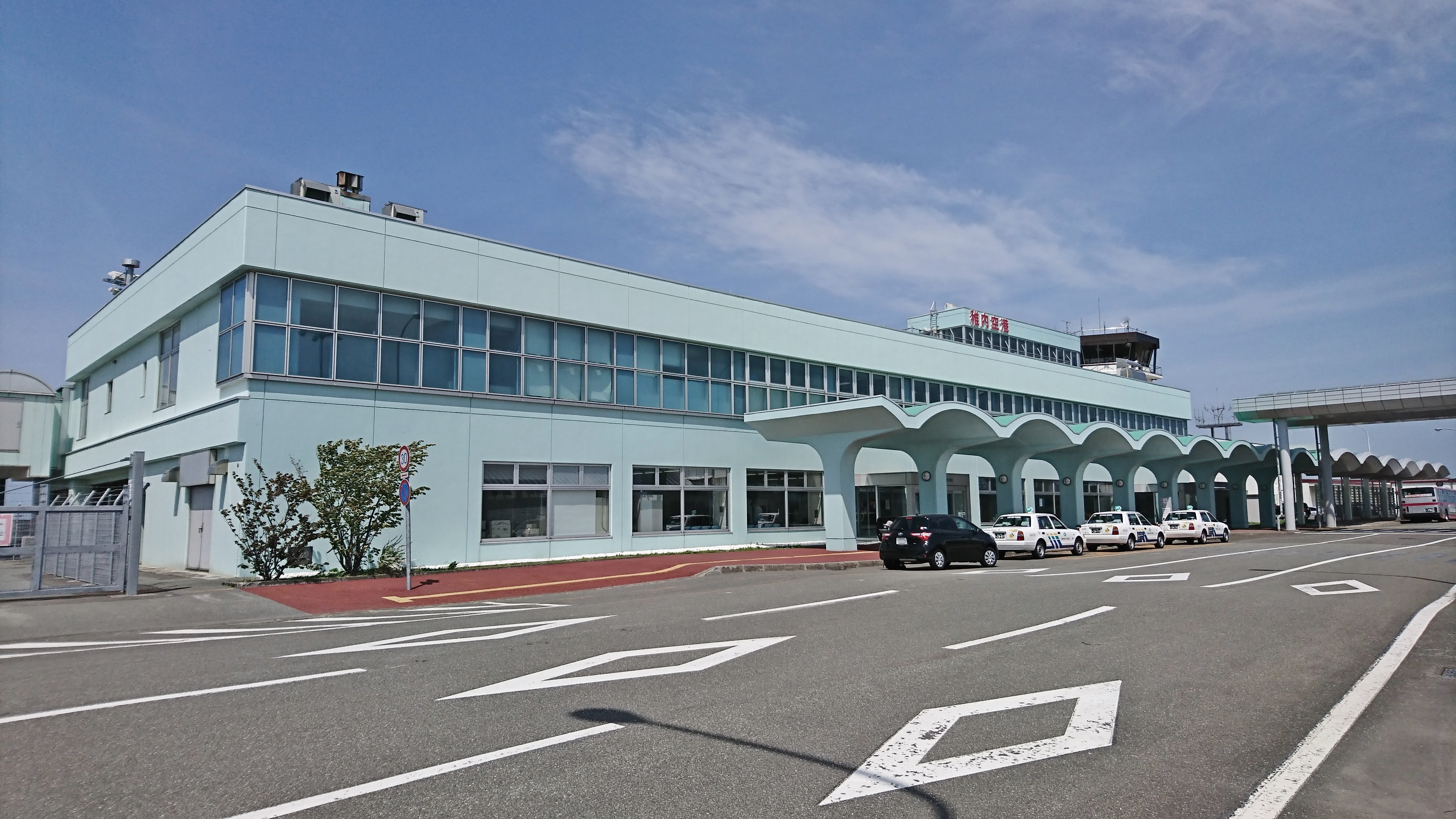
Terminal building

== History ==
Wakkanai Airport opened to passenger traffic in 1960, initially with a 1200-meter runway, and flights by Japan Domestic Airlines to Okadama Airport on an irregular basis. Japan Domestic Airlines was replaced by Yokohama Airlines in 1965. Air Nippon began scheduled service to Okadama Airport and Rishiri Airport in 1974, followed by Rebun Airport in 1978 and New Chitose Airport in 1980. The city of Wakkanai provided subsidies for city residents to use the flight until 2005, when discounted fares became available. In 1987, the runway was lengthened to 1800 meters and a new terminal building was opened on the south side of the runway to handle jet operations. This allowed All Nippon Airways to begin jet service to Tokyo. The flight was initially seasonal and did not become a year-round service until 1997. The runway was extended again, to 2000 meters in 1988 and an instrument landing system (ILS) was installed. The terminal building was expanded in 1998. Air Hokkaido discontinued the short Rebun and Rishiri commuter flights in 2003 due to poor load factors. The runway was further extended to 2200 meters in 2009. In 2016, air traffic control operations were transferred to New Chitose Airport. The airport was privatized in 2021.

As of 2025, ANA has two scheduled daily round trips to Sapporo using Bombardier Q400 turboprops (operated by ANA Wings), and one scheduled daily round trip to Tokyo (two from June to September) using Boeing 737 and Airbus A321 jets.

On 20 August 2025, an ANA Wings Bombardier Q400 arriving from Sapporo-Chitose nearly collided with a runway vehicle while landing on runway 08/26. The Ministry of Transport categorized the event as a "serious incident" and initiated an investigation.

== Airlines and destinations ==
Airlines	Destinations
All Nippon Airways	Tokyo–Haneda
ANA Wings	Sapporo–Chitose

== Ground transportation ==
The airport is 12 kilometers east of central Wakkanai, along the Sōya National Highway ( Japan National Route 238), which runs along the coast of Sōya Bay between Cape Noshappu (Sea of Japan side) and Cape Sōya (Sea of Okhotsk side). The airport is also serviced with a rental car center adjacent to the terminal building.

=== Bus ===
Airport Terminal Bus stop

This bus stop is located near the airport.

No.	Via	Destination	Company	Note
32 (Kuko Sen)	Minami-Wakkanai Station・Wakkanai Station	Wakkanai Ferry Terminal	Soya Bus	Departure times are scheduled to coincide with the ANA flight schedule.
Soya Misaki-Kuko Sen	Soya・Soya Misaki・Soya・Wakkanai Station	Wakkanai Ferry Terminal	Soya Bus	Runs between August and October. Departure times are scheduled to coincide with the ANA flight schedule. Soya bus stop is stopped at twice.

Jidōsha Gakkō-mae Bus stop 自動車学校前

This bus stop is located on Japan National Route 238 in front of the Wakkanai Driving School.

No.	Via	Destination	Company	Note
Tenpoku-Soya Misaki Sen	Minami-Wakkanai Station	Wakkanai Station	Soya Bus	Runs on only one service through Ekimae dōri.
Tenpoku-Soya Misaki Sen	Soya Misaki・Ōmisaki Elementary School・Onishibetsu Station・Sarufutsu Station・Hamatonbetsu Station・Nakatonbetsu Station	Otoineppu Station	Soya Bus	Bus bound for Otoineppu Station runs in only the morning. Most of services run till Nakatonbetsu Station Bus Terminal.

=== Railway ===
Until 1989, the JNR Tempoku Line passed by the airport; however, the airport did not have a station on the line except for one day in June 1987, when a temporary Higashi-Koetoi Station was opened to accommodate visitors to the airport's extended runway.
