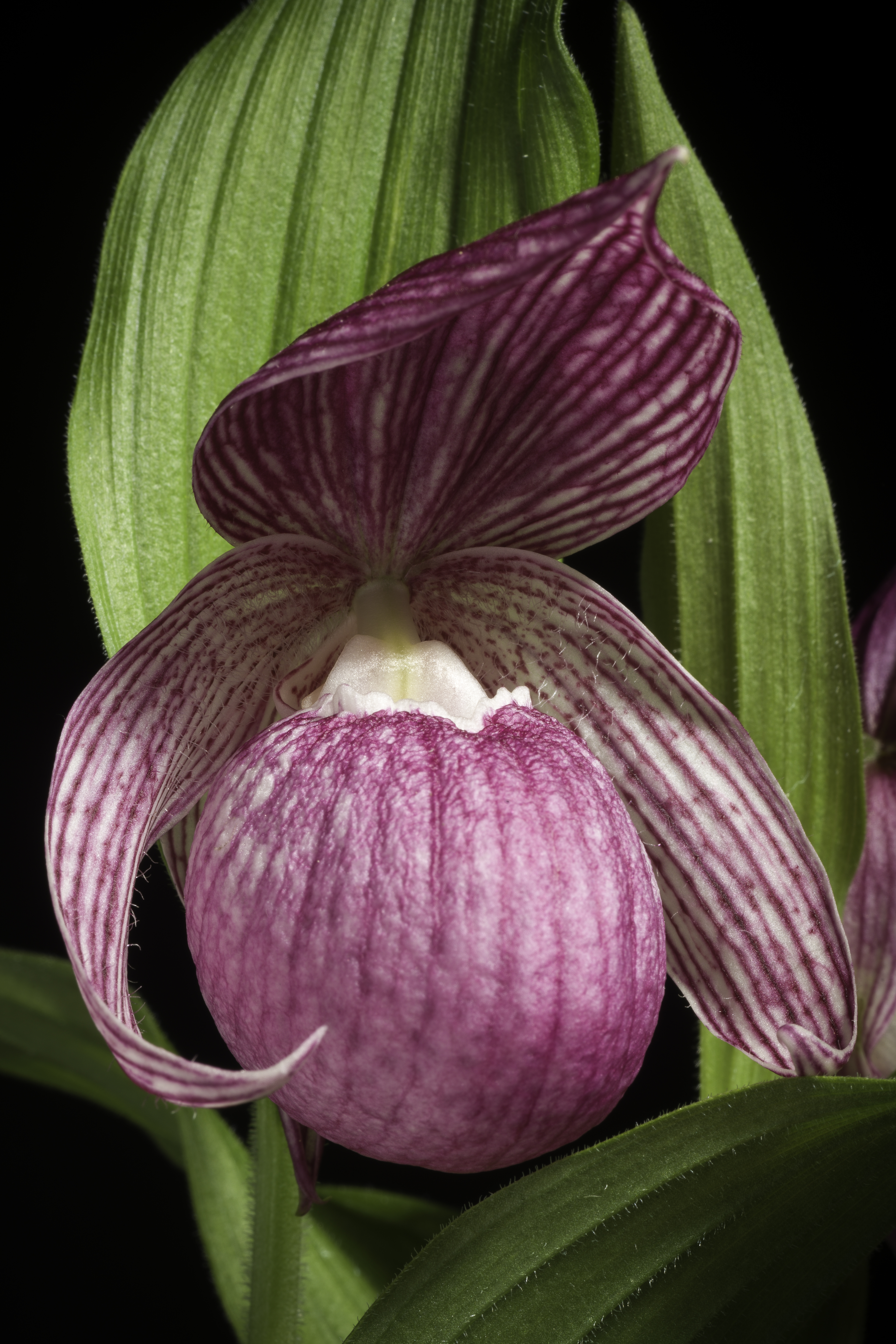

Conservation status
- Least Concern (IUCN 3.1)
- CITES Appendix II

Scientific classification
- Kingdom: Plantae
- Clade: Tracheophytes
- Clade: Angiosperms
- Clade: Monocots
- Order: Asparagales
- Family: Orchidaceae
- Subfamily: Cypripedioideae
- Genus: Cypripedium
- Species: C. macranthos

Binomial name
- Cypripedium macranthos Sw.

Synonyms
- Cypripedium calceolus var. rubrum Georgi; Sacodon macranthos (Sw.) Raf.; Cypripedium thunbergii Blume; Cypripedium macranthos f. vulgare Regel; Cypripedium speciosum Rolfe; Cypripedium macranthos var. flavum Mandl; Cypripedium rebunense Kudô; Cypripedium macranthos var. albiflorum Makino; Cypripedium macranthos var. speciosum (Rolfe) Koidz.; Cypripedium speciosum var. albiflorum Makino; Cypripedium macranthos var. maximum Nakai; Cypripedium macranthos f. rebunense (Kudô) Ohwi; Cypripedium macranthos var. rebunense (Kudô) Miyabe & Kudô; Cypripedium thunbergii f. albiflorum (Makino) Okuyama; Cypripedium macranthos f. albiflorum (Makino) Ohwi; Cypripedium macranthos f. alboroseum Aver.; Cypripedium macranthos f. albostriatum Aver.; Cypripedium macranthos f. flavoroseum Aver.; Cypripedium macranthos var. atropurpureum Aver.; Cypripedium neoparviflorum Y.N.Lee

= Cypripedium macranthos =

Species of orchid

Cypripedium macranthos, commonly known as the large-flowered cypripedium or da hua shao lan (Chinese: 大花杓兰), is a species of orchid native to Russia and East Asia.

== Distribution and habitat ==
Cypripedium macranthos has a widespread distribution across Russia (European Russia and Siberia), Kazakhstan, Mongolia (Huvsgul, Hentii, Mongol Daguur, and Khyangan), Japan, Korea, China (Hebei, Heilongjiang, Jilin, Liaoning, Nei Mongol, and Shandong provinces) and Taiwan. It may also be found in Belarus and Ukraine, but this has not been confirmed. It grows in a variety of habitats from sea level to 2,400 m (7,900 ft) above sea level, including meadows, forests, woodland edges, scrub, riparian areas, and grassy slopes. It prefers well-drained, humus-rich soils but tolerates both acidic and alkaline substrates. Though it prefers slightly shaded areas, it will also grow in more open habitat.

== Description ==
Cypripedium macranthos is a herbaceous plant growing 25–50 cm (9.8–19.7 in) tall. The upright stem arises from a short, thick rhizome with several sheaths near the base. Each plant has three to four elliptic or elliptic-lanceolate leaves, each measuring 10–15 cm (3.9–5.9 in) by 6–8 cm (2.4–3.1 in). The inflorescence typically bears a single red, pink, or purple flower. Rarely, two flowers may be present, or the flower may be white in colour. The dorsal sepal is ovate-elliptic with a pointed tip, measuring 4–5 cm (1.6–2.0 in) by 2.5–3 cm (0.98–1.18 in). The synsepal is ovate with a slightly two-loved tip, measuring 3–4 cm (1.2–1.6 in) 1.5–2 cm (0.59–0.79 in). The petals are lanceolate and each measure 4.5–6 cm (1.8–2.4 in) by 1.5–2.5 cm (0.59–0.98 in). The labellum measures 4.5–5.5 cm (1.8–2.2 in) and is deeply pouched, with a small opening measuring 1.5 cm (0.59 in) across. The fruit is an ellipsoid capsule measuring approximately 4 cm (1.6 in) long.

C. macranthos is similar in appearance to Cypripedium tibeticum, which has slightly larger, darker flowers.

== Ecology ==
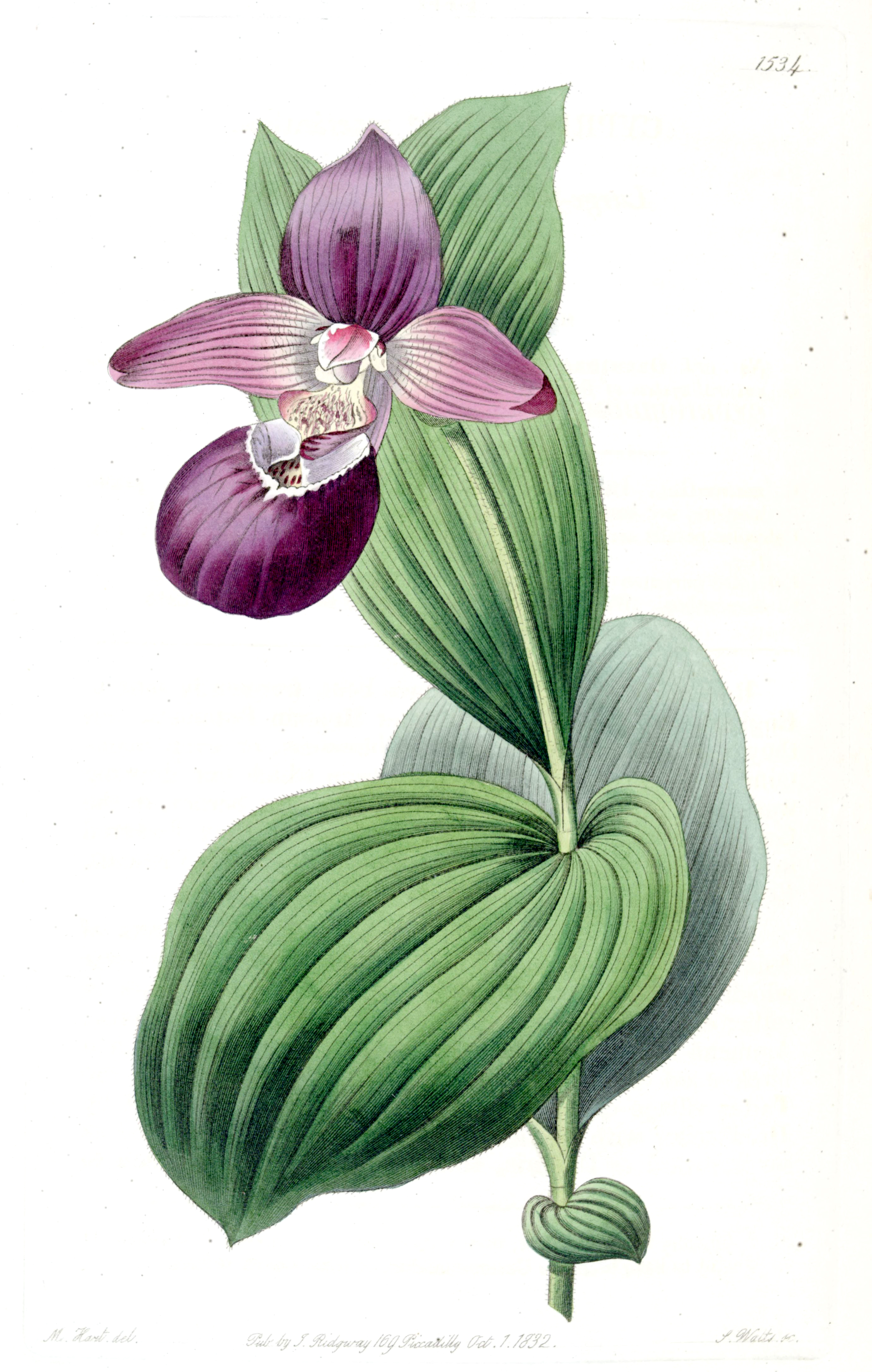
1832 illustration from Edward's Botanical Register

Cypripedium macranthos is capable of reproducing both sexually and vegetatively. Flowering occurs from June to July, with fruits appearing from August to September. Its flowers are self-compatible and primarily pollinated by bumblebee queens.

Cypripedium × ventricosum is a naturally occurring hybrid between C. macranthos and C. calceolus.

== Conservation status ==
Cypripedium macranthos is listed as least concern by the International Union for Conservation of Nature in light of its large distribution and low risk of extinction, however, the population is declining. The abundance of C. macranthos has been significantly reduced in the last few decades due to climate change, deforestation, erosion, overgrazing, poaching, tourism, and urbanization. It is collected for use as an ornamental plant and for use in traditional medicine.

C. macranthos is conserved ex situ in many botanic gardens, and international trade of the species is regulated under Appendix II of the CITES treaty.
