= Mount Rebun =

Mountain in Hokkaido, Japan

- 礼文岳
- Location within Japan

Highest point
- Elevation: 490.0 m (1,607.6 ft)
- Prominence: 490 m (1,610 ft)
- Listing: List of mountains and hills of Japan by height
- Coordinates: 45°22′21″N 141°00′57″E

Geography
- Location: Hokkaidō, Japan
- Parent range: Rebun Island
- Topo map(s): Geographical Survey Institute 25000:1 礼文岳; 50000:1 礼文島北部

Geology
- Rock age: Early Cretaceous
- Mountain type: Sedimentary rock
- Volcanic arc: Sakhalin Island Arc

Climbing
- Easiest route: Hike

Mount Rebun (礼文岳, Rebun-dake) is the highest point on Rebun Island in Rebun, Hokkaidō, Japan. The mountain consists of marine sedimentary rocks from the Early Cretaceous period, 149–97 million years ago.

== Climbing route ==
The trailhead for the Mount Rebun hike is in Nairo. It is a 3-hour hike with no water available. The trail first passes through fields of sasa-no-ha before entering a forest of pine and birch. The peak rises above the forest to grant an unobstructed view of the entire island.
