= Rebun, Hokkaido =

Rebun 礼文町
- Town
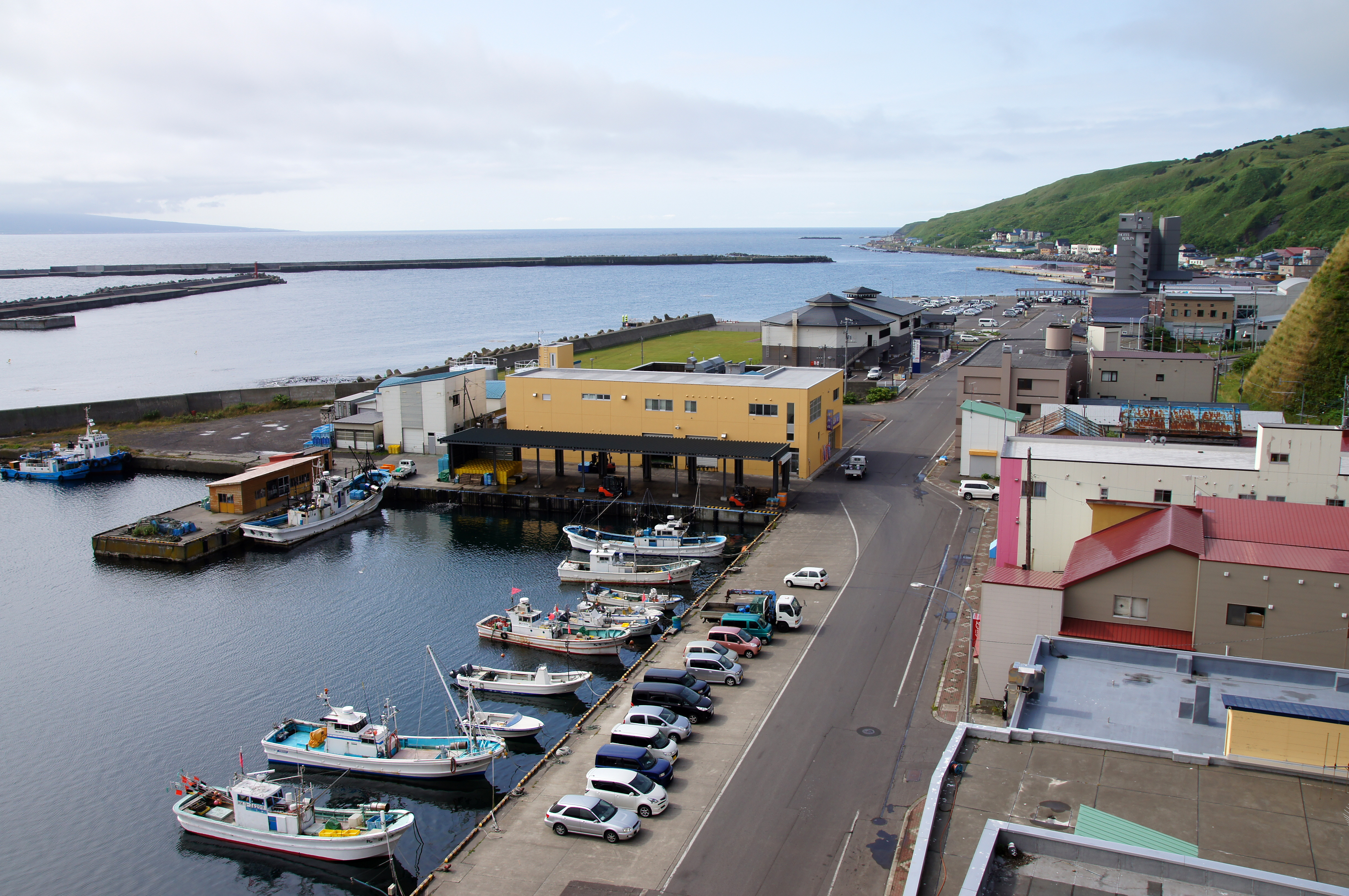
- Kafuka Port in Rebun

- Flag Seal

- Location of Rebun in Hokkaido

- Location in Japan
- Coordinates: 45°18′N 141°3′E
- Country: Japan
- Region: Hokkaido
- Prefecture: Hokkaido
- District: Rebun District

Area
  - Total: 81.33 km^{2} (31.40 sq mi)

Population (September 30, 2016)
  - Total: 2,651
  - Density: 32.60/km^{2} (84.42/sq mi)
- Time zone: UTC+09:00 (JST)
- City hall address: 558-5 Aza Tonnai, Ōaza Kafuka-mura, Hokkaidō; 097-1201
- Climate: Dfb
- Website: www.town.rebun.hokkaido.jp
- Symbols
- Bird: Japanese robin
- Flower: Leontopodium discolor (ezo-usuyuki-sō)
- Tree: Juniperus chinensis

Rebun (礼文町, Rebun-chō) is a town located in Sōya Subprefecture, Hokkaido, Japan. The district and town both cover the island of the same name: Rebun Island. Rebun Island is famous for its alpine flowers.

== History ==
=== Pre-Dynastical and Prehistorical Period ===
Various prehistoric ruins from the Okhotsk culture have been discovered in the areas of Kafukai and Funadomari. Later down the line it seems that there was also the presence of various Ainu, leading to the various remains of castles from the Ainu period, scattered across the area.

=== Kosho Period ===
In 1456 (Kōshō 2): A battle between the Kafukai Ainu and the Isogai Ainu took place near present-day Momoiwa, right next to today's town.

=== Jokyo Period ===
In 1685 (Jokyo 2): The area became a soya place directly controlled by the Matsumae Domain, and both the settlements in Rishiri and Rebun became their subsidiary places.

=== Meiwa Period ===
In 1765 (Meiwa 2), Rebun, Rishiri, and Soya were declared independent provinces.

=== Bunsei Period ===
In the later part of the Edo Period, in 1819 (Bunsei 2), Ihei Fujino becomes the contractor for the Soya place of the Matsumae domain, developing it.

=== Koka Period ===
1846 (Koka 3): Mannosuke Yanagida, who moved from the Aomori Prefecture, becomes the first immigrant to Shakunin and begins developing fishing grounds, opening the Oshima fishing grounds in Shakunin (Kafuku/Rebun). Up until now the population was mostly Ainu.

=== Meiji Period ===
During the Meiji era, the city strengthened its administrative core, as in 1878 ( Meiji 11) The village head offices of Rebun County were established in Kafuka. However, in 1892 (Meiji 25), the village of Funadomari was separated, shrinking its size.

This was part of a larger campaign in the Meiji Era to modernize local administrations, thus part of the famous Meiji Restoration.

=== Showa Period ===
Whilst politically, through the establishment of a modern local administration in the area, the Meiji restoration had already reached the town, only by the Showa Period would the construction of a power distribution line be completed in Uchiji village, and only then would the electricity is now distributed to all villages in the Kafuka district, including Rebun.

On September 20, 1956 ( Showa 31), due to the deterioration of the financial situation of Kafuka Village, the villages of Funadomari and Kafuka merged (to form a new village) known as Rebun Village, once again enlarging Rebun's administrative area. This was officialized in 1959 (Showa 34), as the town was incorporated as Rebun Town.

== Geography ==
The town covers the entire area of Rebun Island in the Sea of Japan. Rebun is located approximately 50 kilometres (31 mi) from Wakkanai on mainland Hokkaido and 10 kilometres (6.2 mi) northwest of Rishiri Island. The entire island is part of the Rishiri-Rebun-Sarobetsu National Park. Lake Kushu and Mount Rebun (Rebun's highest point) are located in the town.

Rebun is well known for its 300 species of alpine flowers, some of which are endemic to the island. For this it has earned the moniker the island of flowers. Such flowers include: Cypripedium macranthum Sw. var. rebunense (Kudo) Miyabe et Kudo (Rebun atsumori-sō).

=== Climate ===
Climate data for Rebun, elevation 65 m (213 ft), (2003–2020 normals, extremes 2004–present)
Month	Jan	Feb	Mar	Apr	May	Jun	Jul	Aug	Sep	Oct	Nov	Dec	Year
Record high °C (°F)	6.9 (44.4)	6.7 (44.1)	11.0 (51.8)	17.4 (63.3)	20.8 (69.4)	24.6 (76.3)	29.9 (85.8)	30.5 (86.9)	29.0 (84.2)	22.9 (73.2)	15.5 (59.9)	10.9 (51.6)	30.5 (86.9)
Mean daily maximum °C (°F)	−2.7 (27.1)	−2.1 (28.2)	1.7 (35.1)	6.6 (43.9)	11.6 (52.9)	15.9 (60.6)	20.4 (68.7)	22.6 (72.7)	20.5 (68.9)	13.9 (57.0)	6.1 (43.0)	−0.3 (31.5)	9.5 (49.1)
Daily mean °C (°F)	−4.6 (23.7)	−4.3 (24.3)	−0.4 (31.3)	4.1 (39.4)	8.5 (47.3)	12.8 (55.0)	17.3 (63.1)	19.7 (67.5)	17.4 (63.3)	11.2 (52.2)	3.6 (38.5)	−2.4 (27.7)	6.9 (44.4)
Mean daily minimum °C (°F)	−6.5 (20.3)	−6.4 (20.5)	−2.4 (27.7)	1.8 (35.2)	6.0 (42.8)	10.3 (50.5)	14.9 (58.8)	17.3 (63.1)	14.5 (58.1)	8.4 (47.1)	1.2 (34.2)	−4.5 (23.9)	4.6 (40.2)
Record low °C (°F)	−15.8 (3.6)	−17.1 (1.2)	−9.6 (14.7)	−5.7 (21.7)	0.2 (32.4)	4.0 (39.2)	8.1 (46.6)	10.9 (51.6)	5.8 (42.4)	−1.1 (30.0)	−11.4 (11.5)	−13.4 (7.9)	−17.1 (1.2)
Average precipitation mm (inches)	73.4 (2.89)	51.6 (2.03)	44.1 (1.74)	49.2 (1.94)	79.7 (3.14)	84.6 (3.33)	101.0 (3.98)	138.6 (5.46)	131.1 (5.16)	100.4 (3.95)	98.4 (3.87)	91.5 (3.60)	1,043.6 (41.09)
Average precipitation days (≥ 1.0 mm)	17.9	14.4	10.9	8.7	9.7	9.6	7.5	8.9	10.5	11.6	12.9	16.2	138.8
Mean monthly sunshine hours	47.5	72.2	153.8	192.7	170.4	125.9	126.5	154.2	186.7	159.6	82.0	42.5	1,514.3
Source 1: JMA
Source 2: JMA

== Demographics ==
Per Japanese census data, the population of Rebun has declined in recent decades.

Historical population
Year	Pop.	±%
2000	3,856	—
2010	3,078	−20.2%
2020	2,509	−18.5%

== Arts and culture ==
Rebun hosts a flower festival every year.

=== Mascot ===
Atsumon, the town's mascot

Rebun's mascot is Atsumon (あつもん), who is a Rebun lady's slipper orchid (a type of the large-flowered cypripedium orchid species). As a flower, its gender is unknown, but its feelings are gentle and calm. It is known to like nature. Its heart (its charm point) is actually the seed of happiness from fourteen different native flowers. However, it will not tolerate anyone harming nature (especially seedlings). If damage is done to nature, its heart will stop beating. It was unveiled in September 2012.

== Airspace violations ==
With its location in the far north of Japan, Rebun has been the site of the most violations of Japanese airspace. From 1967 to 2017 14 of the 39 violations of Japanese airspace have been near Rebun. This is the most of any location in Japan. They were all by either Soviet aircraft during the Cold War or by Russian aircraft after 1991.

== Sister cities ==
- Ohasama, Iwate (Currently Hanamaki)
- Yutaka, Hiroshima (Currently Kure)

== Gallery ==
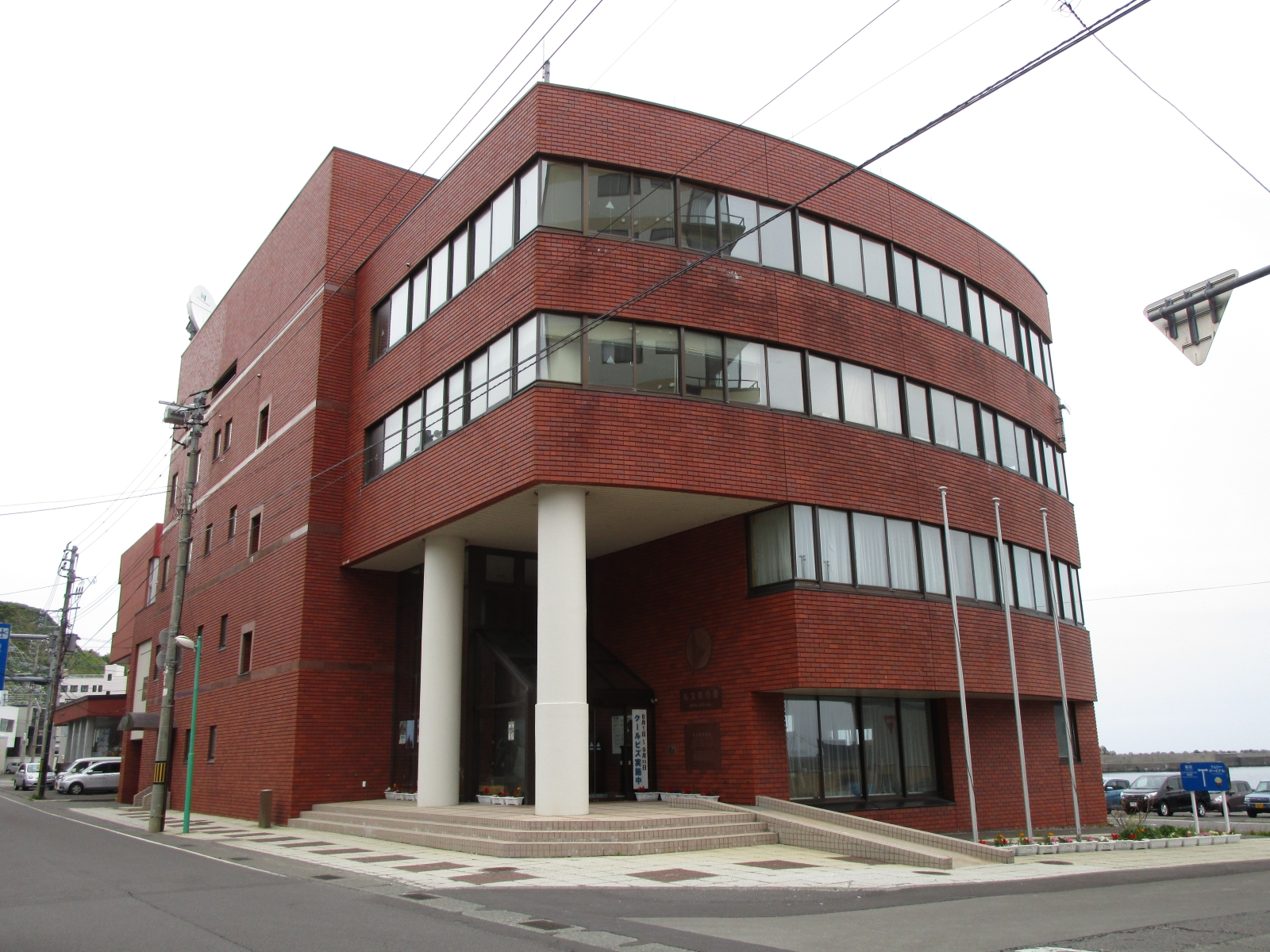
Rebun town hall

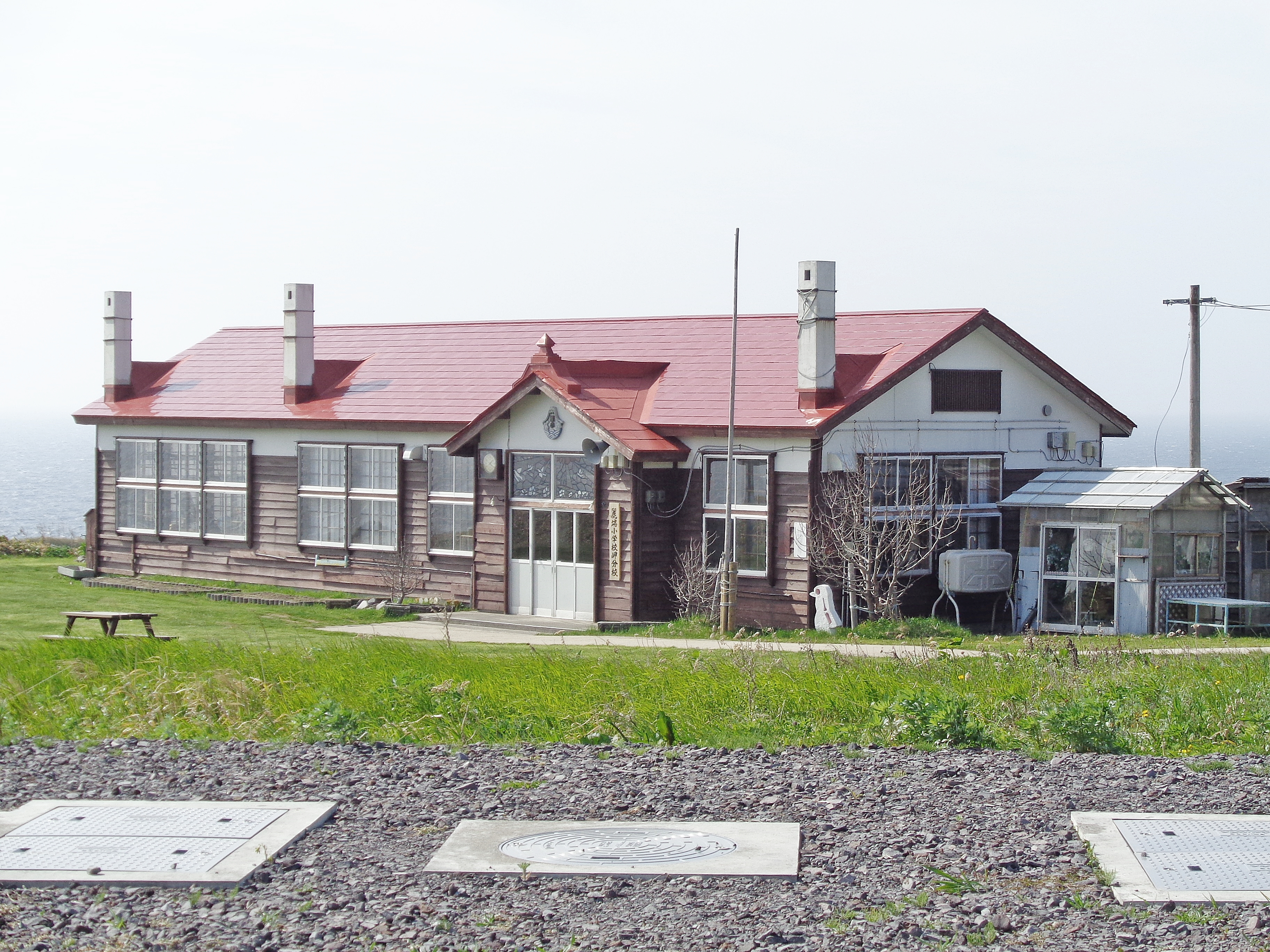
Elementary school in Rebun

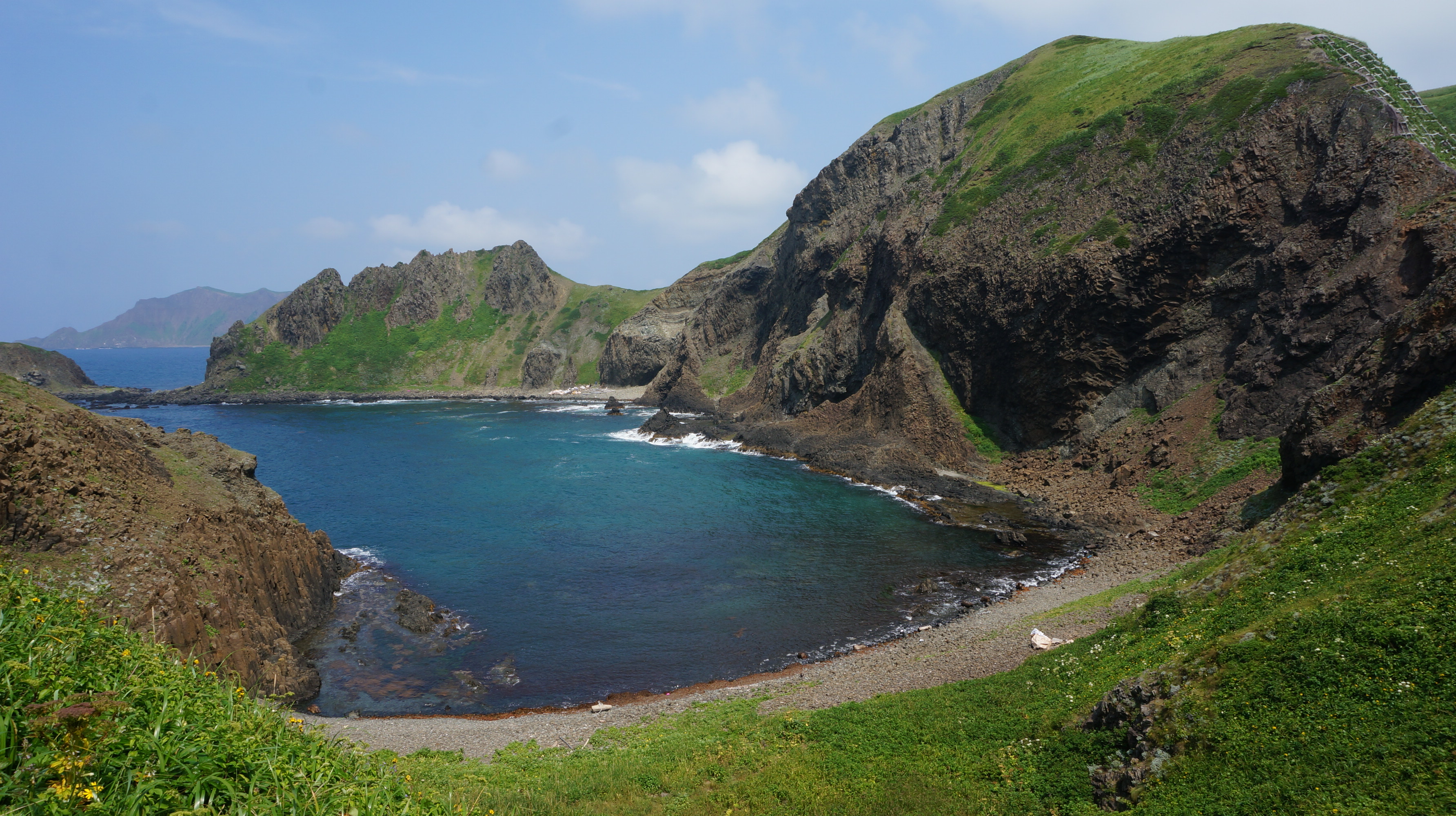
Cape Sukai

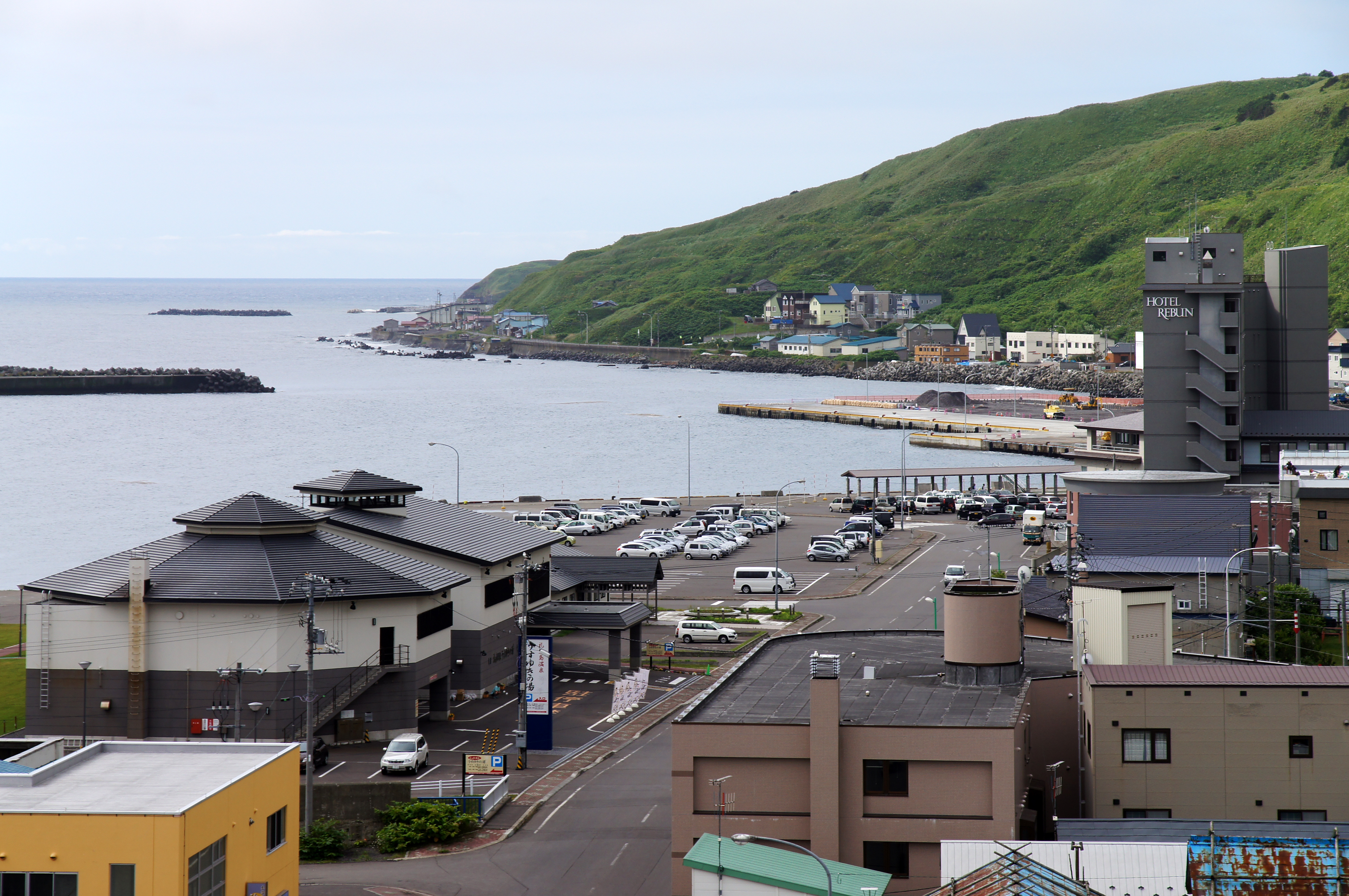
Kafuka Port
