= Rebun Island =

Island in the Sea of Japan

Rebun
Native name: 礼文島, Rebun-tō
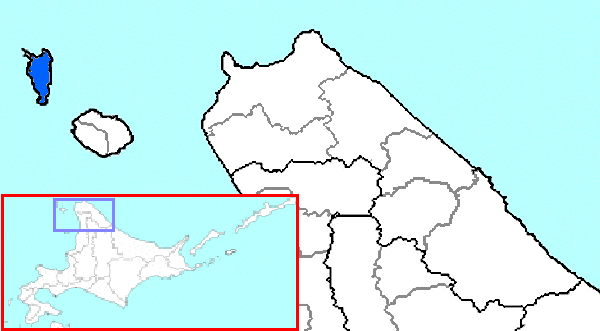

- Location within Japan

Geography
- Location: East Asia
- Coordinates: 45°22′07″N 141°00′55″E
- Archipelago: Japanese archipelago
- Area: 80 km^{2} (31 sq mi)
- Length: 29 km (18 mi)
- Width: 8 km (5 mi)
- Coastline: 72 km (44.7 mi)
- Highest elevation: 490.0 m (1607.6 ft)
- Highest point: Mount Rebun

Administration
- Japan
- Prefecture: Hokkaido
- Subprefecture: Sōya Subprefecture
- District: Rebun District
- Town: Rebun

Demographics
- Population: 3,194 (2007-12-31)
- Pop. density: 39.3/km^{2} (101.8/sq mi)
- Ethnic groups: Ainu, Japanese

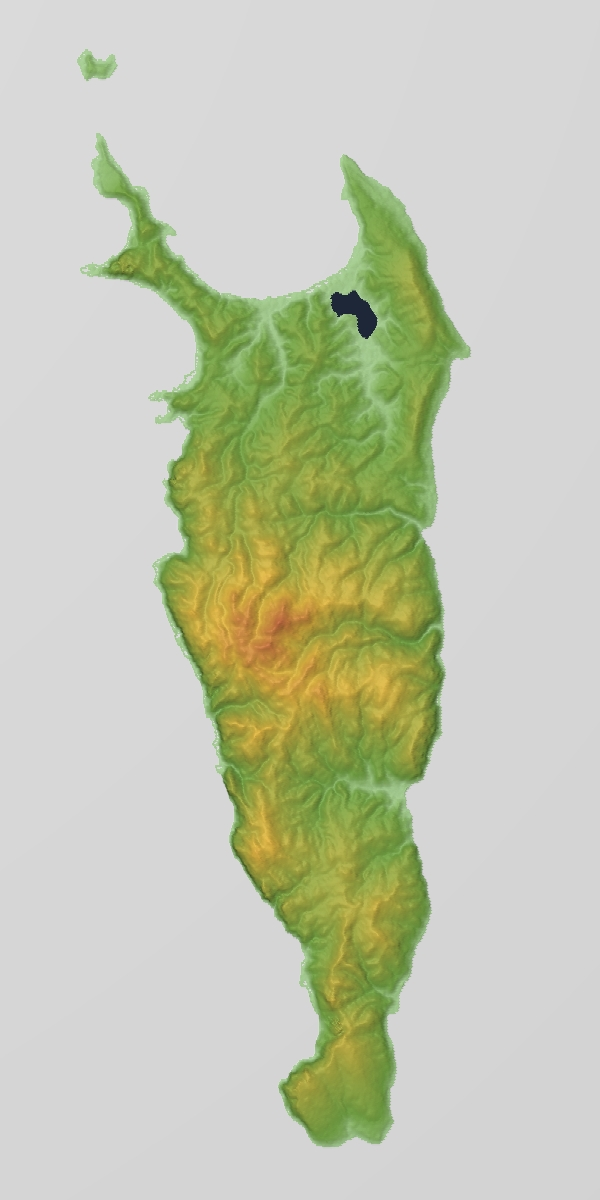
Relief Map

Rebun Island (礼文島, Rebun-tō; Ainu: Repun) is an island in the Sea of Japan off the northwestern tip of Hokkaidō, Japan. The island sits 50 kilometres (31 mi) off the coast of Hokkaidō. Rebun stretches 29 kilometres (18 mi) from north to south and 8 kilometres (5.0 mi) from east to west. The island covers approximately 80 square kilometres (31 mi^{2}). Rebun Island is located 10 kilometres (6.2 mi) northwest of Rishiri Island, and the two islands are separated by the Rebun Channel.

Rebun Island is known for its alpine flowers and the 8-Hour Hiking Course which runs from one end of the island to the other, north to south. The hiking course can be broken into two sections, known as the 4-Hour Hiking Courses. Rebun Island is home to a chashi, or hilltop fortification of the Ainu people. The highest point on the island is Mount Rebun (490 metres (1,610 ft)). The island is part of the Rishiri-Rebun-Sarobetsu National Park.

Fossilized remains of long-finned pilot whales that are now extinct in the North Pacific have been excavated on Rebun Island, and remains of funerals for orcas, possibly referring them as Repun Kamuy (God of Sea/Offshore) have been found as well. Rebun Island is also the site where the last reliable record of the extinct Japanese sea lion came from in 1974.

== Etymology ==
The name of the island comes from the Ainu language, in which "Repun" means "(island) in the open sea" (from rep "the offing, open sea" + -un "to be in ~").

== Climate ==
Climate data for Rebun, elevation 65 m (213 ft), (2003–2020 normals, extremes 2004–present)
Month	Jan	Feb	Mar	Apr	May	Jun	Jul	Aug	Sep	Oct	Nov	Dec	Year
Record high °C (°F)	6.9 (44.4)	6.7 (44.1)	11.0 (51.8)	17.4 (63.3)	20.8 (69.4)	24.6 (76.3)	29.9 (85.8)	30.5 (86.9)	29.0 (84.2)	22.9 (73.2)	15.5 (59.9)	10.9 (51.6)	30.5 (86.9)
Mean daily maximum °C (°F)	−2.7 (27.1)	−2.1 (28.2)	1.7 (35.1)	6.6 (43.9)	11.6 (52.9)	15.9 (60.6)	20.4 (68.7)	22.6 (72.7)	20.5 (68.9)	13.9 (57.0)	6.1 (43.0)	−0.3 (31.5)	9.5 (49.1)
Daily mean °C (°F)	−4.6 (23.7)	−4.3 (24.3)	−0.4 (31.3)	4.1 (39.4)	8.5 (47.3)	12.8 (55.0)	17.3 (63.1)	19.7 (67.5)	17.4 (63.3)	11.2 (52.2)	3.6 (38.5)	−2.4 (27.7)	6.9 (44.4)
Mean daily minimum °C (°F)	−6.5 (20.3)	−6.4 (20.5)	−2.4 (27.7)	1.8 (35.2)	6.0 (42.8)	10.3 (50.5)	14.9 (58.8)	17.3 (63.1)	14.5 (58.1)	8.4 (47.1)	1.2 (34.2)	−4.5 (23.9)	4.6 (40.2)
Record low °C (°F)	−15.8 (3.6)	−17.1 (1.2)	−9.6 (14.7)	−5.7 (21.7)	0.2 (32.4)	4.0 (39.2)	8.1 (46.6)	10.9 (51.6)	5.8 (42.4)	−1.1 (30.0)	−11.4 (11.5)	−13.4 (7.9)	−17.1 (1.2)
Average precipitation mm (inches)	73.4 (2.89)	51.6 (2.03)	44.1 (1.74)	49.2 (1.94)	79.7 (3.14)	84.6 (3.33)	101.0 (3.98)	138.6 (5.46)	131.1 (5.16)	100.4 (3.95)	98.4 (3.87)	91.5 (3.60)	1,043.6 (41.09)
Average precipitation days (≥ 1.0 mm)	17.9	14.4	10.9	8.7	9.7	9.6	7.5	8.9	10.5	11.6	12.9	16.2	138.8
Mean monthly sunshine hours	47.5	72.2	153.8	192.7	170.4	125.9	126.5	154.2	186.7	159.6	82.0	42.5	1,514.3
Source 1: JMA
Source 2: JMA

== Areas of interest ==
- Mount Rebun
- Peach Rock, or Momoiwa
- Jizo Rock
- Cat Rock, or Nekoiwa
- Cape Sukoton
- Cape Kaneda
- Cape Gorota
- Cape Sukai
- Todo Island
- Lake Kushu
- Yamunai Valley
- Rebun Forest Road
- Rebun Falls

== Communities ==
All communities on Rebun Island are part of the town of Rebun in Rebun District. From roughly from north to south, they are:

- Sukoton
- Awabikoton
- Hamanaka
- Funadomari
- Horodomari
- Uedomari
- Nairo
- Kitousu
- Kafukai
- Kafuka
- Shiretoko

== Transportation ==
- Ferry link to Rishiri Island and Wakkanai
- Air link to Wakkanai Airport

== Ancient people ==
A Jōmon man (numbered 5) excavated from Funadomari remains (about 3,800 – 3,500 YBP) on the Rebun Island in Hokkaido belongs to Y-DNA Haplogroup D1b2a(D-CTS220). This discovery proved the hypothesis that Haplogroup D1b is one of the Jomon lineages.

== In popular culture ==
In the manga and anime series Food Wars!: Shokugeki no Soma, the island is the last step in the Promotion test which takes place across Hokkaido Island.

== Gallery ==
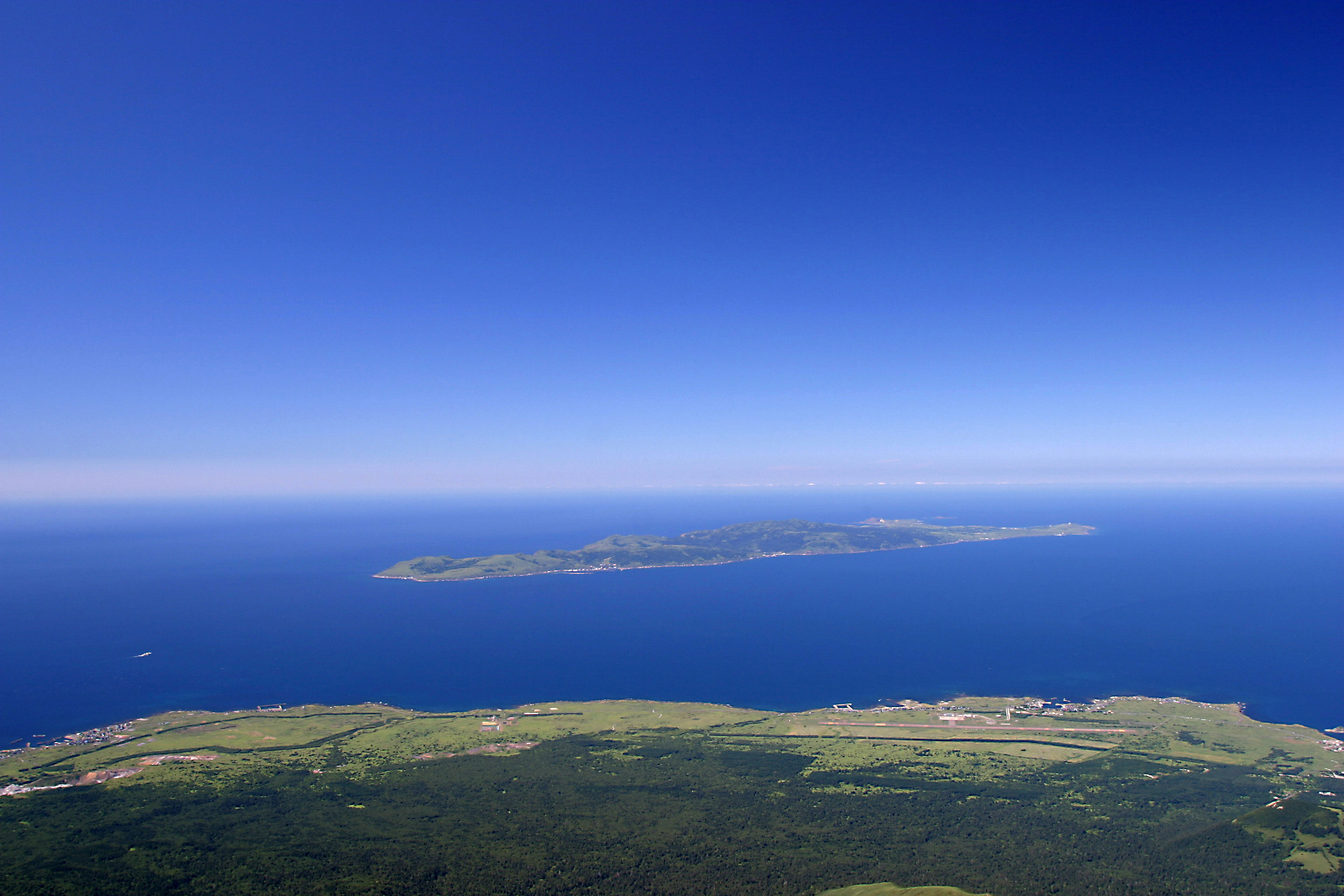
Rebun island (background) seen from Mount Rishiri

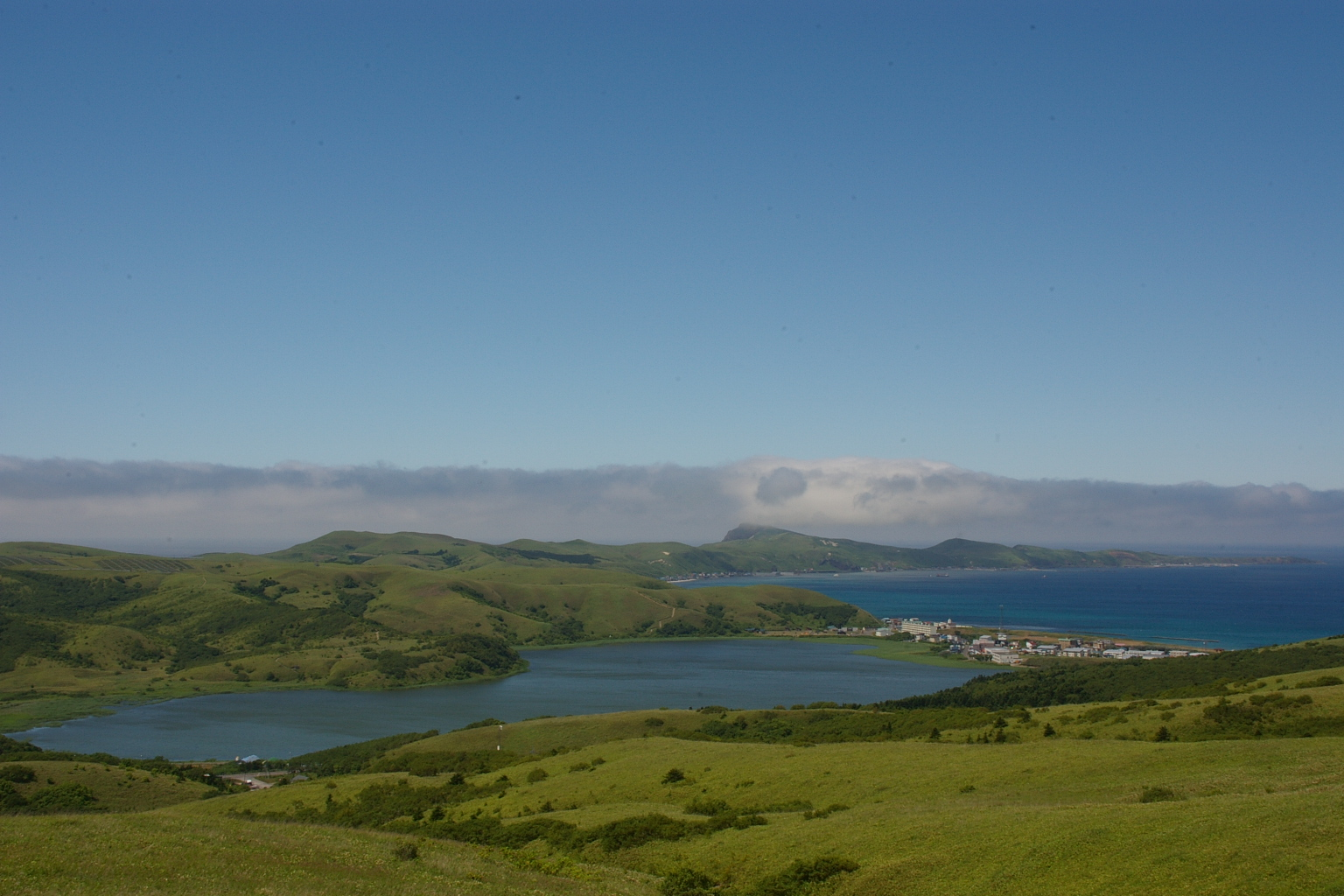
Lake Kusyu on Rebun island

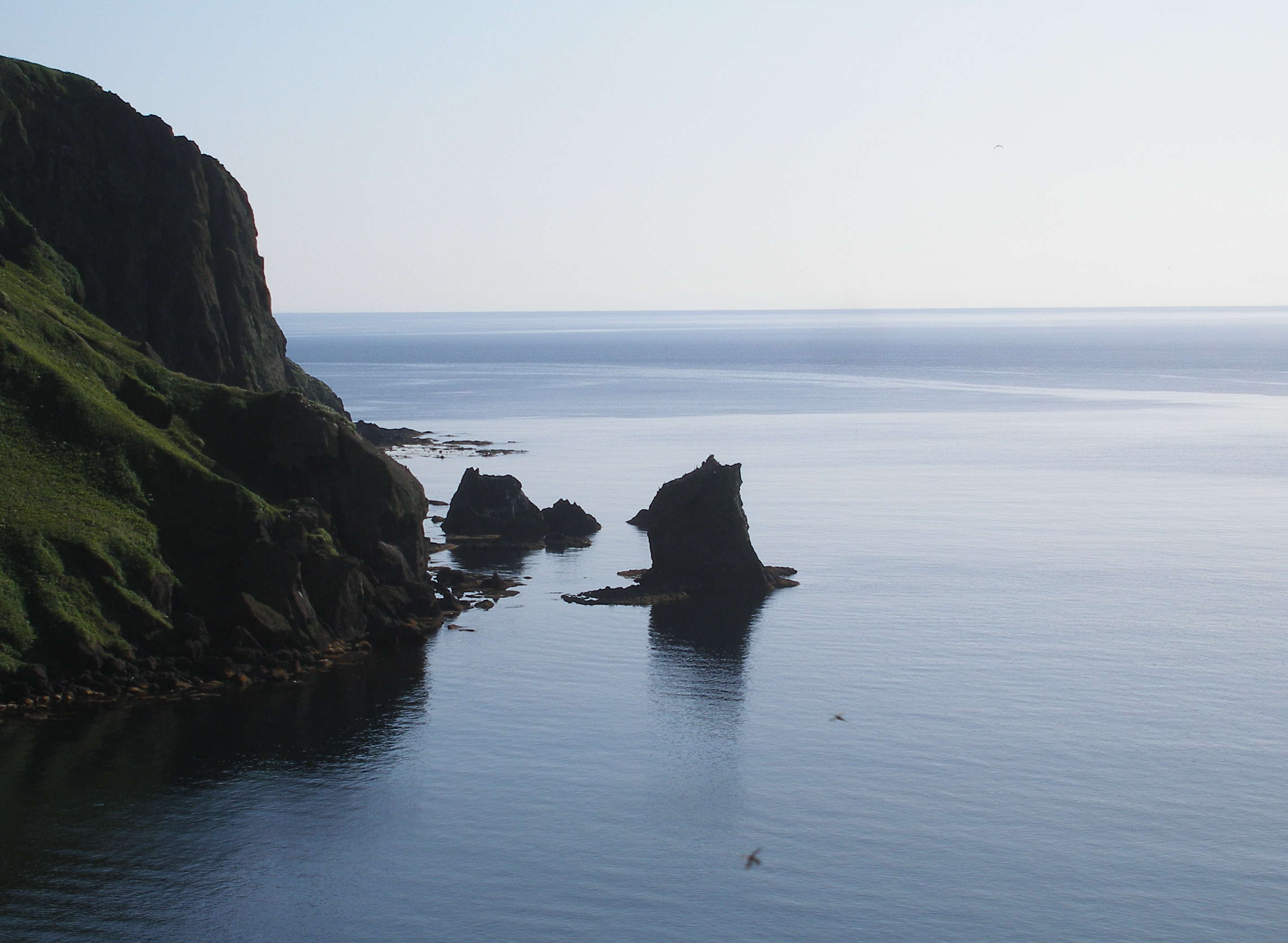
Neko-iwa, 'cat rock'

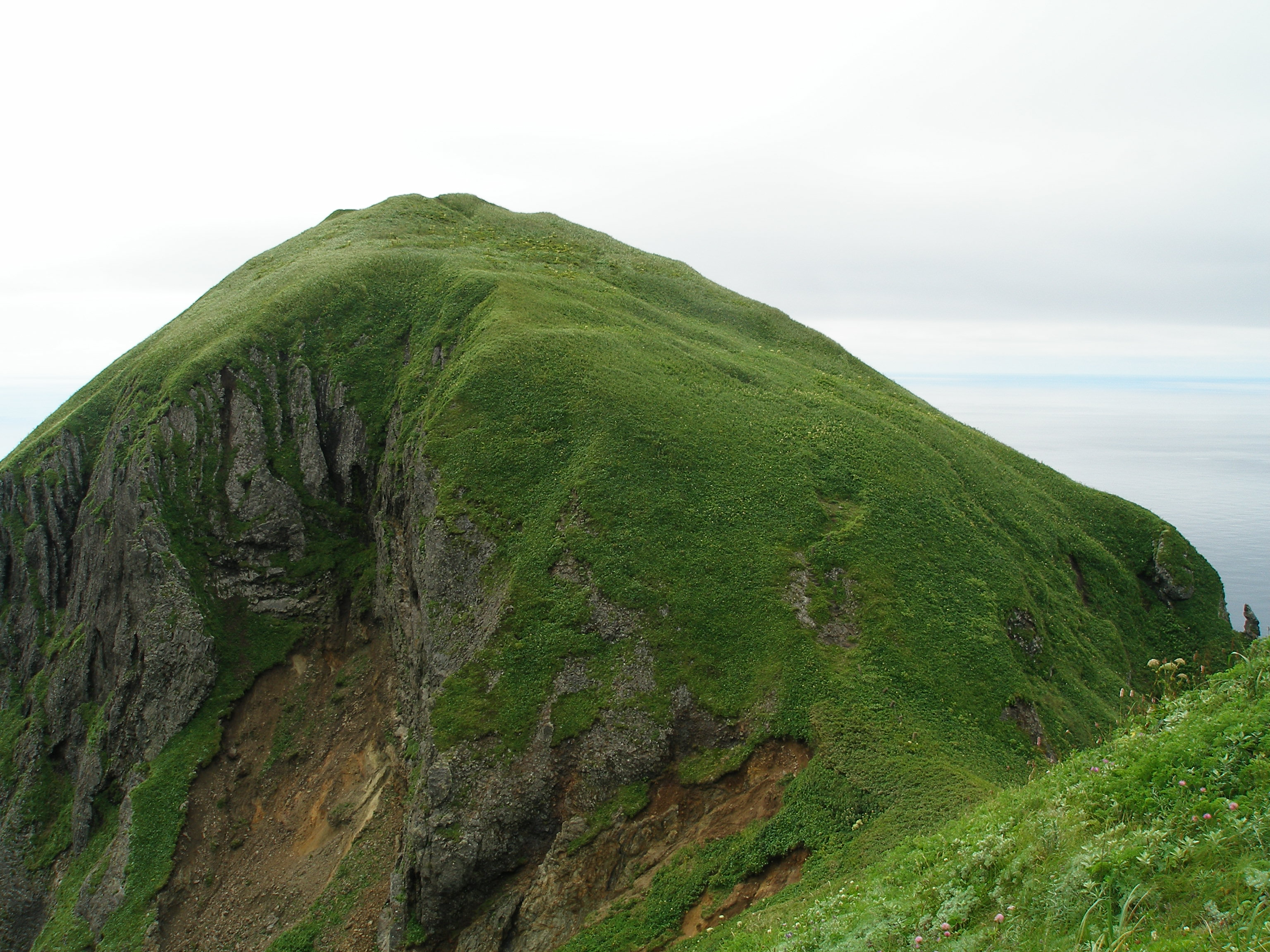
Momo-iwa, 'peach rock'

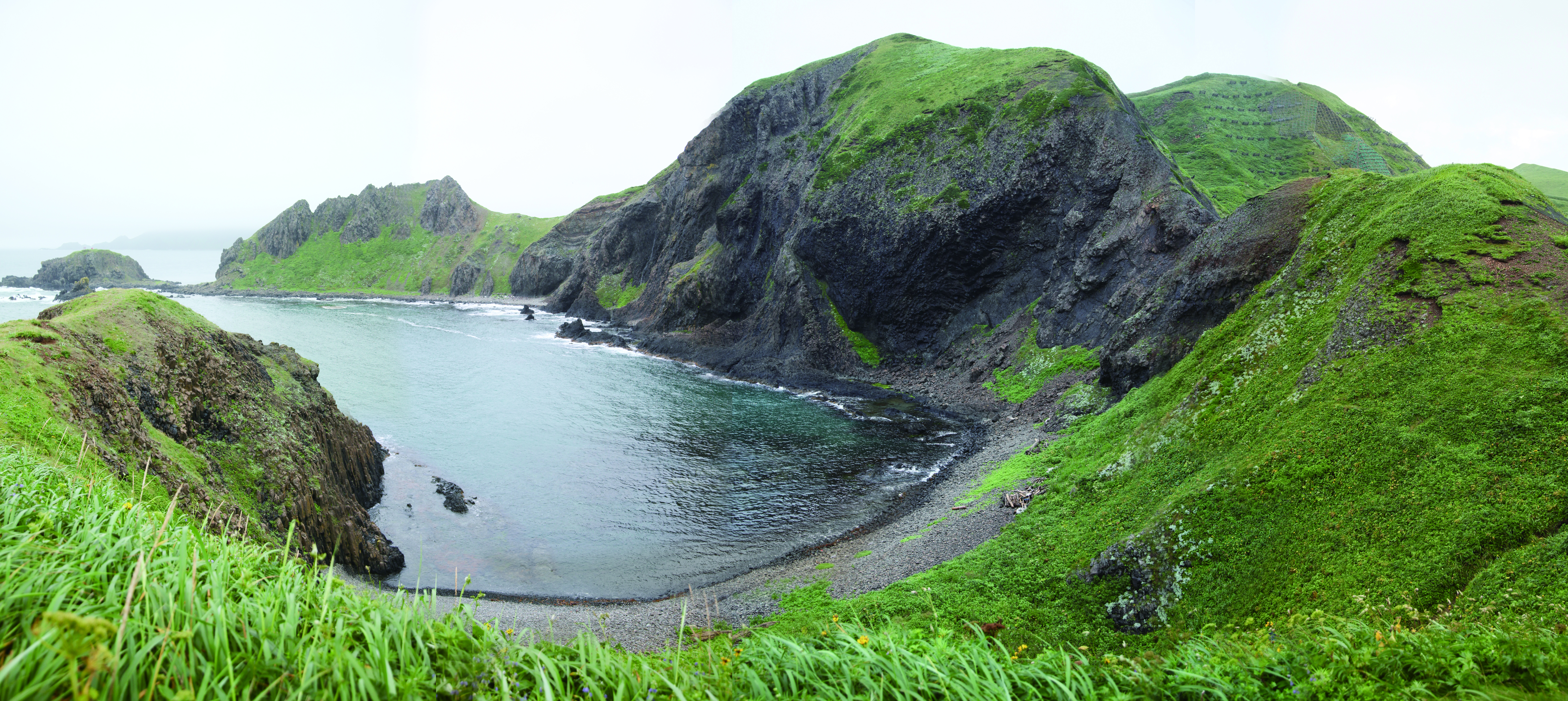
Sukai Cape

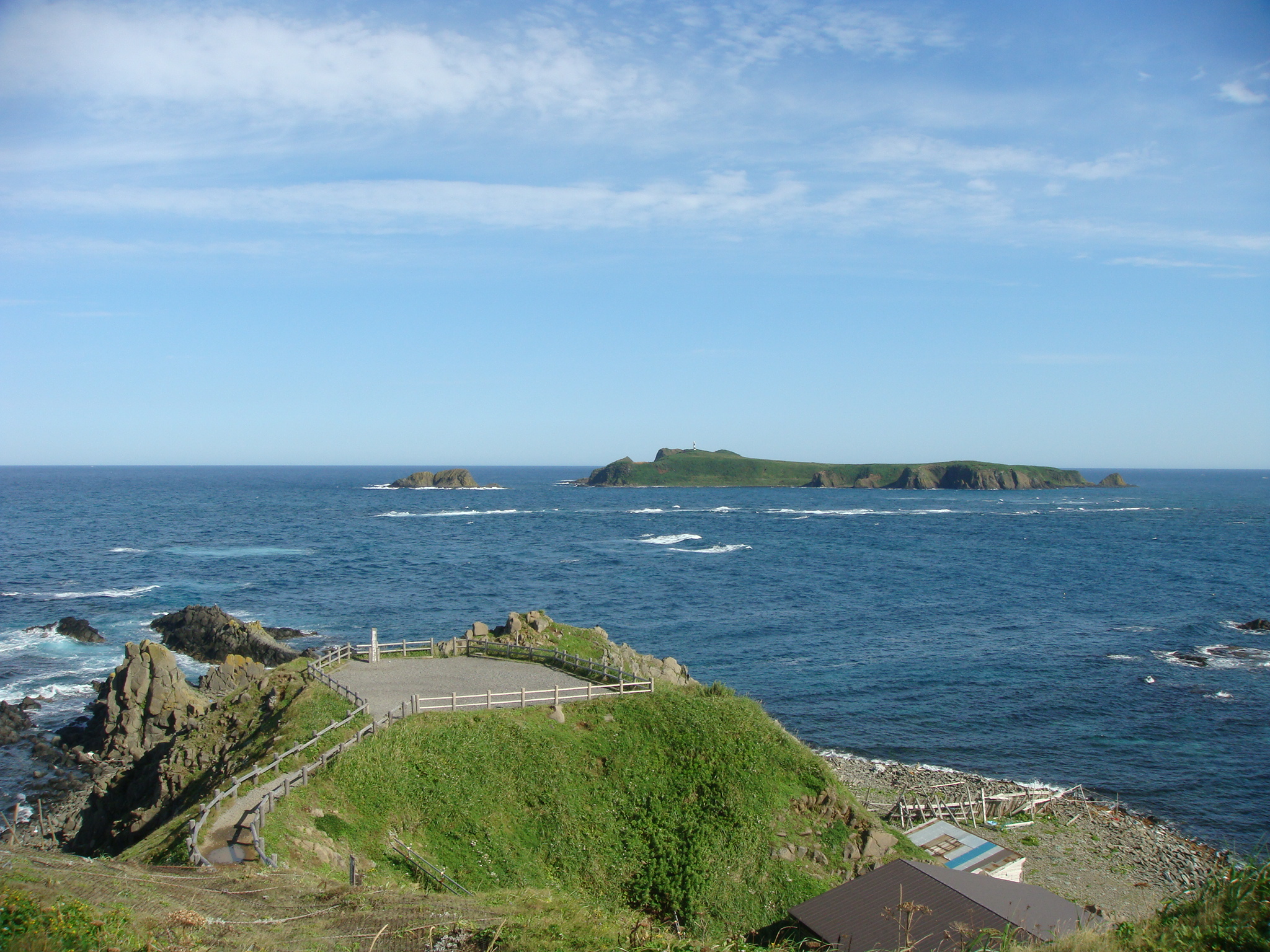
Sukoton Cape and Todo island

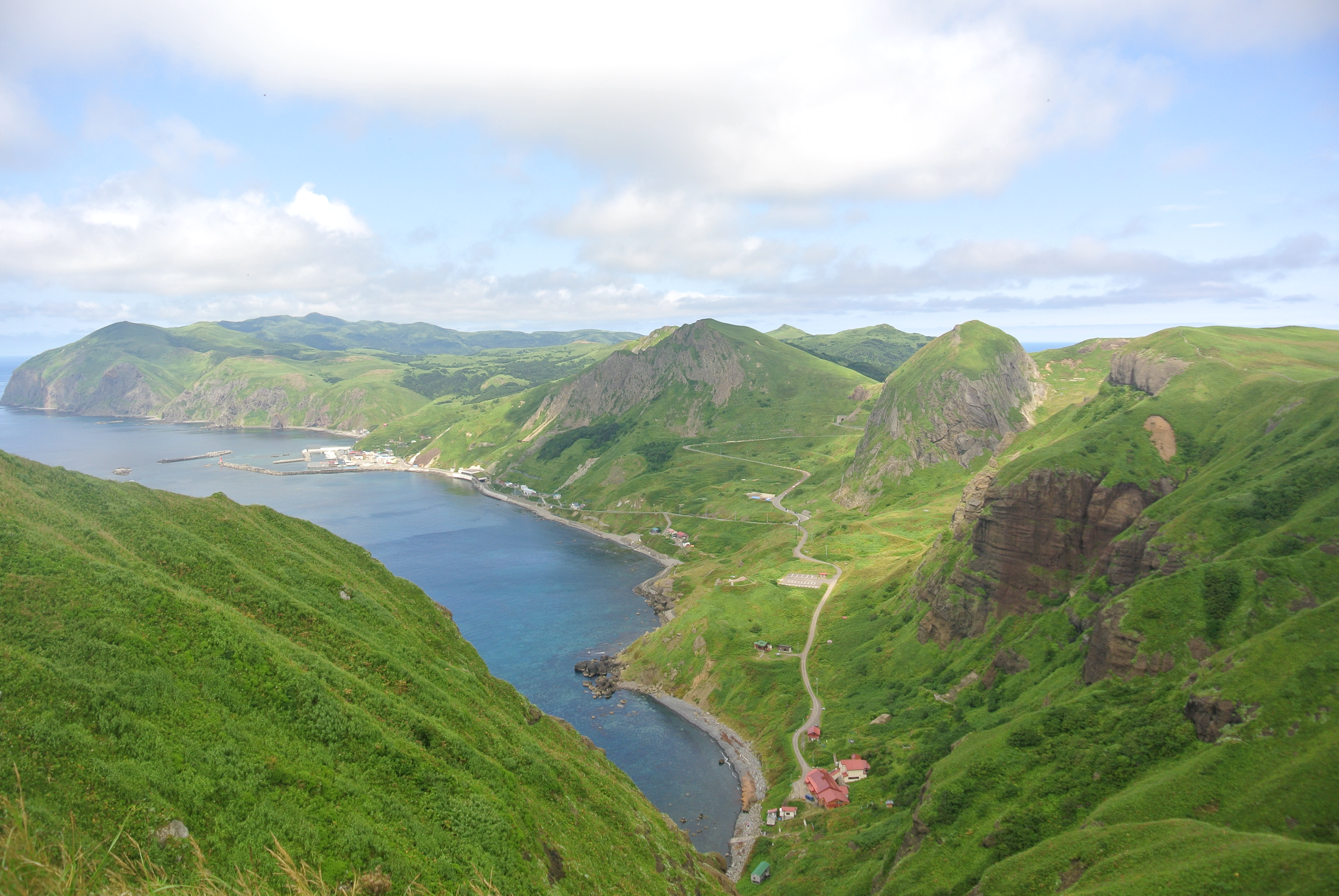
Rebun Island in 2014
