= Rishiri =

Rishiri may refer to:

- Rishiri-kombu (Laminaria ochotensis), a type of kombu
- Rishiri Island, a Japanese island
  - Rishiri, Hokkaidō, a town on Rishiri Island
  - Mount Rishiri, a volcano on Rishiri island
