= List of city nicknames in Japan =

== Cities by prefecture ==
=== Aichi ===
- Takahama
  - City of Kawara (roof tiles)
- Toyota, Nagoya
  - Castle Town of Toyota
- Yatomi
  - City of Goldfish

=== Ehime ===
- Matsuyama
  - Town of Botchan (Botchan by Natsume Sōseki)
- Imabari
  - City of Towels
  - City of Kawara (roof tiles) (Kikuma)
- Uchiko
  - City of Kite
  - City of White Walled
- Uwajima
  - City of Bullfighting
  - Hometown of Pearl

=== Fukui ===
- Sabae
  - City of Glasses

=== Fukuoka ===
The Land of Bloodbath

- Fukuoka
  - City of Yatai (street stalls)
- Yanagawa
  - Venice of Japan
  - City of Water
- Yame
  - Place of Yame-tea
- Munakata (Okinoshima)
  - Island of Gods

=== Fukushima ===
Utsukushima Fukushima (Beautiful Fukushima)

=== Gifu ===
- Gifu
  - City of Fashion
- Ōgaki
  - City of Water
- Ena (Akechi)
  - Taishō Romantic Town

=== Gunma ===
Empire of Gunma

- Maebashi
  - City of Water
- Shimonita
  - Town of Konnyaku

=== Hiroshima ===
- Fukuyama
  - City of Roses (Rose City)
  - City of Geta (Japanese footwear), mostly referred to the Matsunaga area of the city
- Fuchū
  - Home of Oomurasaki (great purple, the national butterfly of Japan)
  - Town of White Walled (Jyougecho)
- Onomichi
  - City of Hills (City of Slopes)
  - City of Movies
- Innoshima
  - Island of Flower
  - Home of Hassaku
- Akitakata
  - City of Kagura (Yachiyo-Kagura, Midori-Kagura)
- Kitahiroshima (Chiyodacho)
  - Town of Kagura (Chiyoda-Kagura)
- Kure
  - City of Hills (City of Slopes)
- Hiroshima
  - City of Peace (International City of Peace and Culture)
  - City of Rivers
  - City of Water
  - Venice of Japan
- Hatsukaichi (Miyajima)
  - Itsukushima
  - Island of God
- Kumano
  - City of Brush

=== Hokkaidō ===
- Kushiro (Akan)
  - Hometown of Tanchō (wintering ground of red-crowned crane)
- Furano
  - City of Flowers
- Hakodate
  - City of Lights
- Otaru
  - City of Hills (City of Slopes)
  - Venice of Japan
- Teshikaga (Mashuko)
  - Lake of God
- Rishiri, Rishirifuji (Rishiritou)
  - Island of Flower
- Rebun (Rebuntou)
  - Island of Flower
- Haboro (Yagishiritou)
  - Island of Flower
- Kaibatou
  - Island of Flower

=== Hyōgo ===
Hyogoslavia

- Takarazuka
  - City of Music
- Kōbe
  - City of Lights
  - City of Fashion
  - Town of Shoes (Nagata)
  - Million Dollar Lights
- Minamiawaji
  - City of Kawara (roof tiles)
- Tatsuno
  - City of Aka-tombo (red dragonfly) (Japanese nursery song)
- Awaji, Sumoto, Minamiawaji (Awajishima)
  - Island of Flower
  - Island of Mythologies
- Minamiawaji (Nushima)
  - Island of Mythologies

=== Ishikawa ===
Kaga Millon Koku

=== Iwate ===
- Tono
  - City of Folktales
- Hanamaki (Ohasama)
  - Town of Hayachine-Kagura

=== Kagawa ===
Udon Prefecture

- Ayagawa
  - Home of Sanuki Udon
- Mitoyo
  - Home of Urashima Tarō
- Takamatsu
  - Home of Momotarō story
  - Town of Bonsai
- Marugame
  - City of Uchiwa (Japanese rigid paper fan)

=== Kagoshima ===
- Kagoshima
  - Naples of the Orient
  - Venice of Japan
  - City of Ishin (Meiji Restoration)
  - City of Streetcars
- Tokunoshima, Isen, Amagi, Kagoshima (Tokunoshima)
  - Town of Bullfighting
- Izumi
  - Hometown (wintering ground) of Nabezuru (hooded crane), Kurozuru (common crane), Manazuru (white-necked crane)
- Ōshima-gun (Okinoerabujima)
  - Island of Flower

=== Kanagawa ===
- Kamakura
  - Ancient City
  - City of History
- Minamiashigara
  - Home of Kintaro (a Japanese folk hero)

=== Kōchi ===
- Kōchi
  - Birthplace of Yosakoi-Matsuri (traditional summer dance festival)

=== Kumamoto ===
- Kumamoto
  - City of Woods
- Nagasu
  - Town of Goldfish
- Uki
  - City of Dekopon (a Japanese orange_

=== Kyoto ===
- Kyoto
  - Kyo
  - Ancient City
  - City of History
- Ine
  - Home of Urashima Tarō
- Uji
  - Place of Uji-tea
- Maizuru (Kammurijima)
  - Island of God

=== Mie ===
- Iga
  - Hometown of Ninja
- Shima
  - Home of Urashima Tarō
  - Hometown of Pearl

=== Miyagi ===
- Sendai
  - City of Trees (City of Green) (Capital with the Groves)
- Shibata
  - City of Chrysanthemum

=== Miyazaki ===
- Takachiho
  - Town of Mythologies
  - Town of Takachiho-Kagura

=== Nagasaki ===
- Nagasaki
  - City of Peace
  - City of Hills (City of Slopes)
  - City of Lights
  - City of Streetcars
  - Naples of the Orient (Naples of Japan)
- Iki (Iki Island)
  - Island of Mythologies

=== Nara ===
- Nara
  - Ancient City
- Yamatokoriyama
  - City of Goldfish

=== Niigata ===
- Ojiya
  - Home of Nishikigoi
  - City of Bullfighting
- Niigata, Shirone
  - City of Kite
- Sado
  - Island of Flower

=== Ōita ===
Onsen Prefecture

- Beppu
  - Naples of the Orient
  - Hot spring Capital of the World
- Bungotakada
  - City of Shōwa

=== Okayama ===
- Okayama
  - Hometown of Momotarō
- Kurashiki
  - City of White Walled
  - Venice of Japan
- Bisei
  - Home of Stars
- Kasaoka (Manabeshima, Takashima)
  - Island of Flower
  - Island of Mythologies
- Takahashi (Nariwacho)
  - Town of Bitchu-Kagura

=== Okinawa ===
- Naha
  - Capital of the Ryūkyū Kingdom
- Itoman
  - City of Peace
- Uruma
  - City of Bullfighting
- Nanjo (Kudakajima)
  - Island of God
  - Island of Mythologies
- Uruma (Hamahigashima)
  - Island of God
  - Island of Mythologies
- Nakijin (Kourijima)
  - Island of God
- Kohama
  - Hometown of Churasan

=== Osaka ===
- Osaka
  - Naniwa
  - City of Water
  - Venice of Japan
  - City of Business
  - City of Kuidaore (eat until you drop)
- Sakai
  - Venice of Japan
- Izumisano
  - Rinku Town
  - City of Towels
- Kishiwada
  - City of Danjiri Matsuri

=== Saga ===
- Karatsu
  - City of Karatsu Kunchi
- Kawasoe
  - City of Nori

=== Saitama ===
- Saitama
  - Town of Bonsai
- Kazo
  - City of Koinobori
- Kounosu, Iwatsuki
  - Town of Dolls
  - Town of Hina-ningyo (dolls for Girls' Dayy)
  - Town of Gogatsu-ningyo (dolls for Children's Day)

=== Shiga ===
- Kōka
  - Hometown of Ninja

=== Shimane ===
- Matsue
  - City of Water
  - Venice of Japan
  - City of Kawara (roof tiles)
- Izumo
  - City of Mythologies
- Gotsu (Sakuraecho)
  - Town of Kagura (Omoto-Kagura)
- Hamada (Kanagi)
  - Town of Iwami-Kagura
- Oda
  - City of Iwami Ginzan Silver Mine
- Okinoshima
  - Island of Pictures
  - Island of Flower
  - Town of Bullfighting

=== Shizuoka ===
- Atami
  - City of Lights
  - Naples of the Orient
- Fuji
  - City of Paper
- Hamamatsu
  - City of Music
- Oyama
  - Hometown of Kintaro (a folk hero)
- Shizuoka, Okabe, Fujieda
  - Places of Shizuoka-tea

=== Tokushima ===
- Tokushima
  - Birthplace of Awa Dance Festival

=== Tokyo ===
Flowery City

- Shibuya, Harajuku
  - Town for Young People
- Sugamo
  - Obaachan no Harajuku (Grandma's Harajuku)
- Akihabara
  - Town for Otaku
  - The Electric Town
- Katsushika-Shibamata
  - Hometown of Tora-san (from the film series Otoko wa Tsurai yo)
- Fuchū
  - City of Woods
- Shinjuku
  - City of the Beasts (from manga and anime series Hyper Police)

=== Tottori ===
- Kurayoshi
  - City of White Walled
  - City of Red Roof
- Sakaiminato
  - City of Yōkai (from the manga series Ge Ge Ge no Kitaro)

=== Toyama ===
- Toyama
  - City of Medicine

=== Yamagata ===
- Higashine
  - City of Cherries
- Nanyō
  - City of Chrysanthemum

=== Yamaguchi ===
- Hagi
  - City of "Ishin" (Meiji Restoration)
- Yanai
  - City of White Walled
- Iwakuni
  - Taishō Romantic Town
- Shimonoseki
  - City of Fuku (pufferfish) ("Fuku": Happiness)
- Shimonoseki (Futaoijima)
  - Island of Mythologies
- Shunan
  - Hometown of Nabezuru (wintering ground of hooded crane)

=== Yamanashi ===
- Hokuto (Nagasaka)
  - Town of Oomurasaki (great purple, the national butterfly of Japan)

== Cities referred to as Little Kyoto, by region ==
In Japanese Little Kyoto (小京都, Sho-Kyoto).

=== Tōhoku ===
- Hirosaki, Aomori
- Iwadeyama, Miyagi
- Kakunodate, Akita
- Morioka, Iwate
- Murata, Miyagi
- Sakata, Yamagata
- Tono, Iwate
- Yamagata, Yamagata
- Yuzawa, Akita

=== Kantō, Kōshinetsu ===
- Ashikaga, Tochigi
- Iida, Nagano
- Iiyama, Nagano
- Kamo, Niigata
- Koga, Ibaraki
- Ogawa, Saitama
- Ranzan, Saitama
- Sano, Tochigi
- Tochigi, Tochigi
- Yugawara, Kanagawa

=== Chūbu (Hokuriku, Tōkai) ===
- Gujohachiman, Gifu
- Inuyama, Aichi
- Johana, Toyama
- Kanazawa, Ishikawa
- Nishio, Aichi
- Obama, Fukui
- Takayama, Gifu

=== Kinki ===
- Igaueno, Mie
- Izushi, Hyogo
- Sasayama, Hyogo
- Tatsuno, Hyogo

=== Chūgoku (San'in, San'yō) ===
- Hagi, Yamaguchi
- Kurayoshi, Tottori
- Matsue, Shimane
- Onomichi, Hiroshima
- Takahashi, Okayama
- Takehara, Hiroshima
- Tsuwano, Shimane
- Tsuyama, Okayama
- Yamaguchi, Yamaguchi

=== Shikoku ===
- Nakamura, Kōchi
- Ōzu, Ehime

=== Kyūshū ===
- Asakura, Fukuoka
- Chiran, Kagoshima
- Hita, Oita
- Hitoyoshi, Kumamoto
- Imari, Saga
- Kitsuki, Oita
- Nichinan, Miyazaki
- Ogi, Saga

== Cities referred to as Little Edo, by region ==
In Japanese Little Edo (小江戸, Ko-Edo).

=== Kantō ===
- Atsugi, Kanagawa
- Katori, Chiba
- Kawagoe, Saitama
- Otaki, Chiba
- Tochigi, Tochigi

=== Tōkai ===
- Iwata, Shizuoka (Asaba, Shizuoka)

=== Kinki ===
- Hikone, Shiga

== See also ==
- Lists of nicknames – nickname list articles on Wikipedia
