= Shiroi Koibito =

Japanese cookie

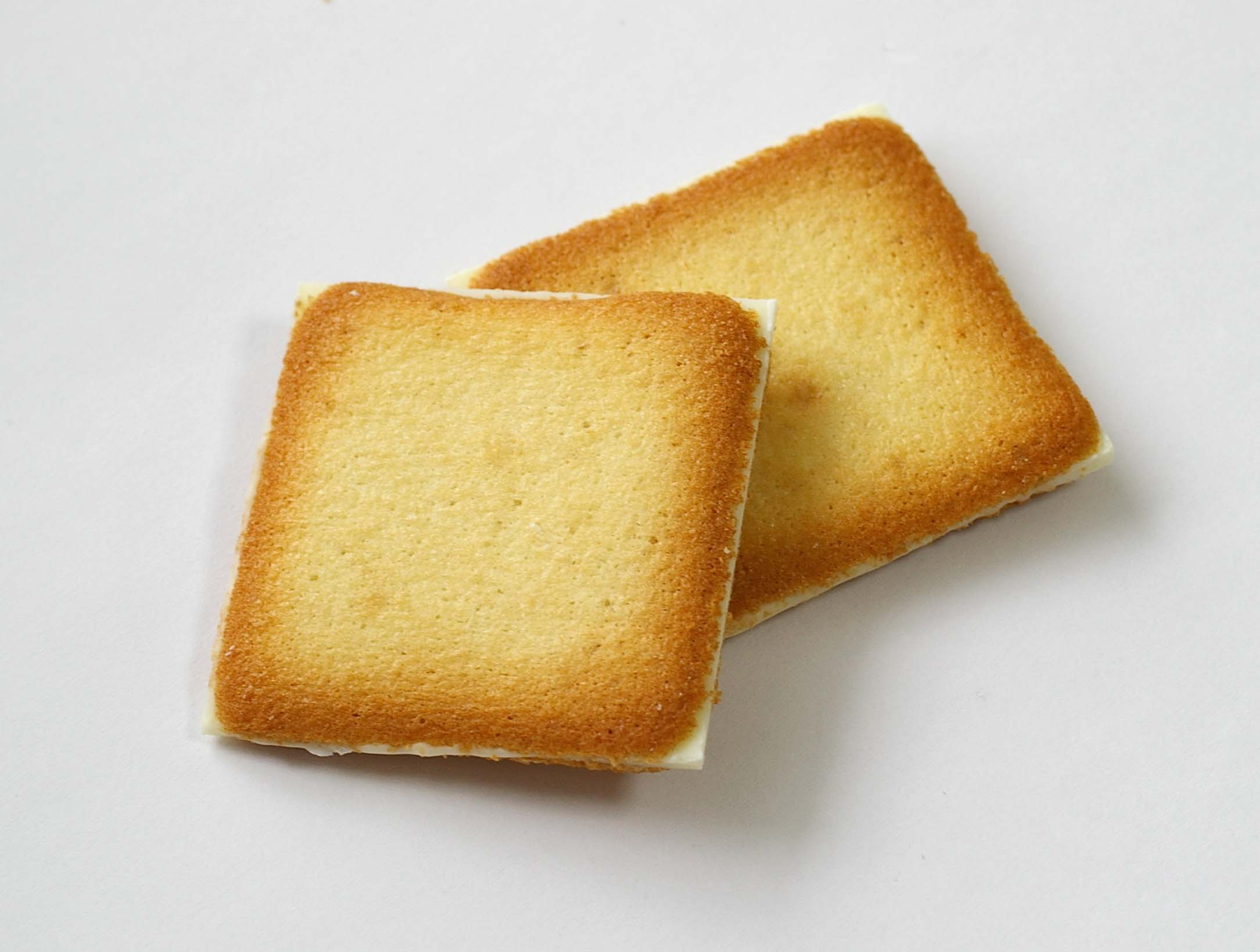
Shiroi Koibito

Shiroi Koibito (白い恋人; literally "white lover") is a European-style cookie manufactured and sold by Japanese confectionery maker Ishiya Co., Ltd. in Sapporo, Hokkaido. It consists of chocolate sandwiched between langue de chat. There are two main types: Shiroi Koibito White with white chocolate in the centre and Shiroi Koibito Black with milk chocolate in the centre. The package design has a white and light blue base with a picture of Rishiri Island's Mount Rishiri arranged in the centre.

== Summary ==
Sales began in December 1976. The name originated one day in December while the founder was returning home after enjoying some skiing and casually remarked "It has started snowing white lovers." This is mentioned on the back of the box. The fact that the product's white colour is reminiscent of Hokkaido's snowy scenery and that sales are limited only to Hokkaido brought success, and it gained popularity as a souvenir on business trips and holidays.

As of 2003, yearly sales have risen to around two hundred million units. Shiroi Koibito ranks second nationally in souvenir unit sales following Akafukumochi (from Mie prefecture). A trade journal selected "souvenirs that represent the 20th century" based on a survey and Shiroi Koibito came in first place. In 1986, it won first prize in Monde Selection.

There is also a service to custom-order Shiroi Koibito with a photographic portrait of your choosing on the package. Additionally, "Shiroi Koibito Chocolate Drink" went on sale in 1997 as a sister product.

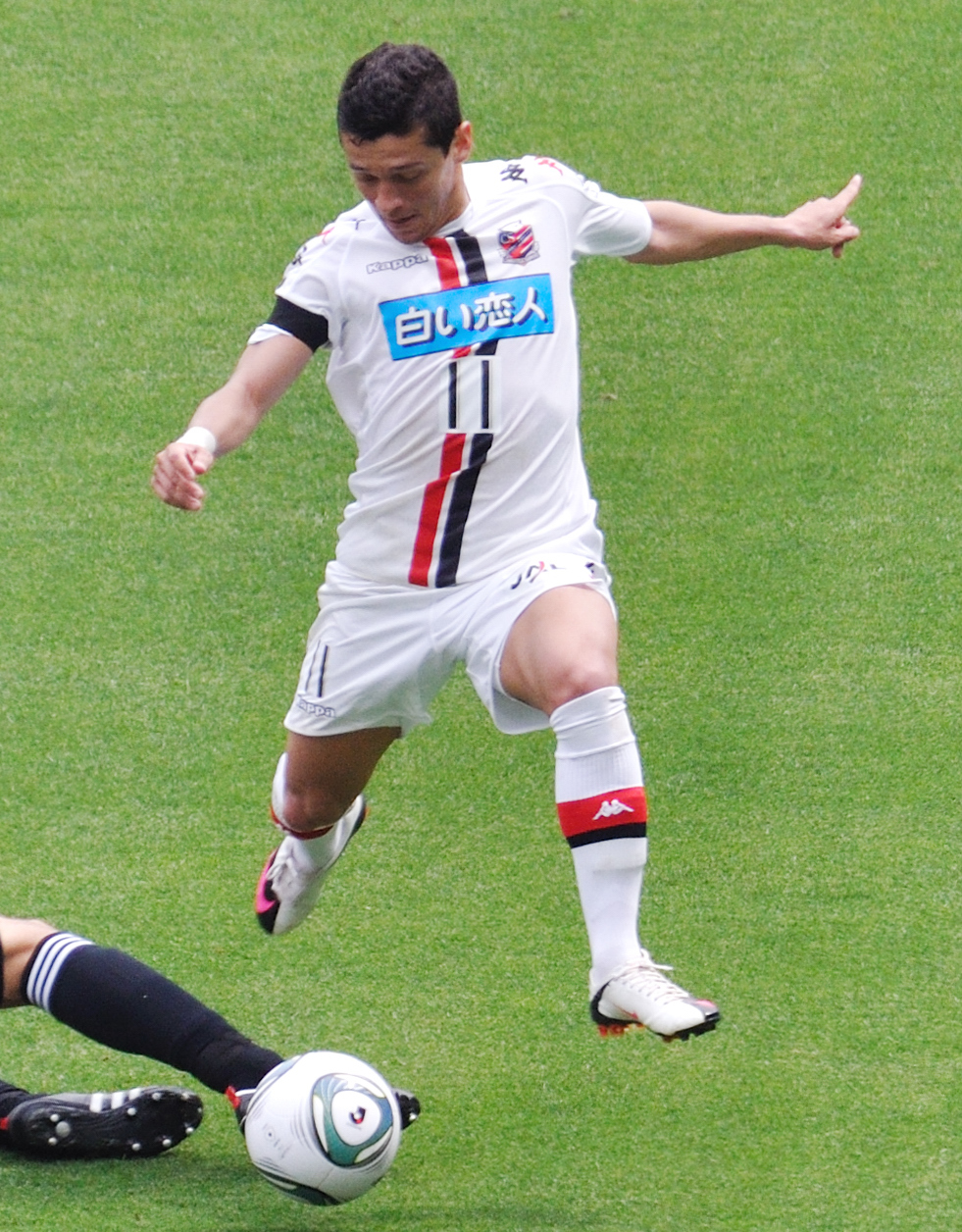
Andrezinho playing for Hokkaido Consadole Sapporo, sponsored by Shiroi Koibito.

As Ishiya Co. is the official sponsor of Hokkaido Consadole Sapporo in the J.League, the Shiroi Koibito logo is displayed on their kits.

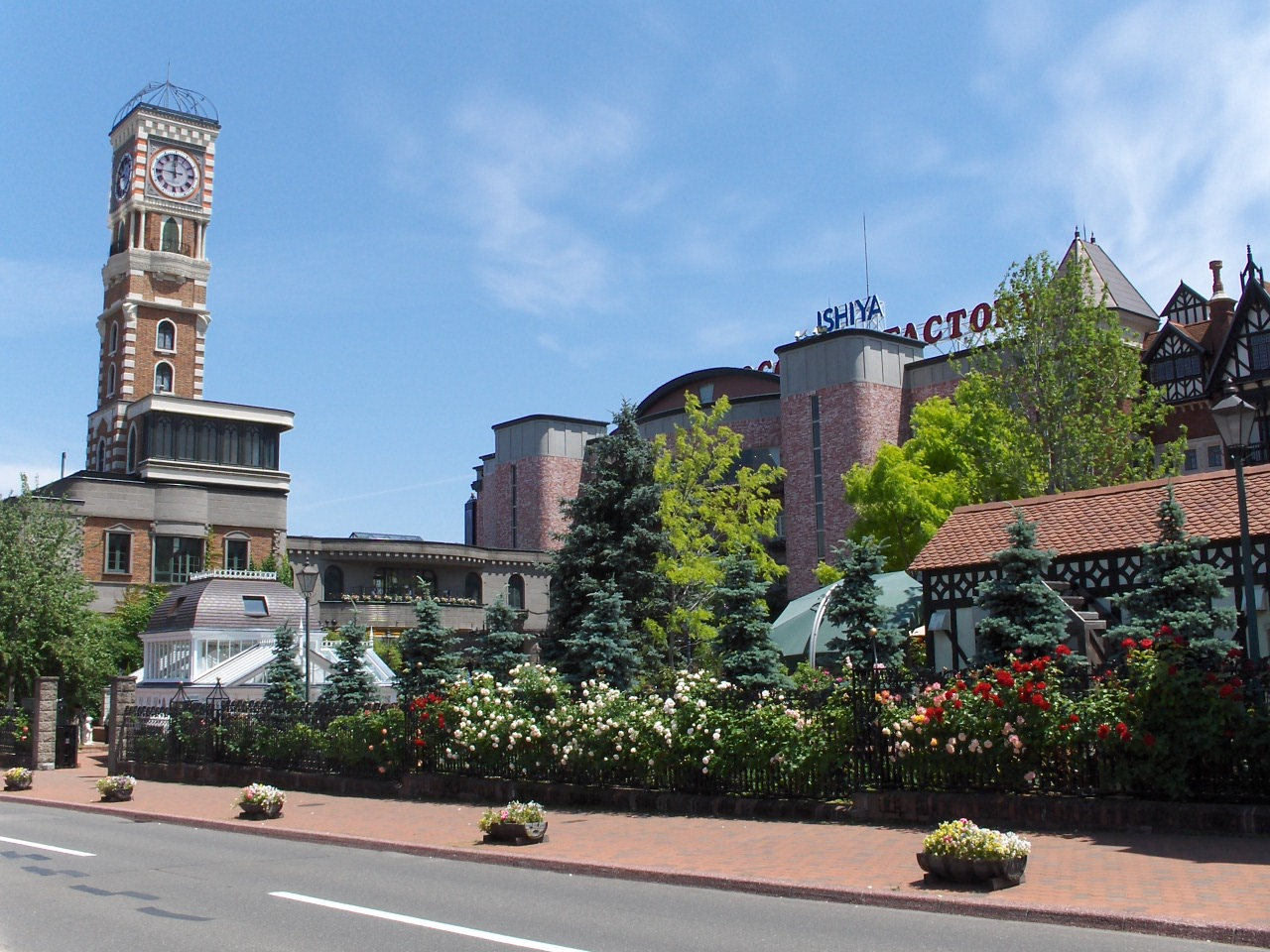
Shiroi Koibito Park.

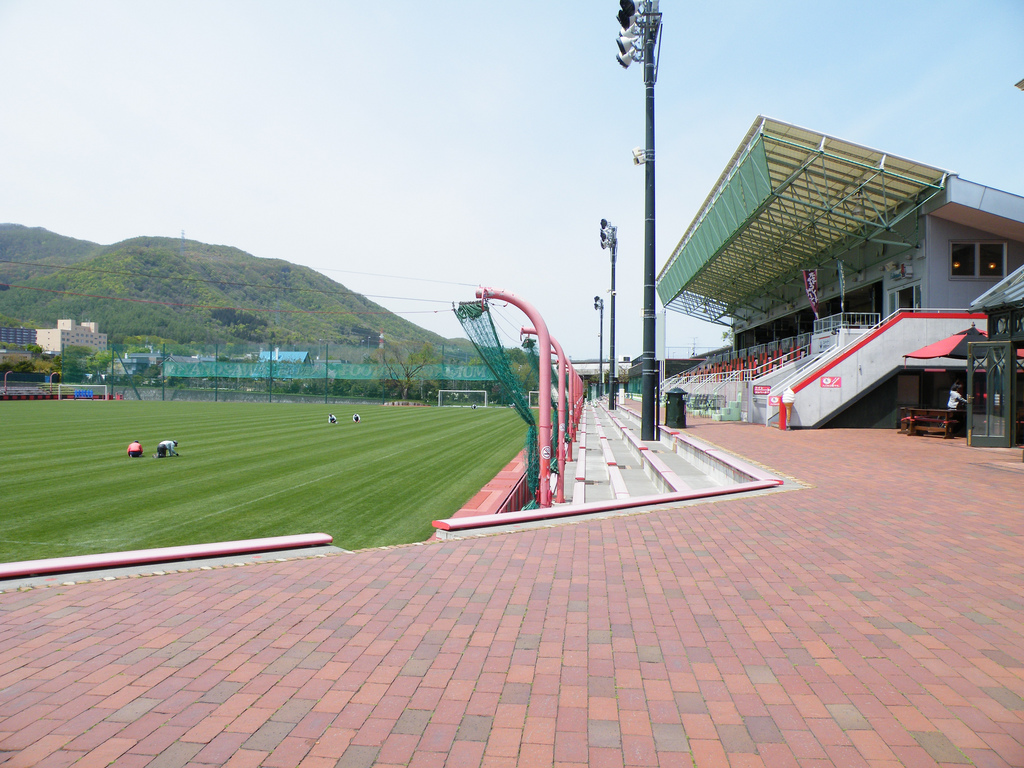
Miyanosawa Shiroi Koibito Football Stadium.

In Sapporo City West Ward there is a facility named "Shiroi Koibito Park" where one can see the Shiroi Koibito production line, history of the chocolate and artwork among other things such as the Ishiya Chocolate Factory, Consadole Sapporo's training grounds, known as Miyanosawa Shiroi Koibito Football Stadium, and their clubhouse, also visitors are able to take classes in making Shiroi Koibito-style sweets. In the vicinity of the former National Route 5 on the banks of the Hassamu River and around National Route 36 there are giant billboards based on the Consadole Sapporo uniform's image.

=== Punishment for falsifying best before date ===
In August 2007, sales were suspended as a portion of the Shiroi Koibito stock was being sold with a falsified best before date, in violation of both Food Hygiene Law and Japanese Agricultural Standard Law.

=== Resumption of production and sales ===
On October 22, 2007, CEO Shunpei Shimada held a press conference, in which he officially announced that production would resume on November 15, with sales resuming on November 22. After the incident, the best before date was printed on individual packets.

Sales resumed in 400 stores on November 22, but there was a flood of fans awaiting the return and every store completely sold out on the same day. Subsequent stock shortages continued, and other sweets that Ishiya had planned on resuming production of were temporarily delayed in order to cope.

=== Derivative products ===
In Autumn 2003, "Shiroi Roll Cake" went on sale. At first it was only sold in Hokkaido Bussanten (food and products fair) and Shiroi Koibito Park, but nationwide online sales began on March 3, 2011.

In addition, sales of "Shiroi Baum Tsumugi" (baumkuchen with Shiroi Koibito's white chocolate kneaded into the dough) commenced on December 17, 2009.

== Trademark infringement lawsuit ==
On November 28, 2011, Ishiya sued Yoshimoto Kogyo for suspension of sales on the grounds of trademark infringement and under the Unfair Competition Prevention Law in relation to their imitation product "Omoshiroi Koibito" (jp:面白い恋人, lit. "Interesting Lover") sold with similar packaging and a similar name.

A settlement between Ishiya and Yoshimoto Kogyo was reached on February 13, 2013, Yoshimoto Kogyo changed the package design, and sales were restricted to the Kansai region.

Other products resembling Shiroi Koibito, "Doara no Koibito" (sold by Nagatoya Co., Ltd.) and "Nijigen no Koibito" (sold by Daito Corporation) among others, are manufactured and sold all over Japan.
