= Esanbe Hanakita Kojima =

Island of Hokkaido, Japan

Native name: エサンベ鼻北小島
- Location within Hokkaido Location within Japan

Geography
- Coordinates: 45°20′5.9″N 142°10′52.9″E
- Highest elevation: 1.4 m (4.6 ft)

Demographics
- Population: 0

Esanbe Hanakita Kojima (エサンベ鼻北小島) is a uninhabited island that sits around 1,650 feet off the northern Japanese island of Hokkaido in the Sea of Okhotsk.

Esanbe Hanakita Kojima was located 500 meters off Sarufutsu on the northern main island of Hokkaido in the Sea of Okhotsk. The island received its name in 2014. At a survey in 1987, its highest point was 1.40 meters above sea level. In October 2018, residents of Sarufutsu found that it was missing, it was determined that the island was underwater. This has been ascribed to erosion by wind and by drift ice, which forms in the sea during winters. The disappearance of the island, if confirmed, would lead to the reduction of Japan's exclusive economic zone in this part of the sea by half a kilometre.

== See also ==
- Sōya Subprefecture
- List of islands of Japan
