= Rishiri District, Hokkaido =

Coordinates: 45°10′48″N 141°14′24″E

Rishiri District
- Rishiri District, Hokkaido
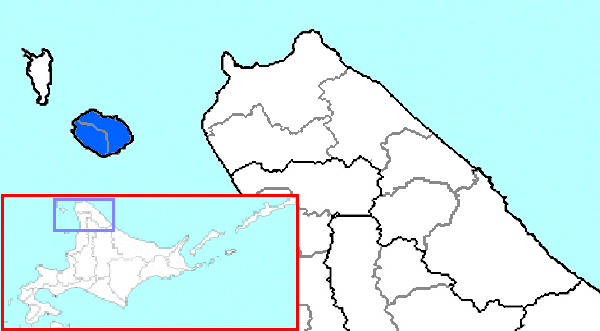
- The area of Rishiri District in Sōya Subprefecture.
- Country: Japan
- Region: Rishiri Island
- District: Hokkaido
- Subprefecture: Sōya

Area
  - Land: 182.18 km^{2} (70.34 sq mi)

Rishiri (利尻郡, Rishiri-gun) is a district located in Sōya Subprefecture, Hokkaido, Japan. The district encompasses Rishiri Island, situated in the Sea of Japan, to the west of the northern tip of Hokkaido.

== Population ==
As of 2004, the district has an estimated population of 5,525 and a population density of 30.33 persons per km^{2}. The total area of the district is 182.18 km^{2}.

== Transportation ==
Rishiri Airport is located in Rishirifuji.

== Towns and villages ==
- Rishiri
- Rishirifuji
