= Sōya District, Hokkaido =

District in Hokkaido, Japan

Coordinates: 45.243°N 142.122°E

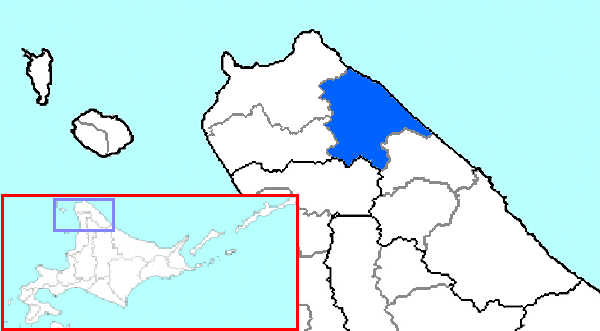
The area of Sōya Districts in Sōya Subprefecture.

Sōya (宗谷郡, Sōya-gun) is a district located in Sōya Subprefecture, Hokkaido, Japan.

As of 2004, the district has an estimated population of 2,925 and a density of 4.96 persons per km^{2}. The total area is 590.00 km^{2}.

== Towns and villages ==
- Sarufutsu
