= Rishirifuji, Hokkaido =

Rishirifuji 利尻富士町
- Town
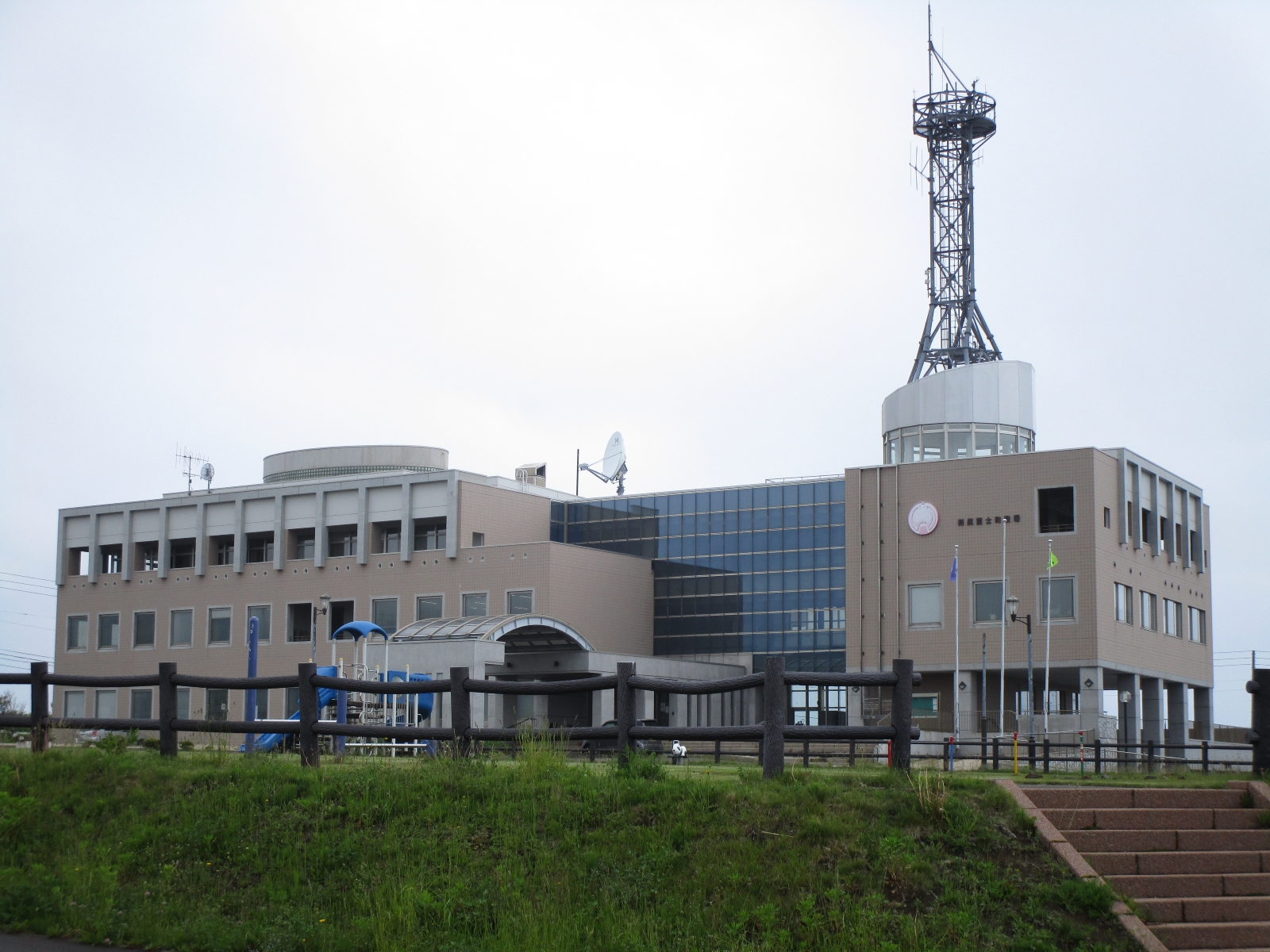
- Rishirifuji Town Hall

- Flag Seal

- Location of Rishirifuji in Hokkaido (Sōya Subprefecture)

- Location in Japan
- Coordinates: 45°15′N 141°13′E
- Country: Japan
- Region: Hokkaido
- Prefecture: Hokkaido (Sōya Subprefecture)
- District: Rishiri

Government
  - Mayor: Tsutomu Yoshida

Area
  - Total: 105.69 km^{2} (40.81 sq mi)

Population (30 September 2016)
  - Total: 2,665
  - Density: 25.22/km^{2} (65.31/sq mi)
- Time zone: UTC+09:00 (JST)
- City hall address: 6 Oshidomari Fujino, Rishirifuji-chō, Rishiri-gun, Hokkaidō; 097-0101
- Website: www.town.rishirifuji.hokkaido.jp
- Symbols
- Bird: Rishirifuji komadori (Erithacus akahige Rishirifujiensis)
- Flower: Rishirihinageshi (Papaver fauriei)
- Tree: Jezo spruce and Japanese rowan

Rishirifuji (利尻富士町, Rishirifuji-chō) is a town located on Rishiri Island in Sōya Subprefecture, Hokkaido, Japan.

As of September 2016, the town has an estimated population of 2,665 and a density of 25 persons per km^{2}. The total area is 105.69 km^{2}.

== History ==
- 1956: Oniwaki village and Oshidomari village merge, forming Higashirishiri village.
- 1959: Higashirishiri village becomes Higashirishiri town.
- 1990: Higarishiri is renamed Rishirifuji.

== Geography ==
Situated on Rishiri Island, it is surrounded by the Sea of Japan. Mount Rishiri, also known as Rishirifuji, is located on the border between the town of Rishiri to the south, with an elevation of 1721m.

=== Climate ===
Temperatures can drop to -10 °C the winter and summers are quite cool. There is adequate precipitation throughout the year.

=== Neighbouring municipalities ===
- Sōya Subprefecture, Hokkaido
- Rishiri

== Demographics ==
Per Japanese census data, the population of Rishirifuji has declined in recent decades.

Historical population
Year	Pop.	±%
2000	3,536	—
2010	3,037	−14.1%
2020	2,458	−19.1%

== Transportation ==
Rishiri Airport is located in Rishirifuji, which has flights to New Chitose Airport in Sapporo. The company Heartland regulates ships to Wakkanai on mainland Hokkaido and Rebun on Rebun Island nearby.

== Mascots ==
Lip-kun and Lip-chan, the town's mascots

Rishirifuji's mascots are Lip-kun (りっぷくん) and Lip-chan (りっぷちゃん). They are nature-loving chipmunk siblings who lived in Mount Rishiri. Their tails and their bellies are their charm point. They lived next door to Rishirin (the mascot of Rishiri). While they are on their break, they relax in the Rishirifuji Onsen and enjoyed eating sea urchin served with kelp and drinking water from the Kanro spring. However, they had to go to school as they are still at a young age. During the winter, they played with snow. During the summer, they go hiking.

- Lip-kun is Lip-chan's curious yet mischievous brother. He is good at sculpting with snow and ice.
- Lip-chan is a Lip-kun's gentle sister. She is a good cook.
