= Sarufutsu, Hokkaido =

Sarufutsu 猿払村
- Village
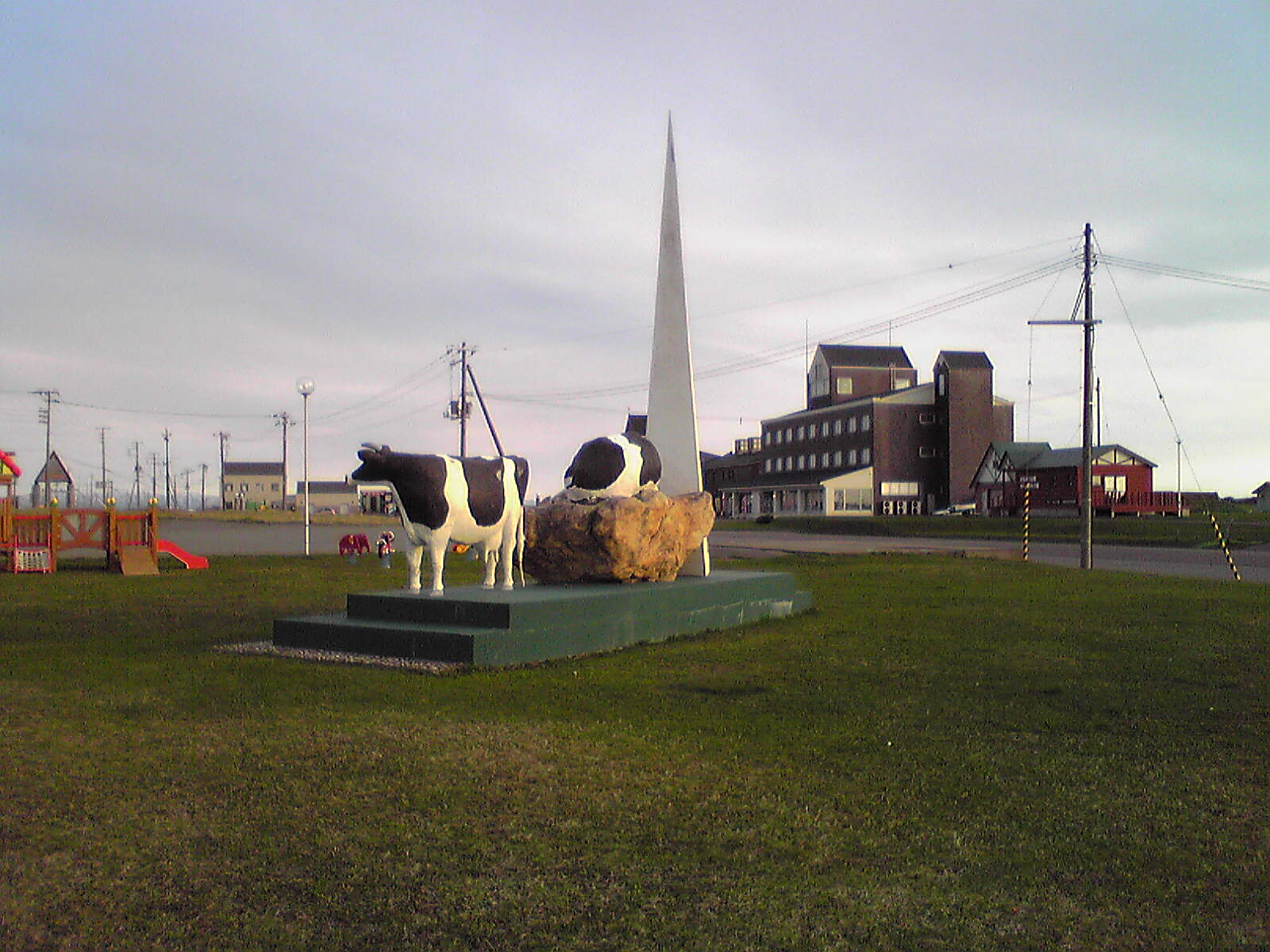
- Sarufutsu Park

- Flag Seal
- Location of Sarufutsu in Hokkaido (Sōya Subprefecture)

- Location in Japan
- Coordinates: 45°19′50″N 142°6′32″E
- Country: Japan
- Region: Hokkaido
- Prefecture: Hokkaido (Sōya Subprefecture)
- District: Sōya

Area
  - Total: 589.99 km^{2} (227.80 sq mi)

Population (June 30, 2024)
  - Total: 2,647
  - Density: 4.487/km^{2} (11.62/sq mi)
- Time zone: UTC+09:00 (JST)
- City hall address: 172 Onishibetsu-nishi, Sarufutsu-mura, Sōya-gun, Hokkaidō 098-6292
- Climate: Dfb
- Website: Official website
- Symbols
- Flower: Vaccinium vitis-idaea
- Tree: Rowan

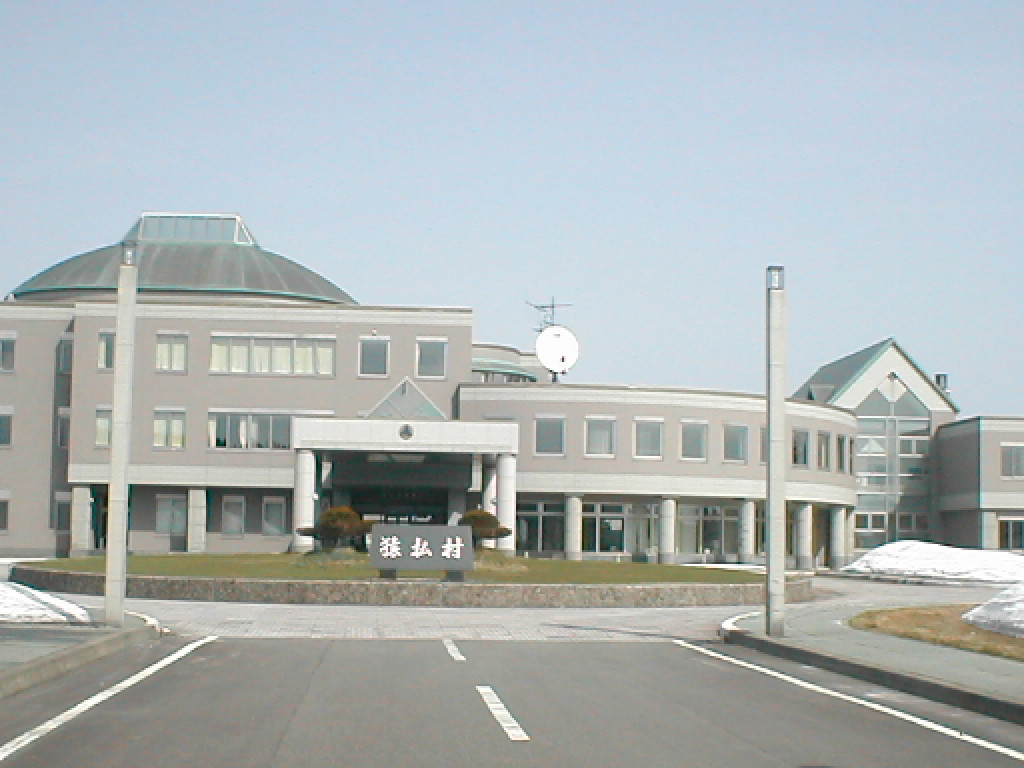
Sarufutsu Town Hall

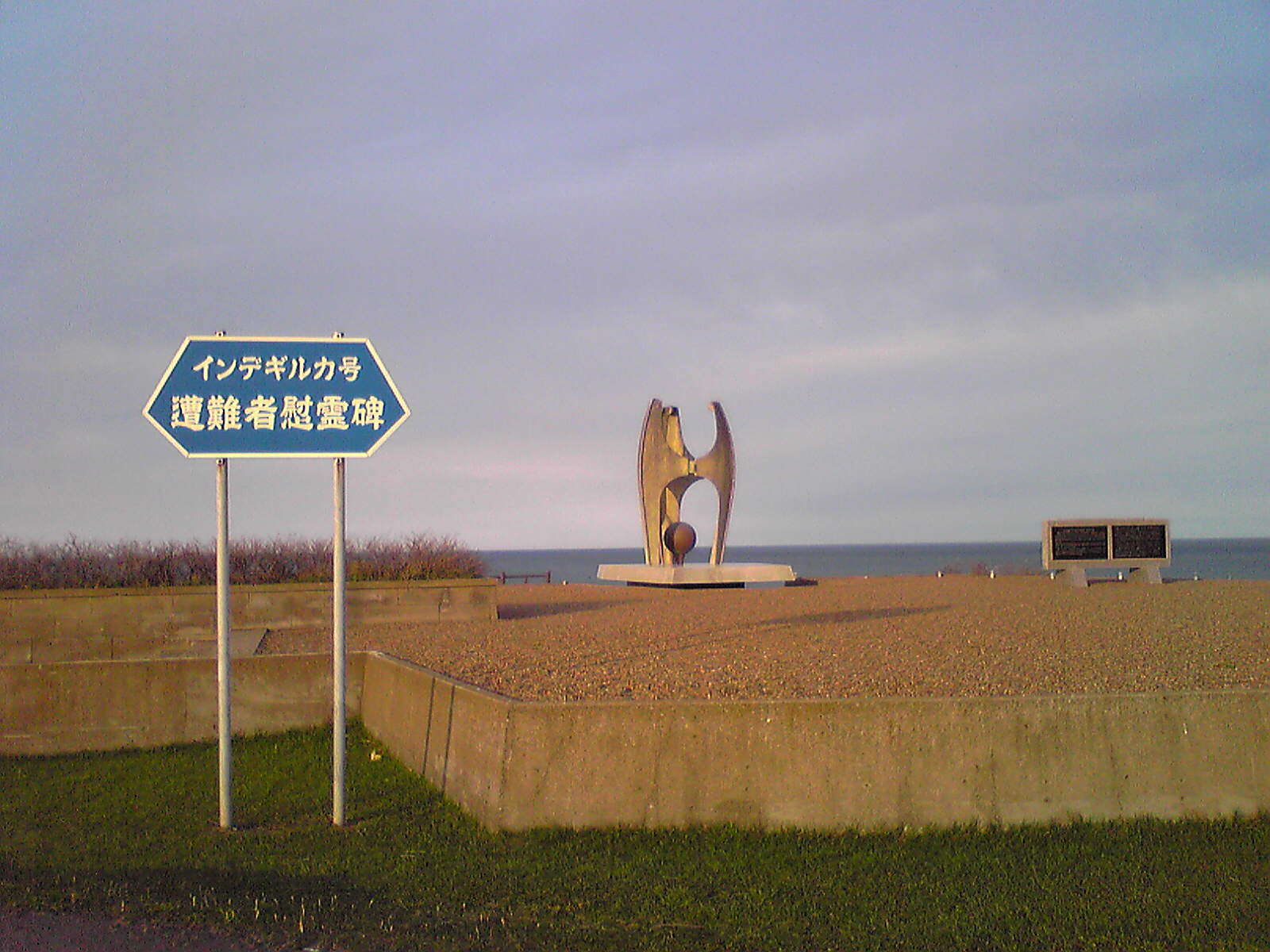
Indigirka Memorial

Sarufutsu (猿払村, Sarufutsu-mura) is a village located in Sōya Subprefecture, Hokkaido, Japan. As of 30 June 2024, the village had an estimated population of 2,647 in 1,305 households, and a population density of 4.5 people per km^{2}. The total area of the village is 589.99 km^{2} (227.80 sq mi).

== Geography ==
Sarufutsu is the northernmost village in Japan and is the largest village in Hokkaido in area. Located on the Tonbetsu Plain, it faces the Sea of Okhotsk to the east where, during the winter, there is drift ice. The western part is hilly and mountainous. 80% of the village's total area is covered by forests. Parts of the village are within the borders of the North Okhotsk Prefectural Natural Park.

- Mountains: Mount Horoshiri
- Rivers: Sarufutsu River
- Lakes: Poro Swamp, Kamuito Swamp, Mokeuni Swamp

=== Neighbouring municipalities ===
- Hokkaido
  - Wakkanai
  - Toyotomi
  - Hamatonbestu
  - Horonobe

=== Settlements/Localities within Sarufutsu ===
- Ashino (芦野)
- Asajino (浅茅野)
- Chiraibetsu (知来別)
- Hamaonishibetsu (浜鬼志別)
- Hamasarufutsu (浜猿払)
- Koishi (小石) In the 1960s to early-1970s, Koishi was the largest settlement in Sarufutsu with several thousand people working in the coal industry. It had its own hospital, as well as a movie theater. With the decline of the coal industry across Japan, the population also drastically dropped in Koishi, and its current population is less than 50 people.
- Onishibetsu (鬼志別) (Town Hall is located here)

=== Climate ===
Sarufutsu has cold and temperate climate considered to be Dfb according to the Köppen-Geiger climate classification. There is a considerable amount of rainfall even during months that typically experience dry weather. The average annual temperature in Sarufutsu is 6.0 °C. Each year, there is an approximate 1089 mm of precipitation. The temperatures are highest on average in August, at around 19.3 °C, and lowest in January, at around -6.5 °C.

Climate data for Hamaonishibetsu, Sarufutsu, elevation 13 m (43 ft), (1991−2020 normals, extremes 1978−present)
Month	Jan	Feb	Mar	Apr	May	Jun	Jul	Aug	Sep	Oct	Nov	Dec	Year
Record high °C (°F)	5.1 (41.2)	9.3 (48.7)	14.5 (58.1)	22.4 (72.3)	27.6 (81.7)	28.3 (82.9)	32.7 (90.9)	32.4 (90.3)	30.8 (87.4)	23.3 (73.9)	18.3 (64.9)	11.1 (52.0)	32.7 (90.9)
Mean daily maximum °C (°F)	−3.2 (26.2)	−2.9 (26.8)	0.9 (33.6)	7.1 (44.8)	12.2 (54.0)	15.2 (59.4)	19.1 (66.4)	21.7 (71.1)	19.7 (67.5)	13.7 (56.7)	5.5 (41.9)	−0.9 (30.4)	9.0 (48.2)
Daily mean °C (°F)	−5.9 (21.4)	−6.0 (21.2)	−2.1 (28.2)	3.5 (38.3)	8.2 (46.8)	11.8 (53.2)	15.9 (60.6)	18.4 (65.1)	15.5 (59.9)	9.4 (48.9)	2.2 (36.0)	−3.5 (25.7)	5.6 (42.1)
Mean daily minimum °C (°F)	−9.8 (14.4)	−10.9 (12.4)	−6.5 (20.3)	−0.5 (31.1)	4.4 (39.9)	8.5 (47.3)	13.1 (55.6)	15.2 (59.4)	10.8 (51.4)	4.5 (40.1)	−1.5 (29.3)	−7.0 (19.4)	1.7 (35.1)
Record low °C (°F)	−26.6 (−15.9)	−27.2 (−17.0)	−23.9 (−11.0)	−12.2 (10.0)	−5.6 (21.9)	−2.2 (28.0)	1.7 (35.1)	5.2 (41.4)	0.5 (32.9)	−4.6 (23.7)	−13.2 (8.2)	−18.1 (−0.6)	−27.2 (−17.0)
Average precipitation mm (inches)	61.1 (2.41)	42.7 (1.68)	45.1 (1.78)	42.7 (1.68)	62.5 (2.46)	63.0 (2.48)	109.2 (4.30)	125.7 (4.95)	119.6 (4.71)	118.0 (4.65)	110.6 (4.35)	91.2 (3.59)	995.0 (39.17)
Average snowfall cm (inches)	205 (81)	161 (63)	126 (50)	18 (7.1)	0 (0)	0 (0)	0 (0)	0 (0)	0 (0)	1 (0.4)	75 (30)	196 (77)	780 (307)
Average extreme snow depth cm (inches)	69 (27)	75 (30)	69 (27)	21 (8.3)	0 (0)	0 (0)	0 (0)	0 (0)	0 (0)	1 (0.4)	22 (8.7)	47 (19)	75 (30)
Average precipitation days (≥ 1.0 mm)	17.9	13.4	12.7	9.7	9.6	9.3	9.8	10.0	12.4	15.3	17.6	18.8	156.5
Average snowy days (≥ 3.0 cm)	22.3	19.4	16.0	2.5	0	0	0	0	0	0.1	8.0	19.8	88.1
Mean monthly sunshine hours	68.4	97.9	149.2	179.8	177.1	139.0	119.1	141.6	175.7	146.5	79.7	61.2	1,530.3
Source 1: JMA
Source 2: JMA

=== Demographics ===
Per Japanese census data, the population of Sarufutsu is as shown below:

Historical population
Year	Pop.	±%
1940	5,401	—
1950	7,429	+37.5%
1960	8,319	+12.0%
1970	4,818	−42.1%
1980	3,358	−30.3%
1990	3,206	−4.5%
2000	2,980	−7.0%
2010	2,825	−5.2%
2020	2,611	−7.6%

== History ==
From around the middle of the Edo period, fishing grounds were established under a land contract system managed by Matsumae Domain. The name of "Sarufutsu" derives from the Ainu language word sar-put, which translates "river mouth reed plains", and which referred to a river which flows through the village. In 1878, Sarufutsu Village was established in Sōya District, Kitami Province. In 1909 it was merged with neighboring Soya Village (now part of Wakkanai City), and separated back out as a second-class municipality in October 1924. In 1936, a telephone relay station was established in Sarufutsu, which connected Karafuto with Honshu via a submarine cable. In December 1939, the Soviet prison ship SS Indigirka ran aground at Hamaonishibetsu in Sarufutsu, with the death of 741 prisoners. A cenotaph at Sarufutsu commemorates the tragic event.

In June 1942, construction of the Asajino Airfield of the Imperial Japanese Army Air Force began. Both the first and second airfields were completed at the end of 1944. Many villagers were mobilized for labor service as well as many Korean forced labourers. Approximately 80 Koreans died over the course of construction from abuse or malnutrition. In 2014, the village attempted to construct a monument in memory of the Korean prisoners who died there. However, construction was cancelled after Japanese nationalists orchestrated a protest movement via the internet. The village office was overwhelmed with threatening phone calls, who called the office workers traitors, and threatened the village with a boycott of its scallop industry.

== Government ==
Sarufutsu has a mayor-council form of government with a directly elected mayor and a unicameral village council of eight members. Sarufutsu, as part of Soya sub-prefecture, contributes one member to the Hokkaido Prefectural Assembly. In terms of national politics, the village is part of the Hokkaido 12th district of the lower house of the Diet of Japan.

== Economy ==
The local economy of Sarufutsu is centered on commercial fishing and dairy farming. In particular, Sarufutsu is famous for its scallops, with one of the largest catches in Japan. Sarufutsu scallops were exported even to Hong Kong from the Meiji period. In the immediate post-war era, coal mining and forestry also had a role in the local economy, but when these resources were exhausted, the local government took steps to revive the scallop industry through better resource management and local food processing.. Sarufutsu has a fledgling tourist industry, as it is a highlight for motor bikers in the summer, who stop overnight at one of the biker camps. The tourist center is located a few kilometers south of Hamaonishibetsu.

== Education ==
Sarufutsu has four public elementary schools and one public junior high school operated by the village government. The village does not have a high school.

== Transportation ==
=== Railways ===
Sarufutsu has not had any passenger railway services since the closing of the JR Hokkaido Tempoku Line in 1989. The nearest railway station is Minami-Wakkanai Station or Otoineppu Station on the Sōya Main Line.

=== Highways ===
- National Route 238

== Local attractions ==
- Onishibetsu Sports Center has weekly sports activities for residents and guests.
- Onishibetsu swimming pool is open during the summer into early fall.
- Onishibetsu has a small single-lift ski hill.

== Mascot ==
Saruppu, the village's mascot

Sarufutsu's mascot is Saruppu (さるっぷ). He is a Japanese macaque who moved to Hokkaido. He is a skilled dancer and scallop sculptor. He also likes to travel around the world. His favourite foods are scallops and milk.

== See also ==
- Esanbe Hanakita Kojima (エサンベ鼻北小島) formerly an island, now underwater
