= SS Indigirka =

Steamship serving Soviet Gulag system

History
- Name: 1919 SS Lake Galva; 1920: SS Ripon; 1926: SS Malsah; 1928: SS Commercial Quaker; 1938: SS Indigirka
- Owner: 1920: US Government; 1926: C.D.Mallory & Co; 1928: Moore and McCormick; 1938: Soviet Union
- Operator: 1938: Dalstroi
- Port of registry: 1920: (United States) New York; 1938: Nagaevo, Soviet Union
- Builder: Manitowoc Shipbuilding Company, Wisconsin
- Launched: 20 December 1919
- Completed: May 1920
- Identification: Official Number 219702; Code Letters LVTM (1928–33); Code Letters KUGM (1934–38)
- Fate: Wrecked, 1939

General characteristics
- Type: Cargo ship
- Tonnage: 2,689 GRT
- Length: 77.3 m (253 ft 7 in) (pp)
- Beam: 13.3 m (43 ft 8 in)
- Propulsion: 1 x triple-expansion steam engine
- Speed: 10 knots (19 km/h)
- Capacity: about 1,500 prisoners
- Crew: about 40

SS Indigirka (Russian: «Индиги́рка», IPA: [ɪnʲdʲɪˈɡʲirkə]) was an American-built steamship that served in the Soviet Gulag system and transported prisoners. Launched in 1919 as SS Lake Galva, it served under the names Ripon, Malsah and Commercial Quaker between 1920 and 1938, when it was renamed Indigirka. On its final voyage in 1939 over 700 prisoners perished.

== Pre-Soviet career ==
The ship was built at the Manitowoc Shipbuilding Company in Manitowoc, Wisconsin as one of the Lake series cargo ships. It was launched on 29 December 1919 as Lake Galva and completed in May 1920 as Ripon. It served as an American merchant ship under various owners as SS Ripon (1920–26), SS Malsah (1926–28), and SS Commercial Quaker (1928–38). In 1938 it was sold to the government of the Soviet Union.

== Prison ship of the Dalstroi ==
With some modifications the ship was placed in service by the Dalstroi as the Indigirka (Индиги́рка) – named after the river in Siberia – for the transport of prisoners. With a tonnage of 2,689 and a length 77.3 m it was the smallest ship of the Dalstroi fleet and had a cargo hold of 4,700 m^{3}; Bollinger estimated that it could hold 1,500 captives, while Tzouliades indicates that up to 5,000 prisoners might have been transported. That seems to conflict with evidence that the ship was fully loaded when it departed on its final journey with less than 1,500 crew, passengers and prisoners, forcing Soviet authorities to leave behind many others who were supposed to have made the trip.

The Indigirka belonged to a fleet of steamships operated by Dalstroi to transport prisoners from Vladivostok, endpoint of the Transsiberian railway, to Magadan and Kolyma across the Sea of Okhotsk. Travel time was about six days to two weeks to Magadan. A steamer would make about ten trips a year. Conditions were horrendous and many people did not survive. Prisoners were held in the cargo holds where criminals ruled; the guards stayed outside and above and would spray the holds with ice-cold ocean water if things became too unruly. Female prisoners were abused.

== Final voyage ==
On 8 December 1939 the Indigirka left Magadan to return to Vladivostok under Captain Nikolai Lavrentevich Lapshin. It contained 39 crew, 249 fishermen and their families, 50 prisoners under guard, and 835 prisoners with technical skills who had been released to work for the war effort. On 13 December 1939 at 2:20 am (other reports place the event on 12 December 1939) the ship ran aground in a blizzard off the Japanese coast near Sarufutsu while trying to enter the La Perouse Strait. As the ship turned over, the guards prevented the escape of the prisoners from the holds, and the ship came to rest in shallow water on its side. The Japanese rescued the captain and most of the crew, guards, and fishermen, but it took three days for any rescue of the trapped prisoners to begin. 16 December, when the Japanese rescue team then opened the hull with acetylene torches, only 28 survivors (one of whom later died) were found among more than 700 dead prisoners. Overall 741 people perished. According to Sergey Korolyov's oral statements, he missed the Indigirka convoy and was sent from Kolyma to Vladivostok on the next ship on 23 December.

Captain Lapshin was tried and executed for abandoning the ship; chief of NKVD convoy who locked the prisoners in a sinking ship was sentenced to eight years. A cenotaph at Sarufutsu commemorates the tragic end of the Indigirka.

== See also ==
- SS Dzhurma
