= Sōya Subprefecture =

Coordinates: 45°23′51″N 141°42′03″E

Sōya Subprefecture 宗谷総合振興局
- Sōya-sōgō-shinkō-kyoku
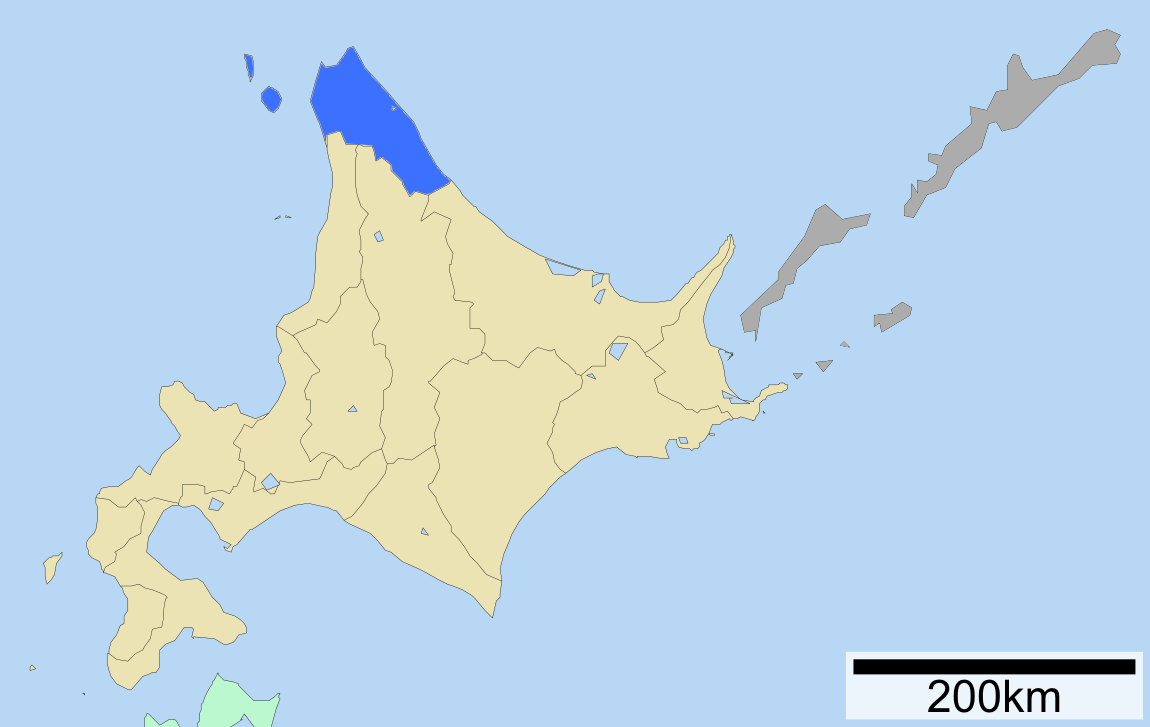
- Prefecture: Hokkaido
- Capital: Wakkanai

Area
  - Total: 4,050.76 km^{2} (1,564.01 sq mi)

Population (March 2009)
  - Total: 75,665
  - Density: 19/km^{2} (48/sq mi)
- Website: souya.pref.hokkaido.lg.jp

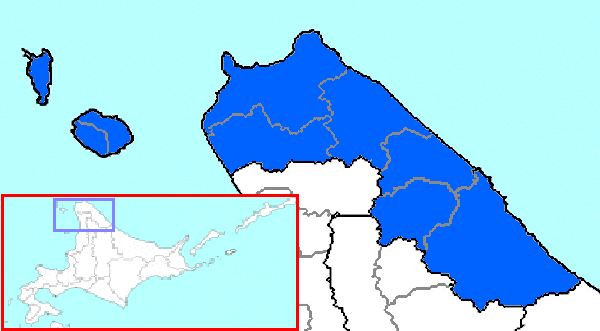
Sōya Subprefecture (without Horonobe)

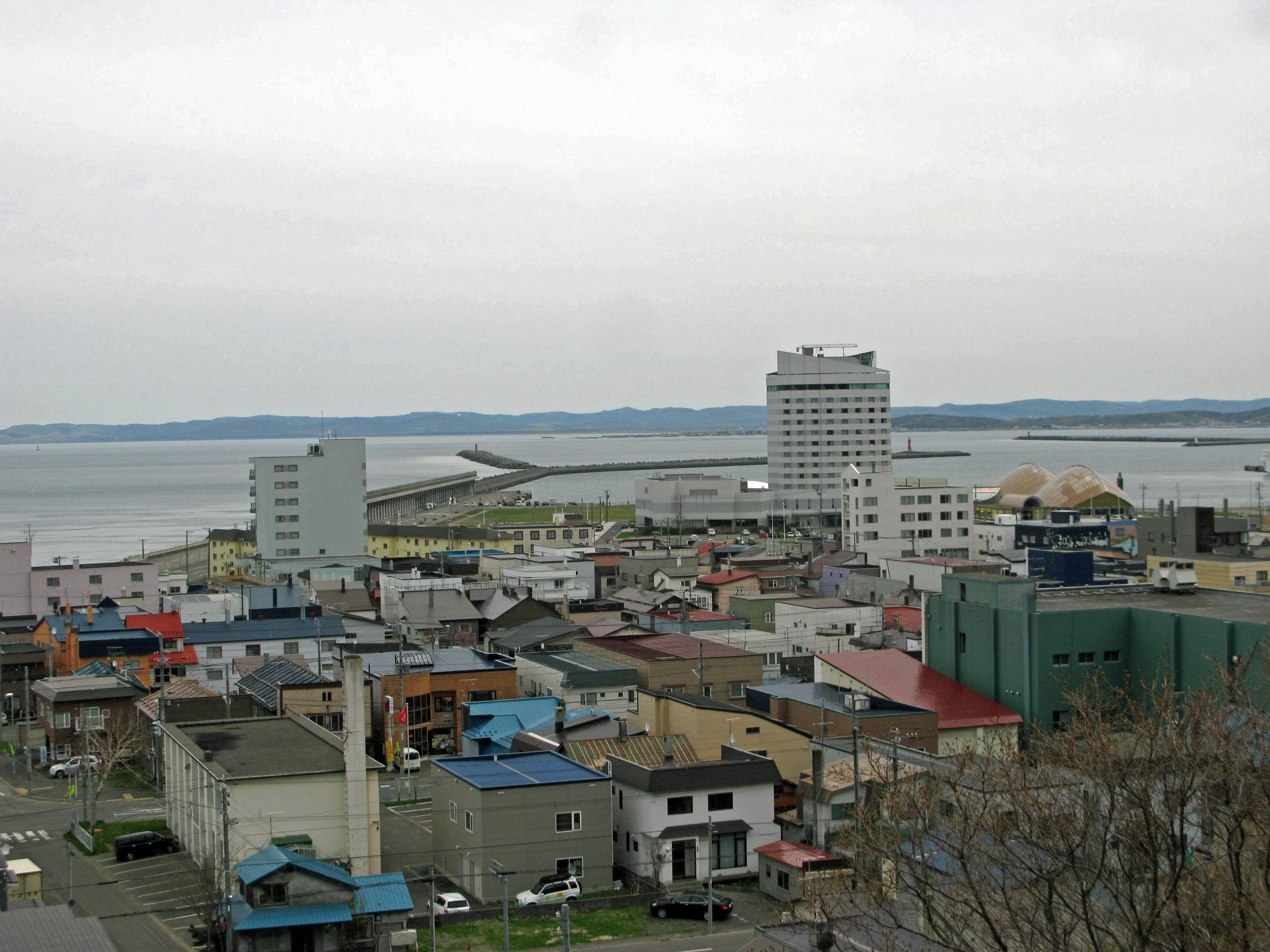
Wakkanai City

Sōya Subprefecture (宗谷総合振興局, Sōya-sōgō-shinkō-kyoku) is a subprefecture of Hokkaido Prefecture, Japan. Its population is estimated to be 77,500 as of July 31, 2004 and its area is 4,050.84 square kilometres (1,564.04 sq mi). It is the northernmost subprefecture of Japan.

Wakkanai Airport is located in Wakkanai. Rishiri Airport is located in Rishirifuji, Rishiri District.

== Geography ==
=== Municipalities ===
Name		Area (km^{2})	Population	Population Density	District	Type	Map
Rōmaji	Kanji	Area (km^{2})	Population	Population Density	District	Type	Map
Esashi	枝幸町	1,115.67	8,578	7.69	Esashi District	Town	
Hamatonbetsu	浜頓別町	401.56	3,841	9.56	Esashi District	Town	
Horonobe	幌延町	574.27	2,415	4.21	Teshio District	Town	
Nakatonbetsu	中頓別町	398.55	1,776	4.46	Esashi District	Town	
Rebun	礼文町	81.33	2,651	32.60	Rebun District	Town	
Rishiri	利尻町	76.49	2,169	28.36	Rishiri District	Town	
Rishirifuji	利尻富士町	105.69	2,665	25.22	Rishiri District	Town	
Sarufutsu	猿払村	590	2,884	4.89	Sōya District	Village	
Toyotomi	豊富町	520.69	4,054	7.79	Teshio District	Town	
Wakkanai (capital)	稚内市	761.47	33,869	44.48	no district	City	

== History ==
- 1897: Sōya Subprefecture established; Sōya, Esashi, Rishiri, Rebun Districts placed under its jurisdiction
- 1948: Toyotomi village (now town), Teshio District transferred from Rumoi Subprefecture
- 2010: Horonobe town, Teshio District transferred from Rumoi Subprefecture
