= Rishiri, Hokkaido =

Rishiri 利尻町
- Town
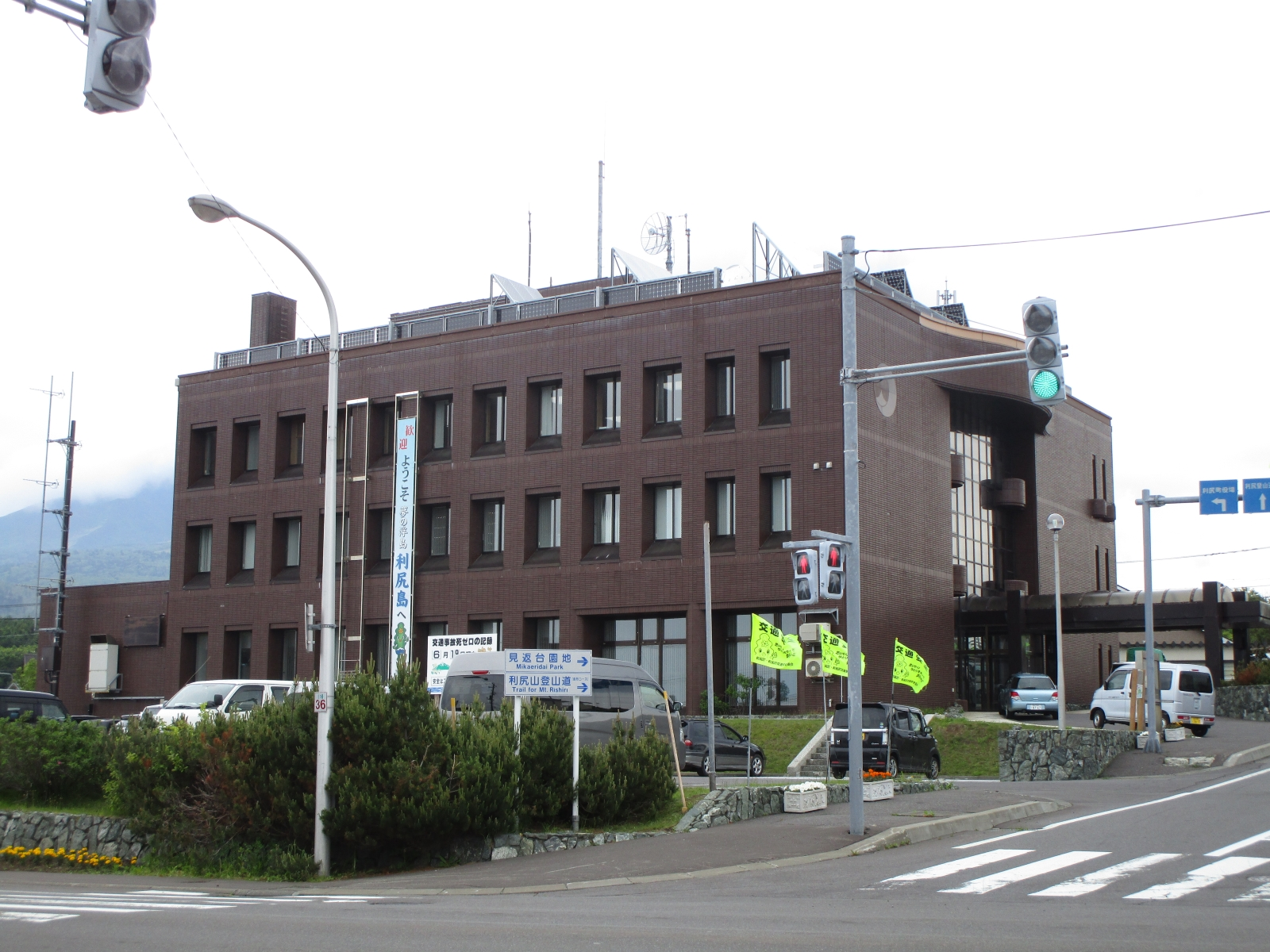
- Rishiri Town Hall

- Flag Seal

- Location of Rishiri in Hokkaido (Sōya Subprefecture)

- Location in Japan
- Coordinates: 45°11′N 141°8′E
- Country: Japan
- Region: Hokkaido
- Prefecture: Hokkaido (Sōya Subprefecture)
- District: Rishiri

Government
  - Mayor: Jun'itsu Tajima

Area
  - Total: 76.49 km^{2} (29.53 sq mi)

Population (30 September 2016)
  - Total: 2,169
  - Density: 28.36/km^{2} (73.44/sq mi)
- Time zone: UTC+09:00 (JST)
- City hall address: 14-1 Kutsugata Midorichō, Rishiri-chō, Rishiri-gun, Hokkaidō; 097-0401
- Climate: Dfb
- Website: www.town.rishiri.hokkaido.jp
- Symbols
- Bird: Rishiri komadori (Erithacus akahige rishiriensis)
- Flower: Ezokanzō (Hemerocallis dumortieri var. esculenta) and chishimazakura (Prunus nipponica var. kurilensis)
- Tree: Siberian dwarf pine (Pinus pumila)

Rishiri (利尻町, Rishiri-chō) is a town located on Rishiri Island in Sōya Subprefecture, Hokkaido, Japan.

As of September 2016, the town has an estimated population of 2,169 and a density of 28 persons per km^{2}. The total area is 76.49 km^{2}.

Rishiri Airport is located in nearby Rishirifuji.

The town's name originates from the ainu phrase "ri-sir", meaning "tall island" or "island with tall mountain", describing the island's 1721m tall Mount Rishiri

== Geography ==
Rishiri is located on the western portion of Rishiri Island, facing the Sea of Japan. Mount Rishiri (also known as Rishirifuji), at 1721m, is located on the border with Rishirifuji.

=== Neighbouring municipalities ===
- Sōya Subprefecture, Hokkaido
- Rishirifuji

=== Climate ===
Climate data for Port Kutsugata, Rishiri, elevation 14 m (46 ft), (1991–2020 normals, extremes 1976–present)
| Month | Jan | Feb | Mar | Apr | May | Jun | Jul | Aug | Sep | Oct | Nov | Dec | Year |
|---|---|---|---|---|---|---|---|---|---|---|---|---|---|
| Record high °C (°F) | 7.3 (45.1) | 7.4 (45.3) | 12.4 (54.3) | 19.3 (66.7) | 23.8 (74.8) | 28.6 (83.5) | 31.9 (89.4) | 32.5 (90.5) | 30.4 (86.7) | 21.8 (71.2) | 16.7 (62.1) | 12.1 (53.8) | 32.5 (90.5) |
| Mean daily maximum °C (°F) | −1.8 (28.8) | −1.4 (29.5) | 2.1 (35.8) | 7.6 (45.7) | 13.2 (55.8) | 17.3 (63.1) | 21.4 (70.5) | 23.1 (73.6) | 20.6 (69.1) | 14.4 (57.9) | 6.7 (44.1) | 0.5 (32.9) | 10.3 (50.6) |
| Daily mean °C (°F) | −4 (25) | −3.8 (25.2) | −0.3 (31.5) | 4.6 (40.3) | 9.6 (49.3) | 13.7 (56.7) | 18.0 (64.4) | 19.9 (67.8) | 17.3 (63.1) | 11.5 (52.7) | 4.0 (39.2) | −1.8 (28.8) | 7.4 (45.3) |
| Mean daily minimum °C (°F) | −6.4 (20.5) | −6.5 (20.3) | −3.2 (26.2) | 1.4 (34.5) | 6.1 (43.0) | 10.4 (50.7) | 14.9 (58.8) | 16.6 (61.9) | 13.5 (56.3) | 8.0 (46.4) | 1.2 (34.2) | −4.2 (24.4) | 4.3 (39.8) |
| Record low °C (°F) | −15.7 (3.7) | −16.9 (1.6) | −14.4 (6.1) | −6.4 (20.5) | −1.8 (28.8) | 1.3 (34.3) | 5.5 (41.9) | 8.8 (47.8) | 5.4 (41.7) | −0.7 (30.7) | −10.5 (13.1) | −12.3 (9.9) | −16.9 (1.6) |
| Average precipitation mm (inches) | 46.4 (1.83) | 33.3 (1.31) | 34.8 (1.37) | 41.2 (1.62) | 68.4 (2.69) | 62.1 (2.44) | 93.8 (3.69) | 118.2 (4.65) | 117.9 (4.64) | 117.5 (4.63) | 106.5 (4.19) | 72.6 (2.86) | 912.7 (35.92) |
| Average precipitation days (≥ 1.0 mm) | 13.9 | 11.2 | 9.0 | 8.5 | 9.3 | 8.6 | 8.6 | 9.1 | 11.0 | 13.3 | 13.0 | 13.8 | 129.3 |
| Mean monthly sunshine hours | 42.5 | 74.3 | 133.1 | 173.0 | 184.3 | 153.4 | 152.5 | 162.0 | 175.1 | 137.7 | 65.8 | 37.8 | 1,492.5 |
Source 1: JMA
Source 2: JMA

== Demographics ==
Per Japanese census data, the population of Rishiri has declined in recent decades.

Historical population
| Year | Pop. | ±% |
|---|---|---|
| 2000 | 3,417 | — |
| 2010 | 2,590 | −24.2% |
| 2020 | 2,004 | −22.6% |

== Education ==
- Primary schools
  - Kutsugata Elementary School
  - Senhōshi Elementary School
  - Shinminato Elementary School
- Junior high schools
  - Kutsugata Junior High School
  - Senhōshi Junior High School
- High schools
  - Rishiri High School

== Mascot ==
Rishirin, the town's mascot

Rishiri's mascot is Rishirin (りしりん), who is a bright and energetic kelp with a Mount Rishiri motif. She helps Lip-kun and Lip-chan (the mascots of Rishirifuji) and Atsumon (the mascot of Rebun) research the nature of Rishiri-Rebun-Sarobetsu National Park. Her favorite foods are sea urchins and kelp. She was unveiled in 2011.
