= Rishiri Airport =

Airport in Rishirifuji, Hokkaido, Japan

Rishiri Airport 利尻空港
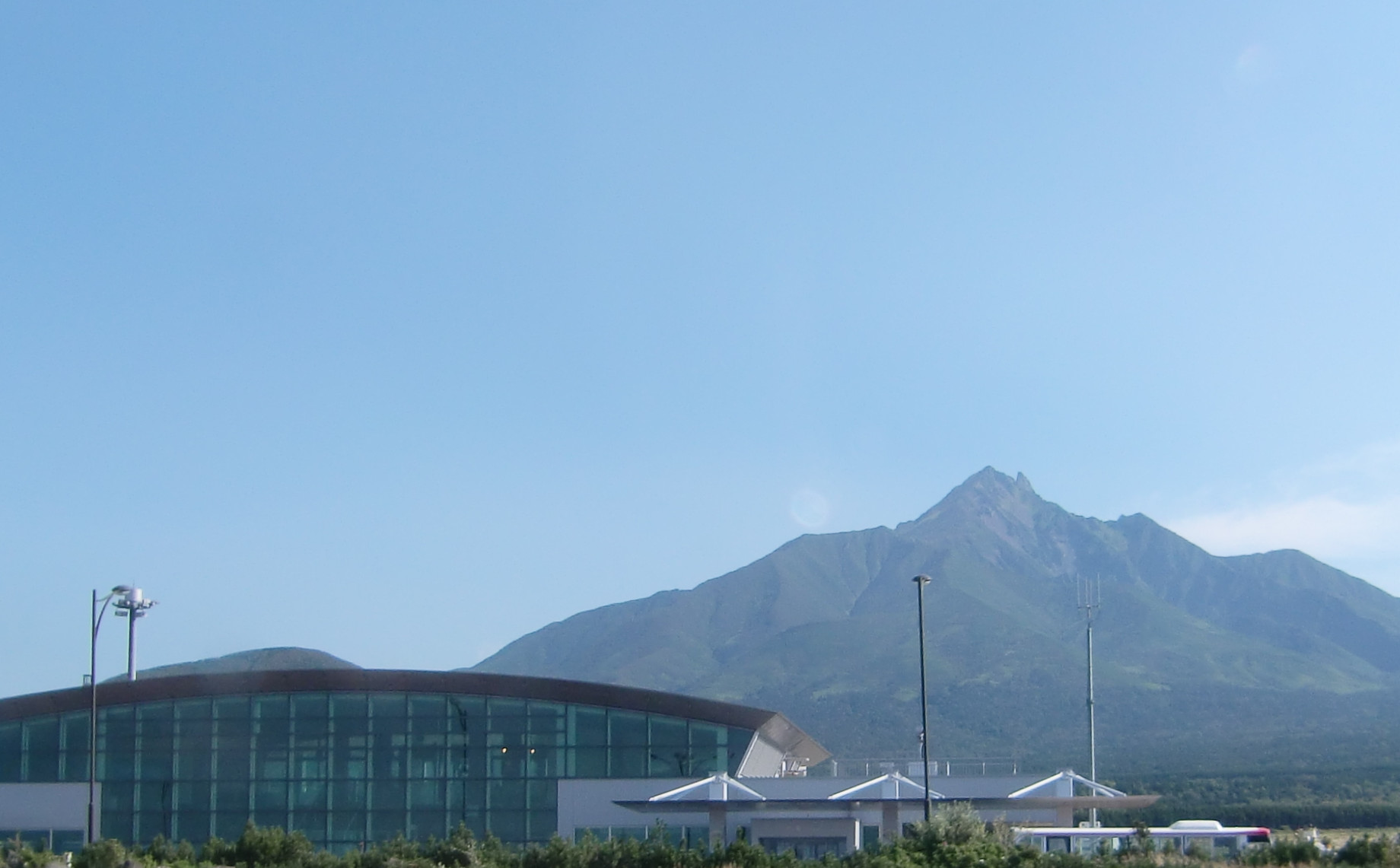
- IATA: RIS; ICAO: RJER

Summary
- Airport type: Public
- Operator: Hokkaidō Prefecture
- Serves: Rishiri
- Location: Rishirifuji, Japan
- Elevation AMSL: 99 ft (30 m)
- Coordinates: 45°14′31″N 141°11′15″E

Map
- Location in Japan RJER (Japan)

Runways
Direction	Length		Surface
Direction	m	ft	Surface
07/25	1,800	5,906	Asphalt concrete

Statistics (2024)
- Passengers: 61,333
- Cargo (metric tonnes): 3
- Aircraft movement: 1,026
- Source: Japanese Ministry of Land, Infrastructure, Transport and Tourism

Rishiri Airport (利尻空港, Rishiri kūkō) (IATA: RIS, ICAO: RJER) is an airport in Rishirifuji, Hokkaidō, Japan, near the town of Rishiri on Rishiri Island.

== History ==
Rishiri Airport opened in 1962 with a 600-meter runway, the airport underwent significant development over the years. In 1974, the runway was extended to 800 meters, enabling Nihon Kinkyori Airways (later Air Nippon, which merged into All Nippon Airways) to begin year-round service to Wakkanai Airport. By 1994, flight operations to Wakkanai were transferred to Air Hokkaido. In 1999, with the construction of a new 1,800-meter runway designed for larger jet aircraft, Air Nippon began seasonal summer flights to New Chitose Airport in Sapporo.

In 2003, flights to Wakkanai were discontinued, and flights to New Chitose became year-round services. However, in 2011, Hokkaido Air System opened flights to Sapporo Okadama Airport, leading to a shift in operations. As a result, flights to New Chitose Airport were reduced to a seasonal service, operating only during the summer months.

In current operations, the airport sees a year-round connection to Okadama Airport, operated by Hokkaido Air System ATR 42-600 turboprop aircraft. But also a seasonal connection to New Chitose Airport, operated by ANA Wings with Bombardier Q400 aircraft.

== Airlines and destinations ==
Airlines	Destinations
ANA Wings	Seasonal: Sapporo–Chitose
Hokkaido Air System	Sapporo–Okadama
