= Rishiri Island =

Volcanic island in the Sea of Japan

Coordinates: 45°11′N 141°15′E

Rishiri
Native name: 利尻島 Rishiri-tō
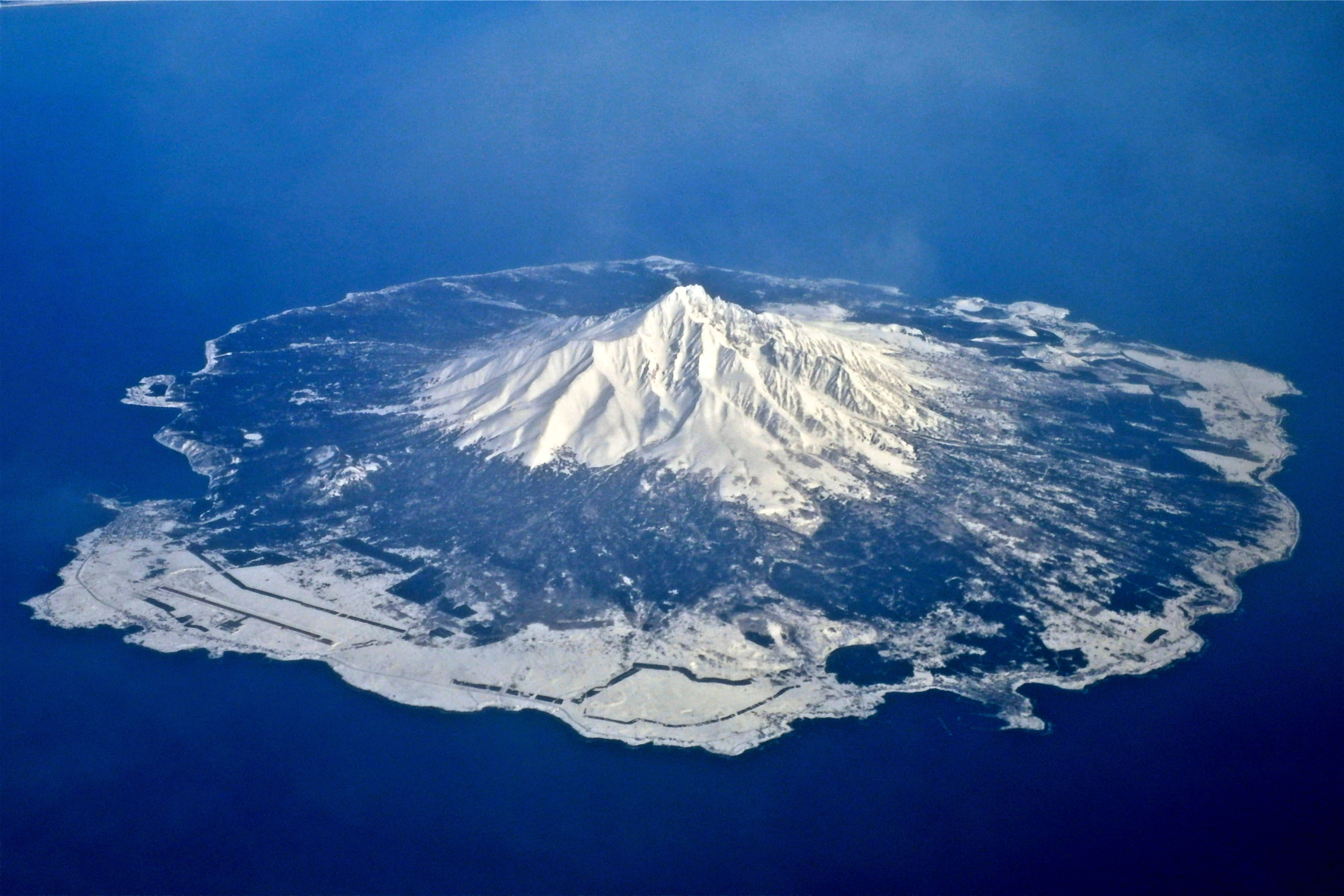

- Location within Japan

Geography
- Archipelago: Japanese archipelago
- Area: 183 km^{2} (71 sq mi)
- Length: 19 km (11.8 mi)
- Width: 14 km (8.7 mi)
- Coastline: 63 km (39.1 mi)
- Highest elevation: 1,721 m (5646 ft)
- Highest point: Mount Rishiri

Administration
- Japan
- Prefecture: Hokkaido
- Subprefecture: Sōya Subprefecture
- District: Rishiri District
- Town: Rishiri; Rishirifuji

Demographics
- Population: 5,102 (2013)
- Pop. density: 30.81/km^{2} (79.8/sq mi)
- Ethnic groups: Ainu, Japanese

Rishiri Island (利尻島, Rishiri-tō) is a volcanic island in the Sea of Japan off the coast of Hokkaido, Japan. Administratively the island is part of Hokkaido Prefecture, and is divided between two towns, Rishiri and Rishirifuji. The island is formed by the cone-shaped extinct volcanic peak of Mount Rishiri. Along with Rebun Island and the coastal area of the Sarobetsu Plain, Rishiri forms the Rishiri-Rebun-Sarobetsu National Park. The main industries of Rishiri are tourism and fishing. The island has a population of 5,102 residents.

== Etymology ==
Rishiri derives its name from the Ainu language, and means "high island", or "island with a high peak", a reference to the altitude of Mount Rishiri above sea level.

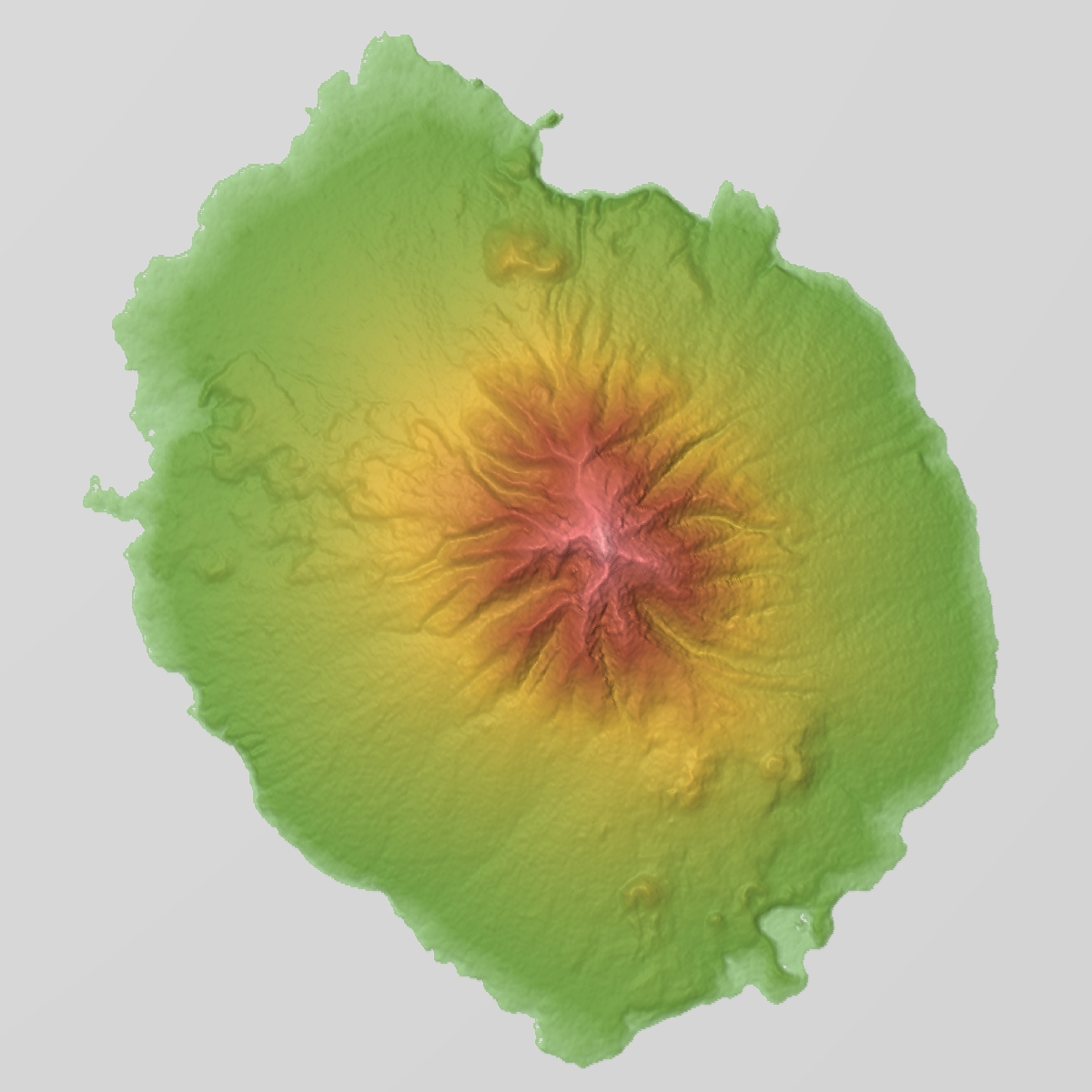
Relief Map

== Geography ==
Rishiri Island is located roughly 20 kilometres (12 mi) west of Hokkaido; Rebun Island is a further 10 kilometres (6.2 mi) to the northwest. Rishiri is roughly circular with a coastline of 63 kilometres (39 mi). The island spans 19 kilometres (12 mi) from north to south and 14 kilometres (8.7 mi) from east to west. Mount Rishiri rises to an altitude of 1,721 metres (5,646 ft) and provides a good source of fresh water; numerous small ponds and springs are located at the foot of the mountain. The residents of Rishiri live in coastal communities, which are connected by a bus service that circumnavigates the island.

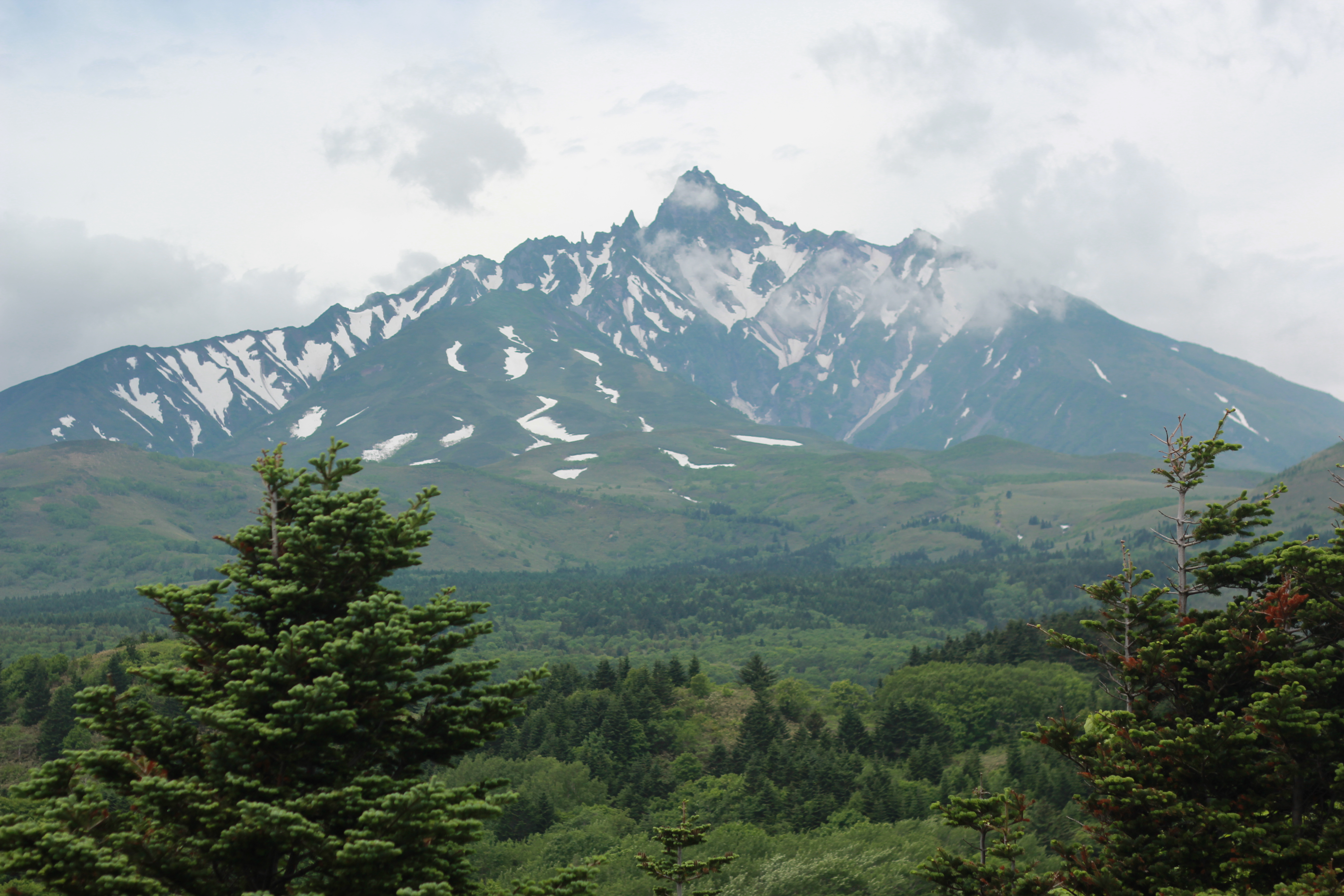
Mount Rishiri

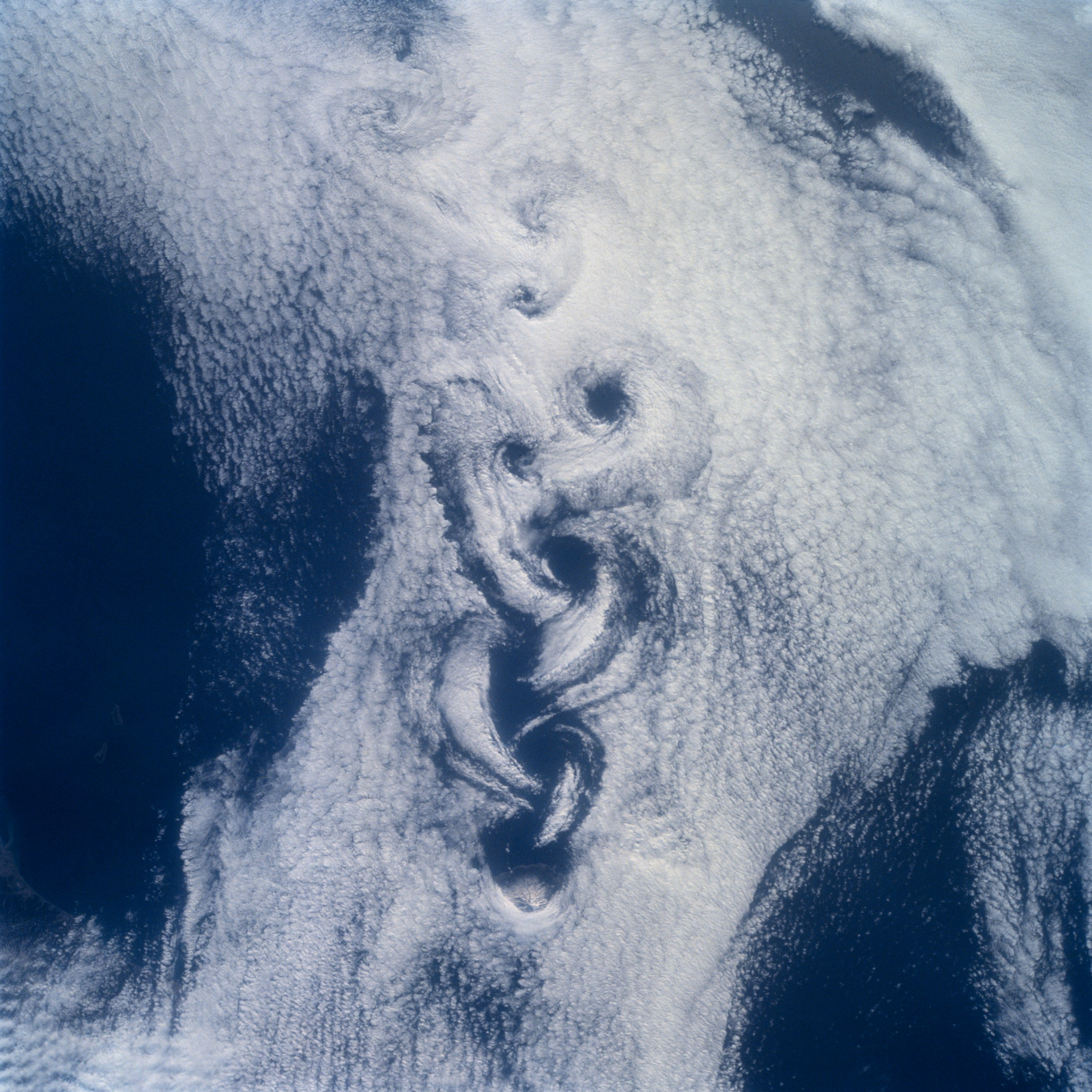
Von Karman vortices being formed by the peak of Mount Rishiri (lower center) in April 2001.

=== Important Bird Area ===
The island has been recognised as an Important Bird Area (IBA) by BirdLife International because it supports populations of black-tailed gulls and Japanese robins.

=== Climate ===
Climate data for Port Kutsugata, Rishiri, elevation 14 m (46 ft), (1991–2020 normals, extremes 1976–present)
Month	Jan	Feb	Mar	Apr	May	Jun	Jul	Aug	Sep	Oct	Nov	Dec	Year
Record high °C (°F)	7.3 (45.1)	7.4 (45.3)	12.4 (54.3)	19.3 (66.7)	23.8 (74.8)	28.6 (83.5)	31.9 (89.4)	32.5 (90.5)	30.4 (86.7)	21.8 (71.2)	16.7 (62.1)	12.1 (53.8)	32.5 (90.5)
Mean daily maximum °C (°F)	−1.8 (28.8)	−1.4 (29.5)	2.1 (35.8)	7.6 (45.7)	13.2 (55.8)	17.3 (63.1)	21.4 (70.5)	23.1 (73.6)	20.6 (69.1)	14.4 (57.9)	6.7 (44.1)	0.5 (32.9)	10.3 (50.6)
Daily mean °C (°F)	−4 (25)	−3.8 (25.2)	−0.3 (31.5)	4.6 (40.3)	9.6 (49.3)	13.7 (56.7)	18.0 (64.4)	19.9 (67.8)	17.3 (63.1)	11.5 (52.7)	4.0 (39.2)	−1.8 (28.8)	7.4 (45.3)
Mean daily minimum °C (°F)	−6.4 (20.5)	−6.5 (20.3)	−3.2 (26.2)	1.4 (34.5)	6.1 (43.0)	10.4 (50.7)	14.9 (58.8)	16.6 (61.9)	13.5 (56.3)	8.0 (46.4)	1.2 (34.2)	−4.2 (24.4)	4.3 (39.8)
Record low °C (°F)	−15.7 (3.7)	−16.9 (1.6)	−14.4 (6.1)	−6.4 (20.5)	−1.8 (28.8)	1.3 (34.3)	5.5 (41.9)	8.8 (47.8)	5.4 (41.7)	−0.7 (30.7)	−10.5 (13.1)	−12.3 (9.9)	−16.9 (1.6)
Average precipitation mm (inches)	46.4 (1.83)	33.3 (1.31)	34.8 (1.37)	41.2 (1.62)	68.4 (2.69)	62.1 (2.44)	93.8 (3.69)	118.2 (4.65)	117.9 (4.64)	117.5 (4.63)	106.5 (4.19)	72.6 (2.86)	912.7 (35.92)
Average precipitation days (≥ 1.0 mm)	13.9	11.2	9.0	8.5	9.3	8.6	8.6	9.1	11.0	13.3	13.0	13.8	129.3
Mean monthly sunshine hours	42.5	74.3	133.1	173.0	184.3	153.4	152.5	162.0	175.1	137.7	65.8	37.8	1,492.5
Source 1: JMA
Source 2: JMA

== Communities ==
The island is divided between two towns, Rishiri (population 2,304), on the south-west half of island and Rishirifuji (population 2,798) on the north-east half of island, both of which belong to Rishiri District, Sōya Subprefecture.

These towns include the following communities, listed from the north side of the island, clockwise around:

- Oshidomari (ferry port)
- Himenuma
- Oniwaki
- Numaura
- Misaki, Rishiri
- Senposhi
- Kusure
- Randomari
- Kutsugata (ferry port)
- Shinminato, Rishiri
- Motodomari

== Transportation ==
- Ferry service to Rebun, Wakkanai, and Otaru
- Air link to Wakkanai and Sapporo Okadama Airport

A bus runs the circuit route around the island.

Rishiri Airport is located in Rishirifuji.

== History ==
- 1807-1808 Failed military expedition to Sakhalin, part of deceased buried at Cape Peshi.
- Ranald MacDonald (1824-1894), first native English teacher in Japan, landed on Rishiri in 1848.
- On November 10, 1948, Vladimir Barashkov, a Soviet pilot, defected by flying a Lisunov Li-2 from a Far Eastern airfield to Rishiri.
- On February 7, 2013, Russian Sukhoi Su-27 fighter jets had been spotted above Japanese waters off Rishiri Island, and were pursued by four Mitsubishi F-2s.

== Economy ==
The economy of Rishiri Island formerly depended on the fishing of Pacific herring, but the herring stock is now mostly depleted. Rishiri Island is now noted for its production of dried kombu.

== Noted features ==
- Pon-yama (444 metres (1,457 ft)) - a mountain top near north coast, nearby a site of non-coastal hiking camp on island

Other features of Rishiri Island include:

- Cape Peshi on the East side of the port Oshidomari
- Cape Senhoshi
  - Neguma (Sleeping Bear) Rock
- Jimmen Rock
- Ponmoshiri Island
- Hime Marsh
- Menūshoro Marsh
- Otatomari Marsh

== See also ==
- List of islands of Japan
