= Mount Rishiri =

Quaternary stratovolcano off the cost of Hokkaido, Japan

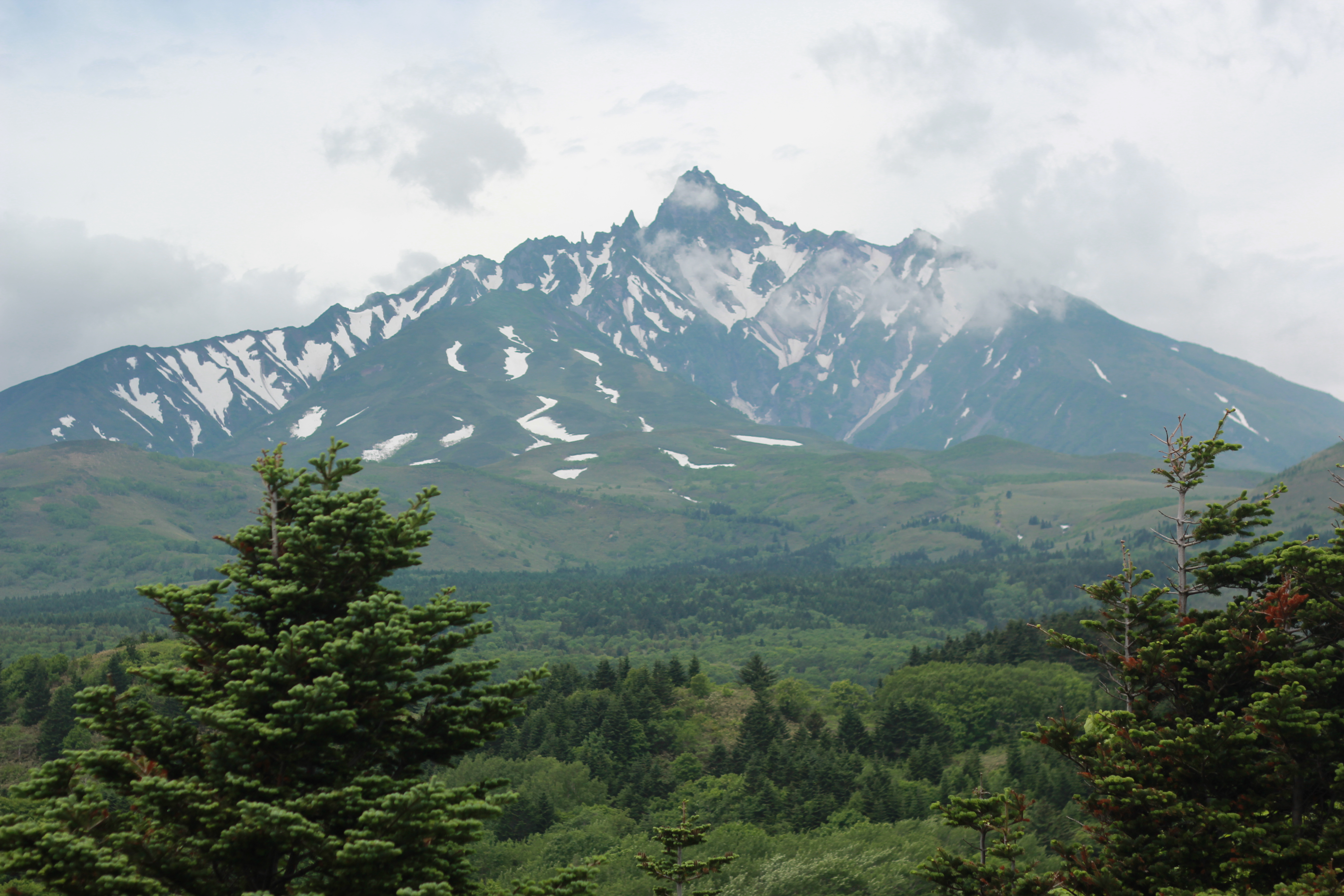
- Mount Rishiri seen from the Otadomari-numa viewpoint

Highest point
- Elevation: 1,721 m (5,646 ft)
- Prominence: 1,721 m (5,646 ft)
- Listing: Ultra, Ribu; List of mountains and hills of Japan by height List of the 100 famous mountains in Japan; List of volcanoes in Japan
- Coordinates: 45°10′48″N 141°14′21″E

Naming
- Native name: 利尻山 (Japanese)

Geography
- Location within Japan
- Location: Hokkaidō, Japan
- Parent range: Rishiri Island
- Topo map(s): Geographical Survey Institute 25000:1 鴛泊; 25000:1 雄忠志内; 50000:1

Geology
- Rock age: Late Pleistocene
- Mountain type: Stratovolcano
- Volcanic arc: Sakhalin Island Arc
- Last eruption: 5830 BC ± 300 years

Climbing
- Easiest route: Hike

Mount Rishiri (利尻山, Rishiri-zan) is a Quaternary stratovolcano located off the coast of Hokkaidō, Japan in the Sea of Japan. It rises out of the Sea of Japan forming Rishiri Island. Because its cone shape resembles Mount Fuji it is sometimes referred to as Rishiri Fuji. It is one of the 100 famous mountains in Japan.

Mount Rishiri's opening festival is held annually on July 2 and July 3. This festival officially opens the climbing season.

== Geology ==
Mount Rishiri is made up of alkali and non-alkali mafic volcanic rock dating from the Late Pleistocene, 130,000–18,000 years ago. Otherwise it is covered in Quaternary volcanic rock debris.

== Climbing route ==
The ascent of Rishiri is challenging in places and not suitable for novice hikers. There is a campsite partway up the mountain from the dock, and an unmanned hut located a short distance below the summit. There is also a small shrine at the summit. On clear days the view extends to Hokkaidō, the adjacent island of Rebun, and as far as Sakhalin Island in Russia.

== In popular culture ==
The package of Shiroi Koibito cookies includes a picture of Mount Rishiri arranged in the centre.

== Gallery ==
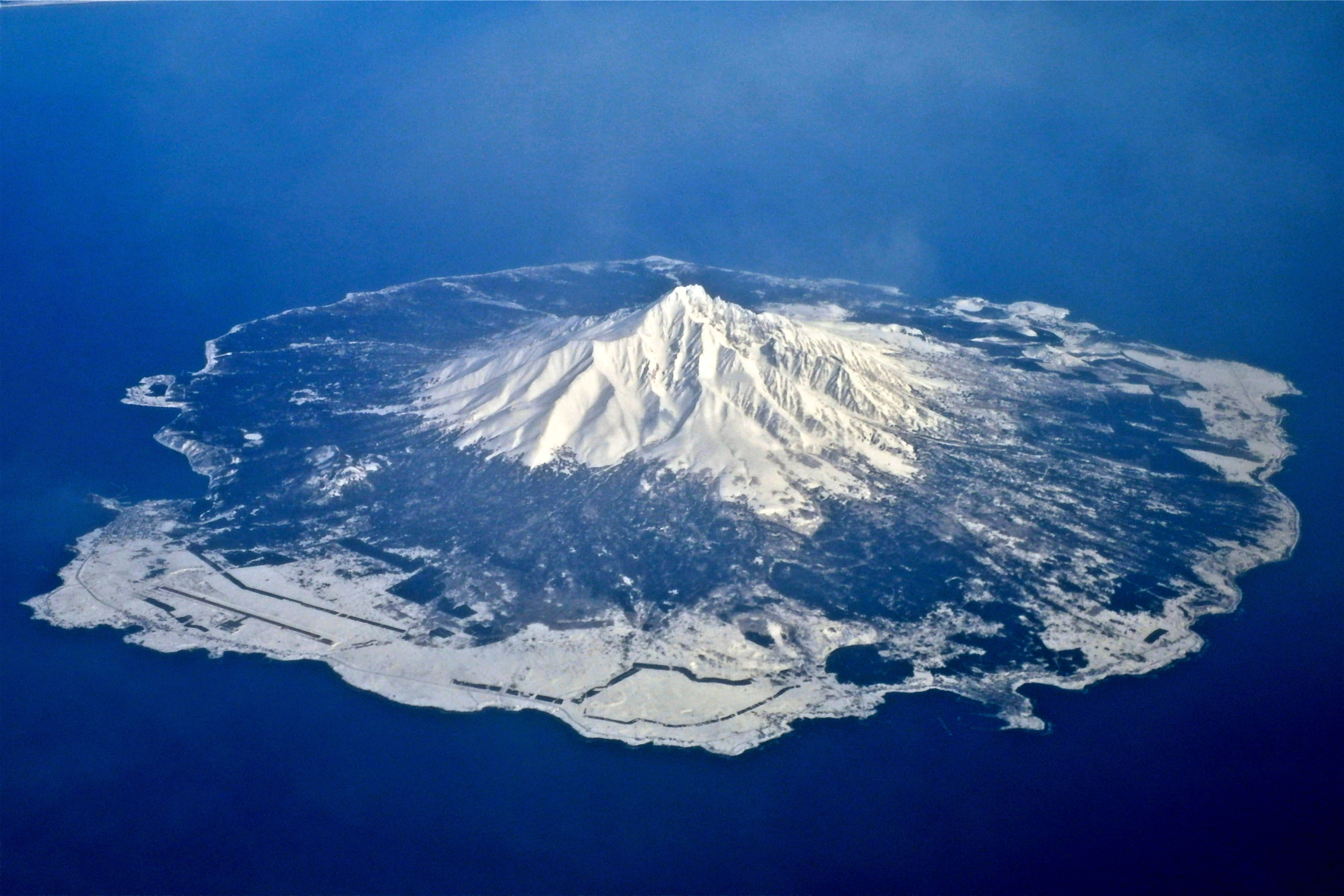
Rishiri Island

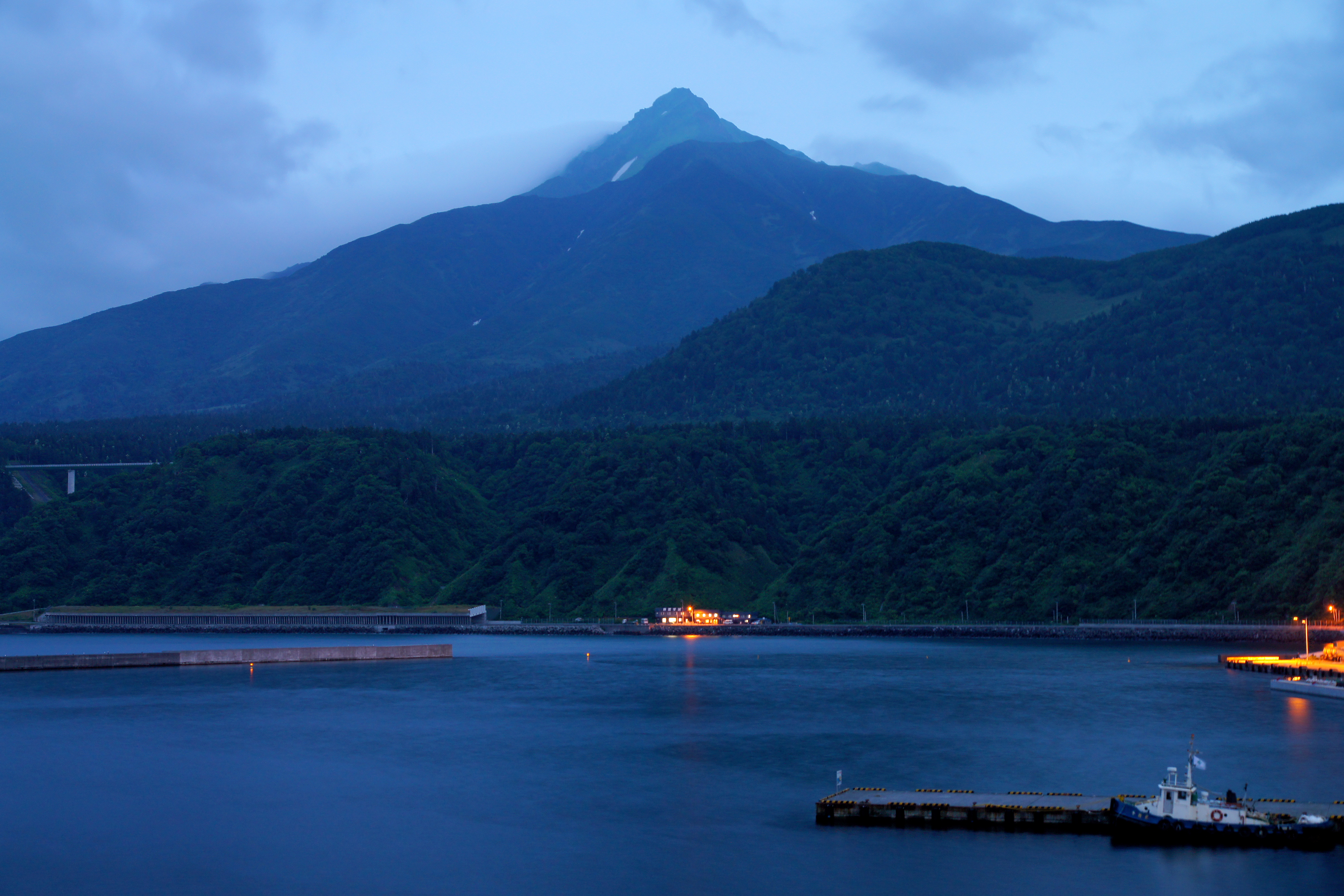
Mount Rishiri view from Oshidomari Port

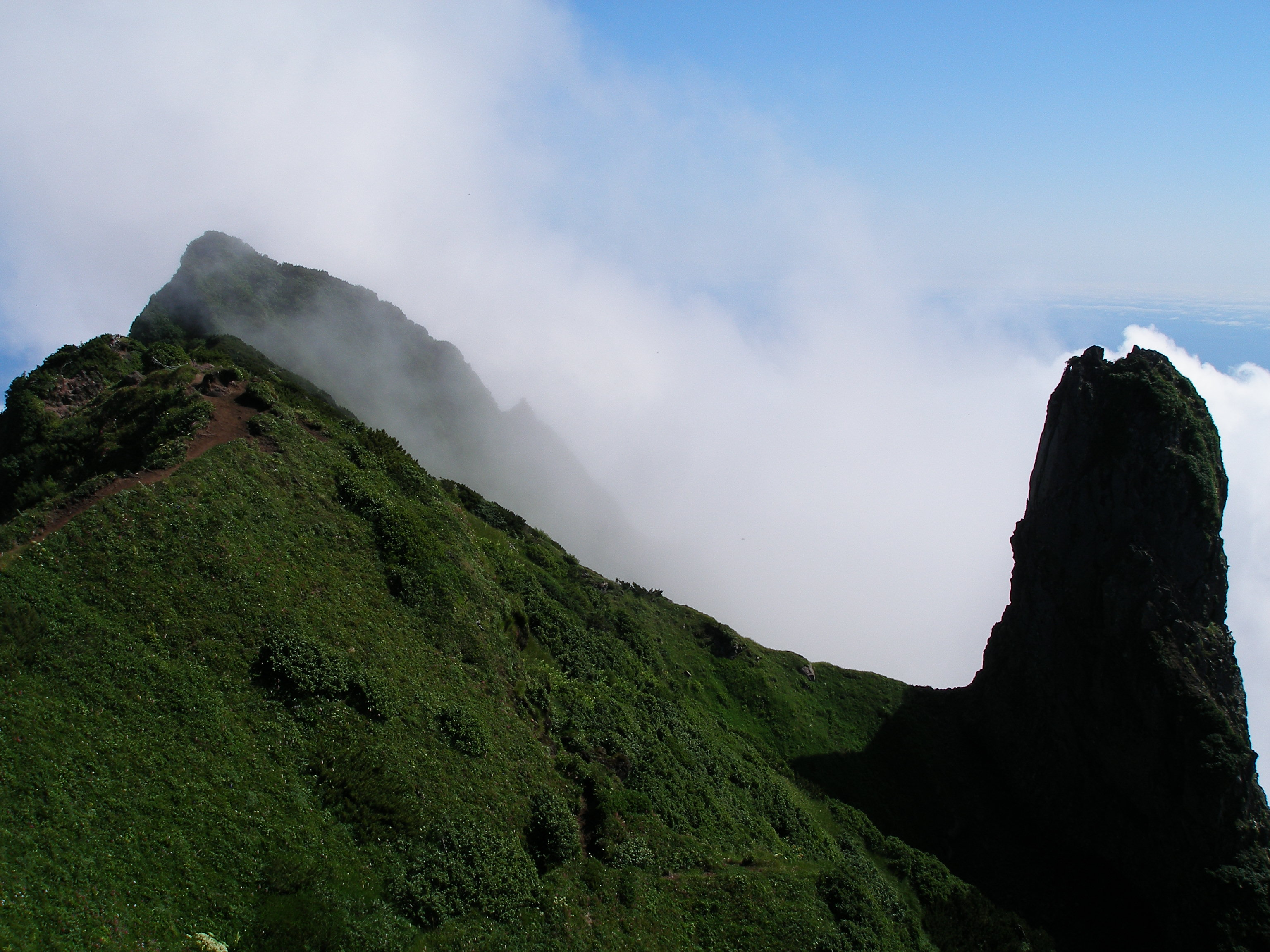
The summit of Mt. Rishiri taken from just below
