= Lake Ōnuma (Wakkanai) =

Lake in Wakkanai, Hokkaidō, Japan

- 大沼 (Japanese)
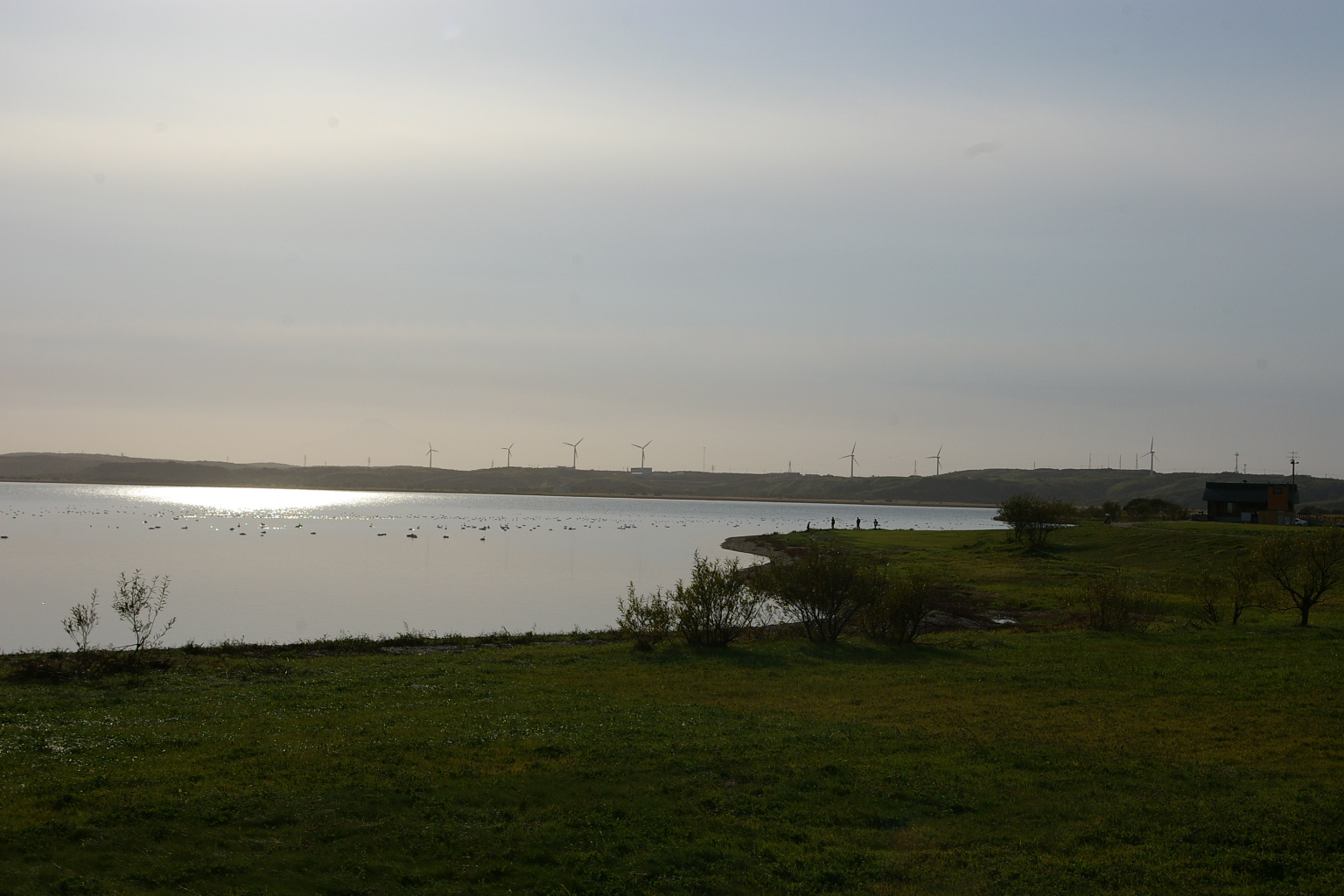
- Ōnuma with Sōya Misaki Wind Farm behind

- Location within Hokkaido Location within Japan
- Location: Wakkanai, Hokkaidō
- Coordinates: 45.38045°N 141.75939°E
- Primary outflows: Koetoi River
- Surface area: 4.67 km^{2} (1.80 sq mi) (2018)

Ōnuma (大沼) is a low-lying lake in Wakkanai, Hokkaidō, Japan. Its surface area of 4.67 km^{2} (1.80 sq mi) makes it, by this metric, the twentieth largest on the island. It is located a short distance inland from Sōya Bay, with which it is connected by the lower reaches of the Koetoi River, and is six kilometers east of the urban center of Wakkanai. It is also known as Shupunto Swamp from its Ainu name meaning "swamp belly"

== Birdlife ==
Ōnuma provides a resting point in the autumn for Whooper swans, mute swans, white-fronted geese, and grey heron from Siberia on their way to their winter grounds, and again in spring upon their return. On the north shore is the Wakkanai City Onuma Bird Observation Center (Onuma Birdhouse), allows visitors to see wild birds from the observation room.

== History ==
From 1943 to 1945, the Wakkanai detachment of the Imperial Japanese Navy's Ōminato Naval Air Group was based on the north side of Ōnuma (near the current Ōnuma Birdhouse) and patrolled the Sōya Strait with Zero-type floatplanes. On October 11, 1943, the Wakkanai detachment's floatplanes attacked the submarine USS Wahoo (SS-238), which was attempting to break through the Sōya Strait, with depth charges and guided it to surface ships, contributing to its sinking.

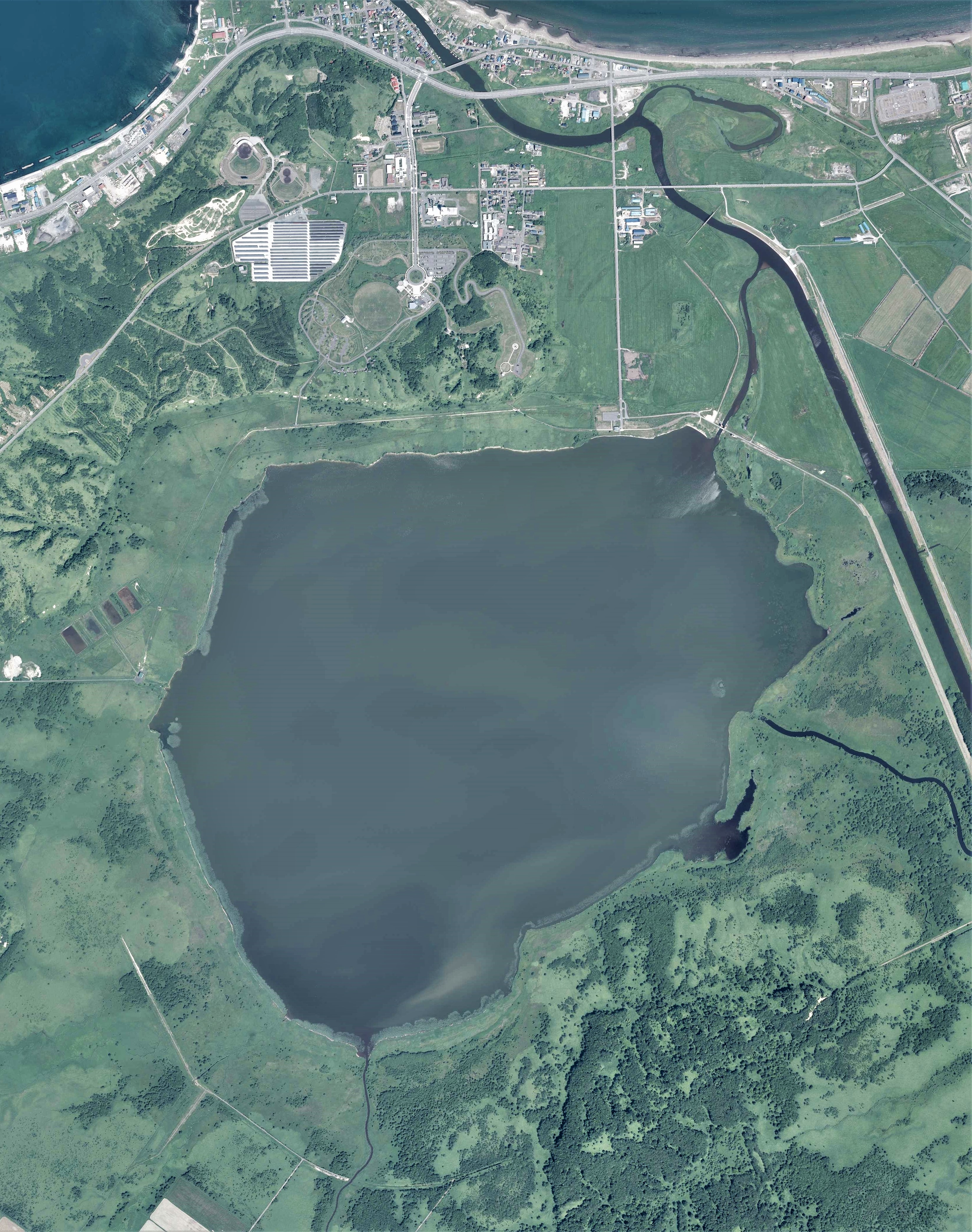
Lake Onuma

== See also ==
- Cape Sōya
- Koetoi River
- Wakkanai Park
