= Wakkanai Lighthouse =

Wakkanai Lighthouse 稚内灯台
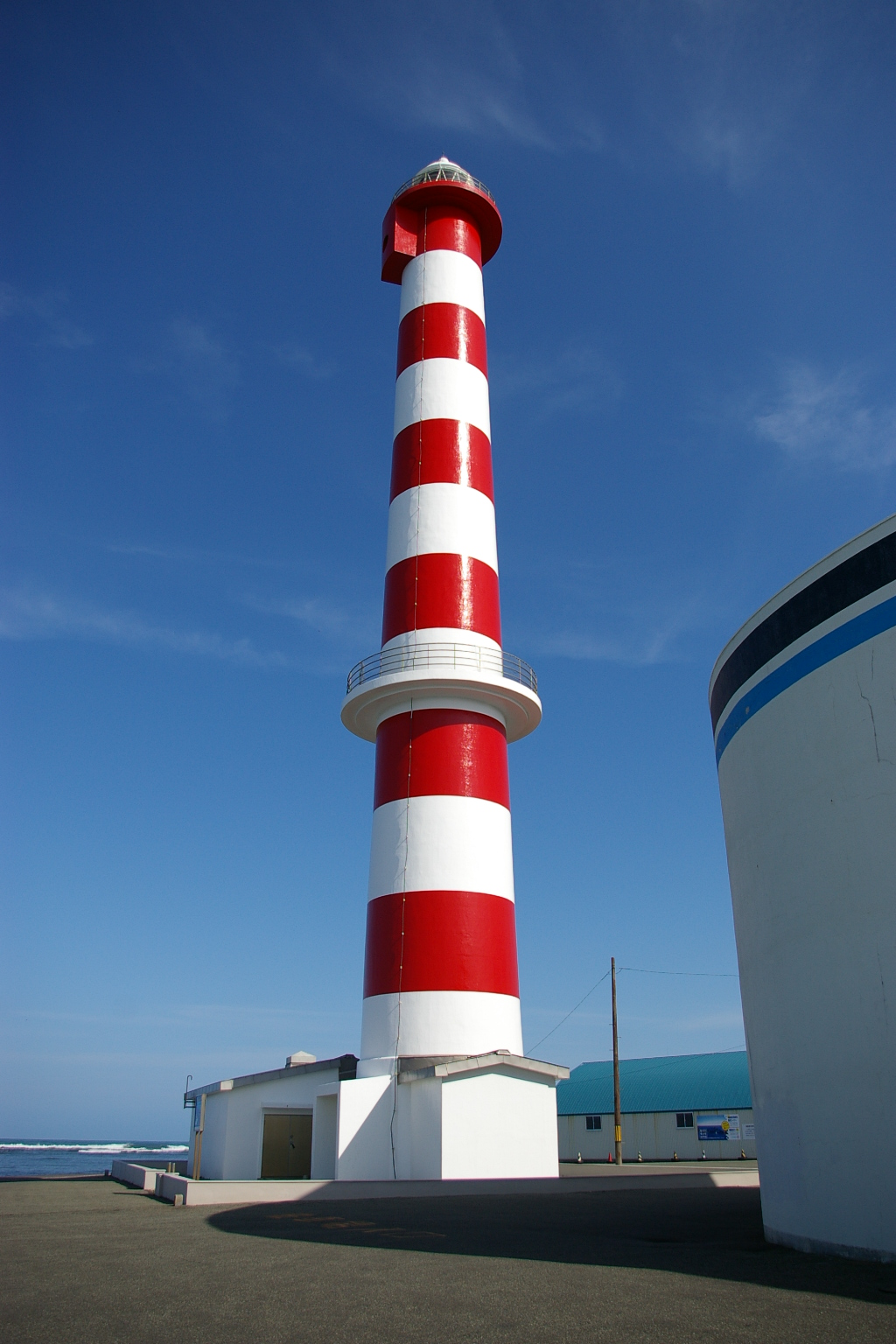
- Location: Cape Noshappu, Wakkanai, Japan
- Coordinates: 45°26′58″N 141°38′43″E

Tower
- Constructed: 1900
- Height: 42.7 m (140 ft)

Light
- First lit: 10 December 1900
- Characteristic: Fl(2) W 20s fl 6s, ec 14s

Wakkanai Lighthouse (稚内灯台, Wakkanai tōdai) is a lighthouse in the city of Wakkanai, Hokkaido, Japan. Rising to a height of 42.7 metres (140 ft), it is the tallest lighthouse on the island and the second tallest in Japan, after Hinomisaki Lighthouse (日御碕灯台) in Izumo. The old Wakkanai Lighthouse was built in 1900 in the hills above, but was forced to relocate after the area was taken over for a US base, the site now occupied by a JGSDF radar station. This first lighthouse provided one of the locations for the filming of Shochiku's 1957 Times of Joy and Sorrow. Wakkanai Lighthouse was rebuilt to the same height in its current location in 1966. With its vibrant red and white stripes, the lighthouse is today a symbol of Cape Noshappu and is made accessible to the general public by Wakkanai Coast Guard from the start of Golden Week each year.

== See also ==
- List of lighthouses in Japan
- Cape Sōya Lighthouse
