= Sōya Misaki Wind Farm =

Sōya Misaki Wind Farm 宗谷岬ウインドファーム
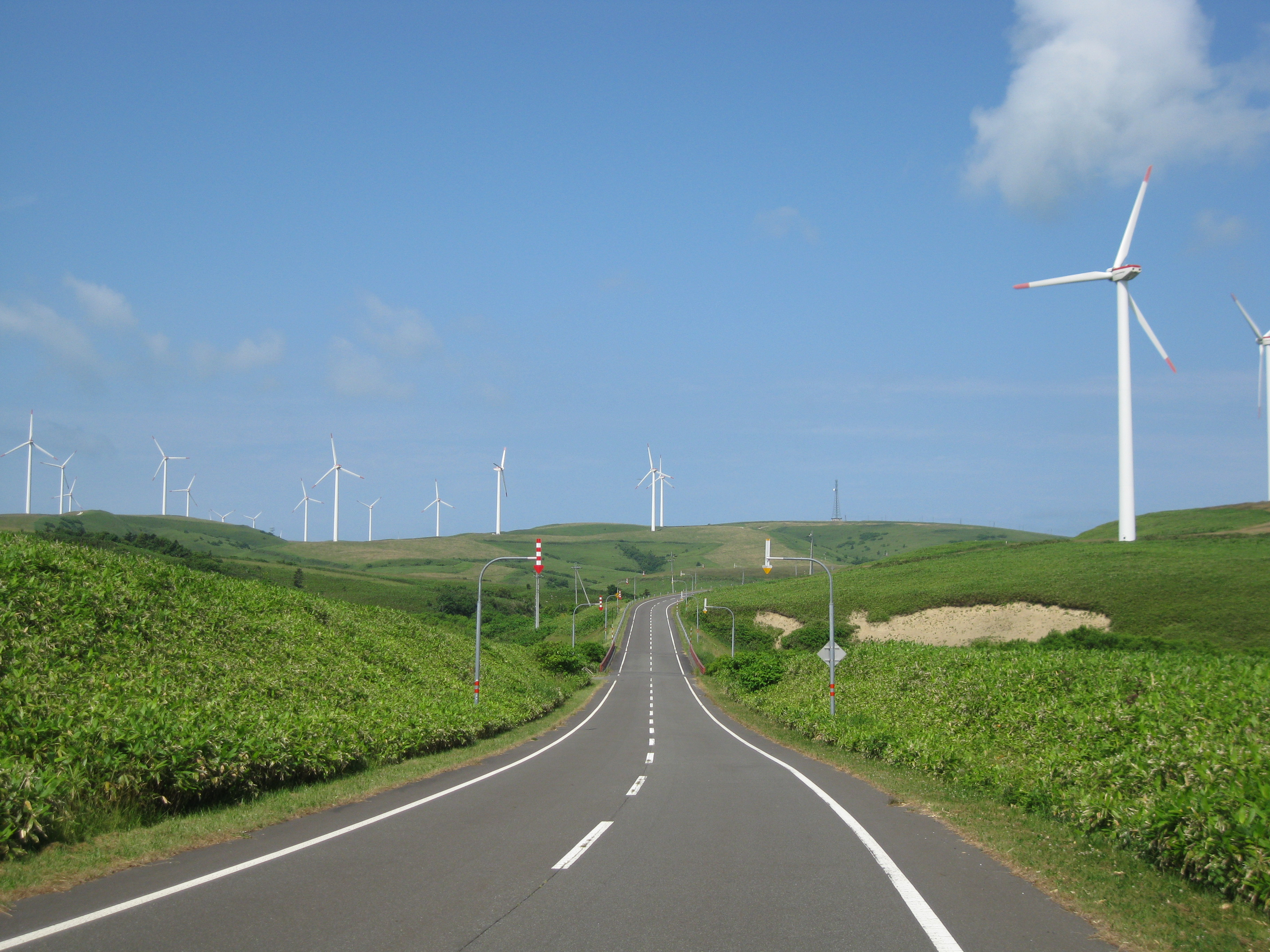
- Country: Japan
- Location: Wakkanai, Hokkaidō
- Coordinates: 45°28′13″N 141°54′55″E
- Status: Operational
- Commission date: November 2005
- Construction cost: ¥12 billion (Mitsubishi Heavy Industries)
- Operator: Eurus Energy

Power generation
- Units operational: 57 x 1 MW turbines
- Nameplate capacity: 57,000 kW

External links
- Website: www.eurus-energy.com/project/project-jp/376/
- Commons: Related media on Commons

Sōya Misaki Wind Farm (宗谷岬ウインドファーム, Sōya-misaki Uindo Fāmu) is a wind farm in the Sōya Hills near the eponymous Cape Sōya in Wakkanai, Hokkaidō, Japan. With fifty-seven turbines each with a capacity of one megawatt, when completed in 2005 it became Japan's largest wind farm, capable of powering approximately 41,000 households and with a theoretical annual emissions reduction of 120,000 tons of CO_{2} relative to an oil-fired power station of equal capacity. It is one of a complementary network of wind power generation facilities in Wakkanai which together, eight-four turbines in all with a combined total capacity of 106,355 kilowatts, generate approximately 120% of the city's electricity demands. In 2019, with the operator planning to replace the fifty-seven one megawatt turbines with fifteen four megawatt turbines, the Ministry of the Environment raised concerns about the number of bird strikes, in particular those involving white-tailed eagles, Steller's sea eagles, and migrating swans.

== See also ==
- Environmental impact of wind power
- Lake Ōnuma
