= Wakkanai Karafuto Museum =

- 稚内市樺太記念館
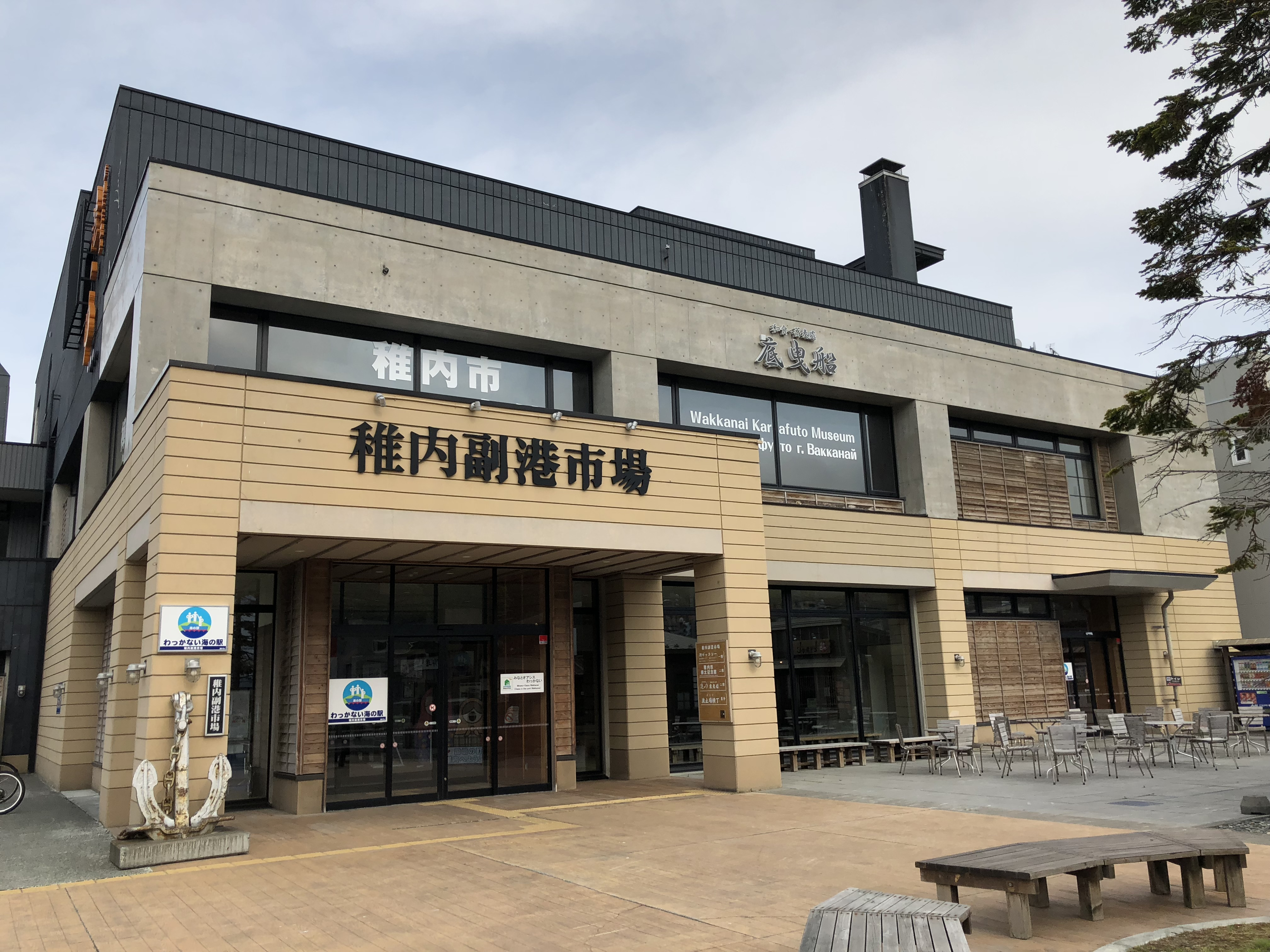
- Wakkanai Karafuto Museum is on Floor 2 of Wakkanai Fukukō Market
- Interactive map of the Wakkanai Karafuto Museum area

General information
- Location: 1-6 Minato, Wakkanai, Hokkaidō, Japan
- Coordinates: 45°24′30″N 141°40′36″E
- Opened: June 2018

Website
- Official website

Wakkanai Karafuto Museum (稚内市樺太記念館, Wakkanai-shi Karafuto Kinenkan) opened in Wakkanai, Hokkaidō, Japan in 2018. The display documents the history of Karafuto and its connections with the area and includes materials relating to the Chihaku ferry.

== See also ==
- Wakkanai Park
- Evacuation of Karafuto and Kuriles
