= Cape Bakkai =

Promontory in Wakkanai, Hokkaidō, Japan

Coordinates: 45°18′43″N 141°36′43″E

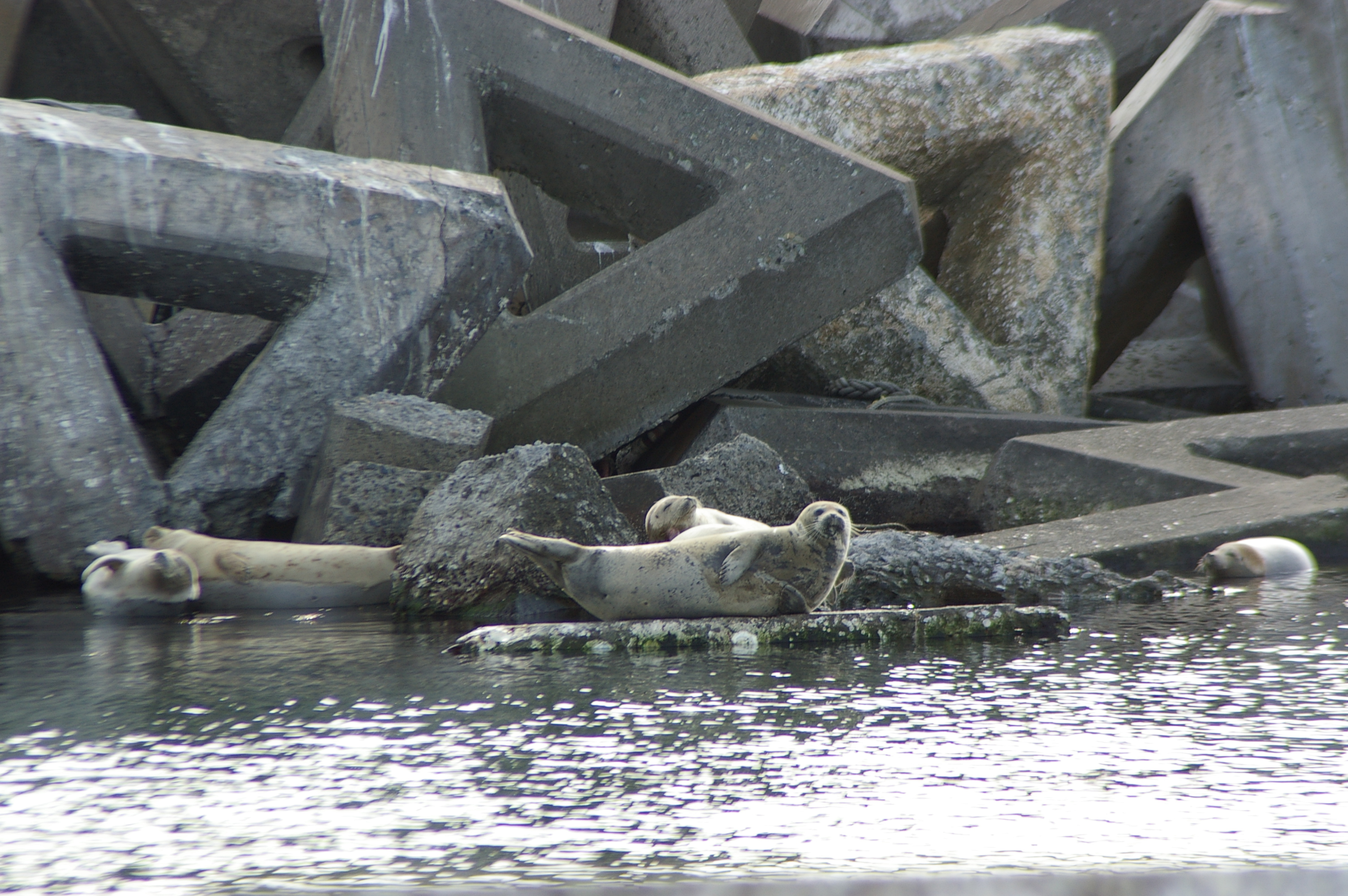
Spotted seals in the harbour

Cape Bakkai (抜海岬, Bakkai-misaki) is a small promontory on the Sea of Japan coast facing towards the islands of Rishiri and Rebun in Wakkanai, Hokkaidō, Japan. On the south side of the cape is Bakkai Port, where each winter spotted seals that float in on drift ice take shelter. A short distance inland, on the other side of Prefectural Road 106 (ja), is the Bakkai Rock Shelter Site. Bakkai is a nigoried form of the Ainu pakkai, meaning something carried on one's back like a child: Bakkai rock, which rises to a height of approximately 30 metres (98 ft), has the appearance of a smaller rock atop one that is larger.

== See also ==
- Bakkai Station
- Cape Sōya
- Cape Noshappu
- Rishiri-Rebun-Sarobetsu National Park
