= Hokkaido Wakkanai High School =

Secondary school in Hokkaido, Japan

Coordinates: 45.3906°N 141.6974°E

Hokkaido Wakkanai High School Japanese: 北海道稚内高等学校
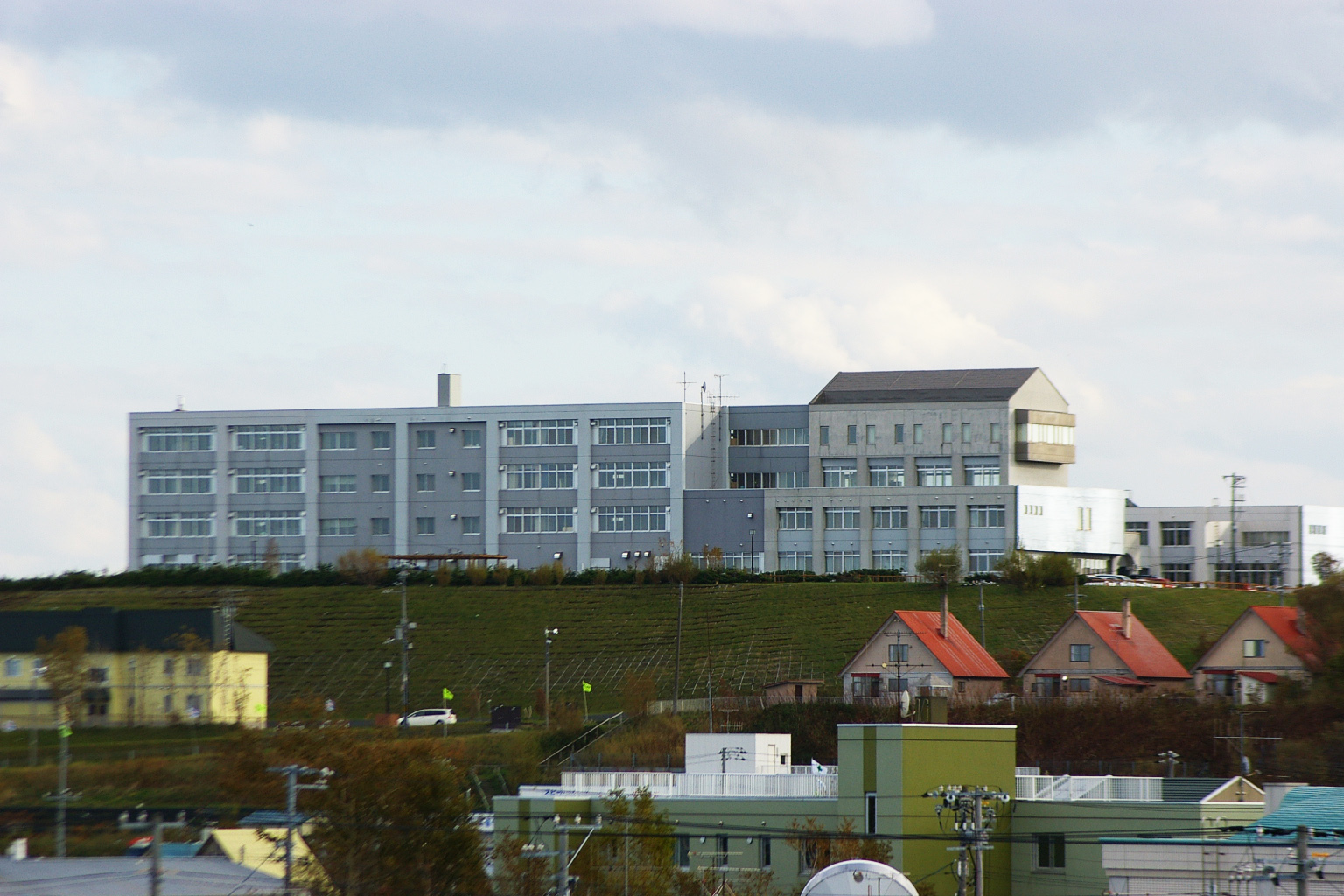

Information
- Established: 1950; 75 years ago
- School board: Hokkaidō Prefectural Board of Education
- Website: www.chikou.hokkaido-c.ed.jp

Hokkaido Wakkanai High School (Japanese: 北海道稚内高等学校, romanized: Hokkaidō Wakkanai Kōtō Gakkō) is a high school in Wakkanai, Hokkaido, Japan, founded in 1950. Hokkaido Wakkanai High School is one of the high schools administrated by Hokkaido.

The school is operated by the Hokkaido Prefectural Board of Education.

== Address ==
- Address: Sakae-1choume-4-1, Wakkanai, Hokkaido
