= Hokumon Shrine =

Shinto shrine in Wakkanai, Hokkaidō, Japan

Hokumon Jinja (北門神社)
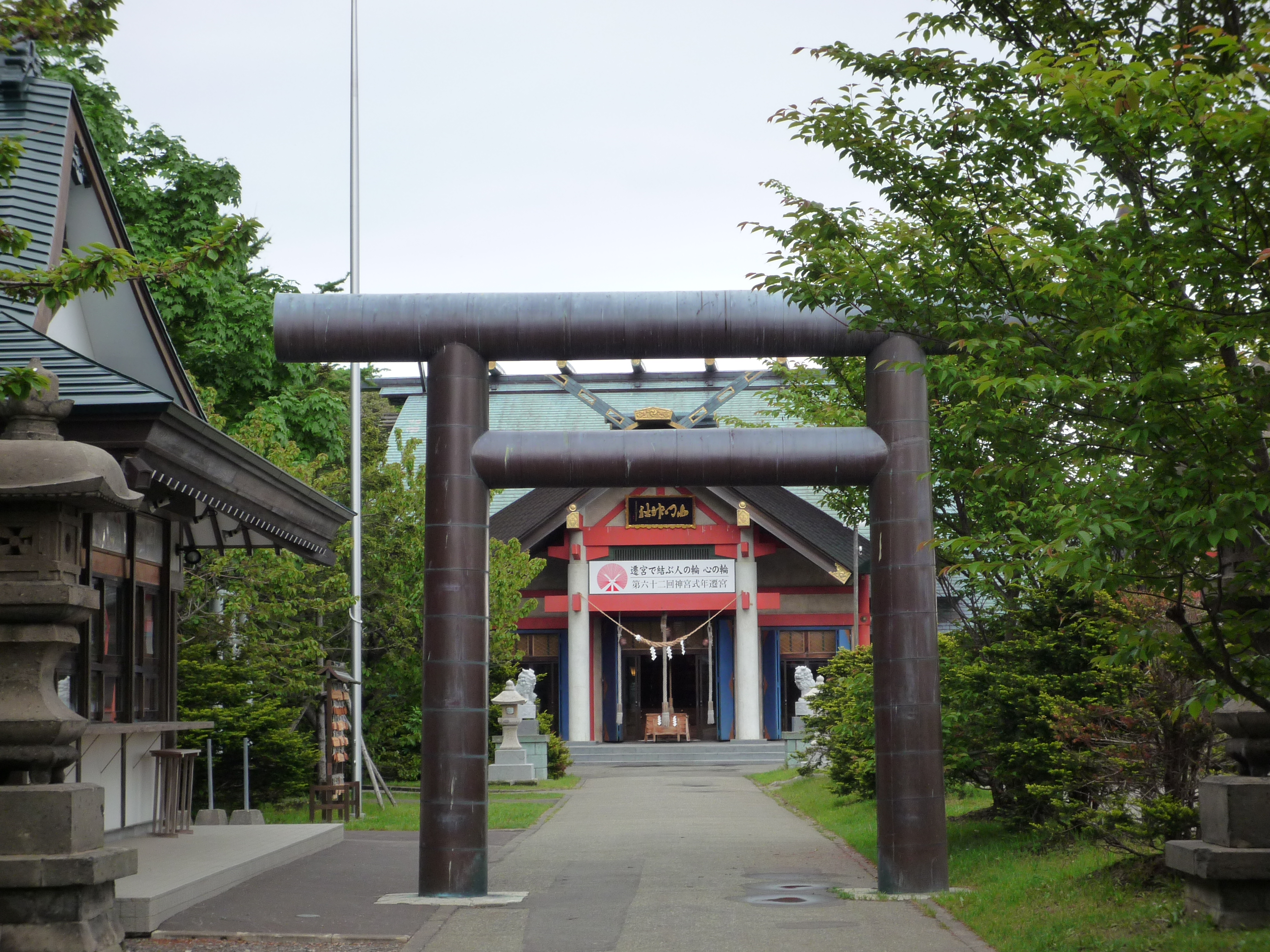

- Location within Japan

Religion
- Affiliation: Shinto
- Deity: Amaterasu; Takemikazuchi; Kotoshironushi
- Festival: 5 July

Location
- Location: 1-1-21 Chūō, Wakkanai, Hokkaidō, Japan
- Interactive map of Hokumon Jinja (北門神社)
- Coordinates: 45.419942°N 141.671295°E

Architecture
- Style: Shinmei-zukuri
- Founder: Murayama Denbee (村山伝兵衛)
- Established: Tenmei 5 (1785)

Hokumon Jinja (北門神社) is a Shinto shrine in Wakkanai, Hokkaidō, Japan. In Tenmei 5 (1785), Matsumae Domain trader and agent Murayama Denbee (村山伝兵衛) (1738–1813) is said to have founded the small shrine of Sōya Daijingū (宗谷大神宮), enshrining Amaterasu as guardian of the north gate. In 1896 the shrine was transferred to its current location and renamed Hokumon Jinja, with Takemikazuchi and Kotoshironushi enshrined alongside Amaterasu. In 1902 work on the shrine buildings was completed, but on 17 May 1911 the whole complex was destroyed by a wild fire. The year 1913 saw the rebuilding of the honden and haiden and in 1916 Hokuman Jinja was ranked as a Village Shrine. In 1925 the shrine offices were donated and in 1933 Hokumon Jinja was promoted to the rank of District Shrine. The hexagonal shrine mikoshi was dedicated in 1949 and in 1978 the new shrine building was completed and a transfer ceremony held.

== See also ==
- List of Shinto shrines
- Modern system of ranked Shinto Shrines
