= Sōya Bay =

- 宗谷湾 (Japanese)
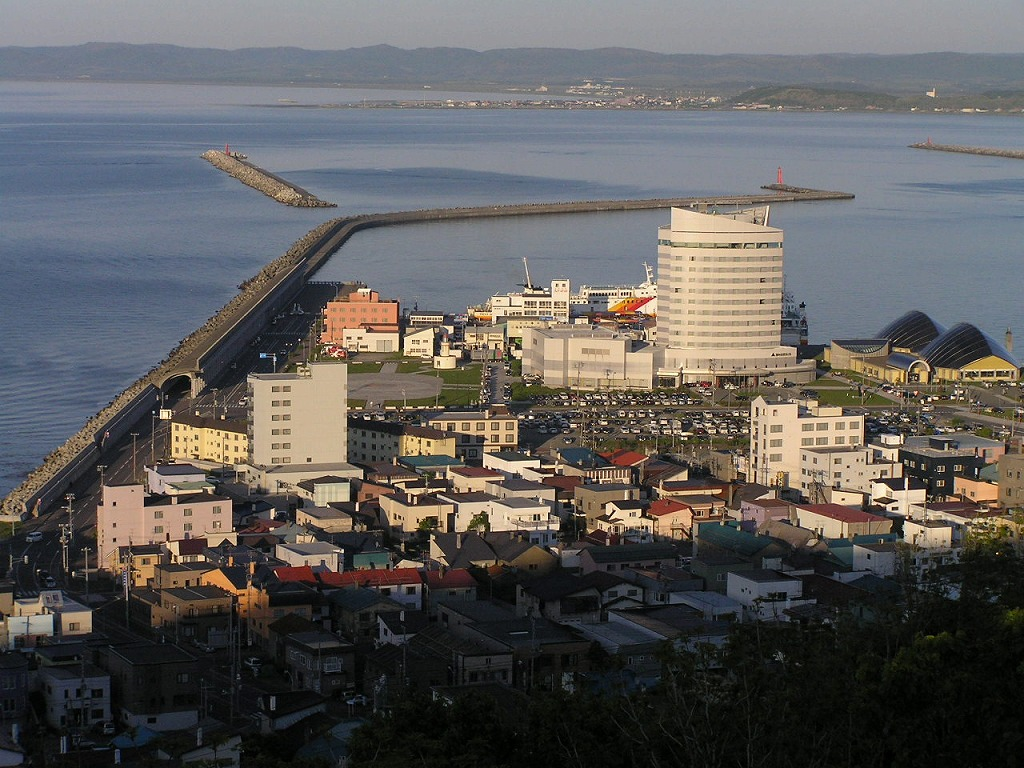
- Wakkanai Port opening onto Sōya Bay

- Location within Hokkaido
- Location: Wakkanai, Hokkaidō, Japan
- Coordinates: 45°28′16″N 141°47′53″E

Sōya Bay (宗谷湾, Sōya-wan) is a bay on the north coast of Hokkaidō, Japan. It is demarcated by Cape Sōya to the east and Cape Noshappu to the west, with Wakkanai Port to the southwest, and the Sōya Straits to the north. The Koetoi is the main river that flows into the bay. In the middle of the bay mouth, the water is approximately 30 metres (98 ft) deep, while the bed is of rock or sand.

== See also ==
- Cape Bakkai
- Sōya Hills
