= Cape Noshappu =

Cape in Hokkaido, Japan

Cape Noshappu 野寒布岬 (ノシャップ岬)
- Cape
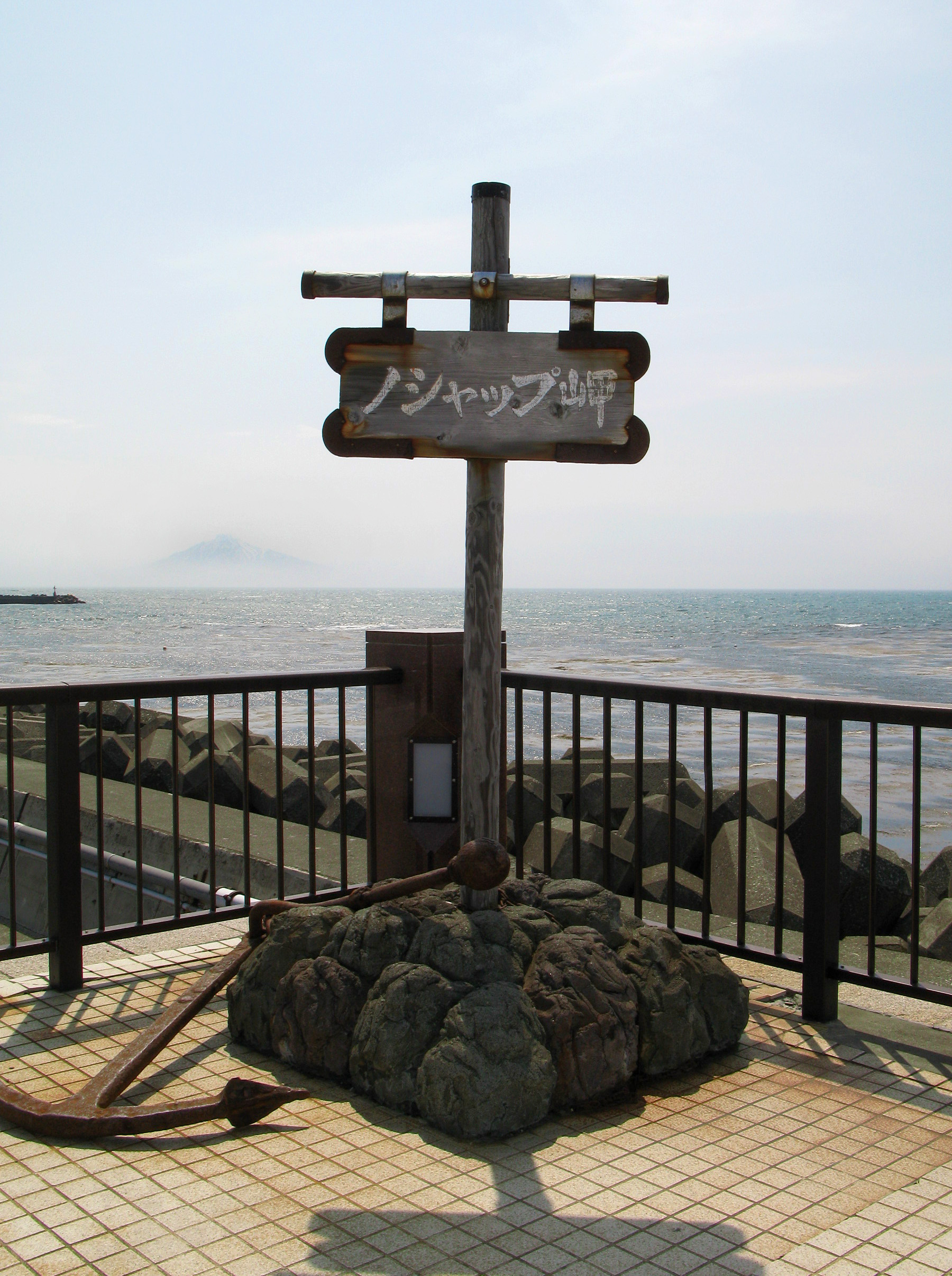
- Cape Noshappu Monument

- Location within Hokkaido Location within Japan
- Coordinates: 45.4496°N 141.6453°E
- Location: Wakkanai, Sōya Subprefecture, Hokkaido, Japan
- Water bodies: Sea of Japan

Cape Noshappu (野寒布岬, Noshappu-misaki) is a cape near Cape Sōya in the north of Hokkaido, Japan. It is located in the municipality of Wakkanai, Sōya Subprefecture. Facing the Sōya Strait, it separates the Sea of Japan and Sōya Bay.

The origin of the name is the Ainu language word "ノッサㇺ (not-sam)", meaning "near the jaw (cape)".

Wakkanai Lighthouse is located nearby, from which Rishiri Island and Rebun Island are visible when clear. Esandomari Fishing Port Park (恵山泊漁港公園) lies in southwest of the cape and Wakkanai Municipal Noshappu Current Aquarium (稚内市立ノシャップ寒流水族館) are also in the vicinity.

== Gallery ==
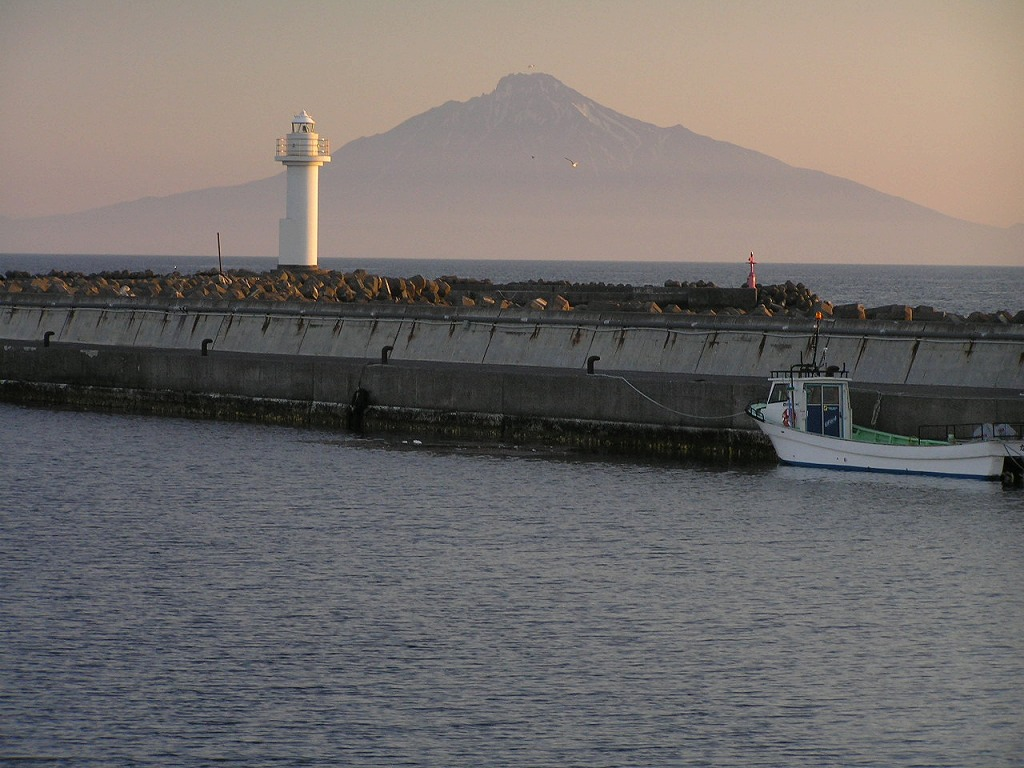
Rishiri Fuji seen from noshappu-cape

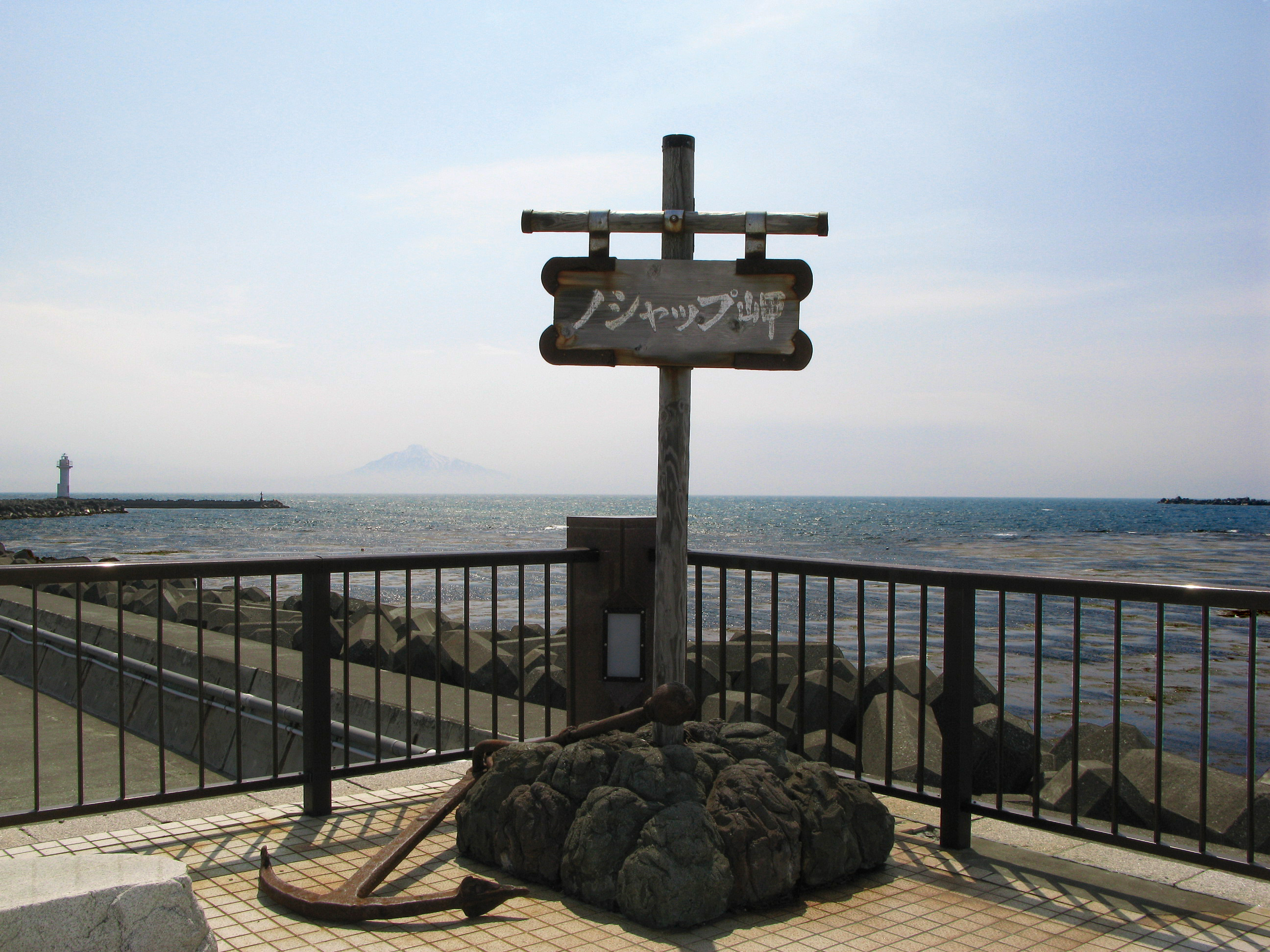
Noshappu Cape in early summer

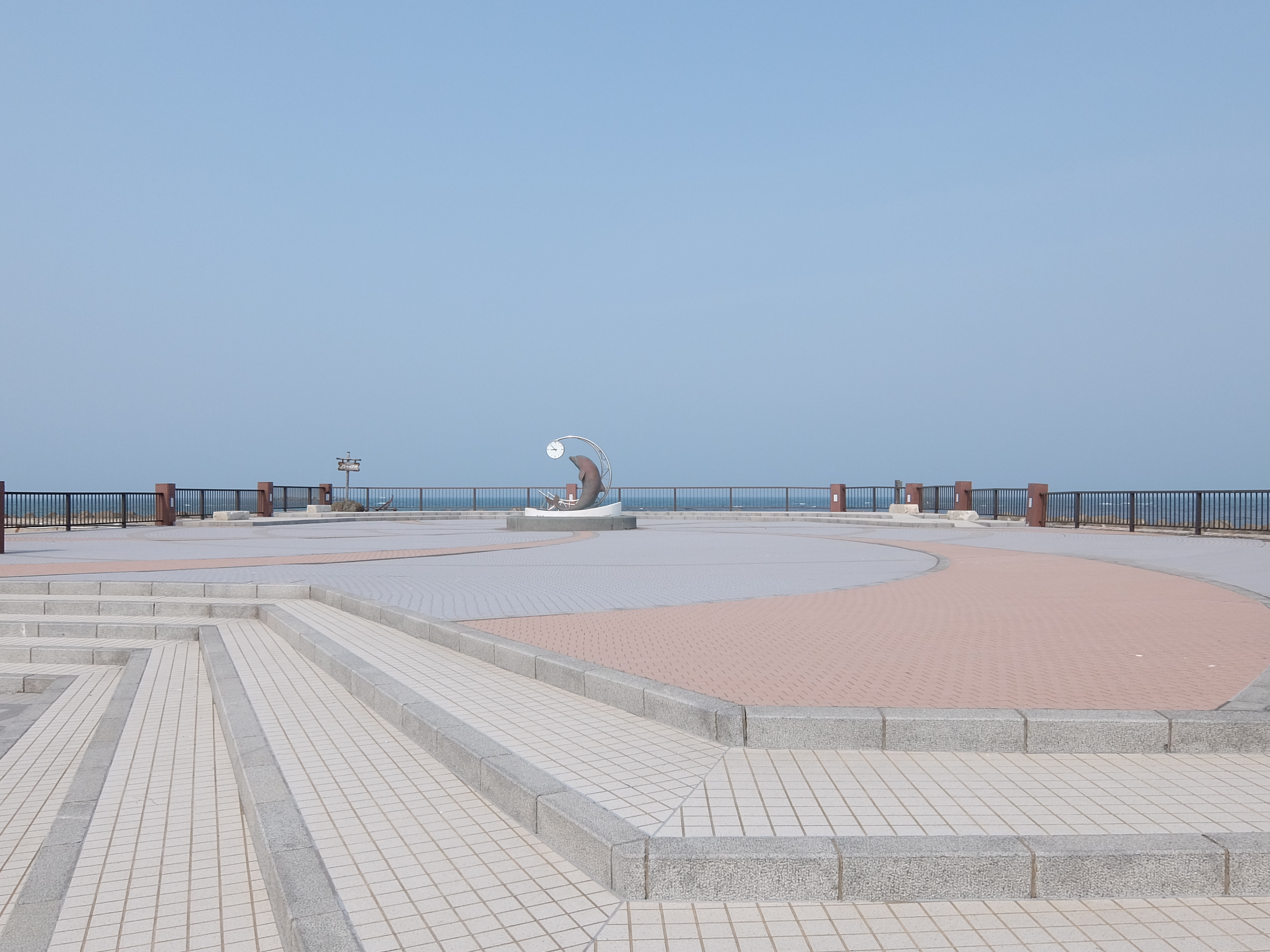
in Esandomari Fishing Port Park

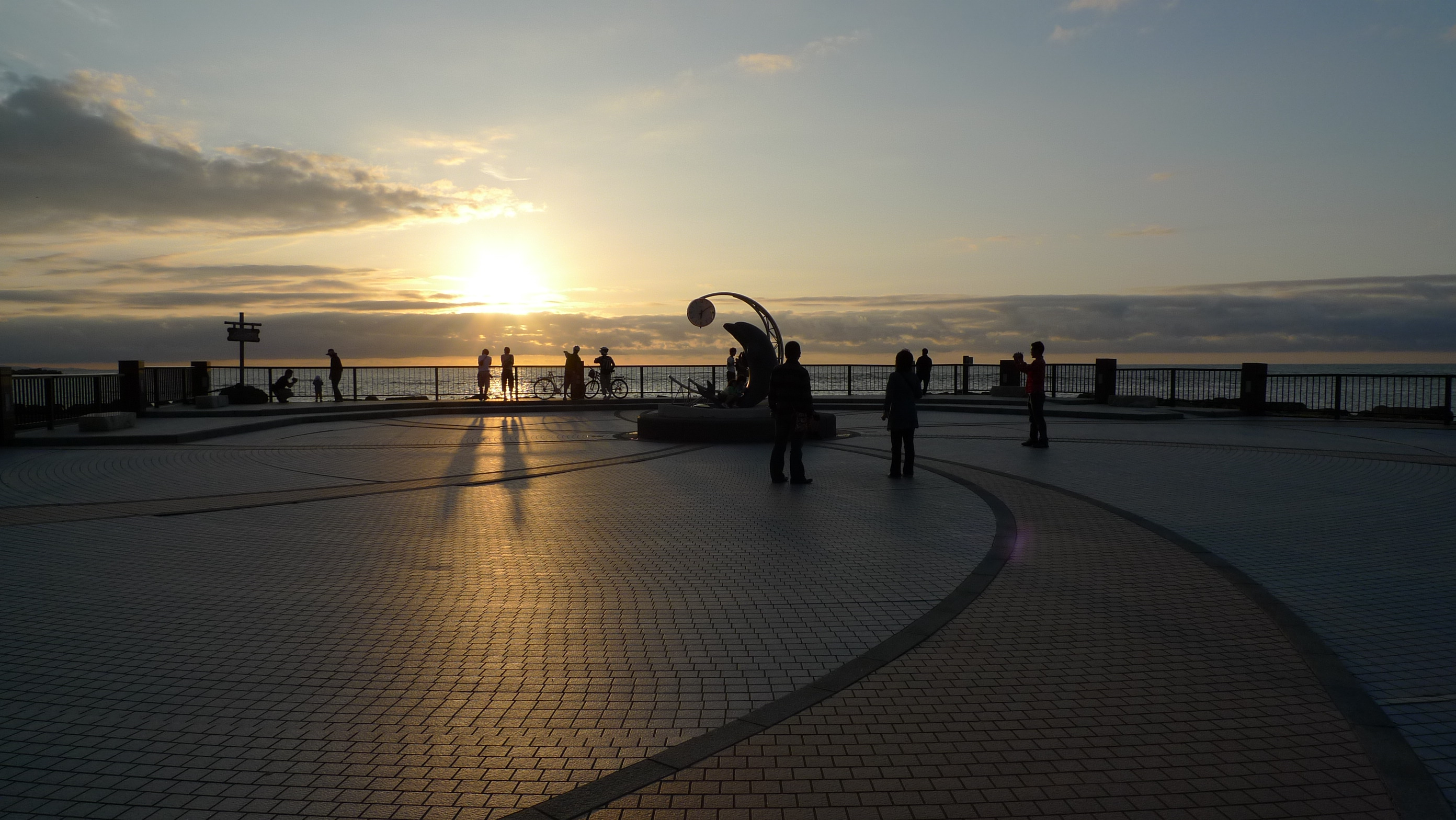
the cape in Aug 2010
