= Ikueikan University =

- 育英館大
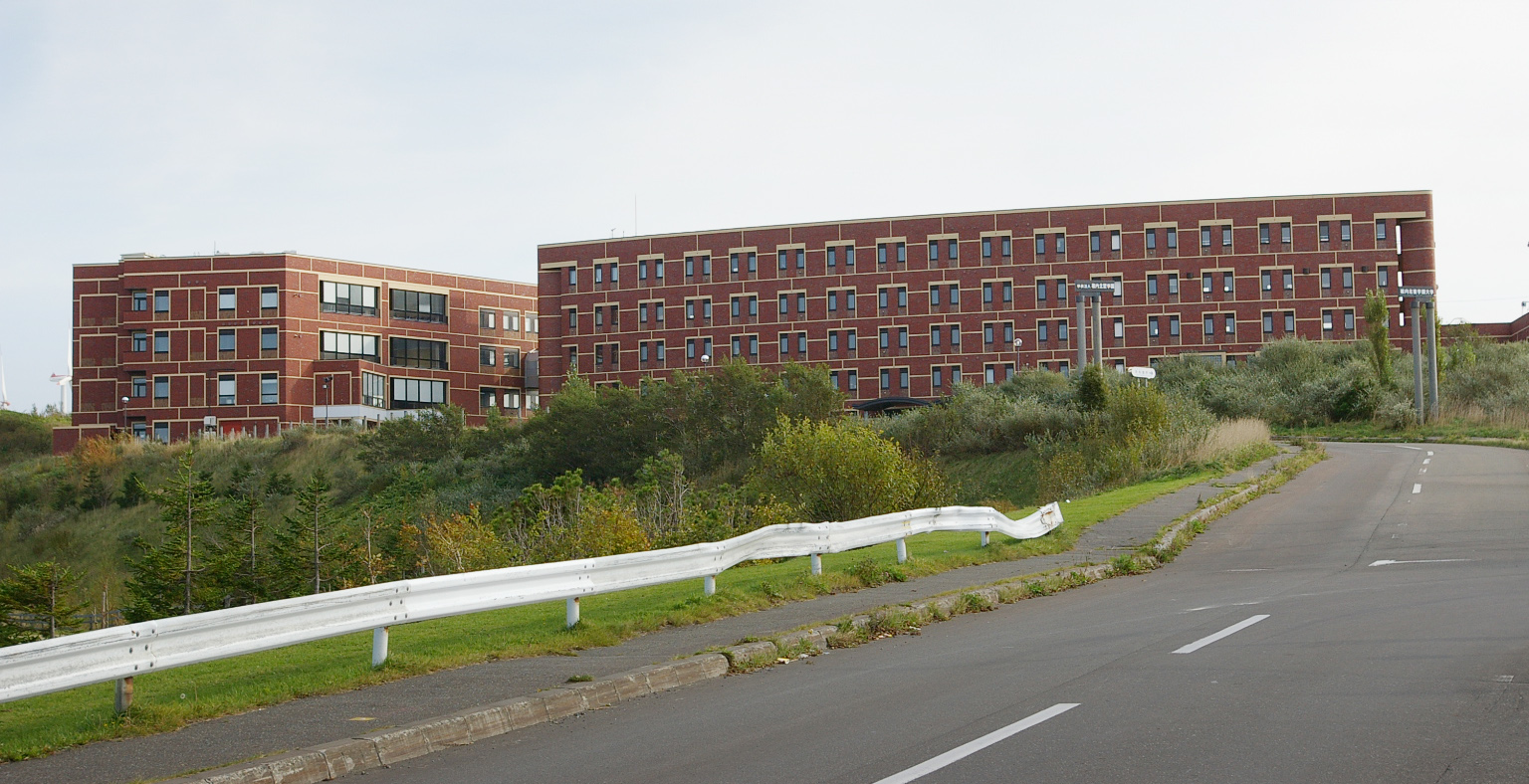
- Former names: Wakkanai Hokusei Gakuen University (稚内北星学園大学, Wakkanai hokusei gakuen daigaku)
- Type: Private
- Established: April 1987; 39 years ago
- President: Saito Yoshihiro
- Location: 1-2290-28 Wakabadai, Wakkanai City, Hokkaido, 097-0013, Japan; 45.382831°N 141.718363°E
- Language: Japanese
- Website: www.wakhok.ac.jp

Ikueikan University (育英館大, Ikuei-kan daigaku), previously known as Wakkanai Hokusei Gakuen University, is a private university in Wakkanai, Hokkaido, Japan, established in 1987.

The institution was founded as a junior college in 1987 and in 2000 became a four-year university. A Tokyo branch was opened in 2004.

In December 2020, it was announced that the school would change its name to Ikueikan University (育英館大, Ikuei-kan daigaku) starting April 2022.
