= Koetoi River =

River in Hokkaidō, Japan

Koetoi River 声問川
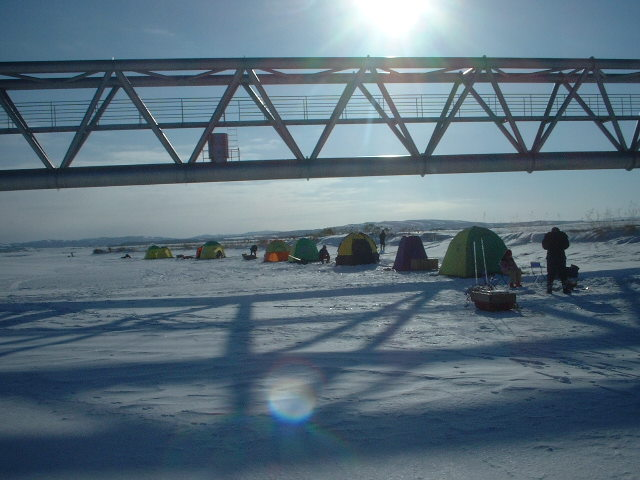
- Ice fishing for Wakasagi. (January 2004)

- Location within Japan
- Native name: Koetoi-gawa (Japanese)

Location
- Country: Japan
- State: Hokkaidō
- Region: Sōya
- District: Wakkanai

Physical characteristics
- Source: Mount Etanpakku
  - location: Wakkanai, Hokkaidō, Japan
  - coordinates: 45°13′50″N 142°0′48″E
  - elevation: 313 m (1,027 ft)
- Mouth: Sōya Bay
  - location: Wakkanai, Hokkaidō, Japan
  - coordinates: 45°24′27″N 141°45′20″E
  - elevation: 0 m (0 ft)
- Length: 41.9 km (26.0 mi)
- Basin size: 294.8 km^{2} (113.8 sq mi)

Koetoi River (声問川, Koetoi-gawa) is a river in Hokkaidō, Japan.
