= Wakkanai Park =

Park in Wakkanai, Hokkaido

- 稚内公園
- Location within Hokkaido Location within Japan
- Location: Wakkanai, Hokkaidō, Japan
- Coordinates: 45°25′01″N 141°40′03″E
- Area: 45.2 hectares (112 acres)
- Created: 17 June 1961
- Public transit: Wakkanai Station

Wakkanai Park (稚内公園, Wakkani Kōen) was established in Wakkanai, Hokkaidō, Japan in 1961. Covering some 45 hectares (110 acres), when combined with the adjacent Forest Park, there is total area of approximately 100 hectares (250 acres) for "citizens to relax". Located on a hillside overlooking the Sōya Straits, within the park there are a number of memorials that, along with those of Cape Sōya, that to the Chihaku ferry near the North Breakwater Dome, the Northern Memorial Museum inside the park, and the Wakkanai Karafuto Museum, together help give Wakkanai the greatest density of "proxy" Karafuto lieux de mémoire in Hokkaidō.

== Monuments ==
The "Gate of Ice and Snow" (氷雪の門, Hyōsetsu no mon) is a memorial to those who died in Karafuto. At its centre is a statue of a woman with a look of pain and anguish, her face to the heavens and hands to the earth, her back to Sakhalin. An inscription explains that the monument expresses "grief at the loss of everything held dear". The memorial was built by Sapporo sculptor Hongō Shin (本郷新) in 1963 and has the more formal name of Karafuto Islanders Memorial (樺太島民慰霊碑). This memorial is flanked to the left, when facing the sea, by a monument to the "Nine Maidens of Maoka" (九人の乙女の像), nine telephone operators at the post office in Maoka, now Kholmsk, who committed suicide on 20 August 1945 during the Soviet Invasion of South Sakhalin, and, to the right, by a monument inscribed with a poem by the Shōwa Emperor, composed when he heard the story during his visit with Empress Kōjun in 1968.

Also in the park is a monument to the Sakhalin huskies, trained in Wakkanai Park, who have served on expeditions to Antarctica. In particular it celebrates a pair of sled dogs named Tarō and Jirō, who survived for a year when the 1958 expedition was abandoned due to bad weather, while a memorial tower comforts the souls of those dogs who have perished along the way.

== See also ==
- Karafuto 1945 Summer Hyosetsu no Mon (1974 film)
- Antarctica (1983 film)
- Evacuation of Karafuto and Kuriles
- Rishiri-Rebun-Sarobetsu National Park
- Cape Sōya
