= Wakkanai =

Wakkanai 稚内市
- City
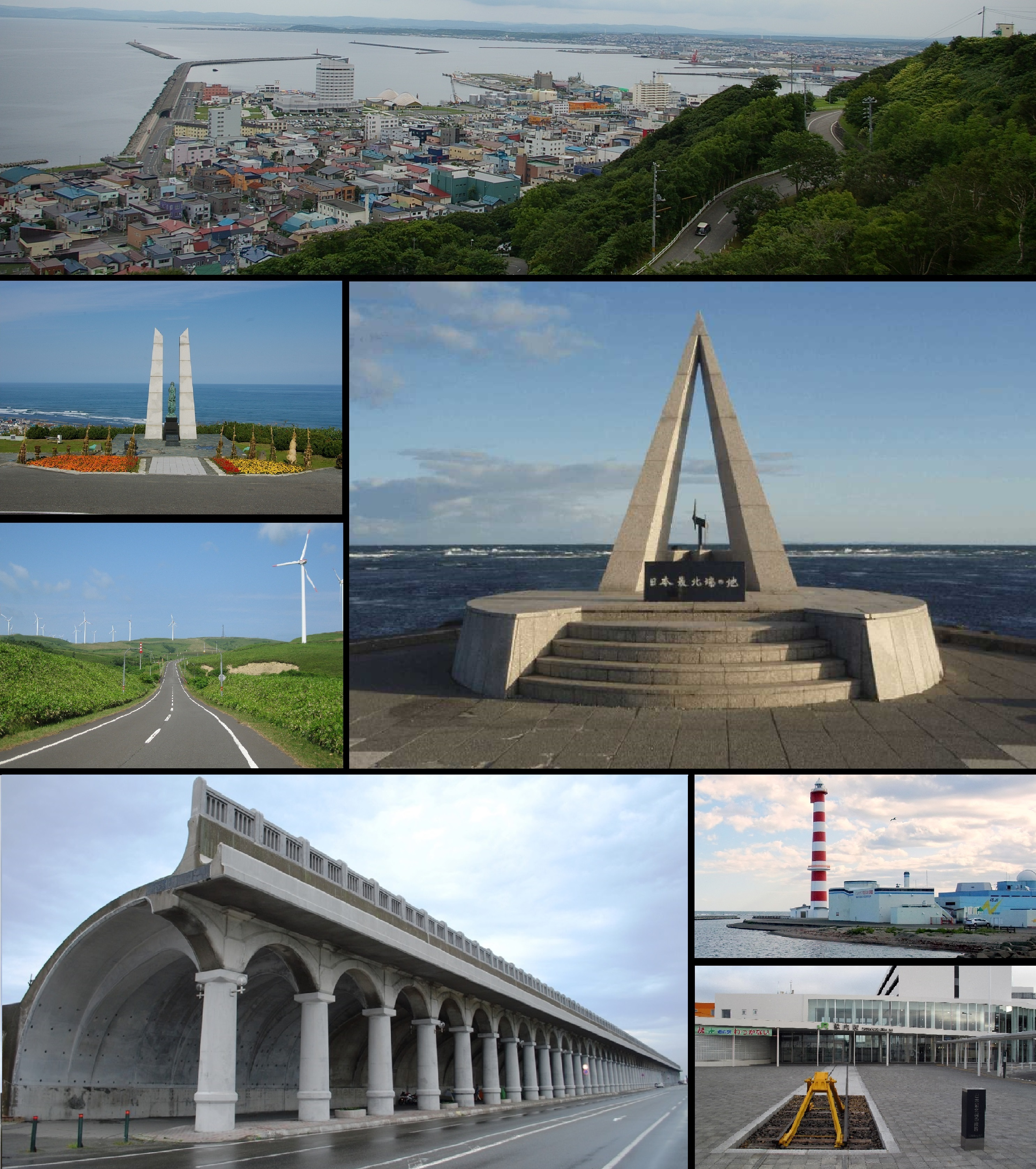
- Clockwise from top: View of Wakkanai from Wakkanai Park, Cape Sōya monument, Wakkanai Lighthouse in Cape Nossapu, Wakkanai Train Station, North Breakwater Dome, Cape Sōya Wind Farm, Wakkanai Ice Snow Gate

- Flag Seal
- Location of Wakkanai in Hokkaido, highlighted in pink

- Coordinates: 45°24′56″N 141°40′23″E
- Country: Japan
- Region: Hokkaido
- Prefecture: Hokkaido

Government
  - Mayor: Hiroshi Kudo (since May 2011)

Area
  - Total: 761.42 km^{2} (293.99 sq mi)

Population (July 31, 2024)
  - Total: 30,590
  - Density: 40.17/km^{2} (104.1/sq mi)
- Time zone: UTC+9 (Japan Standard Time)
- Phone number: 0162-23-6161
- Address: 3-13-15 Chūō, Wakkanai-shi, Hokkaido 097-8686
- Climate: Dfb
- Website: Official website
- Symbols
- Flower: Rosa rugosa
- Tree: Sakura, rowan

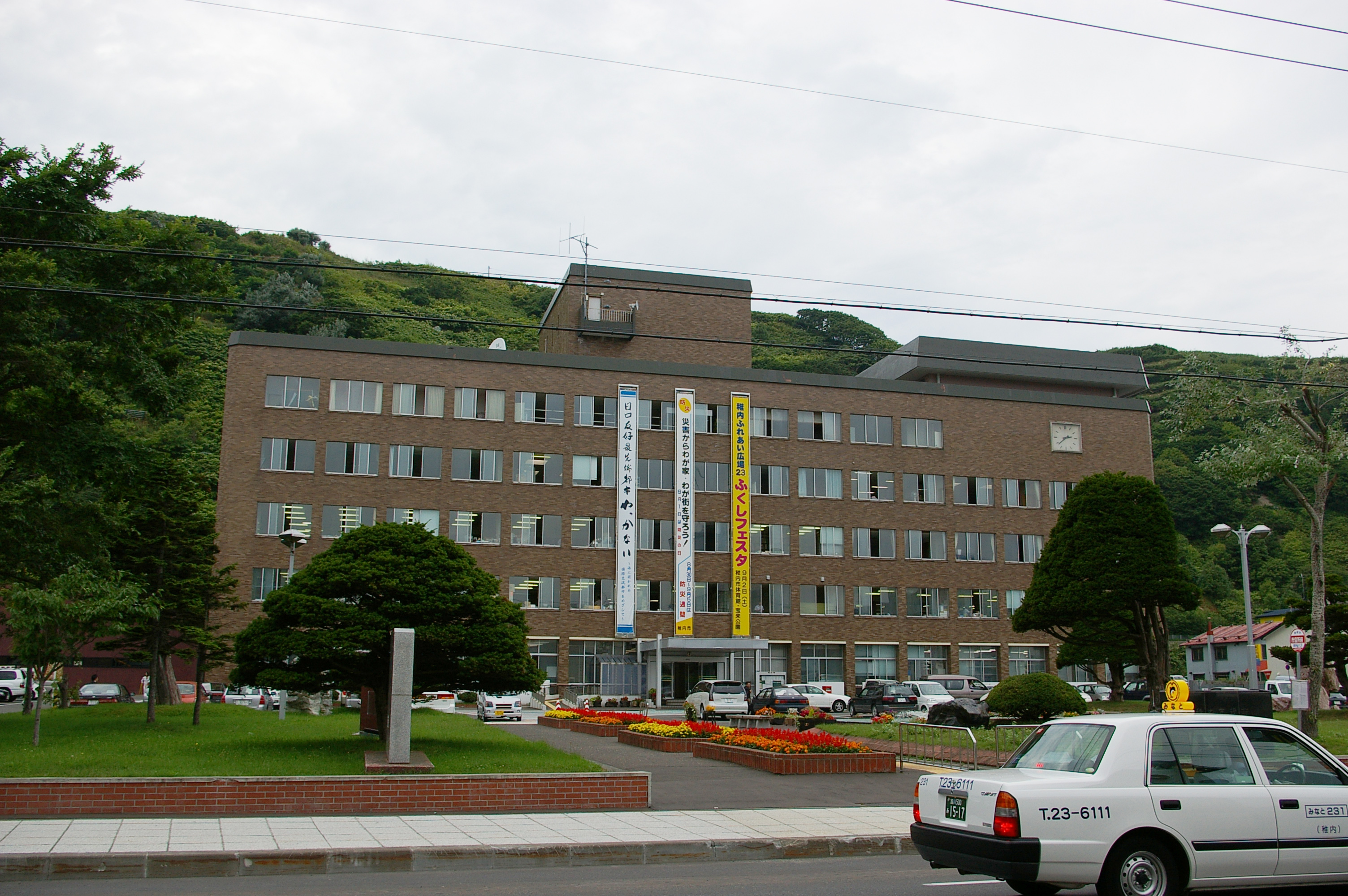
Wakkanai City Hall

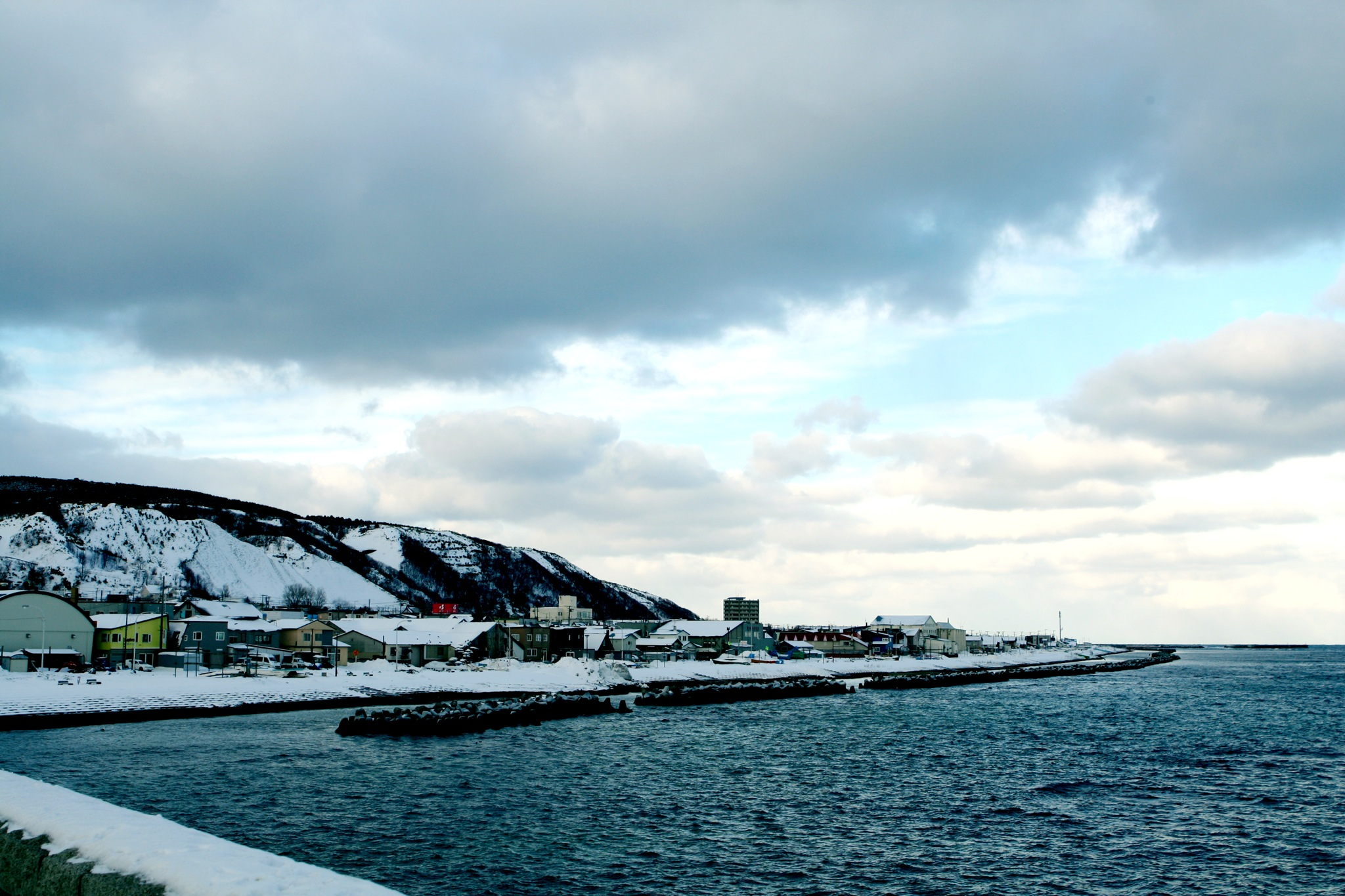
Shore of Wakkanai

Wakkanai (稚内市, Wakkanai-shi; Ainu: ヤㇺワッカナィ Yam-wakka-nay meaning "cold water river" or more literally "cold river valley") is a city located in Sōya Subprefecture, Hokkaido, Japan. Wakkanai is the capital of Sōya Subprefecture. Situated approximately 1,100 km north of Tokyo and 270 km north of Sapporo, it is the northernmost municipality under Japanese administration following the loss of Karafuto (present-day Sakhalin) and the Kuril Islands, with Benten-jima being the northernmost point under Japanese control.

Wakkanai started as the Matsumae Domain's trading post with the Ainu people in 1685. Edo-period explorer Mamiya Rinzō set sail for his famous Karafuto expedition from the settlement. After Japan regained Karafuto following its victory in the Russo-Japanese War in 1905, Wakkanai rose to prominence as a gateway to this reclaimed territory. Two railway lines, the Tempoku and Sōya lines, extended to Wakkanai, and the Chihaku ferry carried passengers further north to Ōdomari in Karafuto. This improved transport network enabled the commercial digging of local coal mines, which had remained untouched due to their remote location.

After the Second World War, Wakkanai lost its status as the gateway to Japan's northern frontier. All coal mines in the area were closed by the 1970s, and Wakkanai's primary industries shifted to fishing, dairy farming, and tourism. The city's population peaked at 55,464 in 1975. The Tempoku Line, which connected Wakkanai to Otoineppu via the coastal town of Hamatonbetsu, was discontinued in 1989. In 1995, the ferry route between Wakkanai and Sakhalin was reestablished for the first time since 1945 but ceased operations in 2015 due to low demand. Today, ferry routes connect the city to the islands of Rishiri and Rebun.

As of 31 July 2024, the city had an estimated population of 30,590 in 17150 households, and a population density of 40 persons per km^{2}. The total area of the city is 761.42 km^{2} (293.99 sq mi).

== Toponomy ==
The name Wakkanai originates from 'yam-wakka-nay' in the Ainu language, meaning 'a stream of cold drinking water'. It is said to refer to a stream that once flowed between the present-day Wakkanai Station and Minami Wakkanai Station.

== History ==
Wakkanai was originally home to an Ainu population. A Japanese settlement was established in 1685 by Matsumae Domain as a trading post and key point for guarding northern Japan and the exploration of Sakhalin. The settlement came under direct control of the Tokugawa shogunate from 1807 to 1821, and again from 1859, when Akita Domain was assigned to provide a garrison. The Akita garrison was replaced by Kanazawa Domain in 1870. After the Treaty of Saint Petersburg (1875), which exchanged Japanese claims on Sakhalin with the Kuril Islands, 841 Japanese settlers in Sakhalin were relocated to Wakkanai. A county office and headman's office established in Soya in 1879, which is regarded as the official foundation of the village of Wakkanai. In 1897, Sōya Subprefecture was established and Wakkanai was elevated to town status in 1901.

During World War II, the Imperial Japanese Navy used the harbor and port as a submarine base. Wakkanai was far enough north to be outside the range of American bombers and was safe from air attacks. Until the early to mid-1960s, the northern portion of the harbor remained divided by concrete sub-mooring pens. At the shore end there was a huge winching mechanism capable of hauling subs up into the partially enclosed structure where they could be repaired while completely out of the water. Built into the hills above the city there were several reinforced concrete bunker-type caves where (anecdotally) they were used either to store ammunition and armament, or as air raid shelters for the civilian populace. During a re-build/renovation of the harbor sometime during the 1960s or 1970s, the harbor was cleared of the concrete pens and the machinery was removed from the breakwater structure which was reconfigured.

Wakkanai was elevated to city status in 1949. In 1955, Wakkanai annexed neighboring Soya village.

== Geography ==
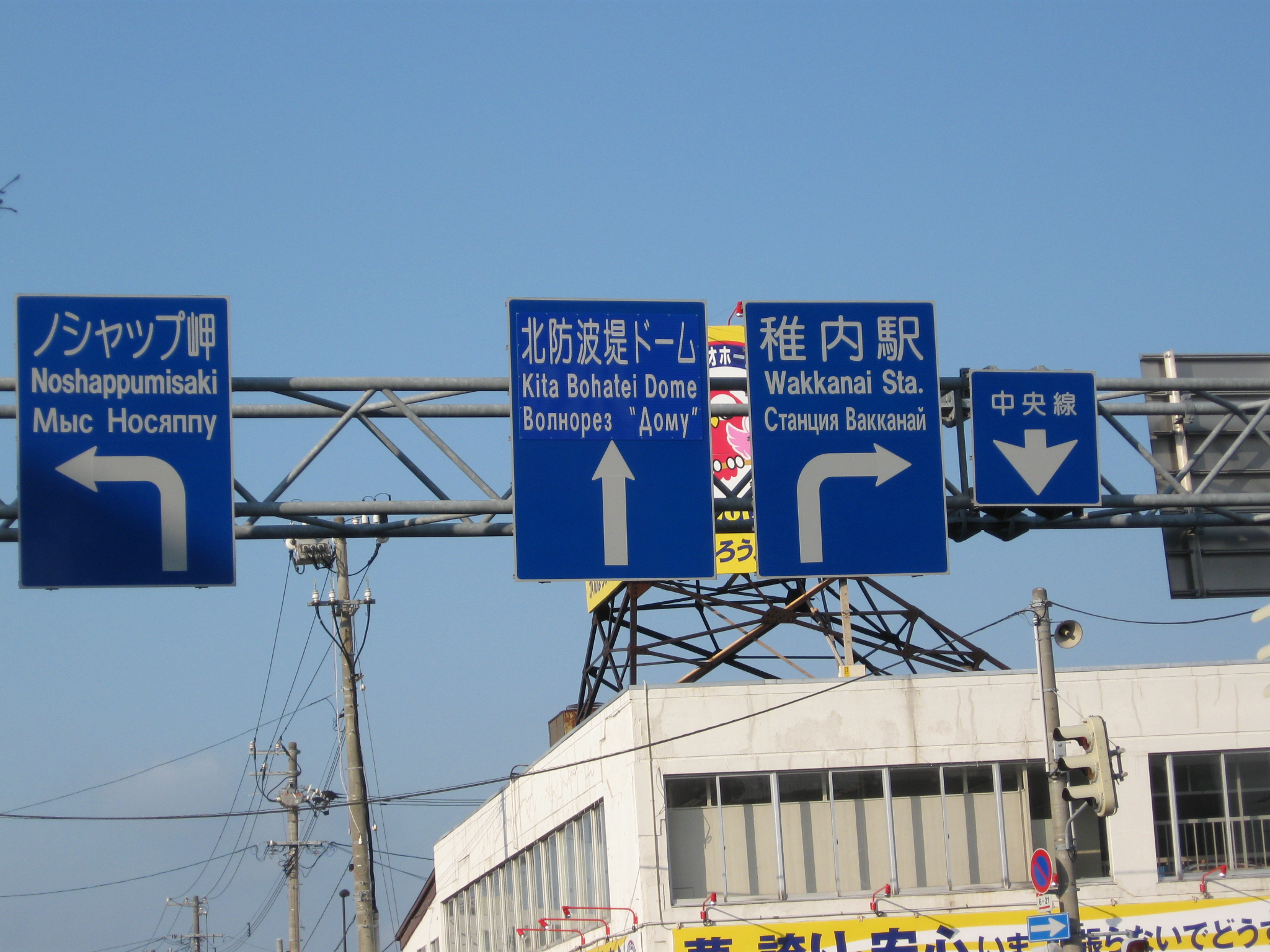
Road signs in Wakkanai also written in Russian for the Russian minorities

Wakkanai is at the northern tip of Hokkaido, and faces the Sea of Japan to the west, Sōya Bay and the Sōya Strait to the north, and the Sea of Okhotsk to the east. Japan's northernmost point, Cape Sōya, is located in Wakkanai, which is on a peninsula jutting towards Sakhalin Island in Russia, which is 43 kilometers (27 miles) away. The city has a length of approximately 39 kilometers from north-to-south and 38 kilometers from east-to-west. The northernmost point is Benten-jima (45°31′35″N, 141°55′09″E), located northwest of Cape Sōya. This is the northernmost point of the land area currently under the effective control of Japan. The topography of the city consists of two hilly mountain ranges running north-to-south, and lowlands in between and at both ends of these. The eastern mountain range is called the "Sōya Hills" and is a periglacial landform that has been selected as a "Hokkaido Heritage Site". The lowlands between the western hills and the Sea of Japan are sand dunes and wetlands, and are part of the Rishiri-Rebun-Sarobetsu National Park.

- Rivers: Koetoi River
- Lakes: Ōnuma Lake

=== Surrounding municipalities ===
- Sarufutsu
- Toyotomi
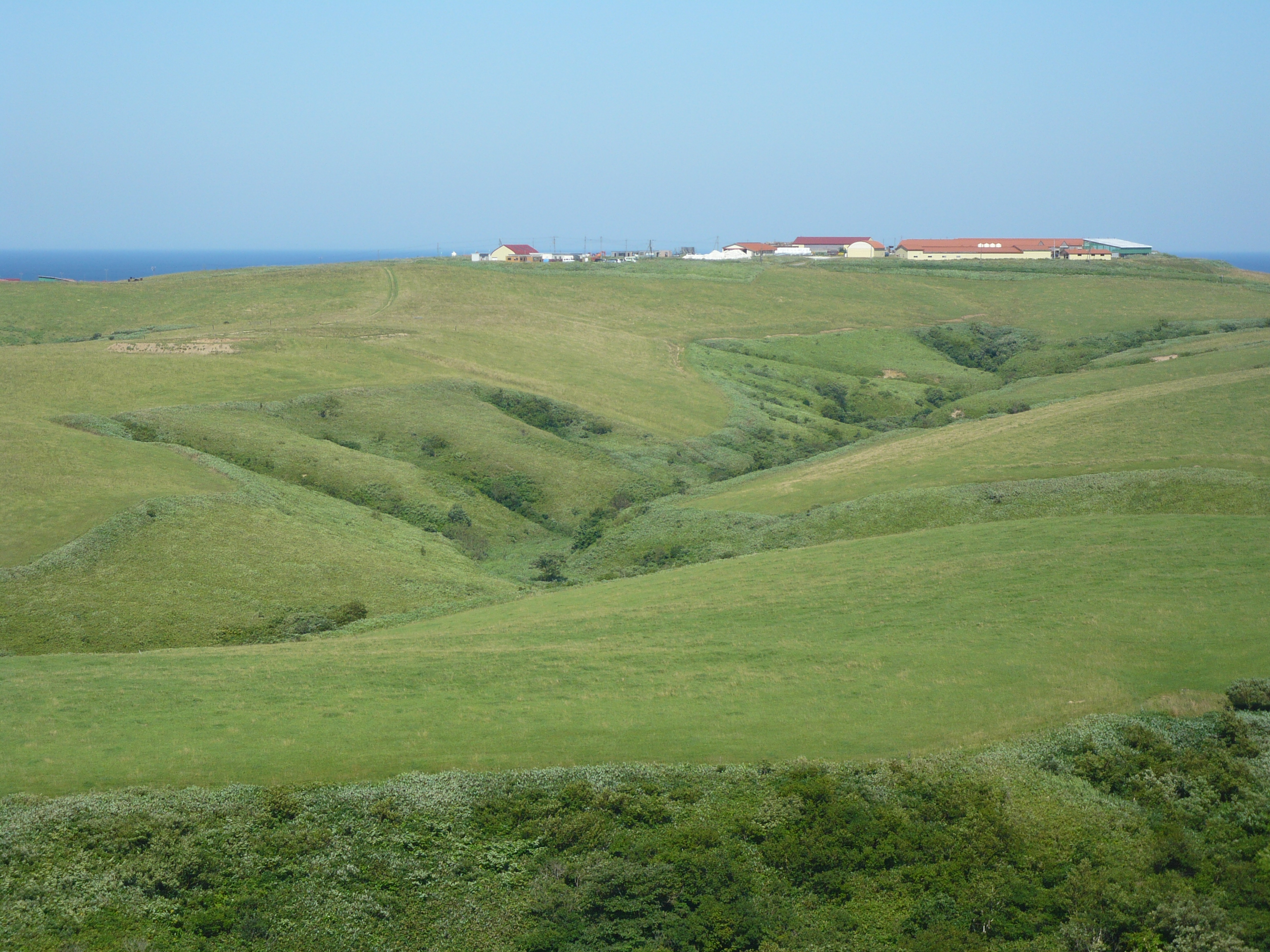
Sōya Hills

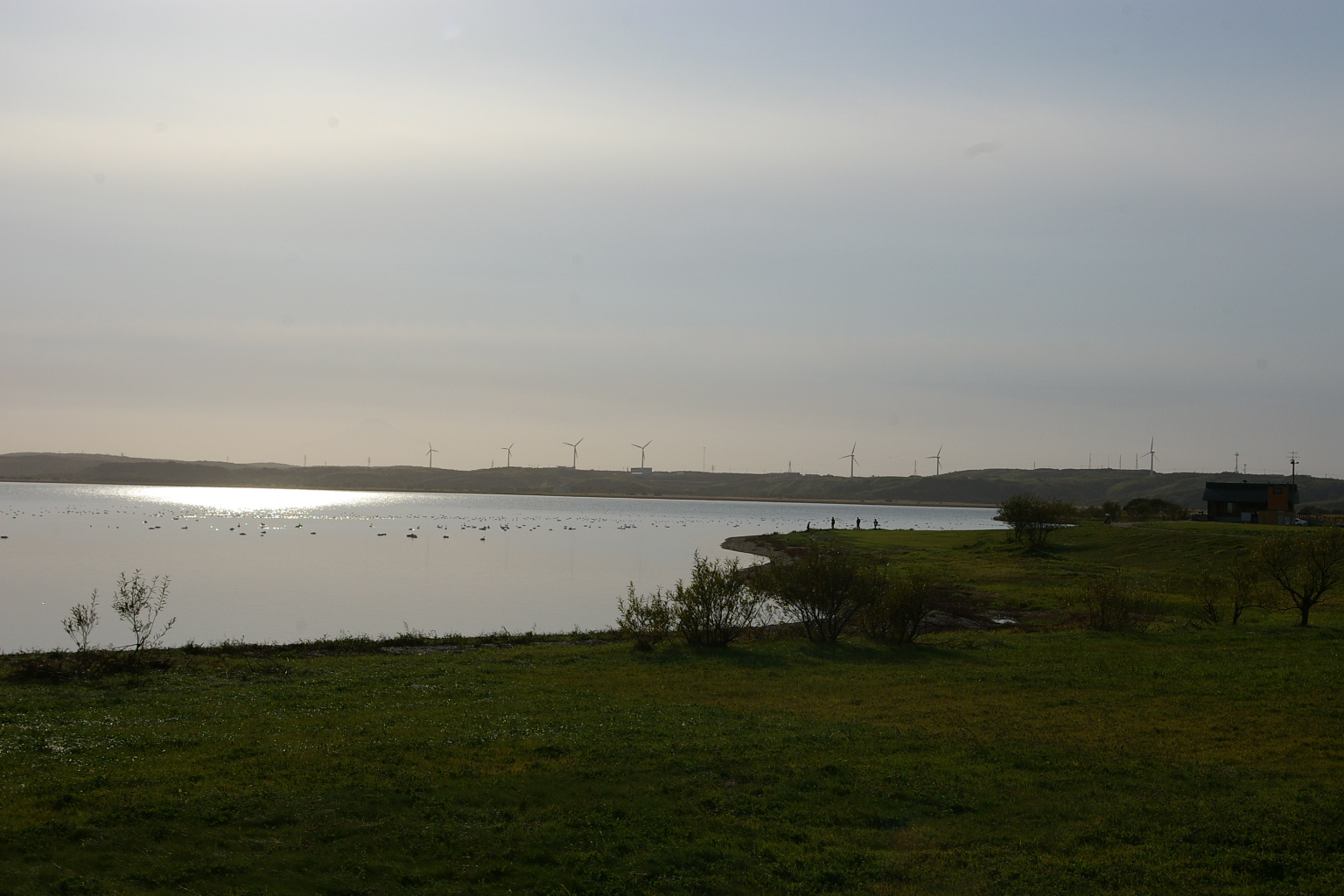
Onuma

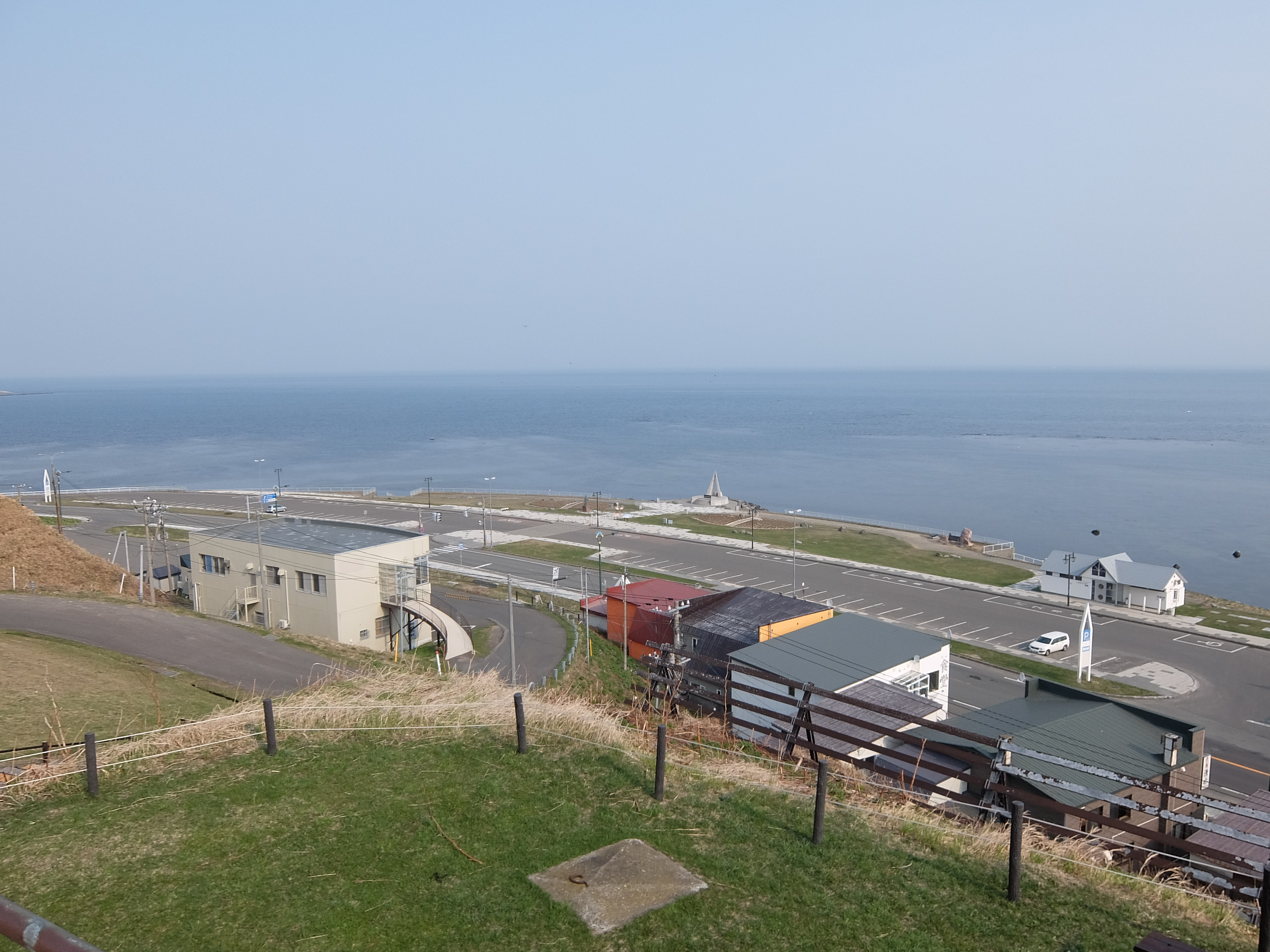
Cape Sōya

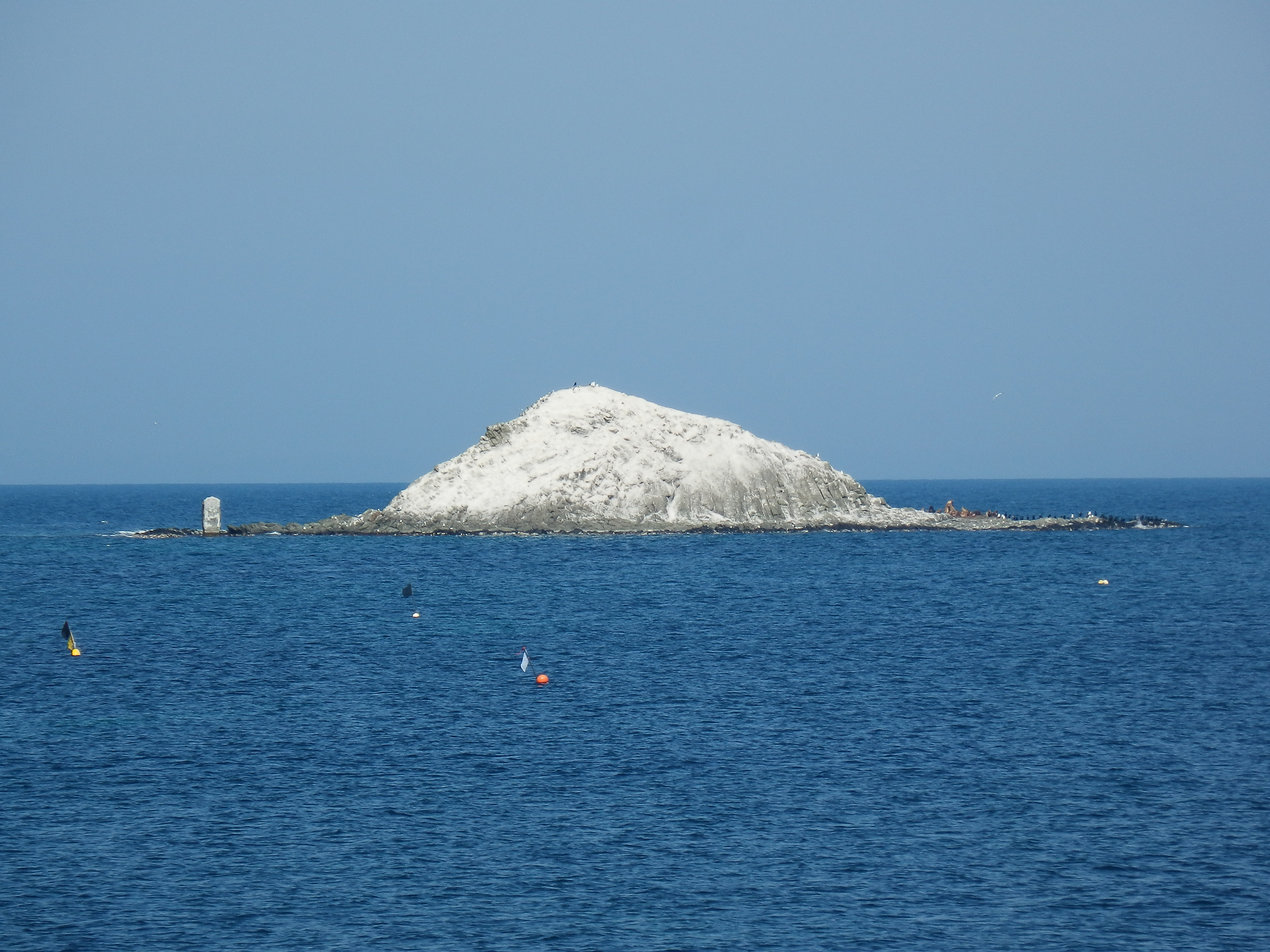
Bentenjima

== Climate ==
Wakkanai has a humid continental climate (Köppen: Dfb) typical of Hokkaido but with strong influence of the ocean as island portions near the great land masses (such as the smaller islands of Nova Scotia), with cold winters, warm summers and generally heavy precipitation from the Aleutian Low, whose winds hit the city direct from the Sea of Japan but with strong oceanic influence (46 °F). The winter is cold enough not to fall in a maritime climate (Cfb) and the summers although very mild for typical climate is warm enough not to fall into a subarctic climate (Dfc), both in the classification of Koppen. The mean annual temperature, at 6.8 °C (44.2 °F), is the second lowest for a significant population centre in Japan after Nemuro. Snowfall at 6.6 metres (260 in), the third highest for a big city in Japan after Asahikawa and Aomori and one of the highest anywhere in the world. For comparison, Nain in Canada receives 187 inches (4.7 m) of snow.

The Aleutian Low also makes the sunshine hours the lowest of Japan's major population centres and in the winter the wind speeds are the highest in Japan with an average of 20.2 km/h (12.6 mph), which adds to the −4.7 °C (23.5 °F) cold of a typical winter day.

The highest temperature ever recorded in Wakkanai was 32.7 °C (90.9 °F) on 29 July 2021. The coldest temperature ever recorded was −19.4 °C (−2.9 °F) on 30 January 1944.

Climate data for Wakkanai (elevation 3 m, 1991–2020 normals, extremes 1938–present)
| Month | Jan | Feb | Mar | Apr | May | Jun | Jul | Aug | Sep | Oct | Nov | Dec | Year |
|---|---|---|---|---|---|---|---|---|---|---|---|---|---|
| Record high °C (°F) | 7.4 (45.3) | 10.6 (51.1) | 13.1 (55.6) | 20.4 (68.7) | 26.9 (80.4) | 26.8 (80.2) | 32.7 (90.9) | 31.6 (88.9) | 29.7 (85.5) | 23.5 (74.3) | 17.4 (63.3) | 11.5 (52.7) | 32.7 (90.9) |
| Mean maximum °C (°F) | 3.0 (37.4) | 4.1 (39.4) | 7.9 (46.2) | 14.9 (58.8) | 20.1 (68.2) | 22.6 (72.7) | 25.6 (78.1) | 26.5 (79.7) | 25.0 (77.0) | 19.6 (67.3) | 14.0 (57.2) | 6.7 (44.1) | 27.2 (81.0) |
| Mean daily maximum °C (°F) | −2.4 (27.7) | −2.0 (28.4) | 1.6 (34.9) | 7.4 (45.3) | 12.4 (54.3) | 16.1 (61.0) | 20.1 (68.2) | 22.3 (72.1) | 20.1 (68.2) | 14.1 (57.4) | 6.3 (43.3) | 0.0 (32.0) | 9.7 (49.5) |
| Daily mean °C (°F) | −4.3 (24.3) | −4.3 (24.3) | −0.6 (30.9) | 4.5 (40.1) | 9.1 (48.4) | 13.0 (55.4) | 17.2 (63.0) | 19.5 (67.1) | 17.2 (63.0) | 11.3 (52.3) | 3.8 (38.8) | −2.1 (28.2) | 7.0 (44.6) |
| Mean daily minimum °C (°F) | −6.4 (20.5) | −6.7 (19.9) | −3.1 (26.4) | 1.8 (35.2) | 6.3 (43.3) | 10.4 (50.7) | 14.9 (58.8) | 17.2 (63.0) | 14.4 (57.9) | 8.4 (47.1) | 1.3 (34.3) | −4.2 (24.4) | 4.5 (40.1) |
| Mean minimum °C (°F) | −11.5 (11.3) | −11.8 (10.8) | −8.6 (16.5) | −2.7 (27.1) | 1.4 (34.5) | 5.9 (42.6) | 10.4 (50.7) | 13.6 (56.5) | 9.1 (48.4) | 2.3 (36.1) | −5.7 (21.7) | −9.4 (15.1) | −12.5 (9.5) |
| Record low °C (°F) | −19.4 (−2.9) | −18.3 (−0.9) | −17.4 (0.7) | −8.0 (17.6) | −2.2 (28.0) | 2.1 (35.8) | 6.4 (43.5) | 8.9 (48.0) | 3.5 (38.3) | −4.4 (24.1) | −11.4 (11.5) | −16.0 (3.2) | −19.4 (−2.9) |
| Average precipitation mm (inches) | 84.6 (3.33) | 60.6 (2.39) | 55.1 (2.17) | 50.3 (1.98) | 68.1 (2.68) | 65.8 (2.59) | 100.9 (3.97) | 123.1 (4.85) | 136.7 (5.38) | 129.7 (5.11) | 121.4 (4.78) | 112.9 (4.44) | 1,109.2 (43.67) |
| Average snowfall cm (inches) | 129 (51) | 105 (41) | 68 (27) | 9 (3.5) | 0 (0) | 0 (0) | 0 (0) | 0 (0) | 0 (0) | 1 (0.4) | 41 (16) | 122 (48) | 477 (188) |
| Average precipitation days (≥ 0.5 mm) | 23.8 | 20.0 | 16.3 | 11.3 | 10.8 | 10.2 | 9.5 | 10.6 | 12.6 | 16.3 | 20.2 | 23.9 | 185.4 |
| Average snowy days | 30.4 | 26.0 | 24.3 | 12.6 | 2.1 | 0.0 | 0.0 | 0.0 | 0.0 | 3.8 | 20.5 | 28.5 | 147.9 |
| Average relative humidity (%) | 72 | 71 | 70 | 75 | 79 | 85 | 87 | 84 | 75 | 68 | 67 | 70 | 75 |
| Mean monthly sunshine hours | 40.6 | 74.7 | 137.5 | 173.5 | 181.6 | 154.6 | 142.7 | 150.7 | 172.1 | 134.6 | 55.9 | 28.4 | 1,446.9 |
Source: Japan Meteorological Agency (normals: 1991–2020, extremes: 1938–present)

Climate data for Sōya-misaki, Wakkanai (elevation 26 m, 1991–2020 normals, extremes 1978–present)
| Month | Jan | Feb | Mar | Apr | May | Jun | Jul | Aug | Sep | Oct | Nov | Dec | Year |
|---|---|---|---|---|---|---|---|---|---|---|---|---|---|
| Record high °C (°F) | 5.7 (42.3) | 9.8 (49.6) | 15.2 (59.4) | 23.1 (73.6) | 26.0 (78.8) | 27.2 (81.0) | 30.4 (86.7) | 31.9 (89.4) | 29.7 (85.5) | 23.6 (74.5) | 17.5 (63.5) | 11.0 (51.8) | 31.9 (89.4) |
| Mean daily maximum °C (°F) | −2.6 (27.3) | −2.4 (27.7) | 1.0 (33.8) | 7.1 (44.8) | 11.7 (53.1) | 15.2 (59.4) | 19.0 (66.2) | 21.6 (70.9) | 19.6 (67.3) | 13.8 (56.8) | 6.1 (43.0) | 0.0 (32.0) | 9.2 (48.6) |
| Daily mean °C (°F) | −4.5 (23.9) | −4.6 (23.7) | −1.1 (30.0) | 3.9 (39.0) | 8.2 (46.8) | 11.9 (53.4) | 16.1 (61.0) | 18.7 (65.7) | 16.4 (61.5) | 10.8 (51.4) | 3.6 (38.5) | −2.1 (28.2) | 6.4 (43.5) |
| Mean daily minimum °C (°F) | −6.6 (20.1) | −7.1 (19.2) | −3.7 (25.3) | 0.8 (33.4) | 5.1 (41.2) | 9.2 (48.6) | 13.7 (56.7) | 16.2 (61.2) | 13.4 (56.1) | 7.6 (45.7) | 1.0 (33.8) | −4.4 (24.1) | 3.8 (38.8) |
| Record low °C (°F) | −16.3 (2.7) | −17.1 (1.2) | −14.9 (5.2) | −6.3 (20.7) | −1.5 (29.3) | 1.7 (35.1) | 5.7 (42.3) | 10.2 (50.4) | 5.0 (41.0) | −0.7 (30.7) | −10.0 (14.0) | −11.8 (10.8) | −17.1 (1.2) |
| Average precipitation mm (inches) | 23.5 (0.93) | 18.4 (0.72) | 21.5 (0.85) | 31.0 (1.22) | 58.0 (2.28) | 58.8 (2.31) | 106.3 (4.19) | 126.5 (4.98) | 123.8 (4.87) | 114.6 (4.51) | 94.4 (3.72) | 54.0 (2.13) | 836.4 (32.93) |
| Average precipitation days (≥ 1.0 mm) | 8.9 | 7.3 | 7.3 | 7.1 | 8.6 | 8.5 | 9.1 | 9.5 | 11.2 | 13.6 | 15.1 | 13.8 | 120.1 |
| Mean monthly sunshine hours | 49.9 | 91.5 | 156.0 | 187.1 | 177.9 | 142.0 | 123.1 | 153.1 | 179.2 | 141.7 | 61.0 | 29.0 | 1,490.5 |
Source: Japan Meteorological Agency

Climate data for Numakawa, Wakkanai (elevation 23 m, 1991–2020 normals, extremes 1977–present)
| Month | Jan | Feb | Mar | Apr | May | Jun | Jul | Aug | Sep | Oct | Nov | Dec | Year |
|---|---|---|---|---|---|---|---|---|---|---|---|---|---|
| Record high °C (°F) | 7.5 (45.5) | 9.9 (49.8) | 13.9 (57.0) | 24.7 (76.5) | 26.1 (79.0) | 29.2 (84.6) | 32.4 (90.3) | 31.9 (89.4) | 31.3 (88.3) | 23.9 (75.0) | 17.2 (63.0) | 11.1 (52.0) | 32.4 (90.3) |
| Mean daily maximum °C (°F) | −3.2 (26.2) | −2.6 (27.3) | 1.4 (34.5) | 7.7 (45.9) | 14.0 (57.2) | 17.7 (63.9) | 21.6 (70.9) | 23.1 (73.6) | 20.4 (68.7) | 13.9 (57.0) | 5.6 (42.1) | −0.9 (30.4) | 9.9 (49.8) |
| Daily mean °C (°F) | −6.9 (19.6) | −6.9 (19.6) | −2.5 (27.5) | 3.5 (38.3) | 8.9 (48.0) | 12.9 (55.2) | 17.1 (62.8) | 18.7 (65.7) | 15.0 (59.0) | 8.8 (47.8) | 1.9 (35.4) | −4.1 (24.6) | 5.6 (42.1) |
| Mean daily minimum °C (°F) | −12.3 (9.9) | −13.4 (7.9) | −8.1 (17.4) | −1.2 (29.8) | 3.8 (38.8) | 8.3 (46.9) | 13.0 (55.4) | 14.4 (57.9) | 8.9 (48.0) | 2.9 (37.2) | −2.2 (28.0) | −8.2 (17.2) | 0.5 (32.9) |
| Record low °C (°F) | −34.0 (−29.2) | −34.4 (−29.9) | −29.0 (−20.2) | −15.2 (4.6) | −8.1 (17.4) | −2.6 (27.3) | 1.0 (33.8) | 1.5 (34.7) | −1.5 (29.3) | −7.2 (19.0) | −14.1 (6.6) | −25.6 (−14.1) | −34.4 (−29.9) |
| Average precipitation mm (inches) | 89.2 (3.51) | 66.5 (2.62) | 59.0 (2.32) | 52.5 (2.07) | 66.1 (2.60) | 60.5 (2.38) | 109.1 (4.30) | 125.5 (4.94) | 128.6 (5.06) | 142.0 (5.59) | 130.6 (5.14) | 117.9 (4.64) | 1,147.5 (45.18) |
| Average snowfall cm (inches) | 204 (80) | 160 (63) | 111 (44) | 29 (11) | 1 (0.4) | 0 (0) | 0 (0) | 0 (0) | 0 (0) | 2 (0.8) | 69 (27) | 204 (80) | 777 (306) |
| Average precipitation days (≥ 1.0 mm) | 21.8 | 17.9 | 14.8 | 10.7 | 10.0 | 9.0 | 9.8 | 10.3 | 12.4 | 15.5 | 18.8 | 22.2 | 173.3 |
| Mean monthly sunshine hours | 35.9 | 61.8 | 117.5 | 144.8 | 162.6 | 134.0 | 117.1 | 132.2 | 162.8 | 127.3 | 56.0 | 26.5 | 1,278.5 |
Source: Japan Meteorological Agency

== Demographics ==
Per Japanese census data, the population of Wakkanai is as shown below.

Historical population
| Year | Pop. | ±% |
|---|---|---|
| 1940 | 25,375 | — |
| 1950 | 38,819 | +53.0% |
| 1960 | 51,113 | +31.7% |
| 1970 | 54,493 | +6.6% |
| 1980 | 53,471 | −1.9% |
| 1990 | 48,232 | −9.8% |
| 2000 | 43,774 | −9.2% |
| 2010 | 39,601 | −9.5% |
| 2020 | 33,563 | −15.2% |

As of today, most of Wakkanai's residents are ethnic Japanese and can speak Japanese. However, smaller fractions of them tend to have Russian ancestry, due to the proximity between Wakkanai and Russia, who can speak Russian depending on how well Russian is taught in different households. Additionally, in even smaller numbers, there are also Ainu people or individuals of partial Ainu ancestry living in Wakkanai (see History above).

== Government ==
Wakkanai has a mayor-council form of government with a directly elected mayor and a unicameral city council of 18 members. Wakkanai contributes one member to the Hokkaido Legislative Assembly. In terms of national politics, the city is part of the Hokkaido 12th district of the lower house of the Diet of Japan.

== Economy ==
Wakkanai city's core industries are fisheries, agriculture, and tourism. As the largest city north of Asahikawa, it is home to regional branches of national institutions such as the Japan Coast Guard, the Self-Defense Forces, the local tax office, the courts, and the district prosecutor's office, as well as the Soya General Bureau. Tourism is facilitated in the local area via fisheries and monuments, as well as with ferries to the nearby offshore islands (see Seaports below). There are multiple fishing ports which specialize in deep sea fishing and marine products. Marine products are sold in the Kita market and Fukko market located in the city.

== Education ==
Wakkanai has nine public elementary schools, five public middle schools, and one combined elementary/middle school operated by the city government and one public high school (Hokkaido Wakkanai High School) operated by the Hokkaido Board of Education. There is also one private high school and one special education school, the Hokkaido Wakkanai Special Needs School, operated by the Hokkaido government.

Ikueikan University, formerly known as Wakkanai Hokusei Gakuen University, is located in the city.

== Transportation ==
=== Airport ===
Wakkanai Airport is located east of central Wakkanai near the beginning of National Route 238. There are flights operated twice a day to New Chitose Airport near Sapporo as well as a single daily flight to Tokyo's Haneda Airport, both operated by ANA. During particularly strong winter months, if the weather is unfavorable, flights are often diverted to nearby Asahikawa Airport, 155 miles (249 km) south of Wakkanai.

=== Railway ===
JR Hokkaido - Sōya Main Line

■ Wakkanai - Minami-Wakkanai - Yūchi

The Soya Main Line previously served Bakkai, but it was closed in 2024.

The Sōya limited express runs once a day to and from Sapporo, while the Sarobetsu runs twice a day to and from Asahikawa, with a change of trains to either a Lilac or Kamui limited express service at Asahikawa required to reach Sapporo.

=== Highways ===
- National Route 40
- National Route 238

=== Seaports ===
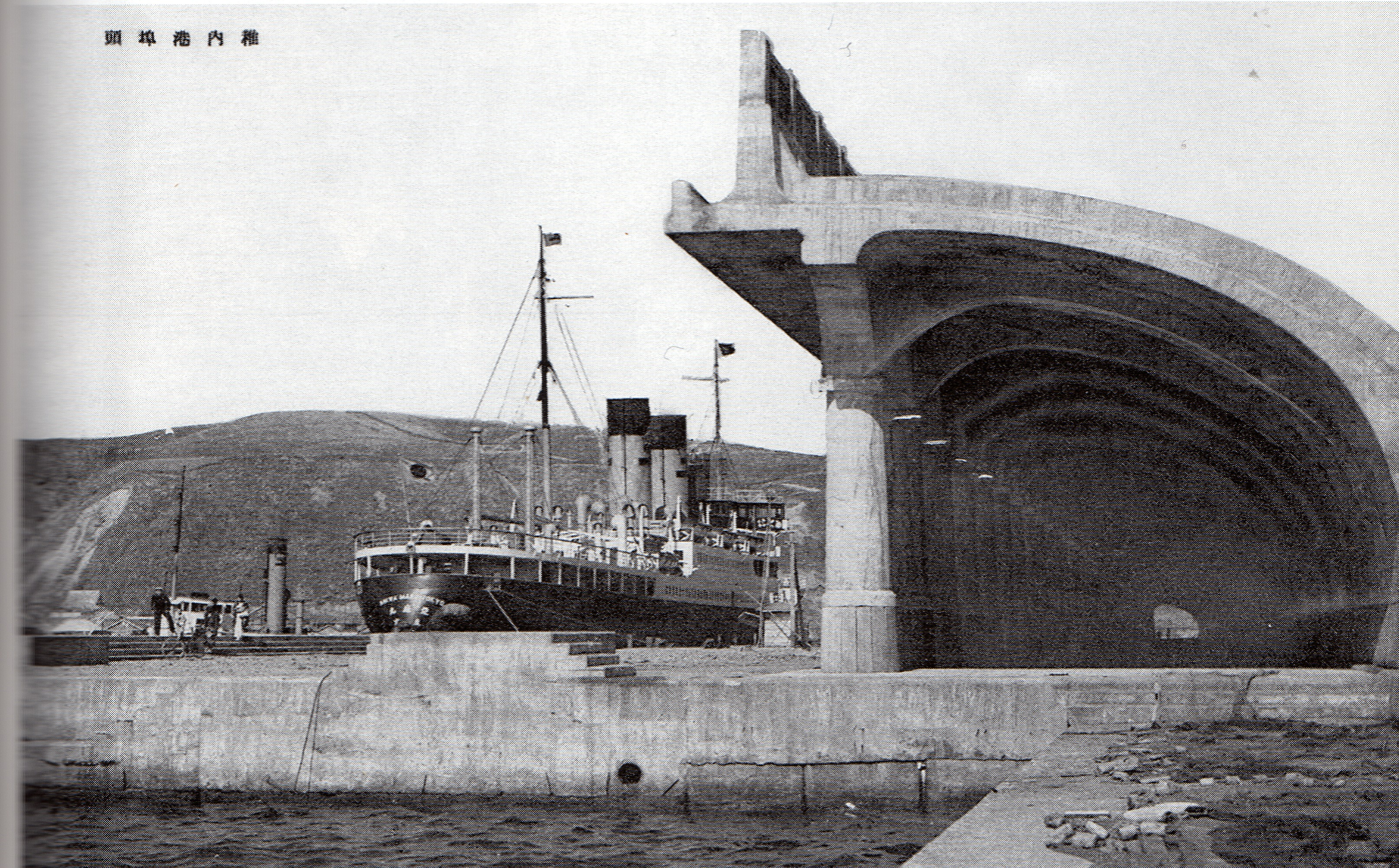
Chihaku ferry "Aniwamaru" of Japanese Governmental Railway, touching down the north pier of Wakkanai port. Chihaku ferry had connected Wakkanai in Hokkaido and Odomari in Sakhalin, until the ferry ceased its operation in 1945.

Heartland Ferry operates seasonal ferry service to Rebun Island and Rishiri Island. Ferry service to Korsakov on Sakhalin Island was terminated on September 18, 2015. Wakkanai mayor Hiroshi Kudo pledged to restore ferry service to Sakhalin and in 2016, the route resumed operation between the months of June and September. It was commercially operated by the Commonwealth of Dominica flagged vessel Penguin 33, which is a high-speed craft owned by Penguin International Limited and operated by Sakhalin Shipping Company. The route was suspended for passengers in 2019, and efforts to reintroduce service ended in 2022.

== Sister City and Friendship Cities ==
=== Sister City ===
- Baguio, Philippines (since 1973)

=== Friendship cities ===
==== Domestic ====
- (Japan) Ishigaki, Okinawa (since 1987)
- (Japan) Makurazaki, Kagoshima (since 2012)

==== International ====
- Nevelsk, Russia (since 1972)
- Korsakov, Russia (since 1992)
- Yuzhno-Sakhalinsk, Russia (since 2001)
- Hengchun, Pingtung County, Taiwan (since 2023)

=== Sister Port ===
- Port of Anchorage, United States (since 1982)

== Local attractions ==
- The Daisuke Matsuzaka Museum, dedicated to the baseball pitcher "Dice-K" and opened in 2008, is located in Wakkanai, which is his father's hometown.
- Wakkanai Park, home to the Centennial Tower, commemorating the 100th anniversary of the founding of the city, and the Hoppo Memorial Museum
- Cape Sōya, home to a monument to the northernmost point in Japan
- Hokumon Jinja, a Shinto shrine
- Wakkanai Onsen Dome, Japan's northernmost onsen.

== Mascots ==
Rinzou-kun and Dashinosuke, the city's mascots

Wakkanai's mascots are Rinzou-kun (りんぞうくん) and Dashinosuke (出汁之介).

- Rinzou-kun is a descendant of Mamiya Rinzō who explored the Strait of Tartary in what is now Russia.
- Dashinosuke is a green harbor seal who is Rinzou-kun's assistant. His flippers and his tail resemble kelp.

== See also ==
- Shiranushi
