= Nagayama Station (Hokkaido) =

Railway station in Asahikawa, Hokkaido, Japan

Nagayama Station 永山駅
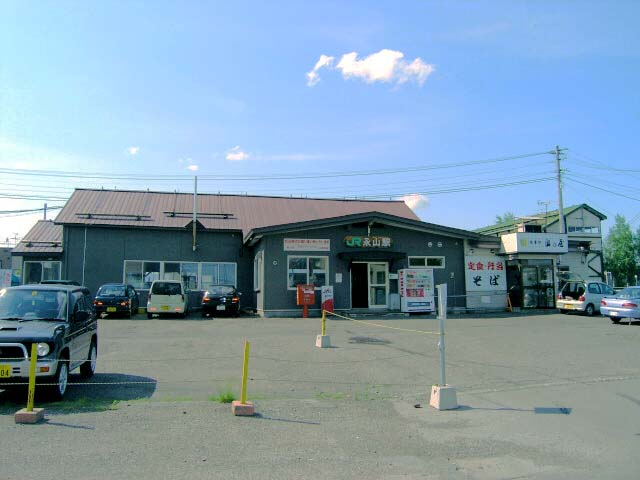

General information
- Location: 1-jō 19-chōme Nagayama, Asahikawa, Hokkaido （北海道旭川市永山1条19丁目） Japan
- Coordinates: 43.8141°N 142.4344°E
- Operator: JR Hokkaido
- Line: Sōya Main Line

Other information
- Station code: W31
Location

Nagayama Station (永山駅, Nagayama-eki) is a railway station in Asahikawa, Hokkaidō, Japan, operated by the Hokkaido Railway Company (JR Hokkaido).

== Lines ==
Nagayama Station is served by the Sōya Main Line from Asahikawa to Wakkanai, and is located 9.3 km from Asahikawa.

== Adjacent stations ==
«	Service	»
Sōya Main Line
Limited Express Sōya: Does not stop at this station
Limited Express Sarobetsu: Does not stop at this station
Asahikawa	Rapid Nayoro No. 1, 4, 5, 6, 7, 8	Pippu
Asahikawa-Yojō	Rapid Nayoro No. 2, 3	Pippu
Shin-Asahikawa	Local	Kita-Nagayama

== Surrounding area ==
- National Route 39
- Asahikawa University
- Asahikawa University Junior College
- Asahikawa University High School
- Nagayama Shrine
