= Shiokari Station =

Railway station in Wassamu, Hokkaido, Japan

W37 Shiokari Station 塩狩駅
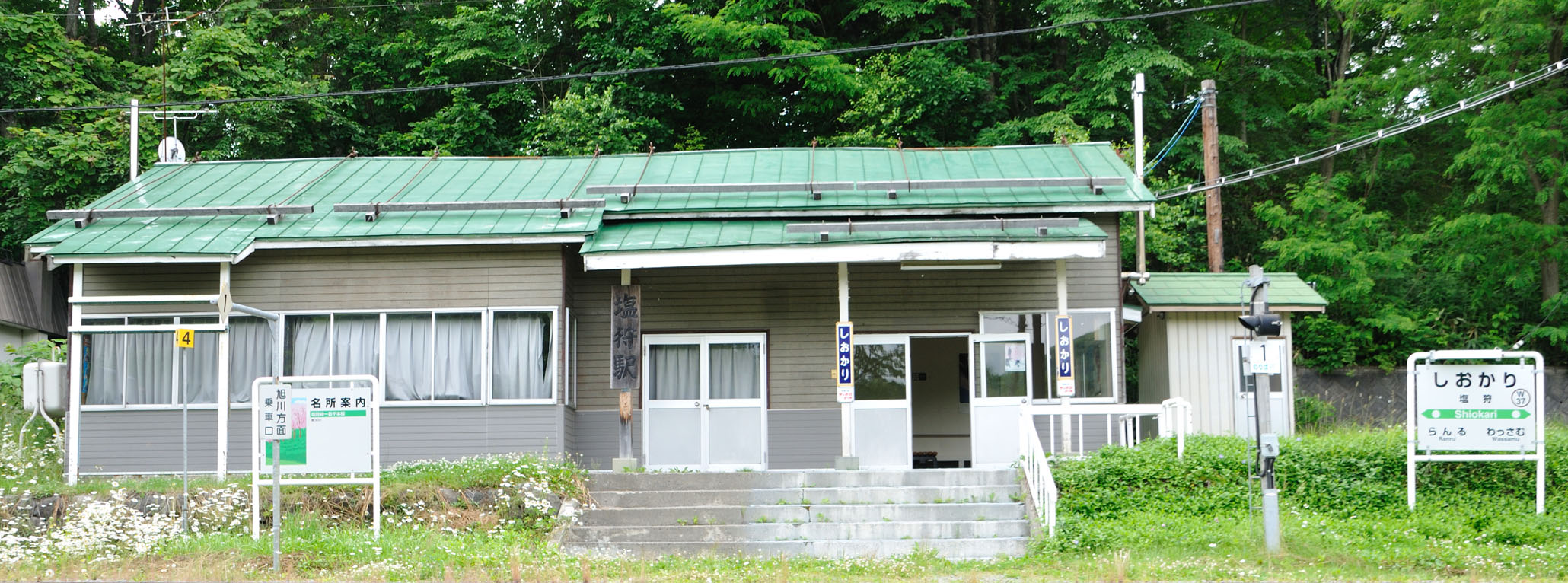
- Shiokari Station

General information
- Location: Shiokari, Wassamu, Kamikawa-gun, Hokkaido 098-0125; Japan
- Coordinates: 43°58′3.5″N 142°27′17″E
- System: regional rail
- Operator: JR Hokkaido
- Line: Sōya Main Line
- Distance: 28.4 km (17.6 mi) from Asahikawa
- Platforms: 2 side platforms
- Train operators: JR Hokkaido

Construction
- Structure type: At grade

Other information
- Status: Unattended
- Station code: W38
- Website: Official website

History
- Opened: 25 November 1924
- Former names: passengers = >10

Services
Preceding station	JR Hokkaido	Following station
Wassamu towards Wakkanai	Sōya Main Line Local	Ranru towards Asahikawa
Wassamu towards Wakkanai	Sōya Main Line Limited Express Nayoro No. 4	Pippu towards Asahikawa
Wassamu towards Wakkanai	Sōya Main Line Limited Express Nayoro No. 2, 5	Ranru towards Asahikawa
Location
- Location within Hokkaido Location within Japan

Shiokari Station (塩狩駅, Shiokari-eki) is a railway station located in the Shiokari neighborhood of the town of Wassamu, Kamikawa-gun, Hokkaidō, Japan. It is operated by JR Hokkaido.

== Lines ==
The station is served by the 259.4 km (161.2 mi) Soya Main Line from Asahikawa to Wakkanai and is located 28.4 km from the starting point of the line at Asahikawa.

== Layout ==
The station is an above-ground station with two opposed staggered side platforms and two tracks. The platforms are connected by a level crossing. The station is unattended.

=== Platforms ===
1	■ Sōya Main Line	for Nayoro and Wakkanai
1, 2	■ Sōya Main Line	for Asahikawa and Sapporo

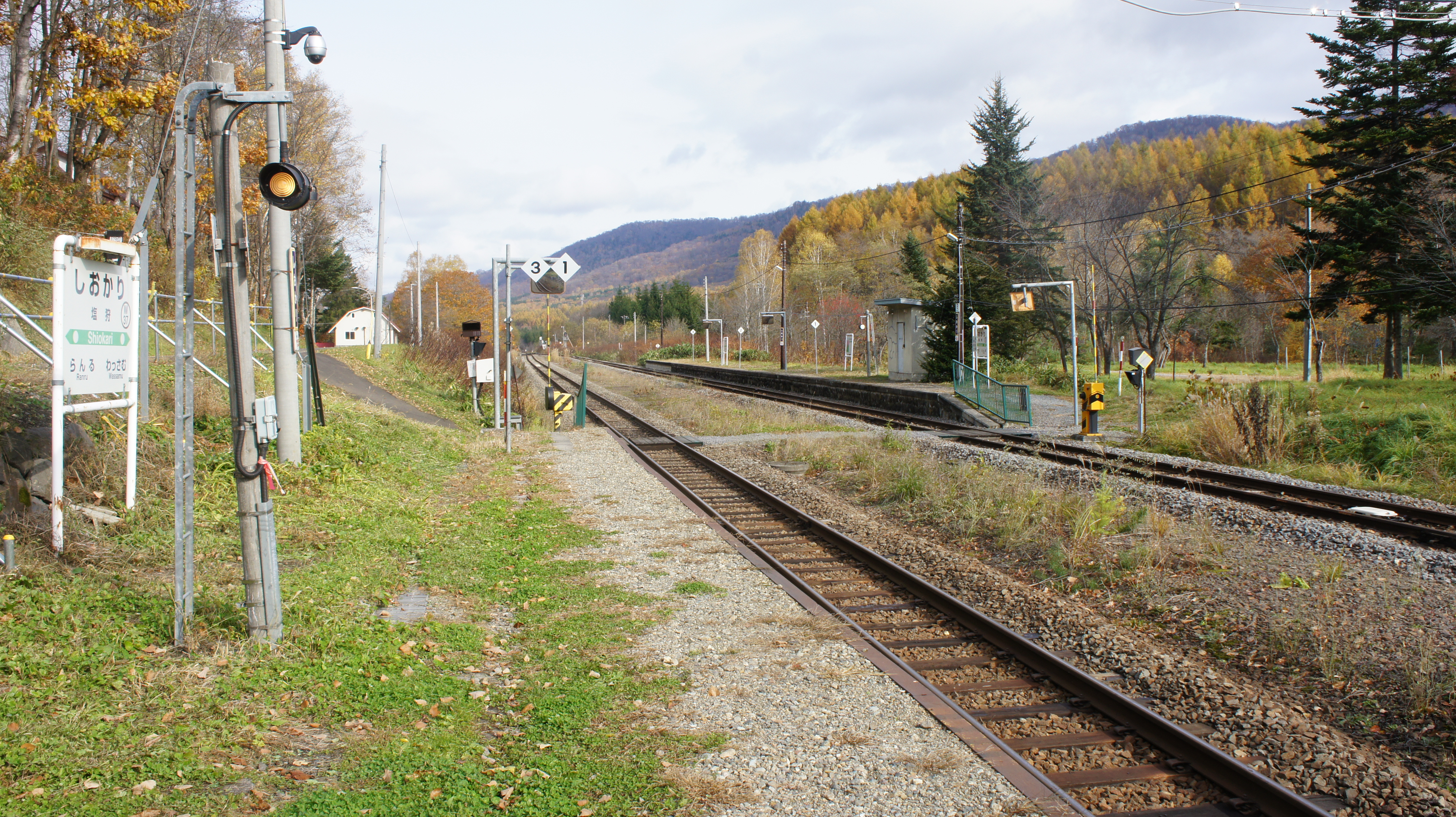
Platform

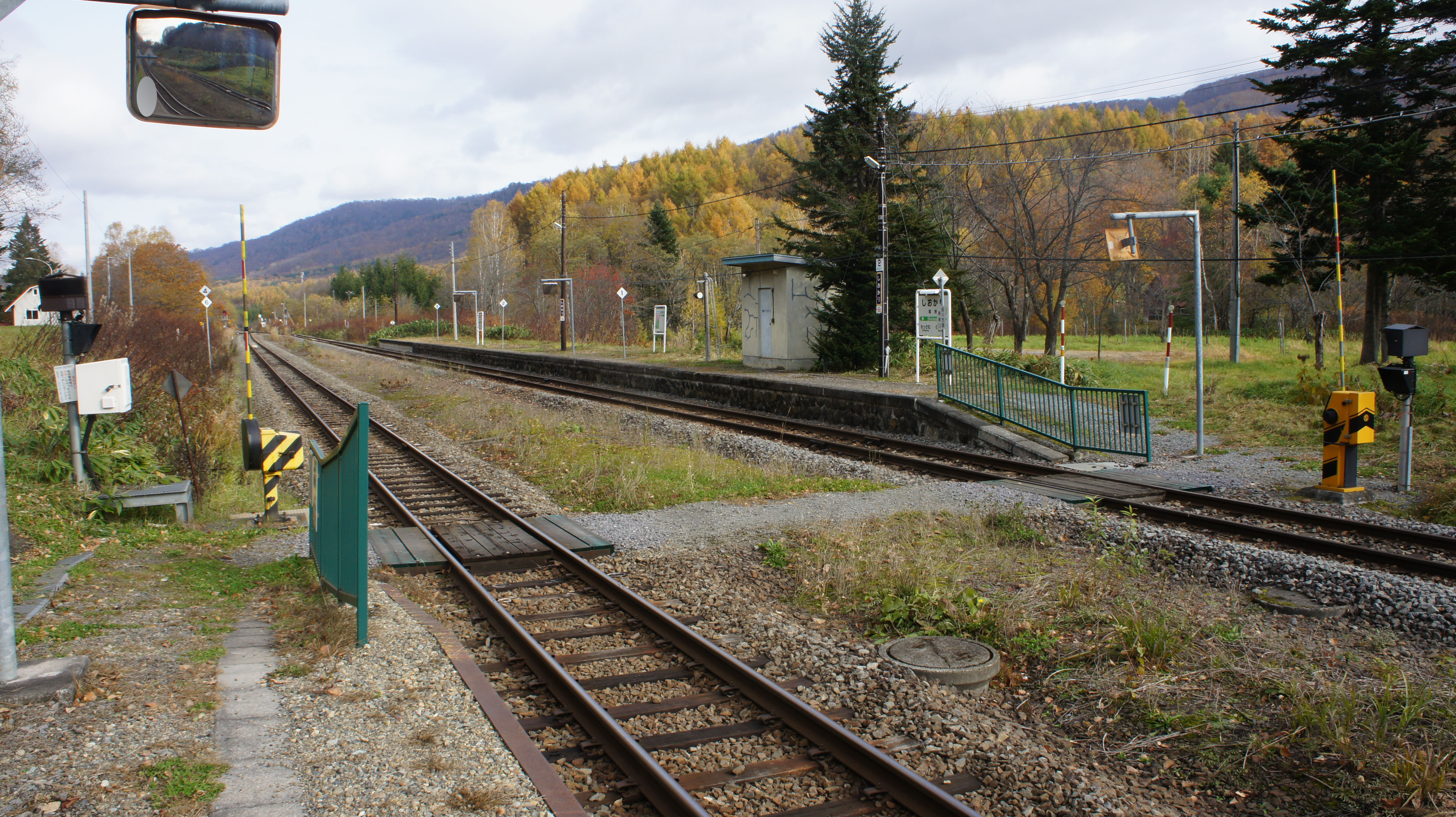
Level crossing

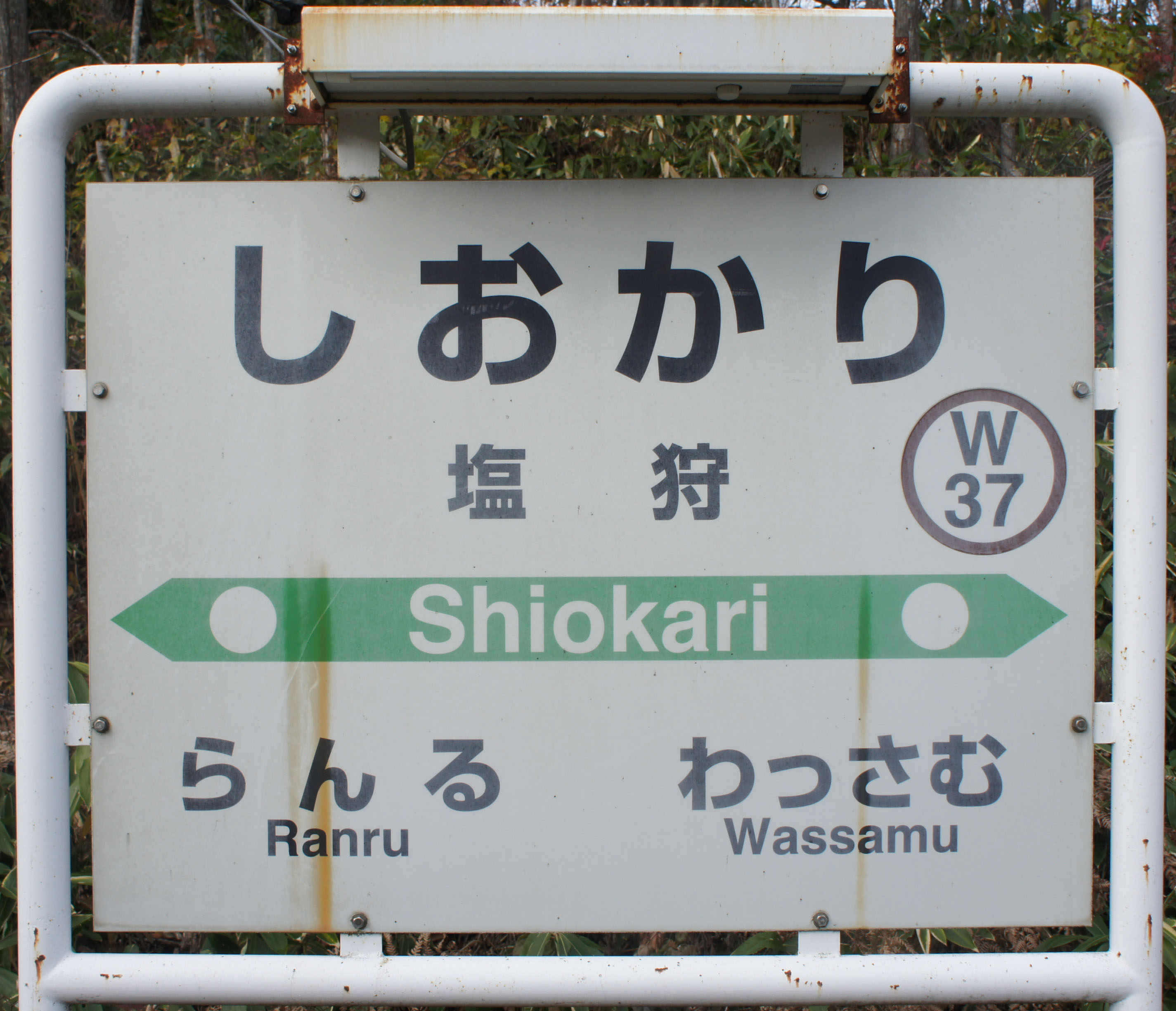
Signboard

== History ==
The station began as the Shiokari Signal Station on 5 September 1916, and was upgraded to Shiokari Signal Station on 1 April 1922. On 25 November 1924, it was upgraded to a full passenger station. With the privatization of Japanese National Railways (JNR) on 1 April 1987, the station came under the control of JR Hokkaido. On 3 December 2019 JR Hokkaido requested local governments along the line, through the Soya Main Line Revitalization Promotion Council, to report by March 2020 on whether to maintain and manage 29 stations, including this one, by covering the costs, or it would close the stations in March 2021. In April 2022, the station was transferred to Wassamu Town, with maintenance costs now largely covered by donations.

== Passenger statistics ==
During fiscal 2019, the station was used on average by under ten passengers daily.

== Surrounding area ==
- Japan National Route 40
- Shiokari Pass Memorial Hall

== See also ==
- List of railway stations in Japan
