= Kembuchi Station =

Railway station in Kenbuchi, Hokkaido, Japan

W40 Kembuchi Station 剣淵駅
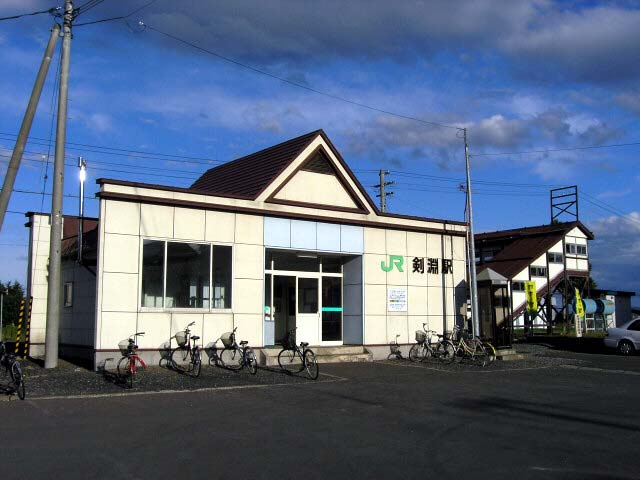
- Kembuchi Station in 2017

General information
- Location: 2 Nakamachi, Kembuchi, Kamikawa-gun, Hokkaido 098-0338; Japan
- Coordinates: 44°5′47″N 142°21′52″E
- System: regional rail
- Operator: JR Hokkaido
- Line: Sōya Main Line
- Distance: 45.2 km (28.1 mi) from Asahikawa
- Platforms: 2 side platforms
- Train operators: JR Hokkaido

Construction
- Structure type: At grade

Other information
- Status: Unattended
- Station code: W40
- Website: Official website

History
- Opened: 5 August 1900

Passengers
- FY2019: 92

Services
Preceding station	JR Hokkaido	Following station
Shibetsu towards Wakkanai	Sōya Main Line Local	Wassamu towards Asahikawa
Location
- Location within Hokkaido Location within Japan

Kembuchi Station (剣淵駅, Kembuchi-eki) is a railway station located in the Nakamachi neighborhood of the town of Kenbuchi-chō, Kamikawa-gun, Hokkaidō, Japan. It is operated by JR Hokkaido.

== Lines ==
The station is served by the 259.4 km (161.2 mi) Soya Main Line from Asahikawa to Wakkanai and is located 45.2 km from the starting point of the line at Asahikawa.

== Layout ==
The station is an above-ground station with two side platforms and two tracks. Platform 1 on the west side is a single track through platform. Passengers can move between platforms using a footbridge. The station is unattended, but also houses a bus terminal managed by Kenbuchi Town, and a tourist product center where local products are on display.

=== Platforms ===
1	■ Sōya Main Line	for Nayoro
2	■ Sōya Main Line	for Asahikawa

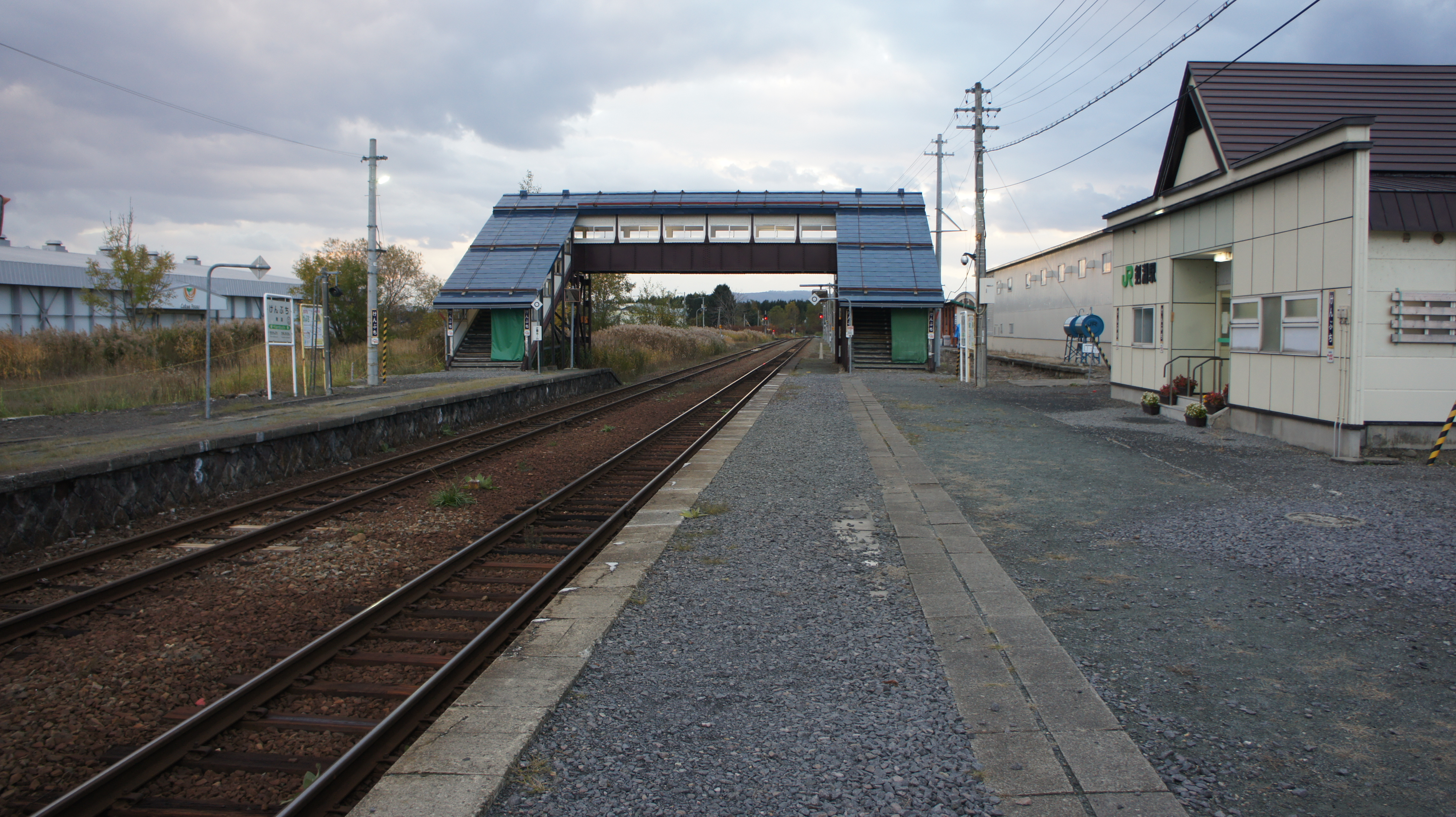
Platform

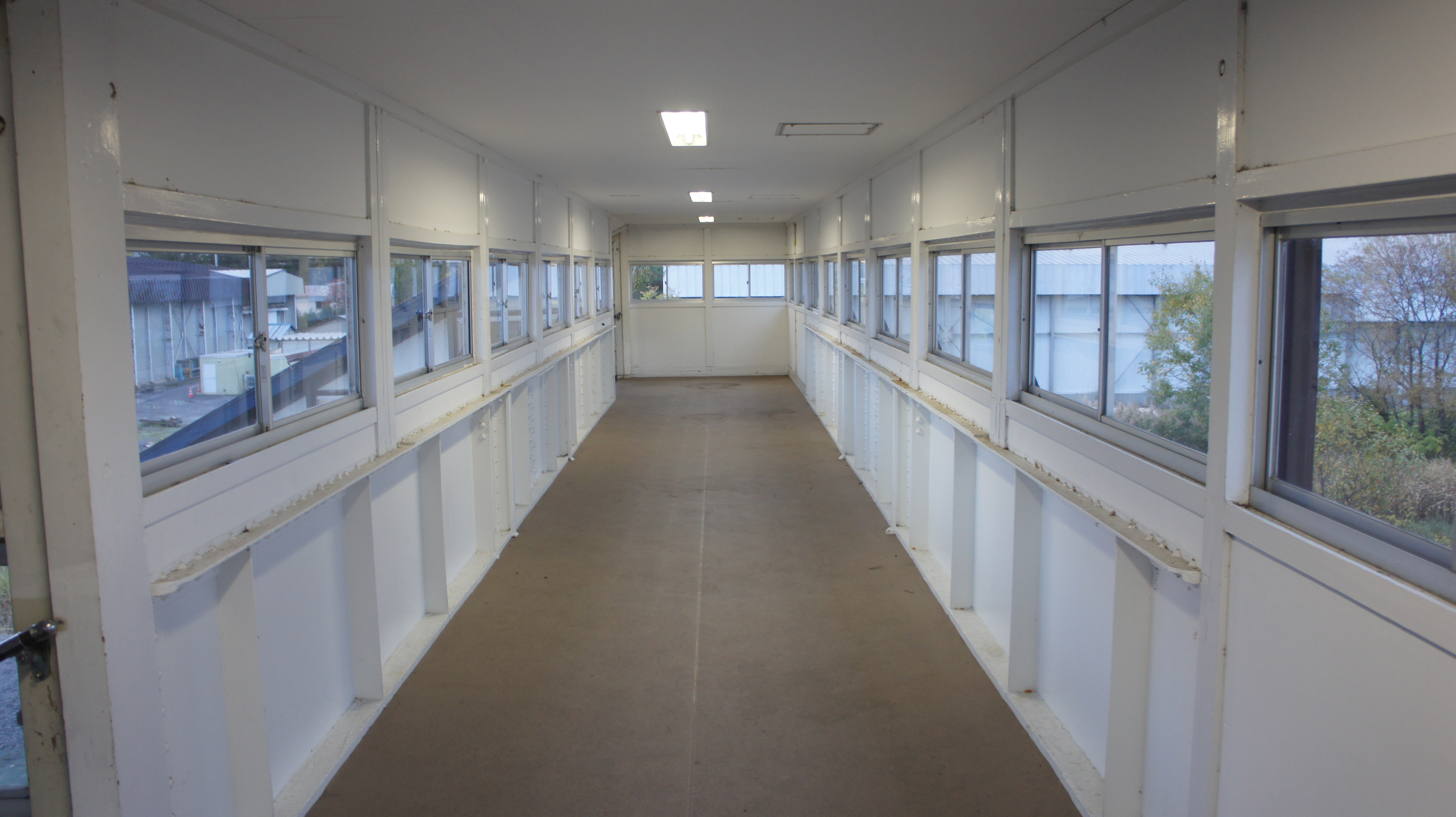
Footbridge

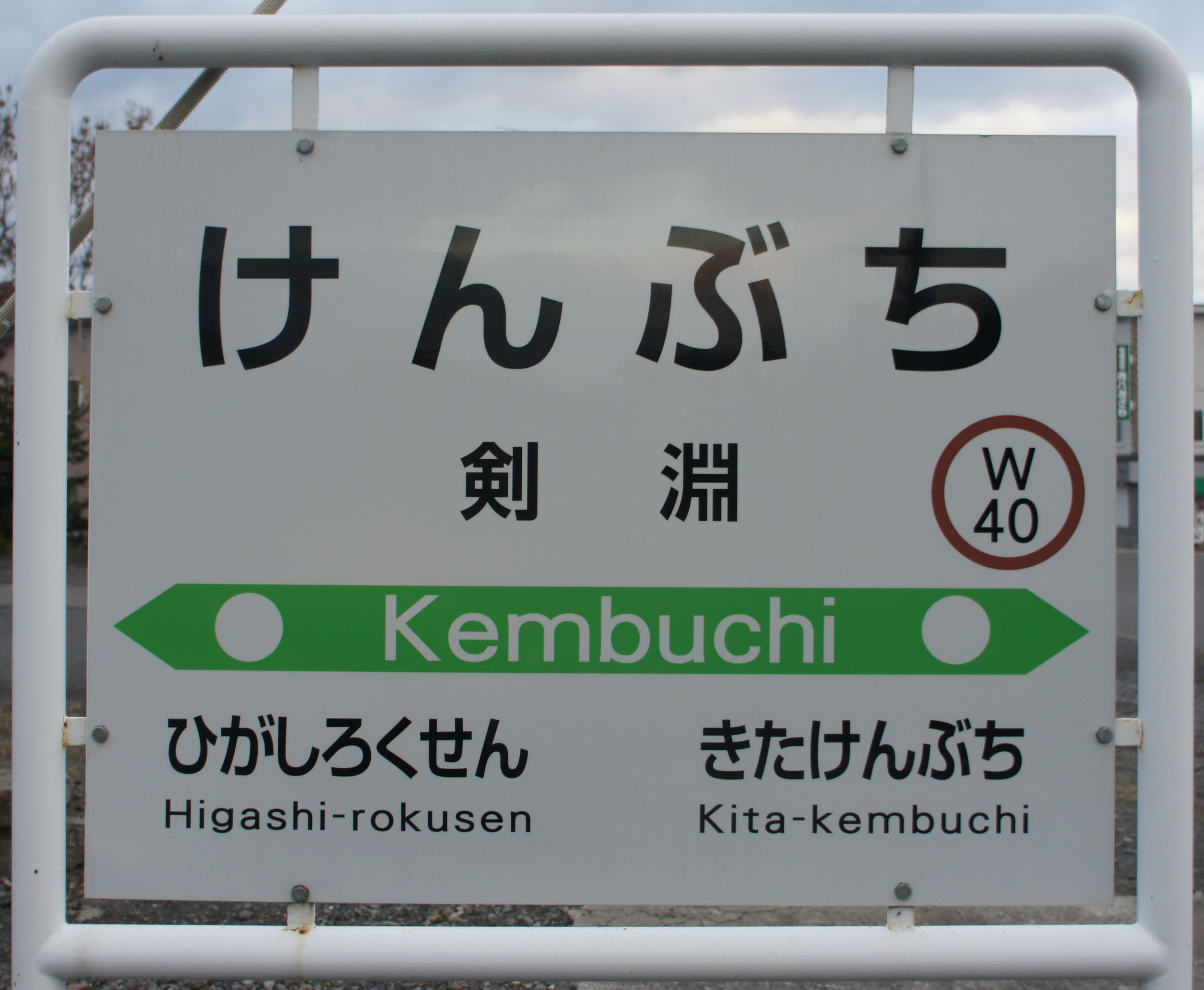
Signboard

== History ==
The station was opened as on 5 August 1900 with the extension of the Hokkaido Government Railway Teshio Line between Wassamu Station and Shibetsu Station. It was pronounced "Kenufuchi" until 1 April 1905. With the privatization of Japanese National Railways (JNR) on 1 April 1987, the station came under the control of JR Hokkaido. The station building was rebuilt in 1988.

== Passenger statistics ==
During fiscal 2019, the station was used on average by 92 passengers daily.

== Surrounding area ==
- Kenbuchi Town Office
- Kenbuchi Town Picture Book Museum

== See also ==
- List of railway stations in Japan
