= Wassamu Station =

Railway station in Wassamu, Hokkaido, Japan

W38 Wassamu Station 和寒駅
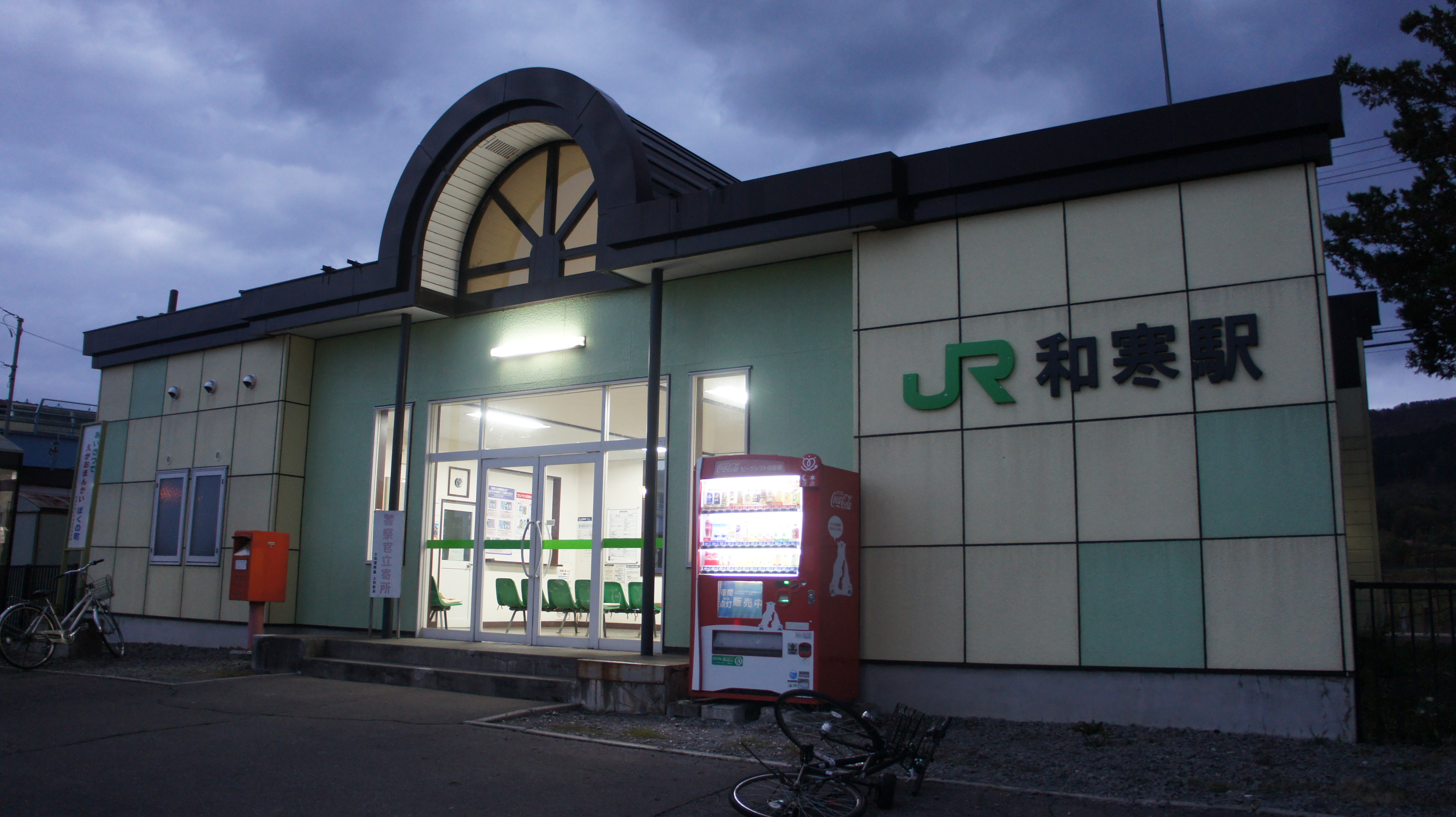
- Wassamu Station

General information
- Location: Minamimachi, Wassamu, Kamikawa-gun, Hokkaido 098-0131; Japan
- Coordinates: 44°1′36.5″N 142°24′55″E
- System: regional rail
- Operator: JR Hokkaido
- Line: Sōya Main Line
- Distance: 36.3 km (22.6 mi) from Asahikawa
- Platforms: 1 side + 1 island platforms
- Train operators: JR Hokkaido

Construction
- Structure type: At grade

Other information
- Status: Unattended
- Station code: W38
- Website: Official website

History
- Opened: 15 November 1899
- Former names: passengers = 88

Services
Preceding station	JR Hokkaido	Following station
Kembuchi towards Wakkanai	Sōya Main Line Local	Shiokari towards Asahikawa
Kembuchi towards Wakkanai	Sōya Main Line Limited Express Nayoro No. 1, 3, 6, 7, 8	Pippu towards Asahikawa
Kembuchi towards Wakkanai	Sōya Main Line Limited Express Nayoro No. 2, 4, 5	Shiokari towards Asahikawa
Shibetsu towards Wakkanai	Sōya Main Line Limited Express Sarobetsu	Asahikawa Terminus
Shibetsu towards Wakkanai	Sōya Main Line Limited Express Sōya	Asahikawa Terminus
Location
- Location within Hokkaido Location within Japan

Wassamu Station (和寒駅, Wassamu-eki) is a railway station located in the Kitamachi neighborhood of the town of Wassamu, Kamikawa-gun, Hokkaidō, Japan. It is operated by JR Hokkaido.

== Lines ==
The station is served by the 259.4 km (161.2 mi) Soya Main Line from Asahikawa to Wakkanai and is located 36.3 km from the starting point of the line at Asahikawa.

== Layout ==
The station is an above-ground station with one side platform and one island platform, connected by a footbridge. The wooden station building, built to JNR standards, was demolished, and the remodeled station building stands on the west side of the station. The station is unattended.

=== Platforms ===
1	■ Sōya Main Line	for Nayoro and Wakkanai
2, 3	■ Sōya Main Line	for Asahikawa and Sapporo

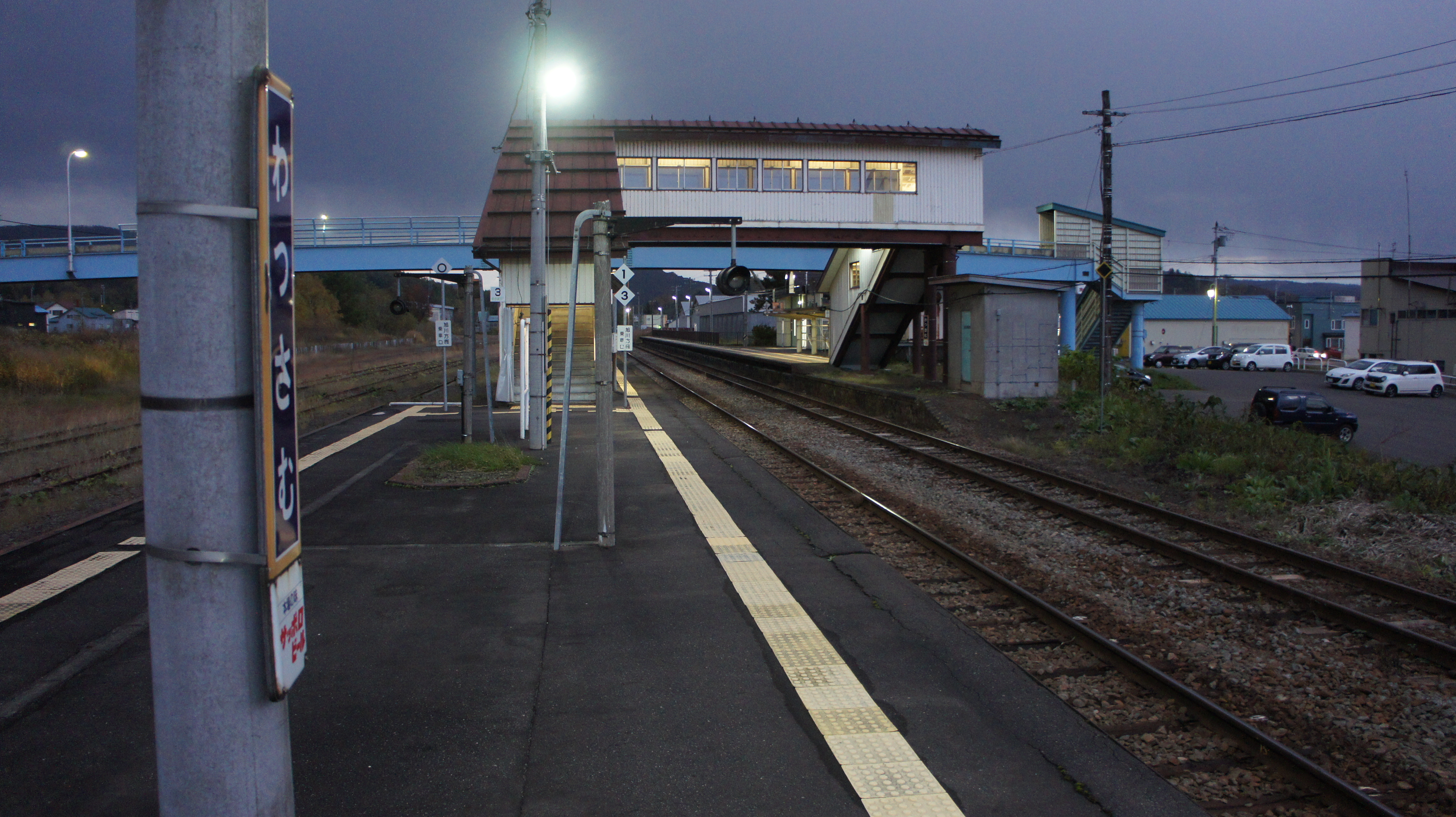
Platform

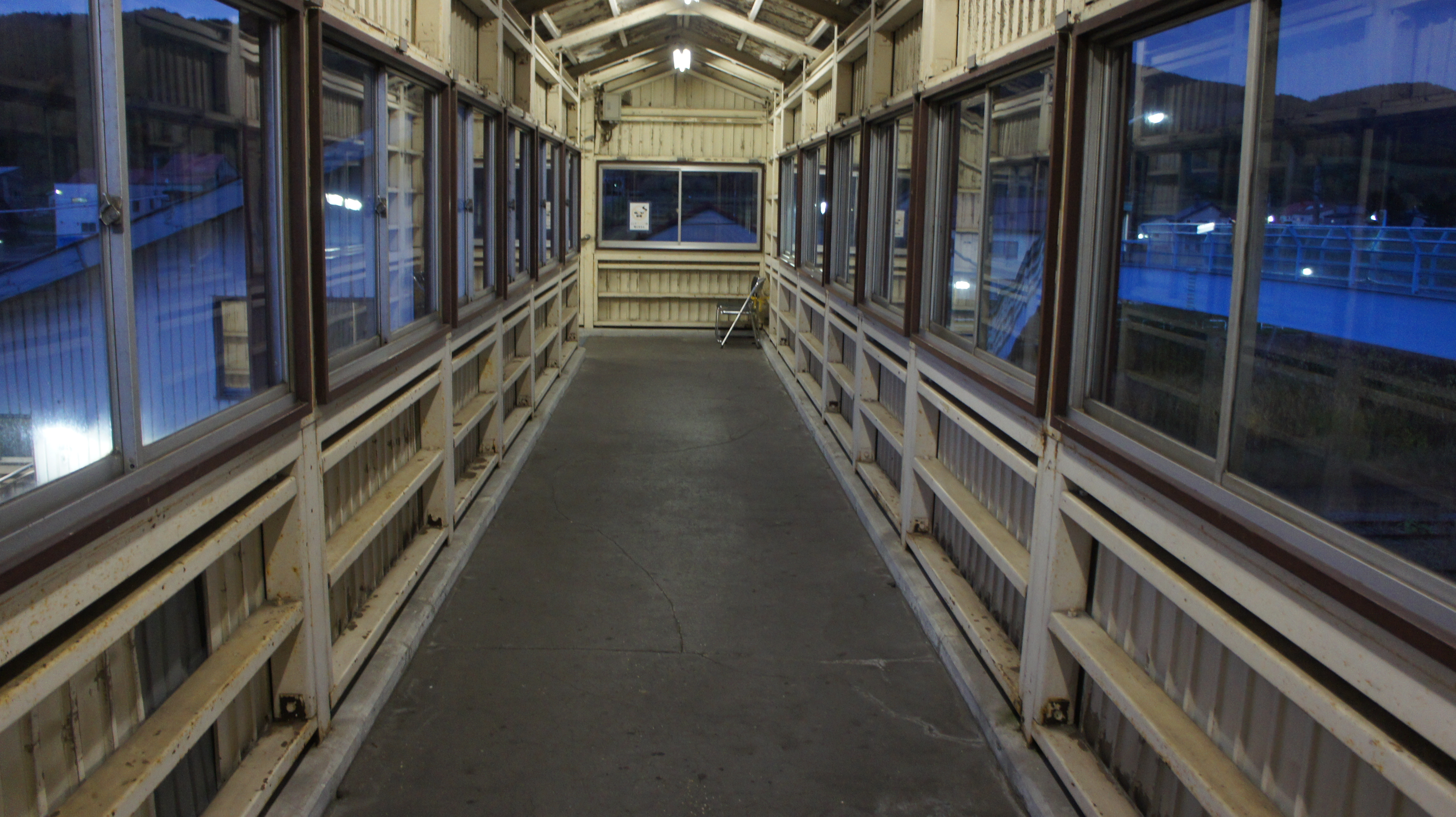
Footbridge

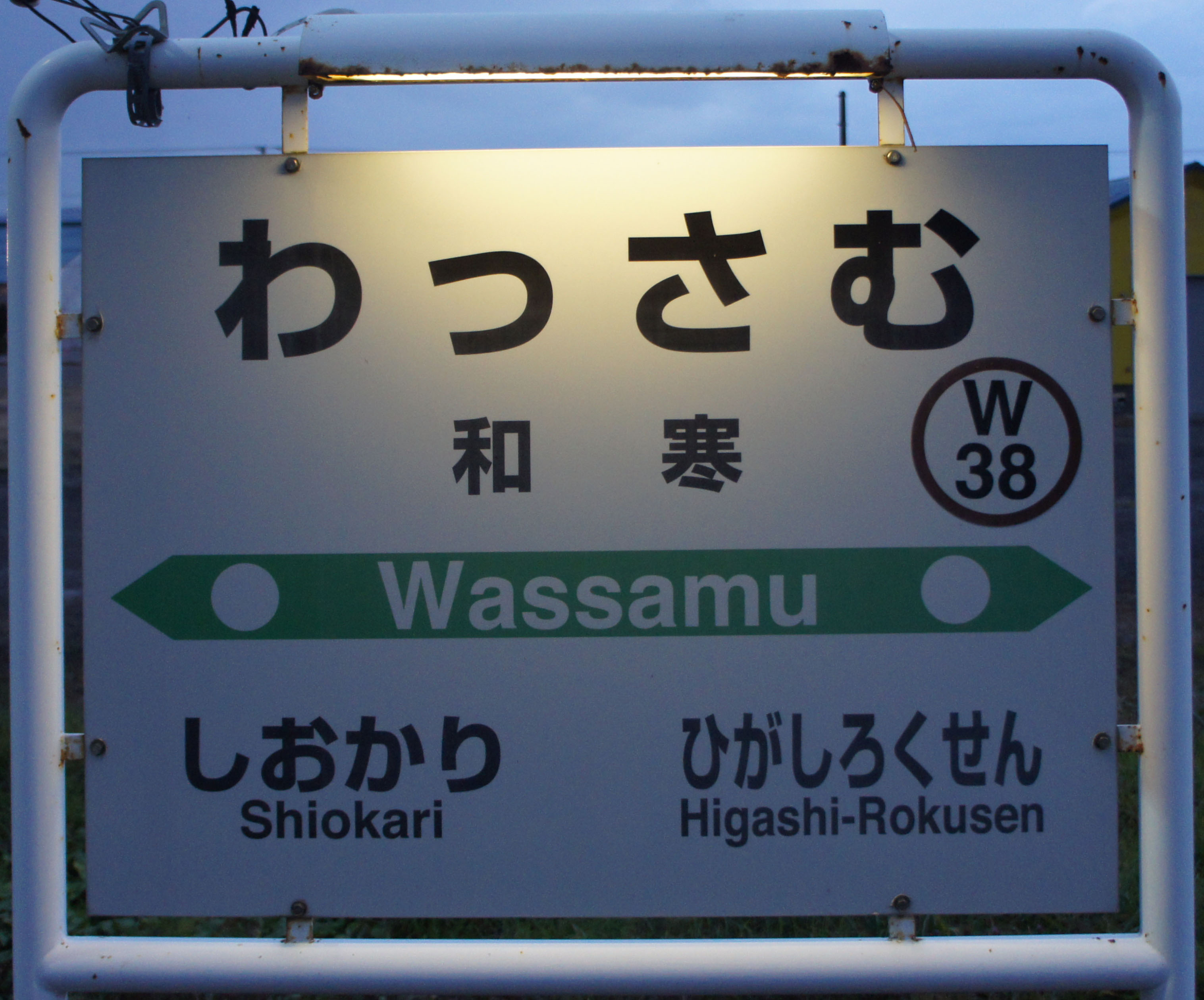
Signboard

== History ==
The station was opened as on 15 November 1899 with the extension of the Hokkaido Government Railway Teshio Line from Ranru Station. With the privatization of Japanese National Railways (JNR) on 1 April 1987, the station came under the control of JR Hokkaido. The station building was rebuilt in 1988.

== Passenger statistics ==
During fiscal 2019, the station was used on average by 88 passengers daily.

== Surrounding area ==
- Japan National Route 40
- Wassamu Town Office

== See also ==
- List of railway stations in Japan
