= Shibetsu Station =

Railway station in Shibetsu, Hokkaido, Japan

W42 Shibetsu Station 士別駅
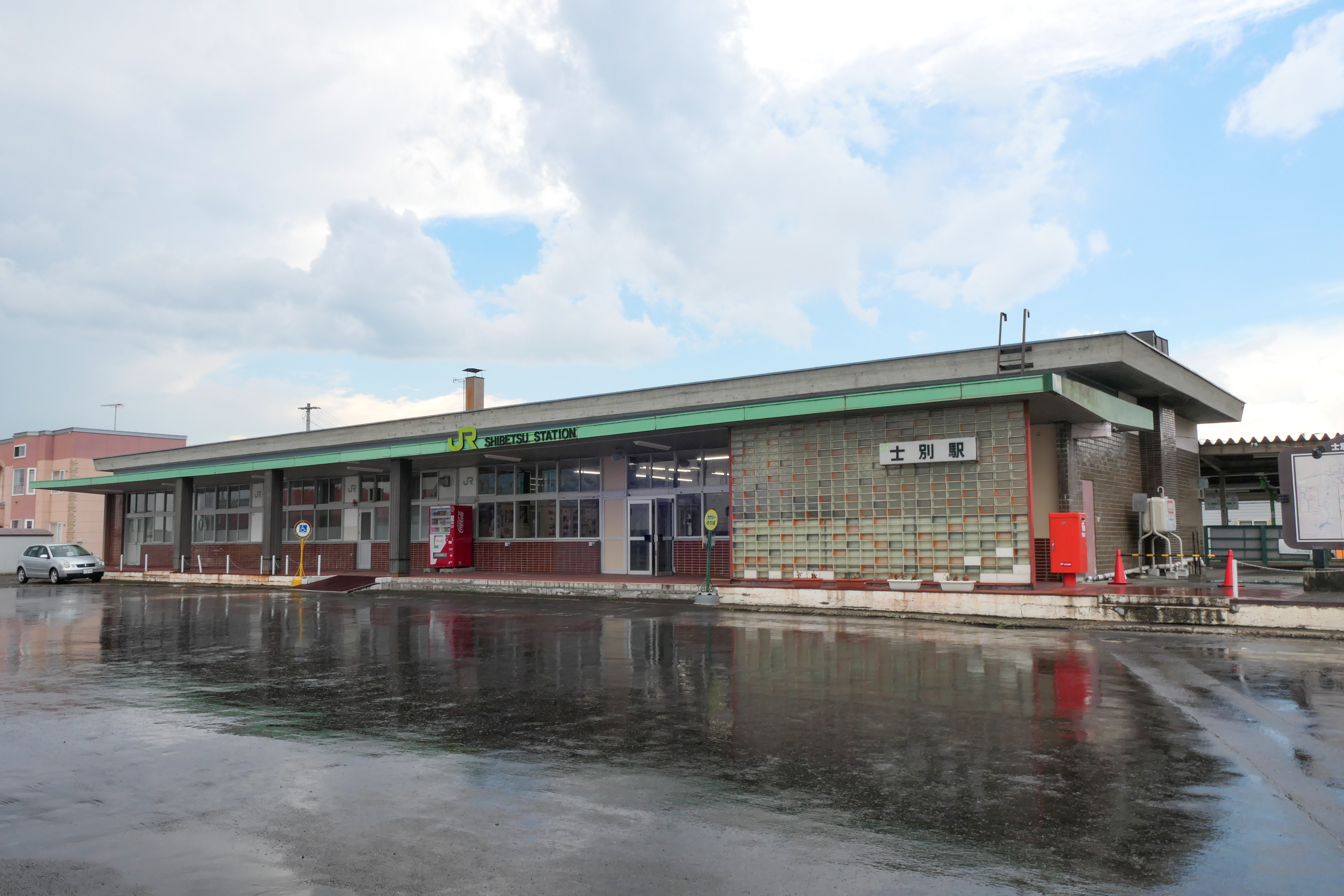
- Shibetsu Station in 2017

General information
- Location: 8 Chome Nishi 3 Jo, Shibetsu-si, Hokkaido 095-0023; Japan
- Coordinates: 44°10′21″N 142°23′17.8″E
- System: regional rail
- Operator: JR Hokkaido
- Line: Sōya Main Line
- Distance: 53.9 km (33.5 mi) from Asahikawa
- Platforms: 2 side platforms
- Train operators: JR Hokkaido

Construction
- Structure type: At grade

Other information
- Status: Syaffed (Midori no Madoguchi )
- Station code: W42
- Website: Official website

History
- Opened: 5 August 1900

Passengers
- FY2023: 720 (daily)

Services
Preceding station	JR Hokkaido	Following station
Nayoro towards Wakkanai	Sōya Main Line Local	Kembuchi towards Asahikawa
Fūren towards Wakkanai	Sōya Main Line Limited Express Nayoro	Kembuchi towards Asahikawa
Nayoro towards Wakkanai	Sōya Main Line Limited Express Sarobetsu	Wassamu towards Asahikawa
Nayoro towards Wakkanai	Sōya Main Line Limited Express Sōya	Wassamu towards Asahikawa
Location
- Location within Hokkaido Location within Japan

Shibetsu Station (士別駅, Shibetsu-eki)is a railway station located in the city of Shibetsu City, Kamikawa-shichō, Hokkaidō, Hokkaidō, Japan. It is operated by JR Hokkaido.

== Lines ==
The station is served by the 259.4 km (161.2 mi) Soya Main Line from Asahikawa to Wakkanai and is located 53.9 km from the starting point of the line at Asahikawa.

== Layout ==
The station is an above-ground station with two side platforms and two tracks. It used to have a side and an island platform, which was closed during the winter, but as of March 2023, it was closed all year round. The station building is located on the east side the platforms are connected by a footbridge. The station has a Midori no Madoguchi staffed ticket office.

=== Platforms ===
1	■ Sōya Main Line	for Asahikawa and Sapporo
2	■ Sōya Main Line	for Nayoro and Wakkanai

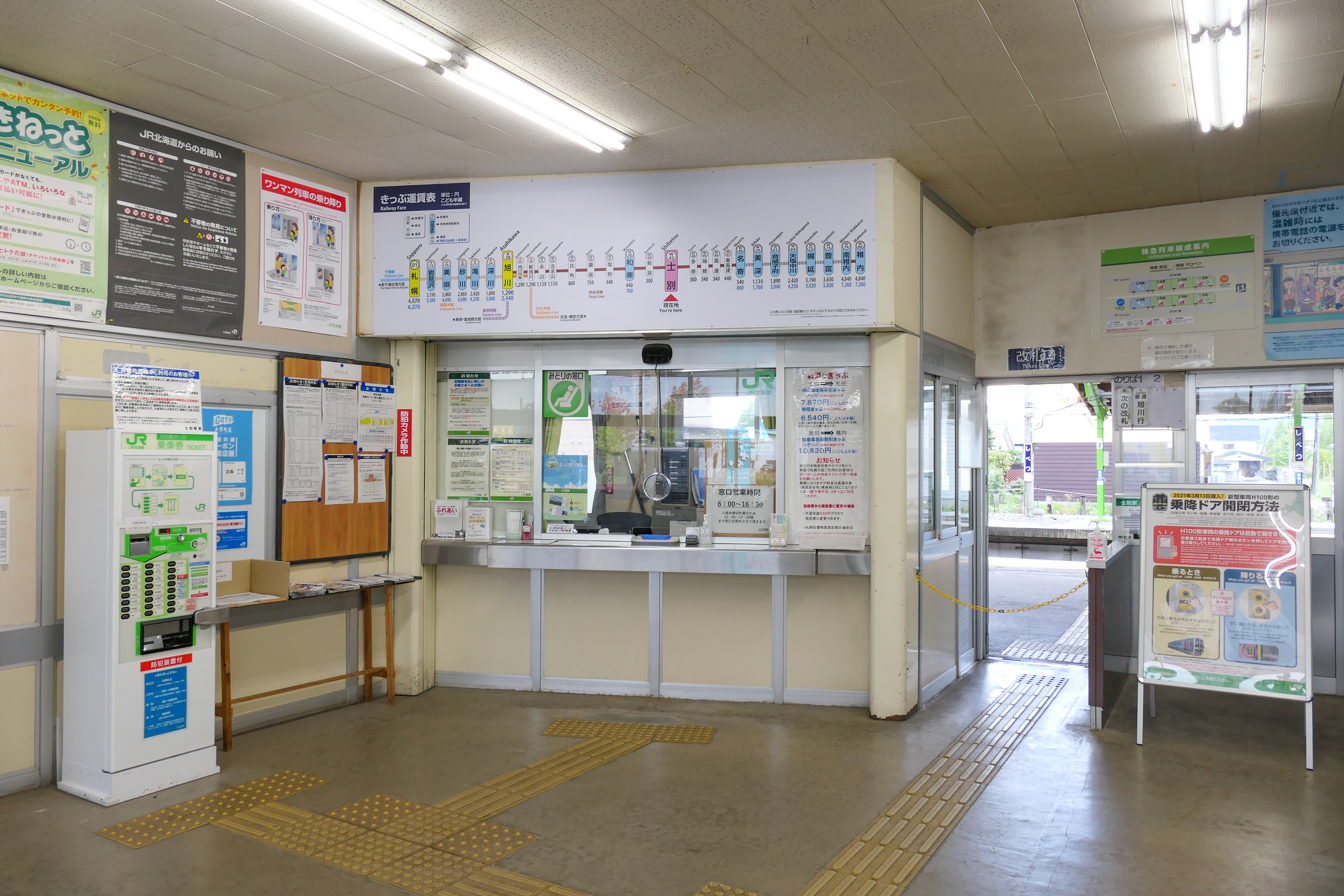
ticket gate

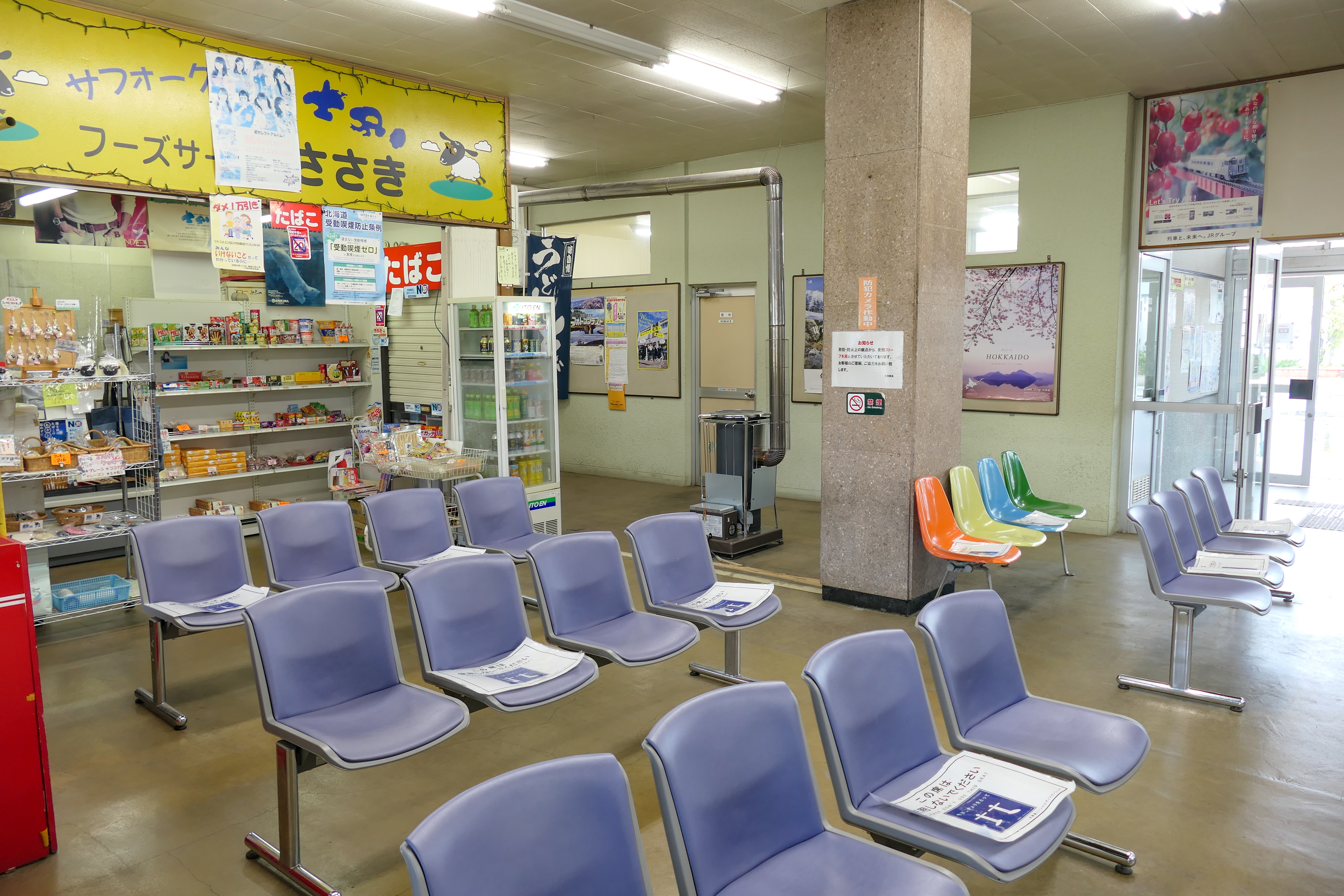
Waiting room

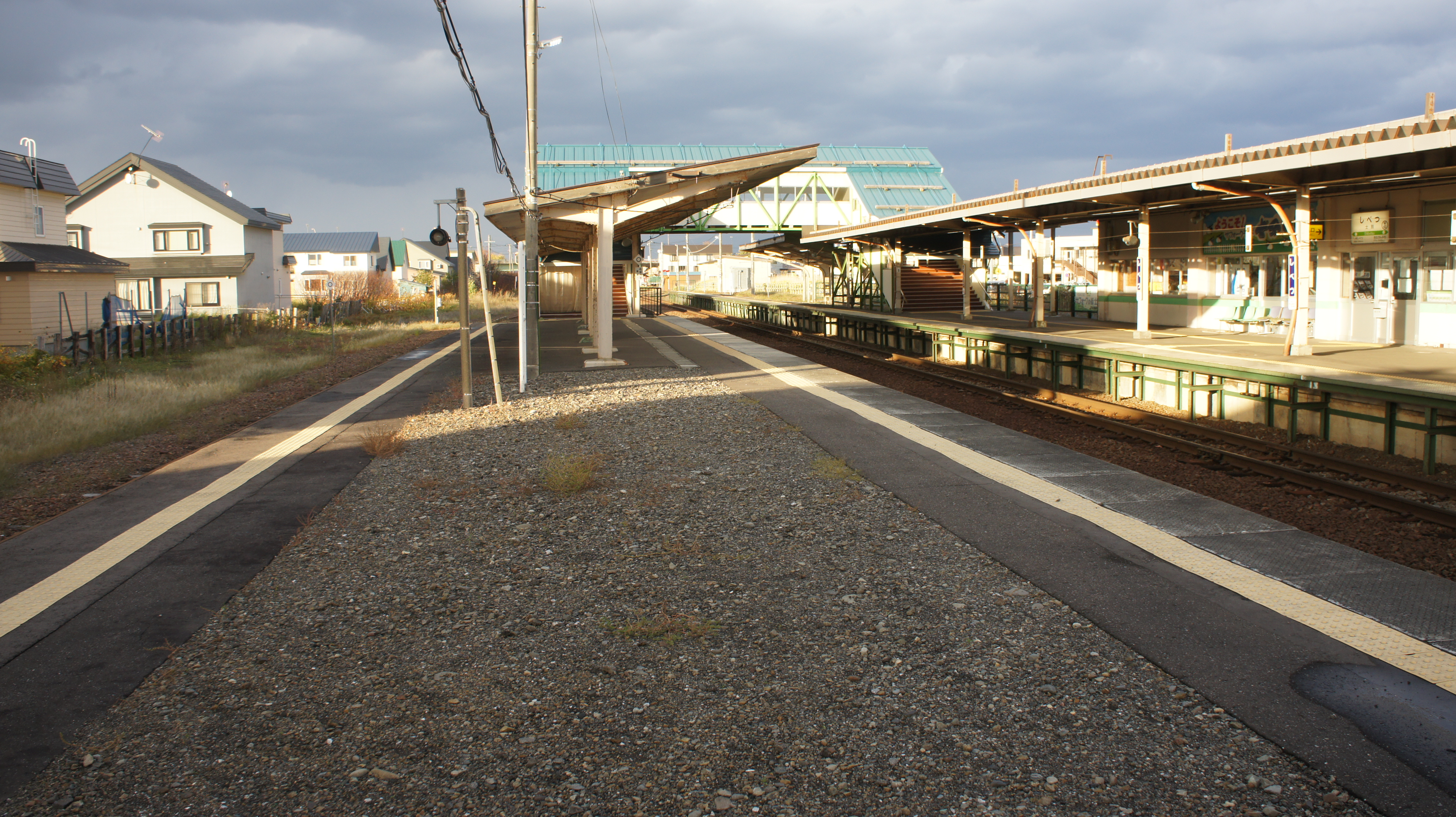
Platform

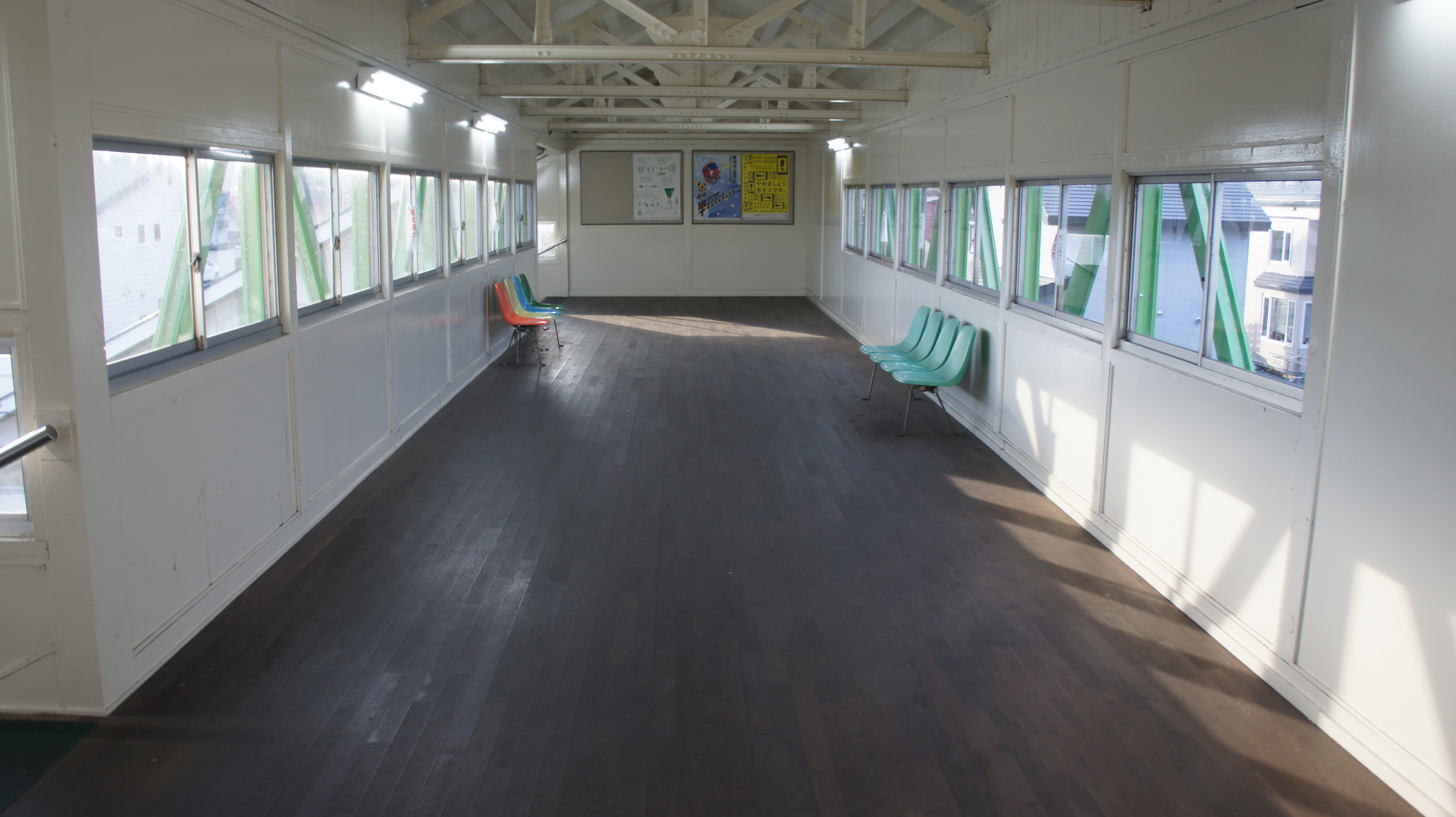
Footbridge

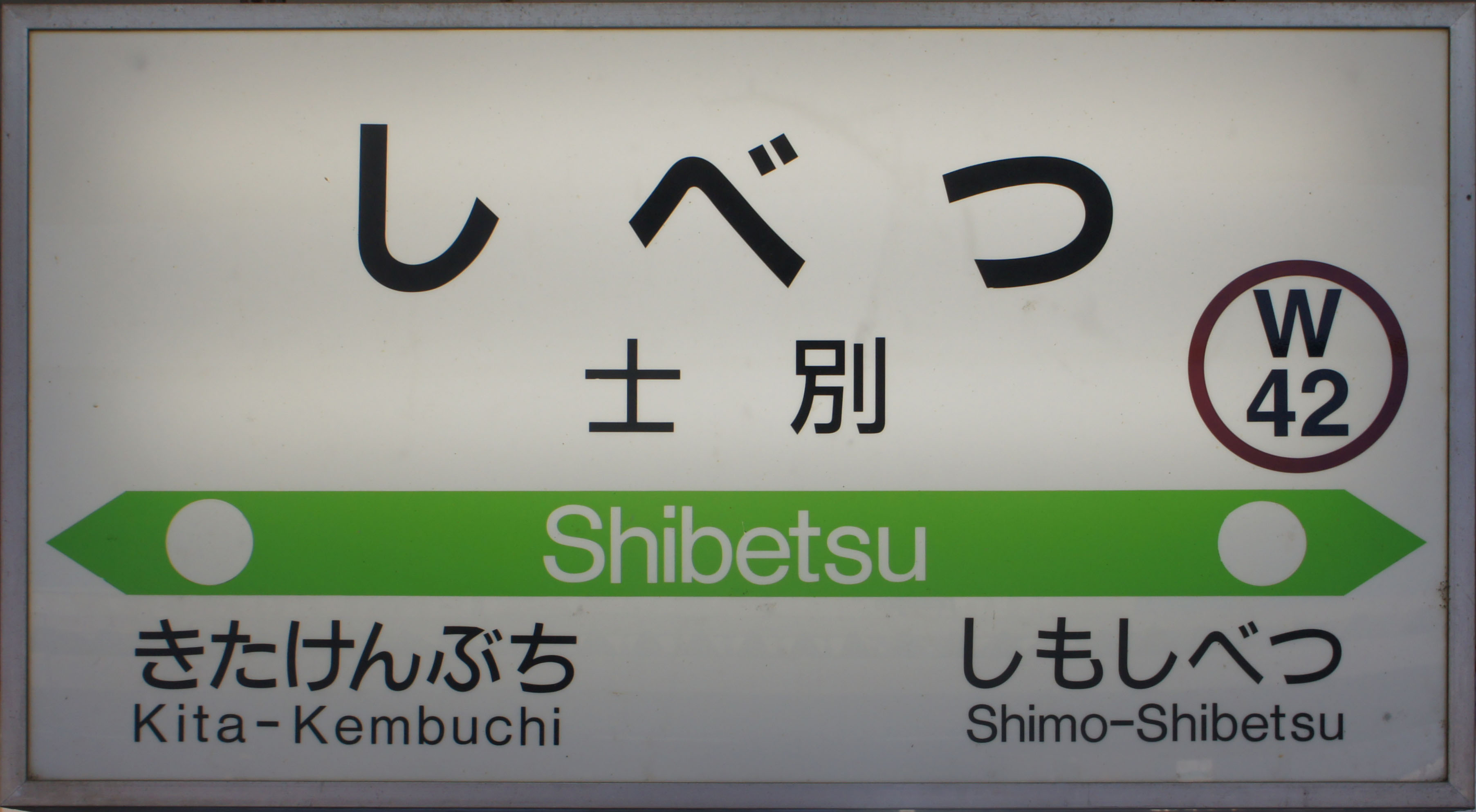
Signboard

== History ==
The station was opened on 5 August 1900 on the Hokkaido Government Railway Teshio Line. The current station buildinw as completed in 1966. With the privatization of Japanese National Railways (JNR) on 1 April 1987, it was raised to a full passenger train station, and came under the control of JR Hokkaido.

== Passenger statistics ==
During FY2023, the station was used on average by 720 passengers daily. (Note: Data published by the Ministry of Land, Infrastructure, Transport and Tourism state the number of passengers boarding and disembarking by station in a given year. FY2023 covers the period from 1 April 2023 to 31 March 2024. Data published by individual railways directly may state the number boarding only.)

== Surrounding area ==
- Japan National Route 40
- Shibetsu City Hall
- Shibetsu City Hospital
- Shibetsu City Museum

== See also ==
- List of railway stations in Japan
