= Pippu Station =

Railway station in Pippu, Hokkaido, Japan

W34 Pippu Station 比布駅
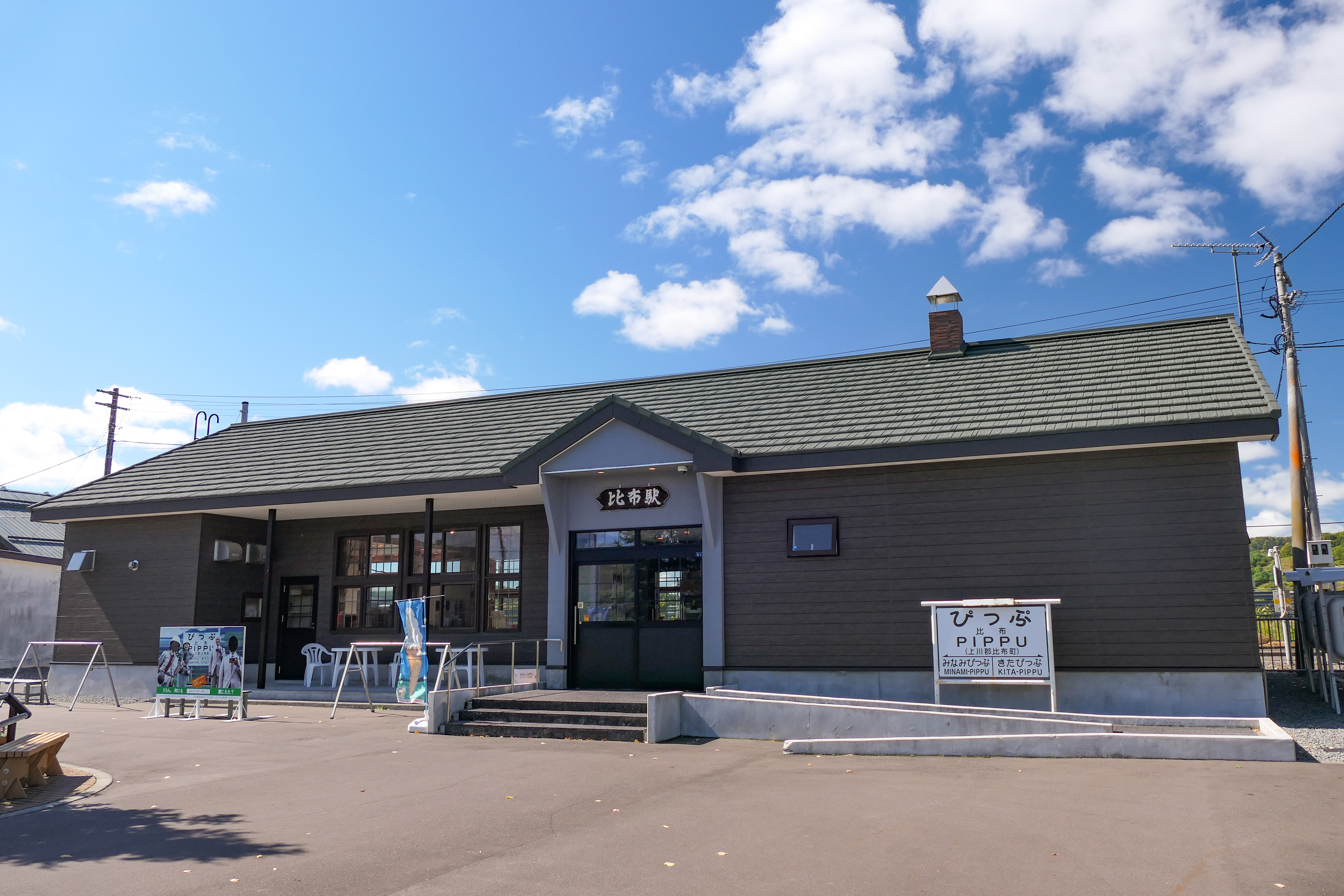
- Pippu Station

General information
- Location: 2-chōme-6 Nishimachi, Pippu, Kamikawa-gun, Hokkaido 078-0342; Japan
- Coordinates: 43.8749°N 142.4715°E
- System: regional rail
- Operator: JR Hokkaido
- Line: Sōya Main Line
- Distance: 17.1 km (10.6 mi) from Asahikawa
- Platforms: 2 side platforms
- Train operators: JR Hokkaido

Construction
- Structure type: At grade

Other information
- Status: Unattended
- Station code: W34
- Website: Official website

History
- Opened: 25 November 1898

Passengers
- FY2019: 101

Services
Preceding station	JR Hokkaido	Following station
Ranru towards Wakkanai	Sōya Main Line Local	Kita-Nagayama towards Asahikawa
Wassamu towards Wakkanai	Sōya Main Line Limited Express Nayoro 1, 3, 6, 7, 8	Nagayama towards Asahikawa
Ranru towards Wakkanai	Sōya Main Line Limited Express Nayoro 2, 5	Nagayama towards Asahikawa
Shiokari towards Wakkanai	Sōya Main Line Limited Express Nayoro 4	Nagayama towards Asahikawa
Location
- Location within Hokkaido Location within Japan

Pippu Station (比布駅, Pippu-eki) is a railway station located in the town of Pippu, Hokkaidō, Japan. It is operated by JR Hokkaido.

== Lines ==
The station is served by the 259.4 km (161.2 mi) Soya Main Line from Asahikawa to Wakkanai and is located 17.1 km from the starting point of the line at Asahikawa.

== Layout ==
The station above-ground station with two opposing side platform connected by a footbridge. The current station building was rebuilt by Pippu Town in 2016 and is a single-story wooden structure. Inside the station building, in addition to a waiting room, there is a coffee shop and a souvenir shop. The signboard in front of the station building and the signboard on the platform side are the same as those that were displayed in the old station building. The station is unattended.

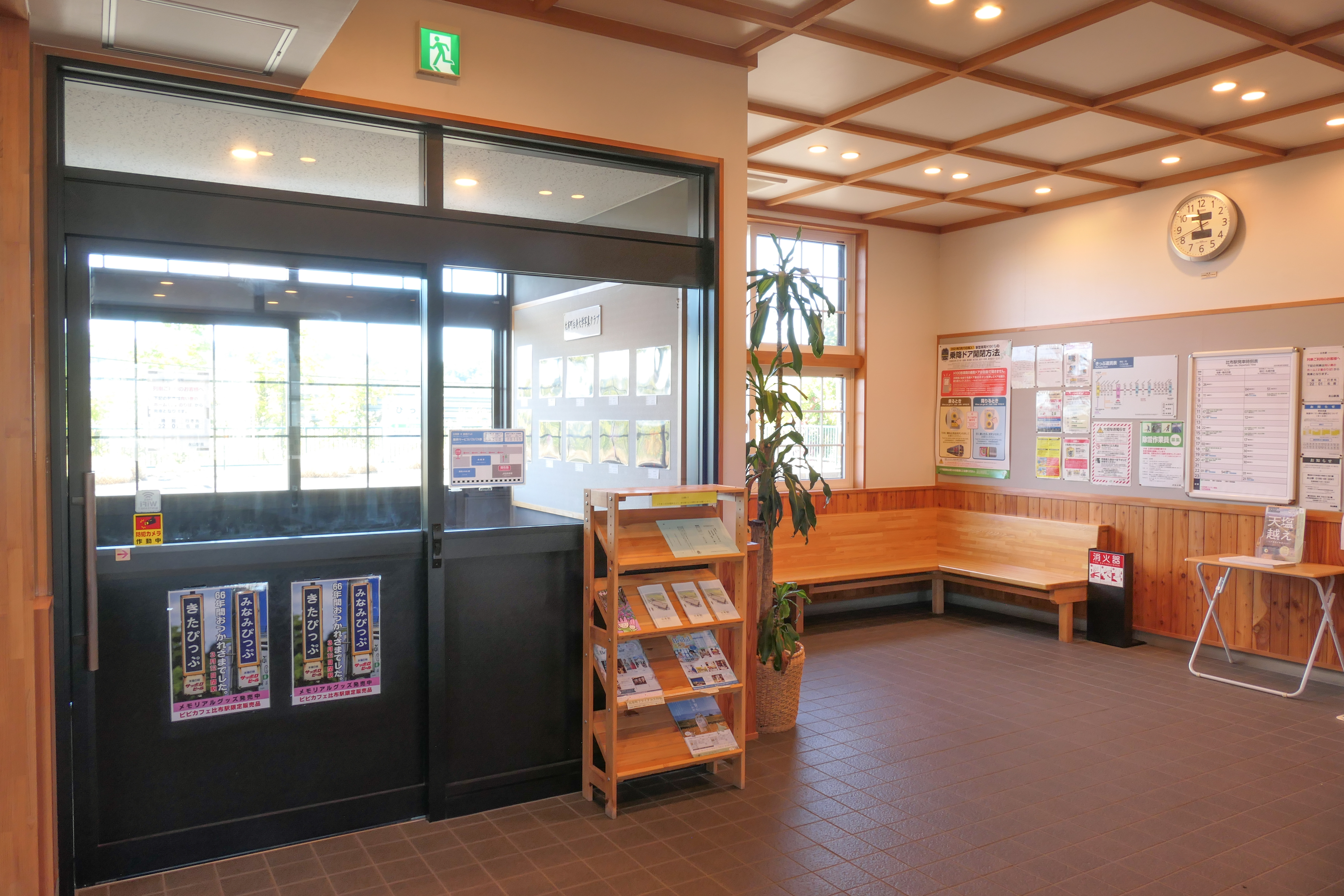
Waiting room

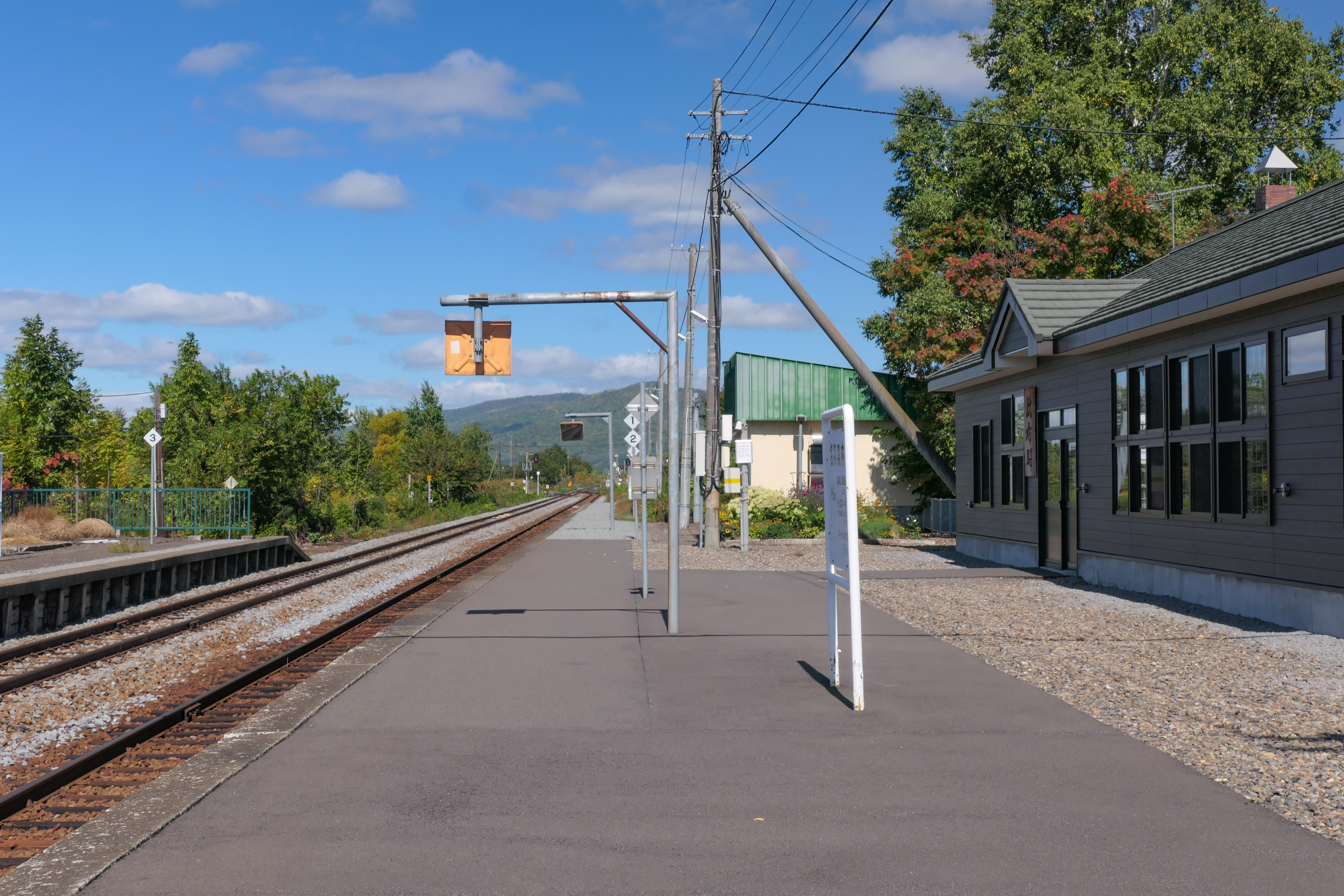
No.1 Platform

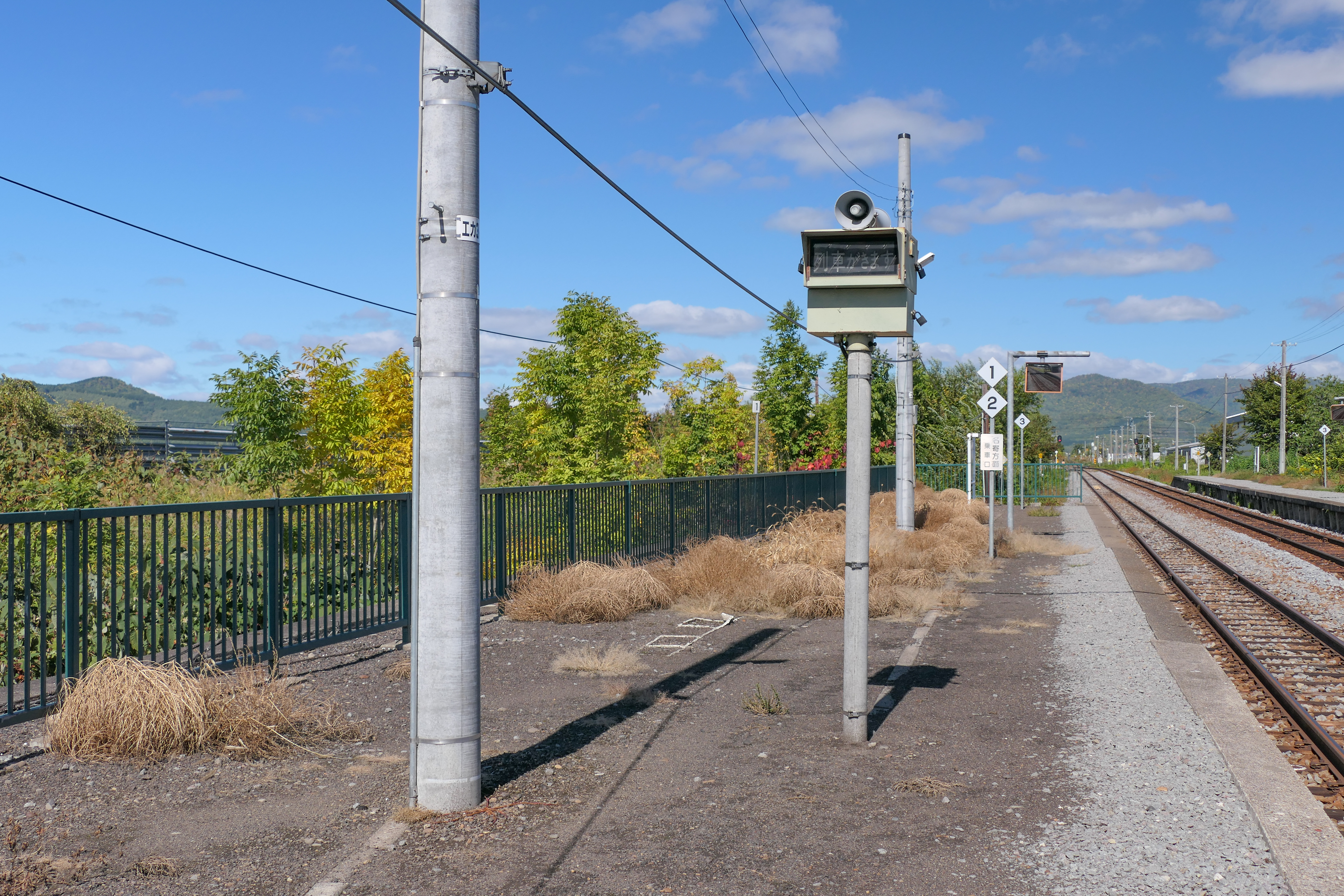
No.2 Platform

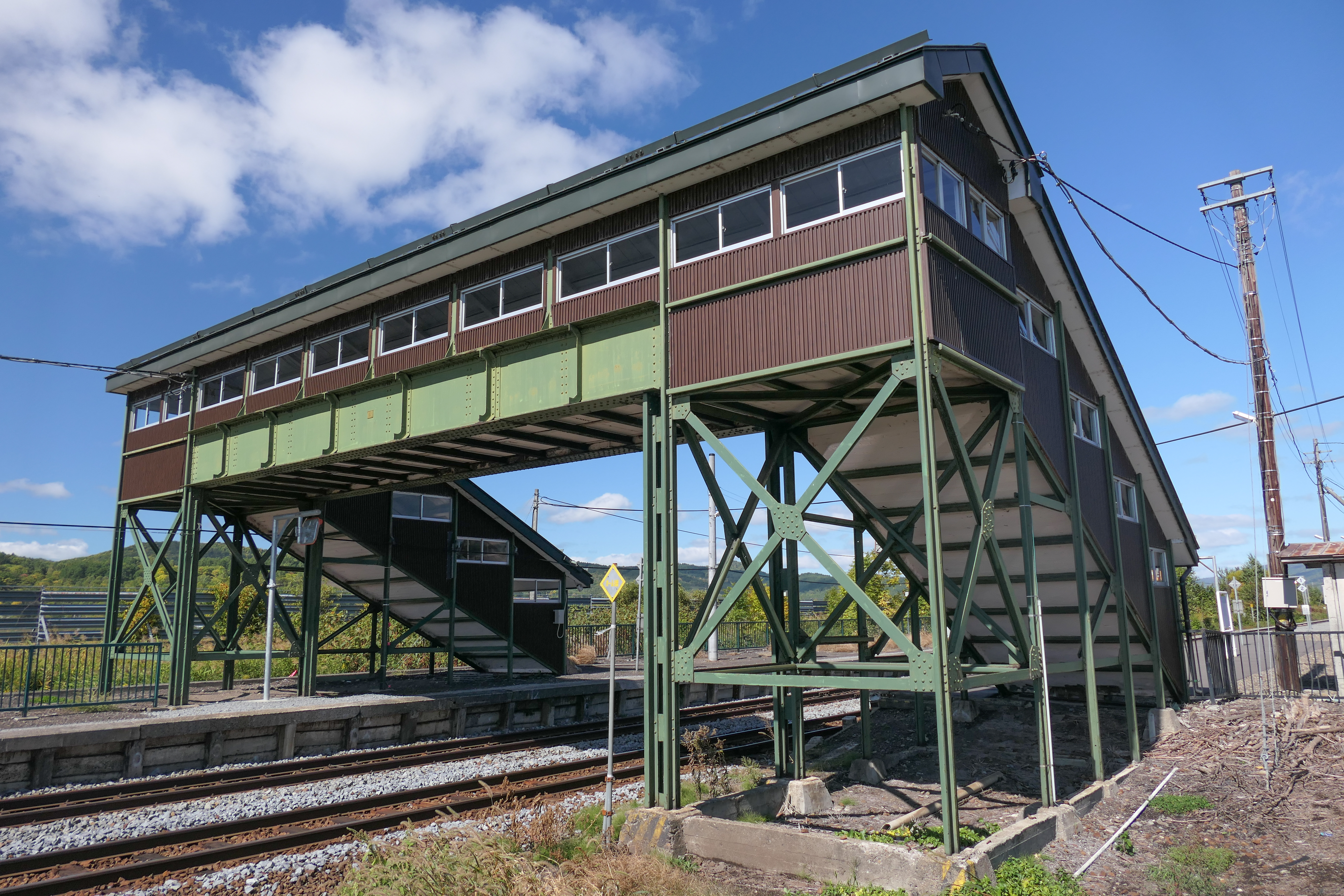
Footbridge

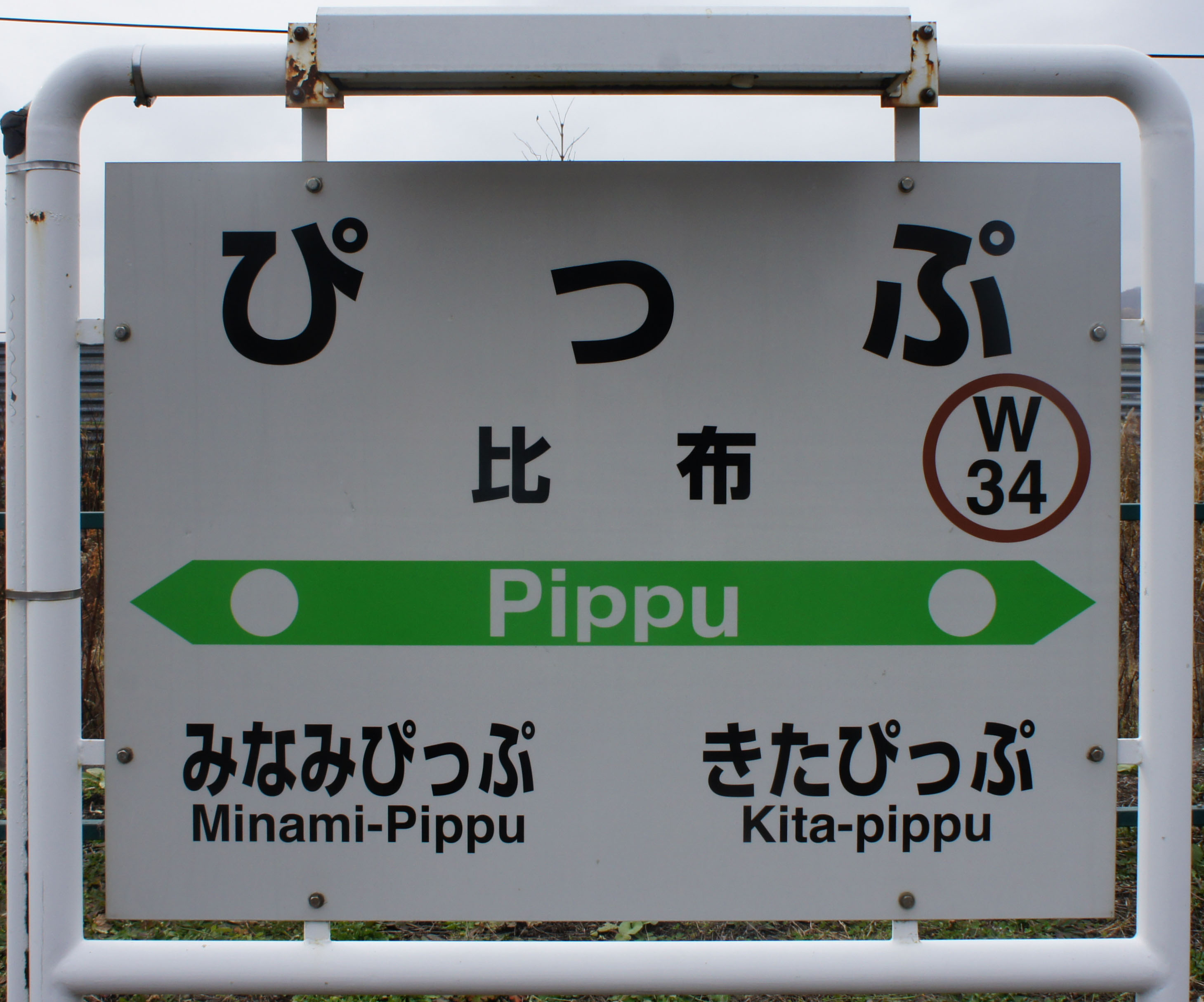
Signboard in 2017

== History ==
The station was opened on 25 November 1898 with the extension of the Hokkaido Government Railway Teshio Line. With the privatization of Japanese National Railways (JNR) on 1 April 1987, the station came under the control of JR Hokkaido.

== Passenger statistics ==
During fiscal 2019, the station was used on average by 101 passengers daily.

== Surrounding area ==
- Japan National Route 40
- Pippu Town Hall

== See also ==
- List of railway stations in Japan
