= Asahikawa University Junior College =

Private junior college in Asahikawa, Hokkaidō, Japan

Coordinates: 43°49′0.8″N 142°26′45.28″E

- 旭川大学短期大学部
- Type: Private
- Established: 1964
- Location: Asahikawa, Hokkaidō, Japan
- Website: www.asahikawa-u.ac.jp

Asahikawa University Junior College (旭川大学短期大学部, Asahikawa Daigaku Tanki Daigakubu) is a private junior college attached to Asahikawa University in Asahikawa, Hokkaidō, Japan. It was established in 1964 as a women's college, and became coeducational in 2011.

== Departments ==
- Department of Home Economics
- Department of Childcare

== See also ==
- List of junior colleges in Japan
