= Ranru Station =

Railway station in Pippu, Hokkaido, Japan

W36 Ranru Station 蘭留駅
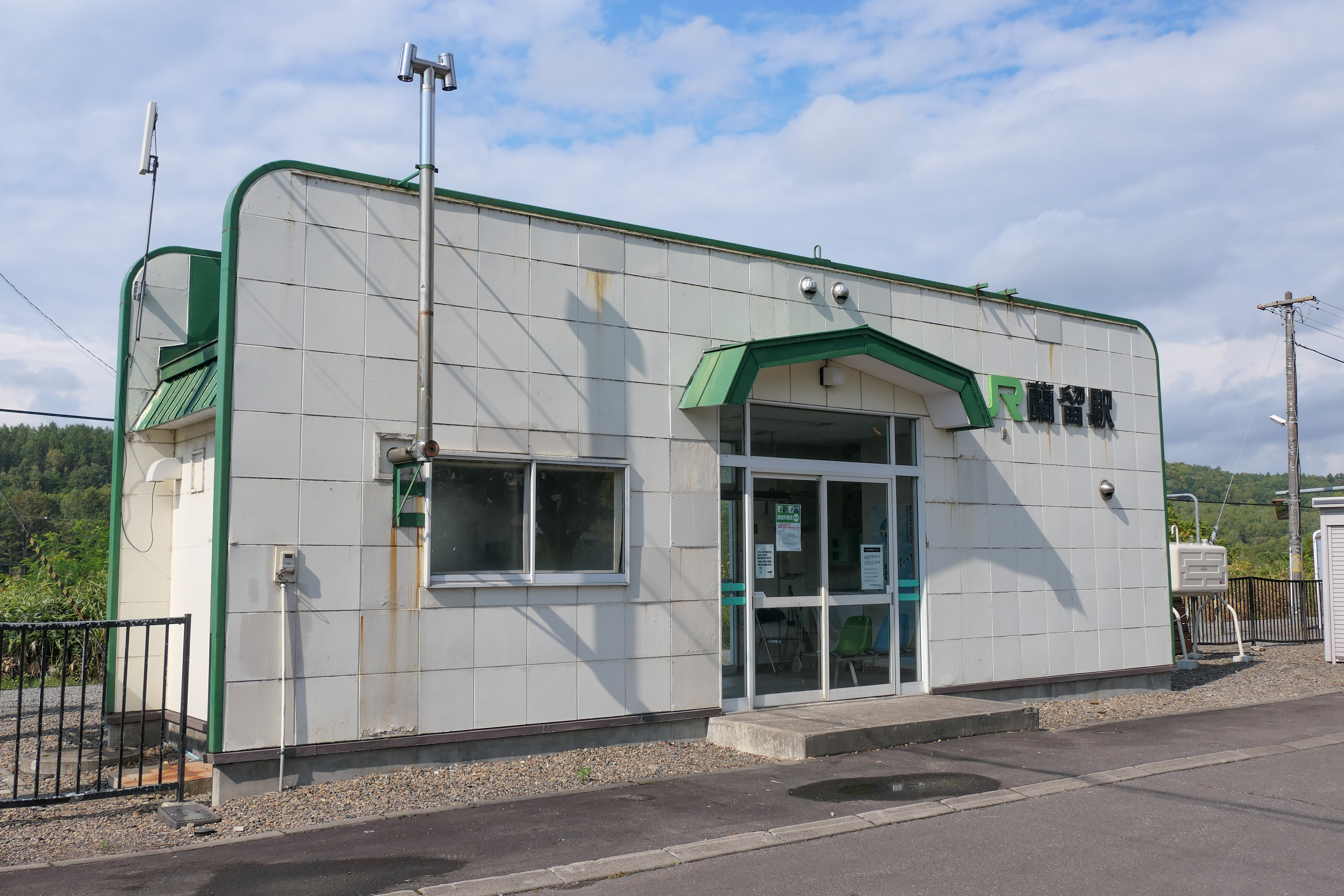
- Ranru Station

General information
- Location: Kita-9-sen 14-gō, Pippu, Kamikawa-gun, Hokkaido 078-0329; Japan
- Coordinates: 43.9251°N 142.4735°E
- System: regional rail
- Operator: JR Hokkaido
- Line: Sōya Main Line
- Distance: 22.8 km (14.2 mi) from Asahikawa
- Platforms: 2 side platforms
- Train operators: JR Hokkaido

Construction
- Structure type: At grade

Other information
- Status: Unattended
- Station code: W36
- Website: Official website

History
- Opened: 25 November 1898

Passengers
- FY2019: 2

Services
Preceding station	JR Hokkaido	Following station
Shiokari towards Wakkanai	Sōya Main Line Local	Pippu towards Asahikawa
Location
- Location within Hokkaido Location within Japan

Ranru Station (蘭留駅, Ranru-eki) is a railway station located in the town of Pippu, Kamikawa-gun, Hokkaidō, Japan. It is operated by JR Hokkaido.

== Lines ==
The station is served by the 259.4 km (161.2 mi) Soya Main Line from Asahikawa to Wakkanai and is located 22.8 km from the starting point of the line at Asahikawa.

== Layout ==
The station is an above-ground station with two opposed side platforms connected by a level crossing. The station is unattended.

=== Platforms ===
1, 2	■ Sōya Main Line	for Asahikawa for Nayoro

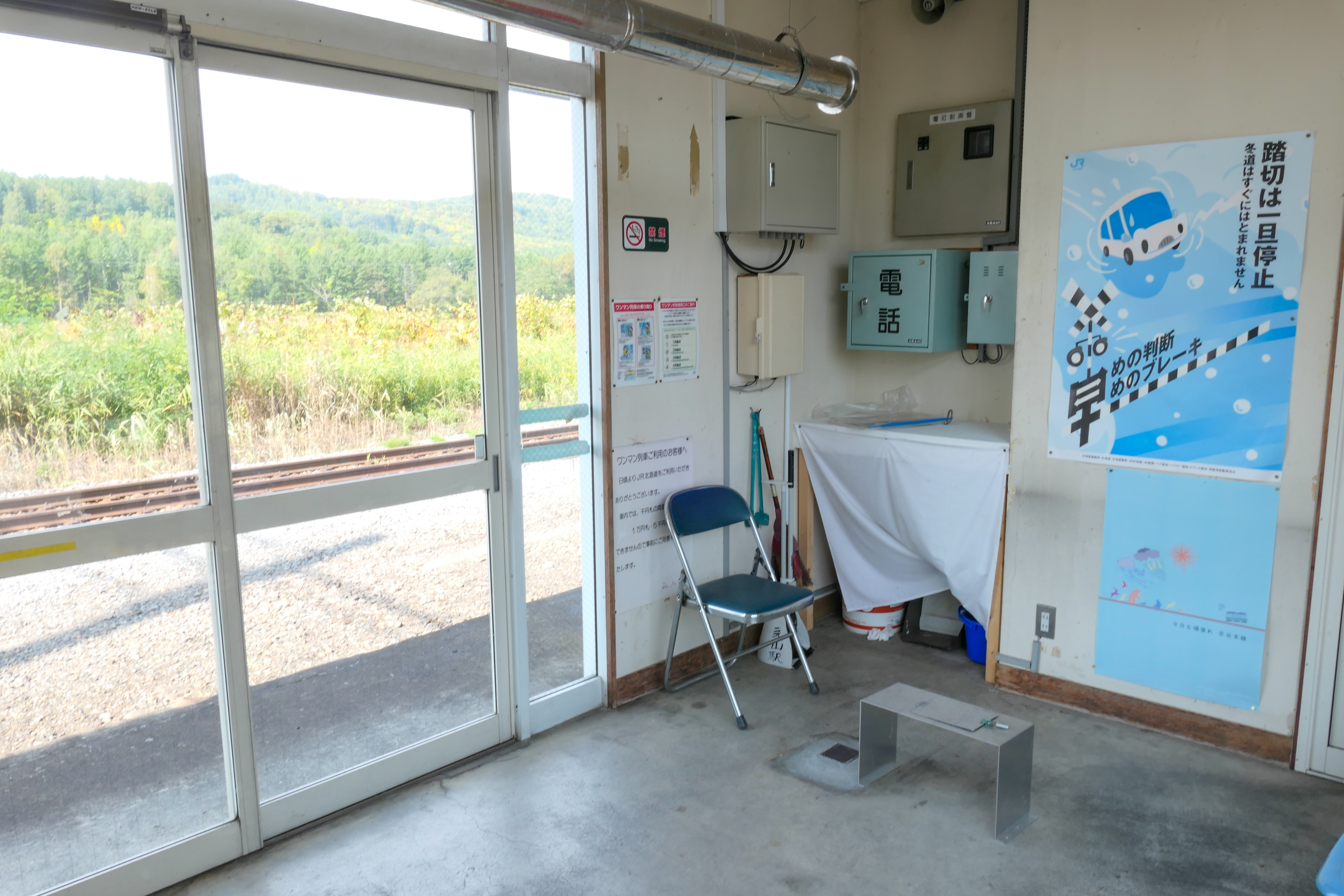
Station interior

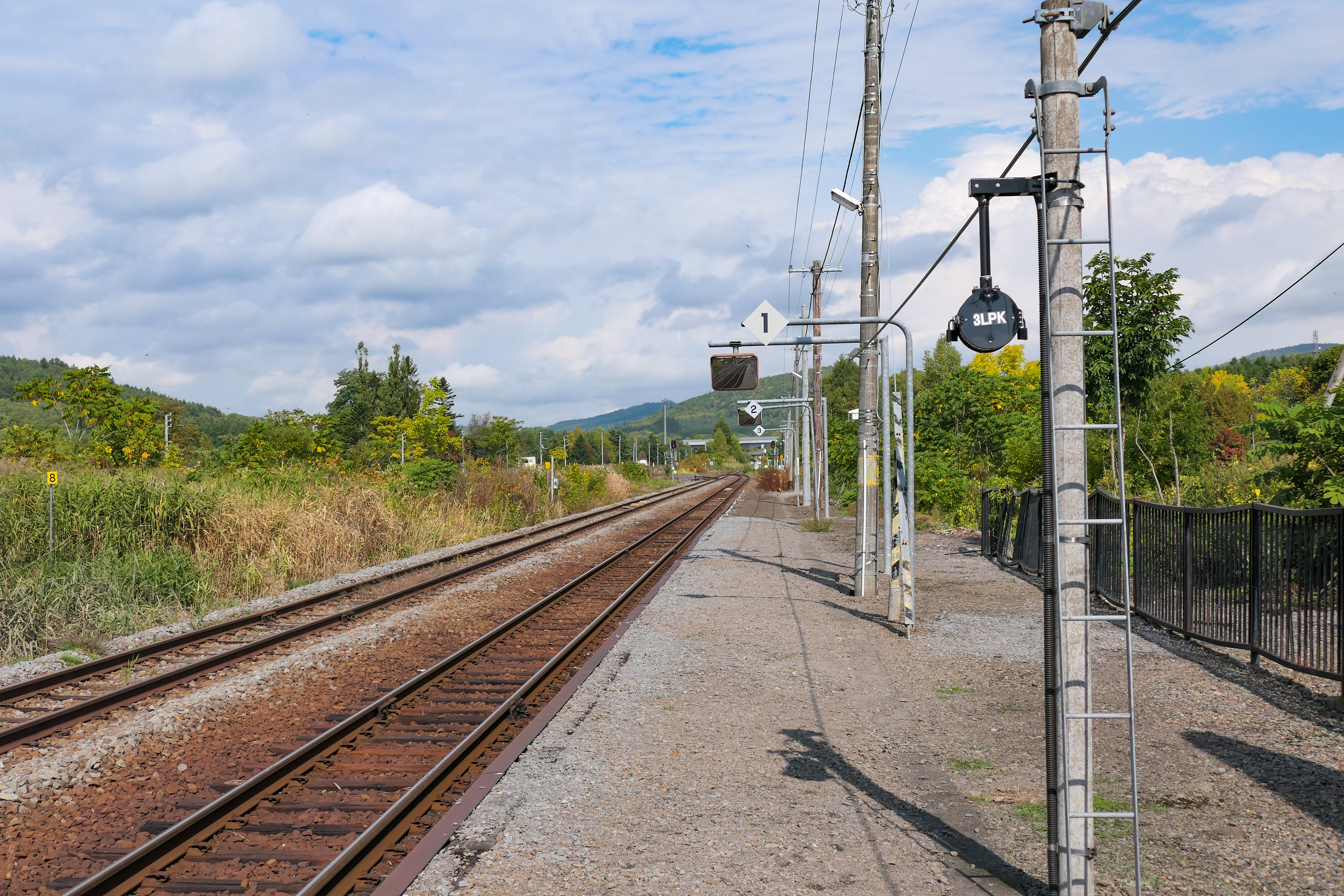
No.1 Platform

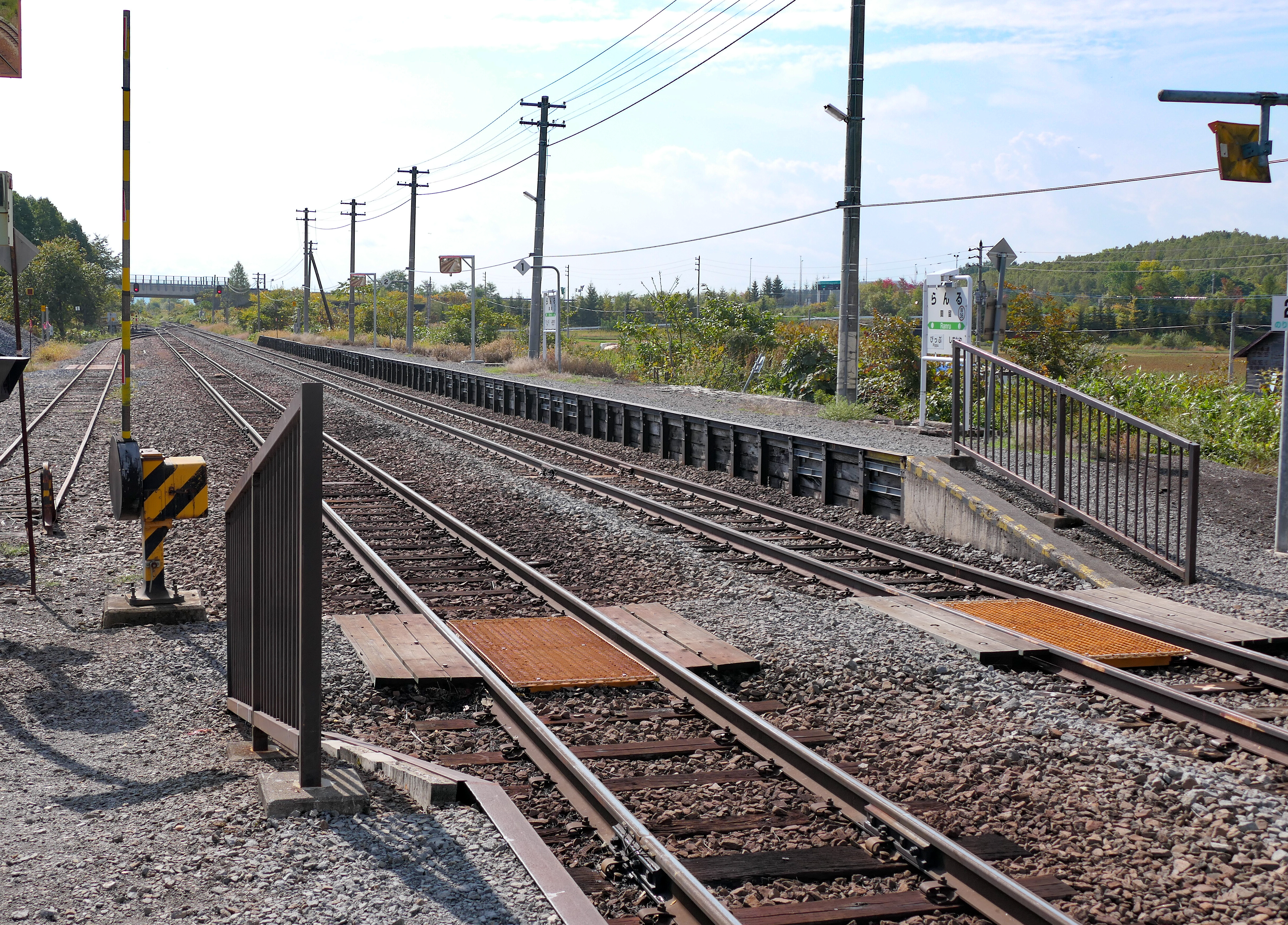
Level crossing and No.2 Platform

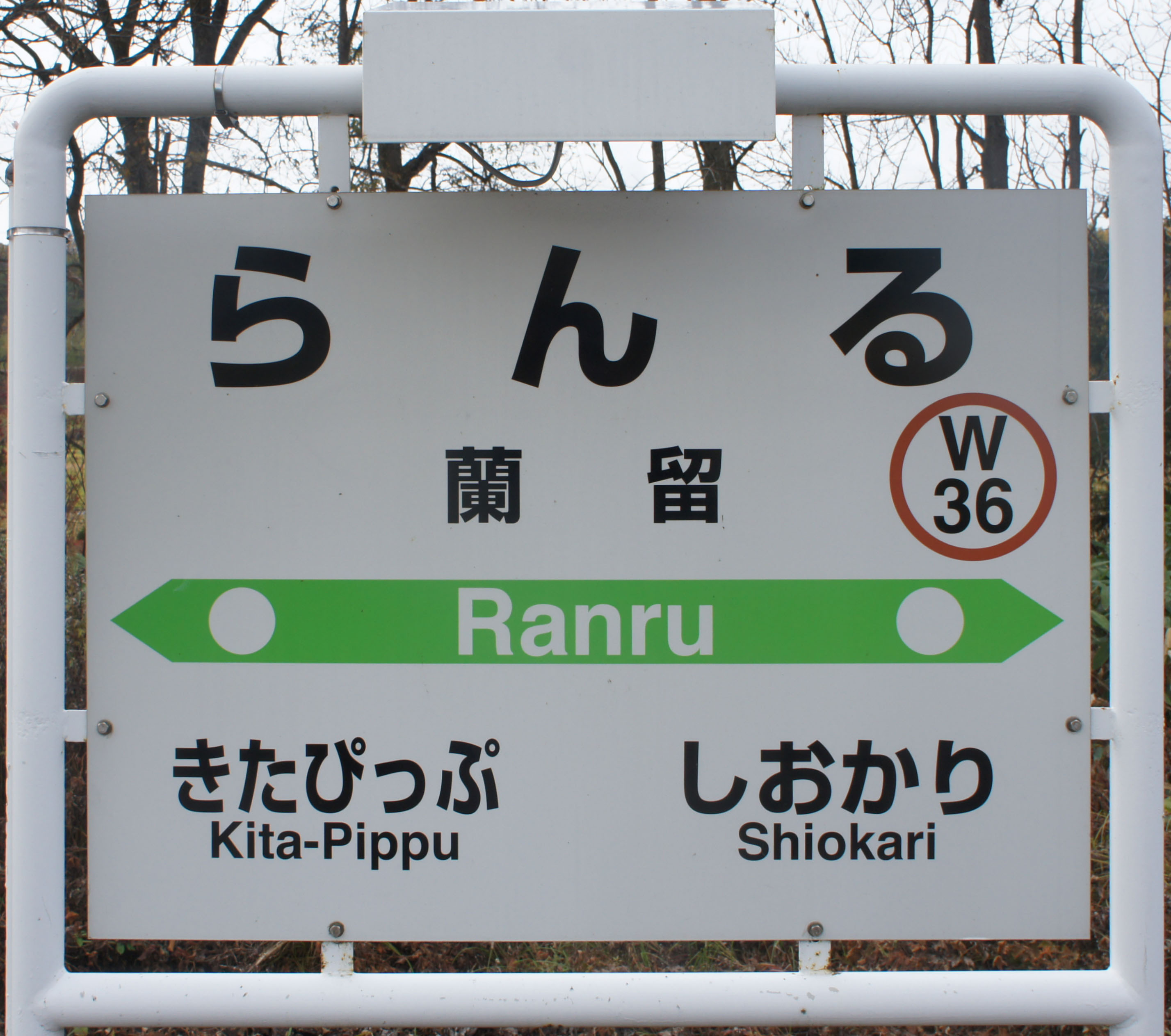
Signboard

== History ==
The station was opened as on 25 November 1898 with the extension of the Hokkaido Government Railway Teshio Line. With the privatization of Japanese National Railways (JNR) on 1 April 1987, the station came under the control of JR Hokkaido. The station building was rebuilt in 1988.

== Passenger statistics ==
During fiscal 2019, the station was used on average by 2 passengers daily.

== Surrounding area ==
- Japan National Route 40

== See also ==
- List of railway stations in Japan
