= Asahikawa City University =

Coordinates: 43°49′0.9″N 142°26′44.4″E

- 旭川市立大学
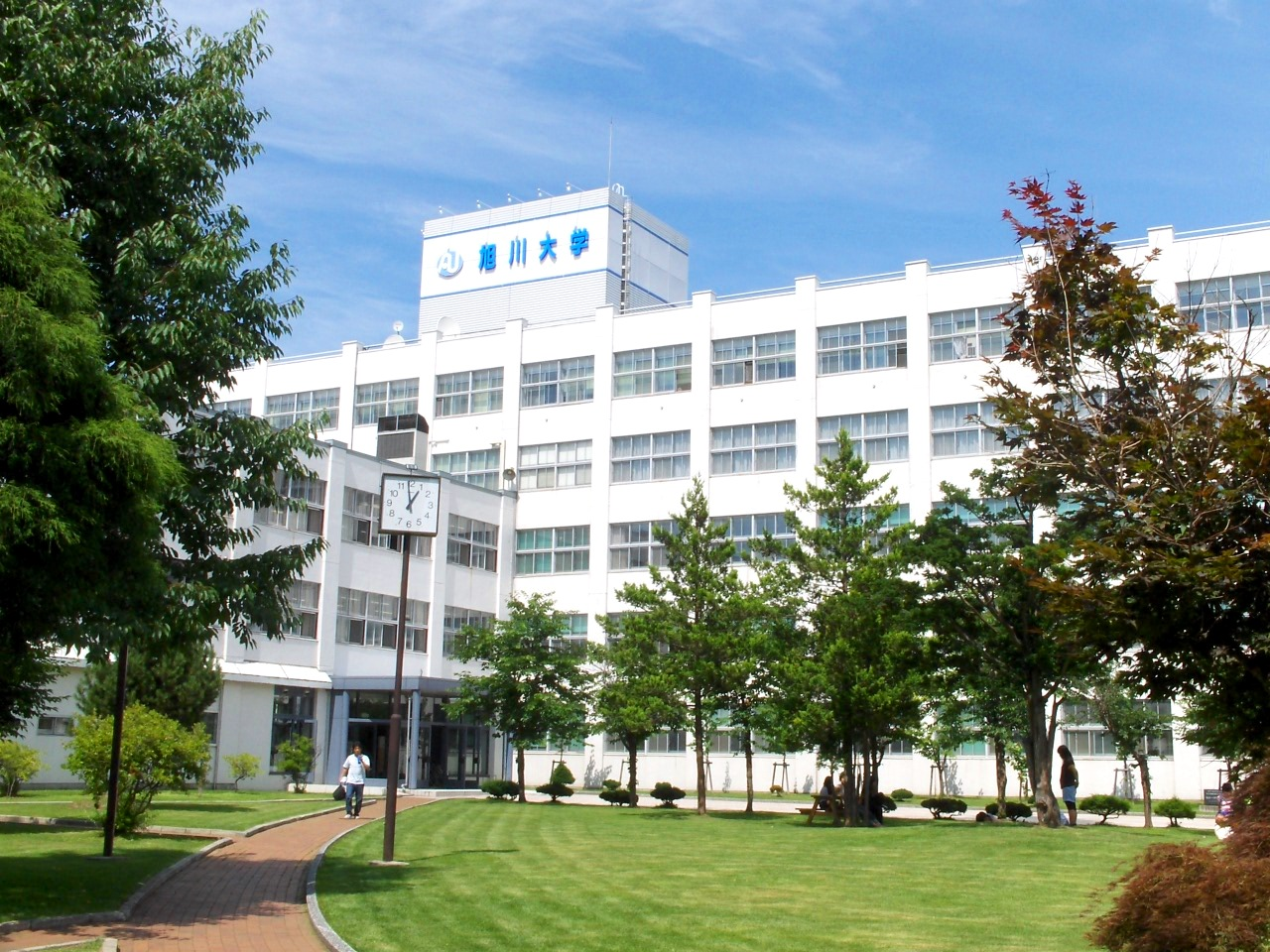
- City University
- Former names: Asahikawa University
- Type: public
- Established: 1898 (founded); 1968 (chartered)
- Founders: Sawai Hyōjirō
- Location: 3-23-chome, Nagayama, Asahikawa, Hokkaido, Japan
- Website: www.asahikawa-u.ac.jp

Asahikawa City University (旭川市立大学, Asahikawa Shiritsu daigaku) is a public university in Asahikawa, Hokkaido, Japan. Established in 1898, it was chartered as a university in 1968. It is officially accredited/recognized by the Ministry of Education, Culture, Sports, Science and Technology. The university offers courses and programs leading to bachelor's and master's degrees in several areas of study.

Asahikawa City University provides academic and non-academic facilities and services to students including a library, sport facilities and/or activities, as well as administrative services.

== History ==
The university's predecessor was founded as Asahikawa Sewing Vocational School in 1898 by Sawai Hyōjirō. In 1904, it was renamed Asahikawa Girls' Sewing School.

In 1968, it was chartered as a university as Kitanihon Gakuin University and renamed Asahikawa University in 1970.

The university's graduate school was established in 1999, with the establishment of the Graduate School of Economics.

In 2023, transformed from a private university to a public university, it was renamed Asahikawa City University.

== Lawsuit ==
The university became known for being party to a legal action involving the dismissal of a non-Japanese "English as a Foreign Language" teacher. The teacher was dismissed because it was believed she had lost her "freshness" and was unable to teach foreign culture, as she had been employed by the university for an extended period and was married to a Japanese national. The case was subject to appeals by both sides and was finally found in favor of the university as the Supreme Court declined to hear the employee's final appeal.
