= Asahikawa Station =

Railway station in Asahikawa, Hokkaido, Japan

Coordinates: 43.763005°N 142.358995°E

A28 Asahikawa Station 旭川駅
- Asahikawa Station building

General information
- Location: 8-3-1 Miyashitadōri, Asahikawa-shi, Hokkaido; Japan
- Operator: JR Hokkaido
- Lines: Hakodate Main Line; Sōya Main Line; Sekihoku Main Line; Furano Line
- Distance: 423.1 km (262.9 mi) from Hakodate
- Platforms: 3 island platforms and 1 side platform
- Tracks: 7

Construction
- Structure type: Elevated
- Architect: Hiroshi Naito

Other information
- Status: Staffed
- Station code: A28
- Website: www.jrasahi.co.jp/contents/facilities/station/a28_asahikawa.html

History
- Opened: 16 July 1898; 128 years ago
- Rebuilt: 2010-2011

Passengers
- FY2023: 7,044 (daily)
Location
- Location within Hokkaido Location within Japan

Asahikawa Station (旭川駅, Asahikawa-eki) is a railway station in Asahikawa, Hokkaido, Japan, operated by the Hokkaido Railway Company (JR Hokkaido).

Asahikawa Station is the central train station for the city of Asahikawa, which is the second largest city in Hokkaido by population after Sapporo.

== Lines ==
The station is the terminus for the following JR Hokkaido lines.

- Hakodate Main Line
- Sōya Main Line
- Sekihoku Main Line (shin Asahikawa: terminus)
- Furano Line

The station is numbered "A28".

== Station layout ==
Asahikawa Station has 4 platforms serving 7 tracks. All platforms are located on the upper level above the concourse.

Platform No	Line Name	Direction
1	■ Furano Line	for Biei・Furano
2	■ Sekihoku Main Line	for Kamikawa・Engaru・Kitami
3	■ Hakodate Main Line	for Fukagawa・Takikawa・Iwamizawa・Sapporo
3	■ Sekihoku Main Line	for Kamikawa
3	■ Sōya Main Line	for Nayoro・Otoineppu
4	■ Hakodate Main Line	for Fukagawa・Takikawa・Iwamizawa・Sapporo
4	■ Sekihoku Main Line	for Engaru・Kitami・Abashiri
5	■ Sekihoku Main Line	for Engaru・Kitami・Abashiri
5	■ Soya Main Line	for Nayoro・Wakkanai
6	■ Hakodate Main Line	for Fukagawa・Takikawa・Iwamizawa・Sapporo
6	■ Soya Main Line	for Nayoro・Wakkanai
7	■ Hakodate Main Line	for Fukagawa・Takikawa・Iwamizawa・Sapporo
7	■ Sekihoku Main Line	for Kamikawa
7	■ Soya Main Line	for Nayoro

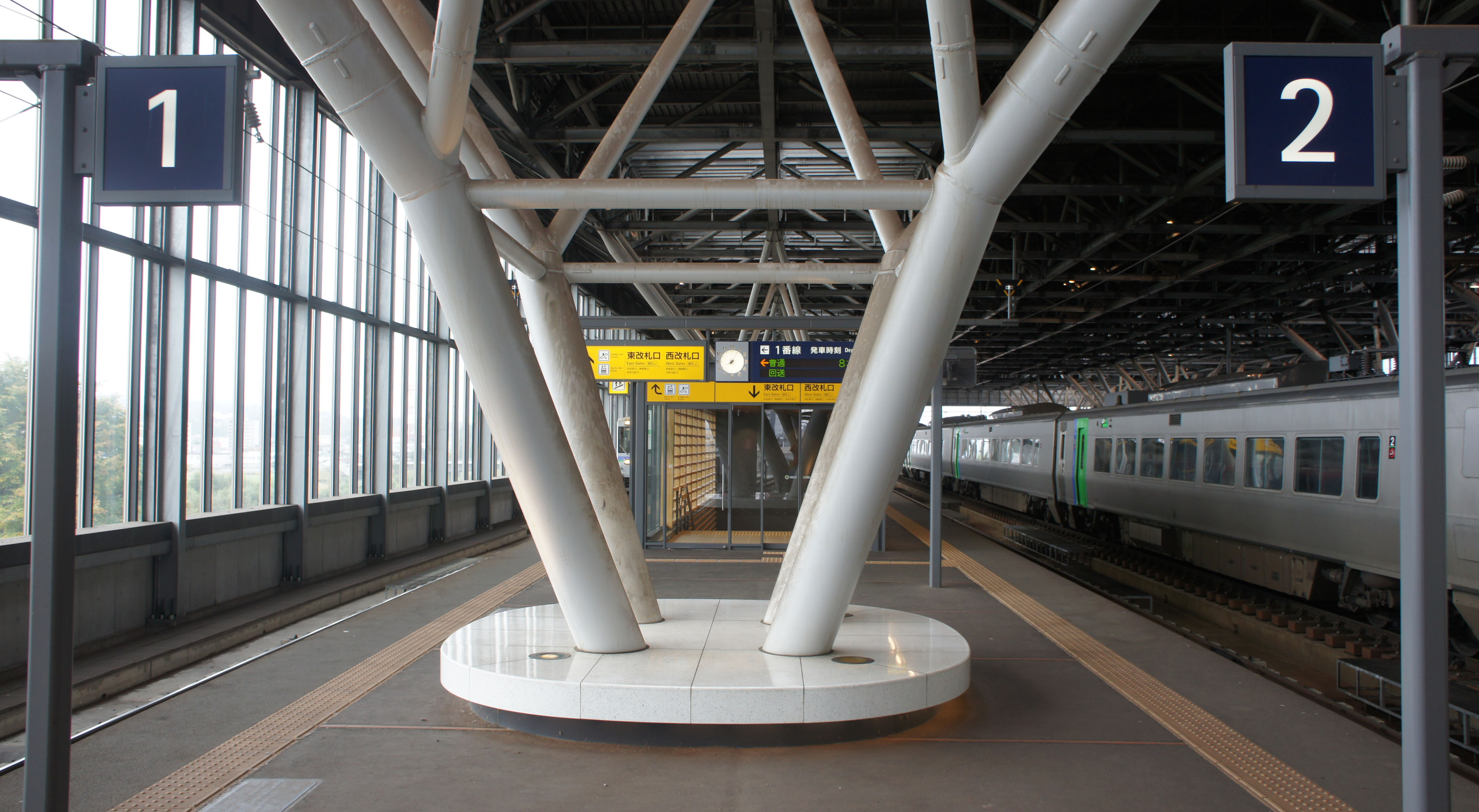
Platforms 1 and 2 (2018)

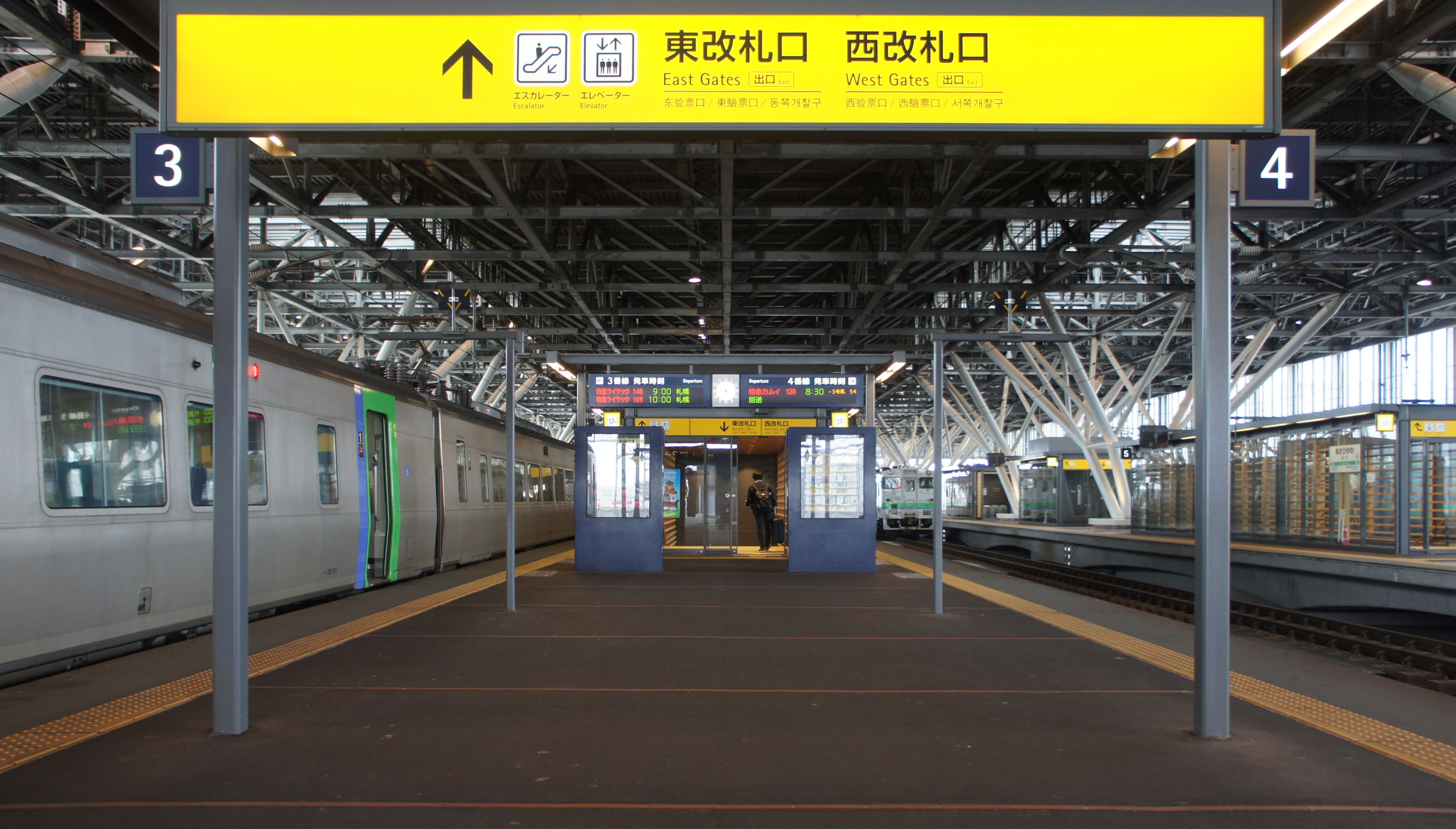
Platforms 3 and 4 (2018)

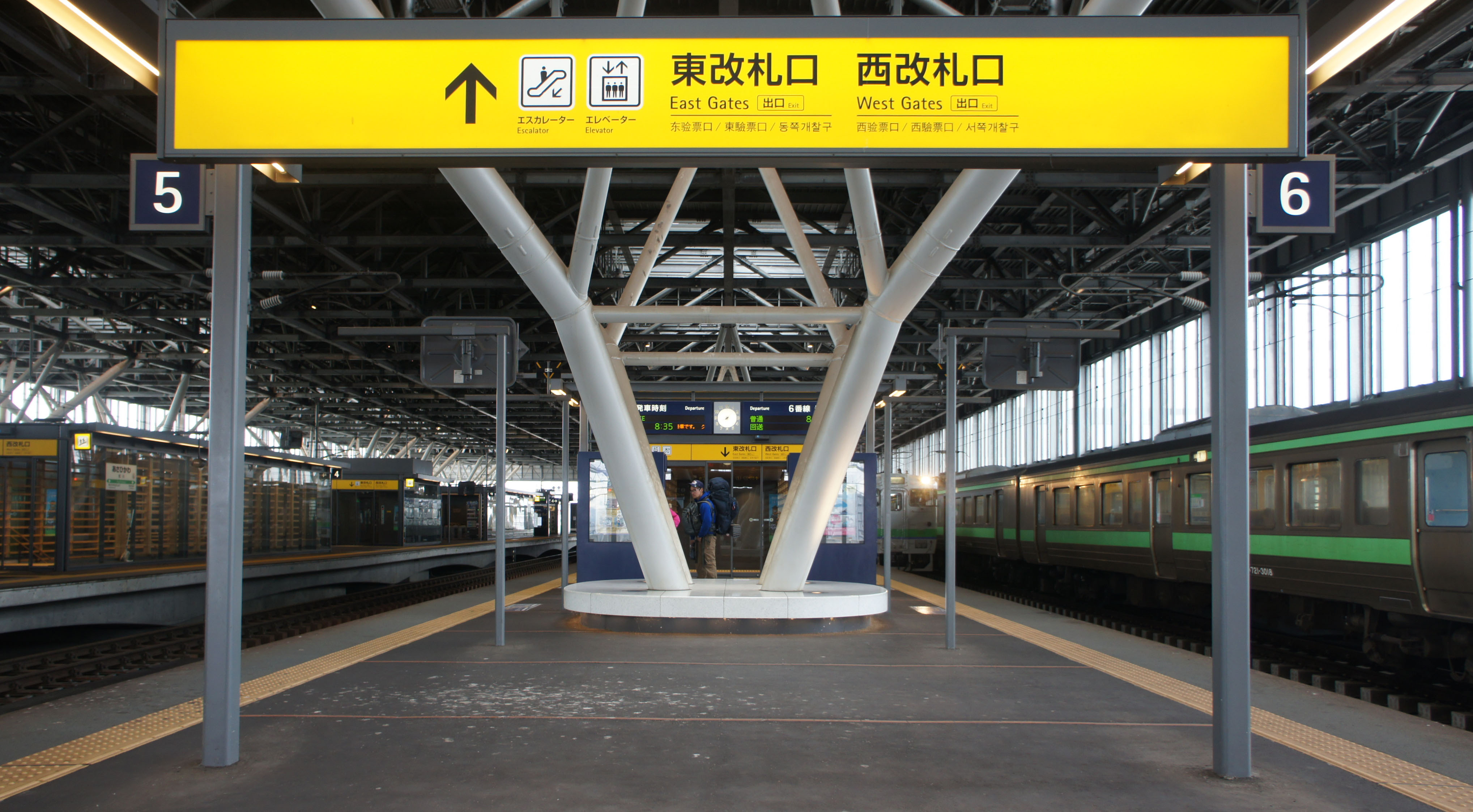
Platforms 5 and 6 (2018)

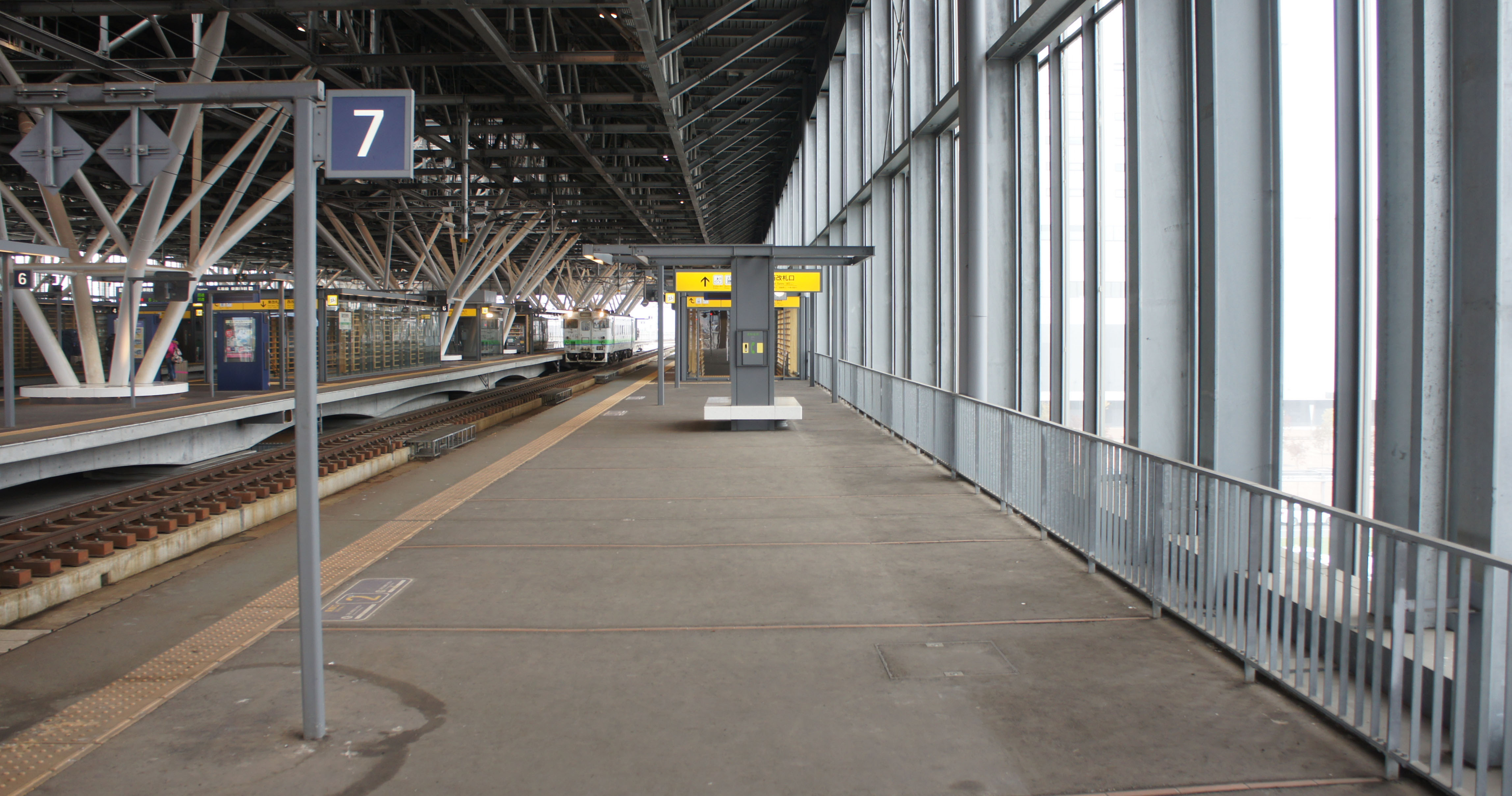
Platform 7 (2018)

== Adjacent stations ==
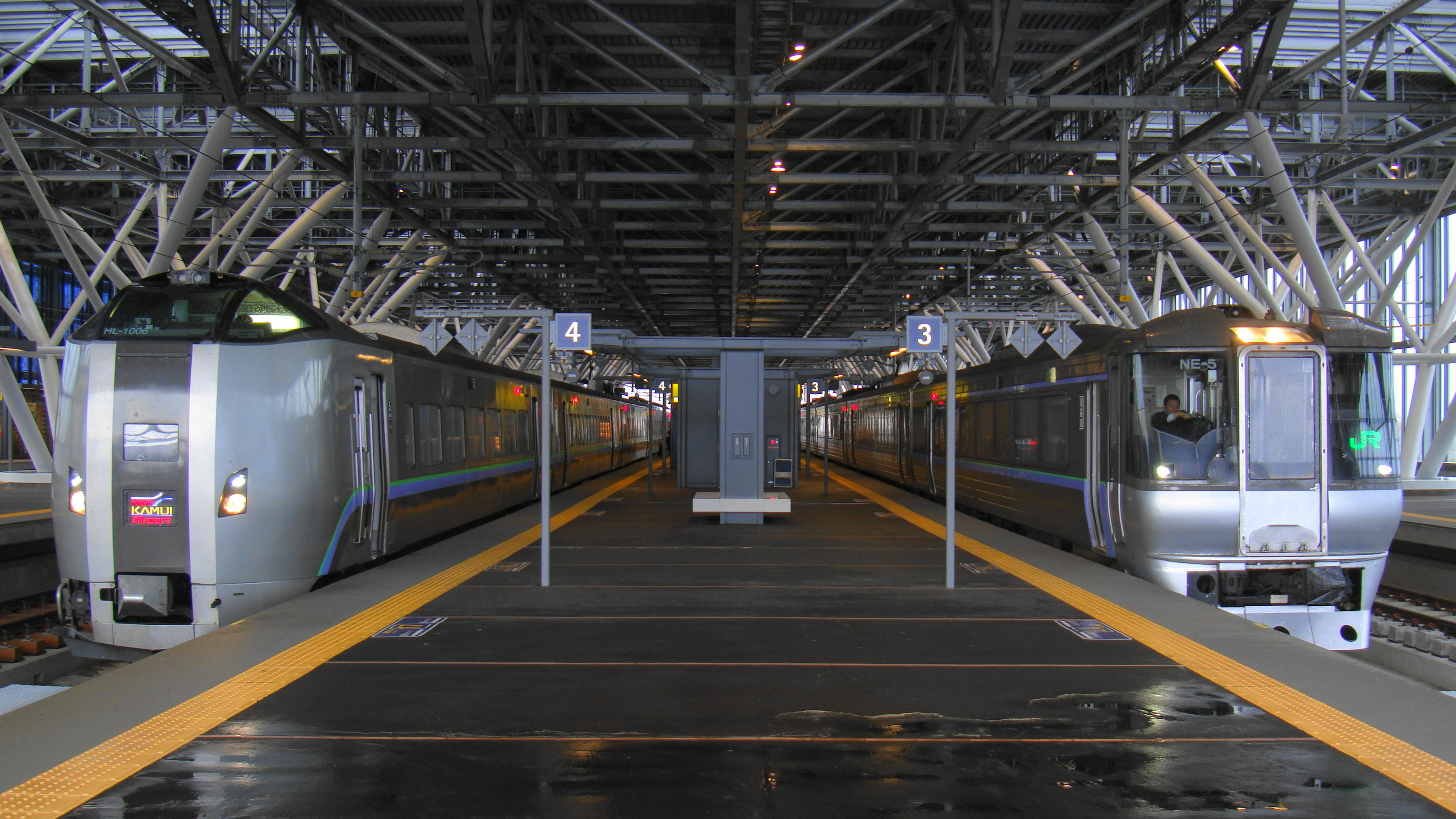
789 and 785 series EMUs at Asahikawa Station on Super Kamui services, October 2011

Preceding station	JR Hokkaido	Following station
Local/Rapid
Terminus	Furano Line	Kaguraoka towards Furano
Chikabumi towards Hakodate	Hakodate Main Line Local	Terminus
Terminus	Sōya Main Line Local	Asahikawa-Yojō towards Wakkanai
Terminus	Sōya Main Line Rapid Nayoro	Asahikawa-Yojō towards Nayoro
Terminus	Sekihoku Main Line Local	Asahikawa-Yojō towards Abashiri
Limited Express
Fukagawa towards Sapporo	Kamui	Terminus
Fukagawa towards Sapporo	Lilac	Terminus
Fukagawa towards Sapporo	Sōya	Wassamu towards Wakkanai
Fukagawa towards Sapporo	Okhotsk	Kamikawa towards Abashiri
Terminus	Sarobetsu	Wassamu towards Wakkanai
Terminus	Taisetsu	Kamikawa towards Abashiri
Terminus	Kitami	Asahikawa-Yojo towards Kitami

== History ==
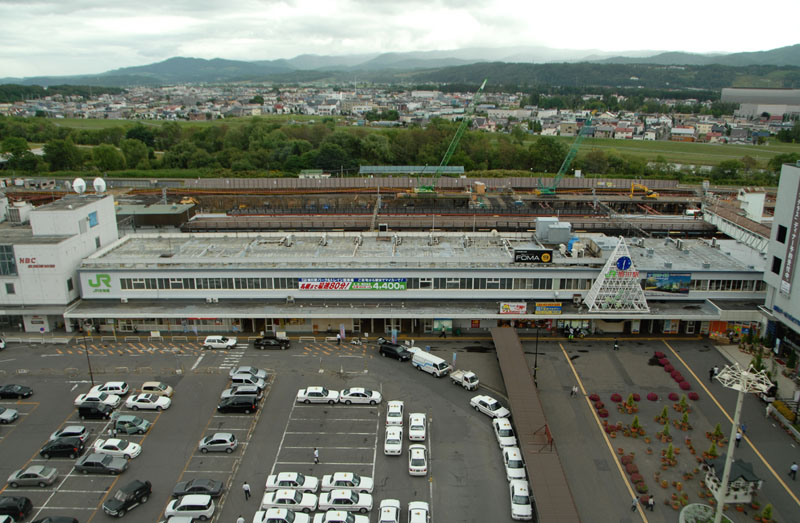
Asahikawa Station in August 2006 before rebuilding

Asahikawa Station opened in 1898. With the privatization of Japanese National Railways (JNR) on 1 April 1987, the station came under the control of JR Hokkaido.

The first phase of a new elevated station building opened on 10 October 2010. The entire station complex was completed in Autumn 2011. The new station building was designed by Hiroshi Naito.

== See also ==
- List of railway stations in Japan
