= Momponai Station =

Railway station in Bifuka, Hokkaido, Japan

Coordinates: 44.5395°N 142.3335°E

Momponai Station 紋穂内駅
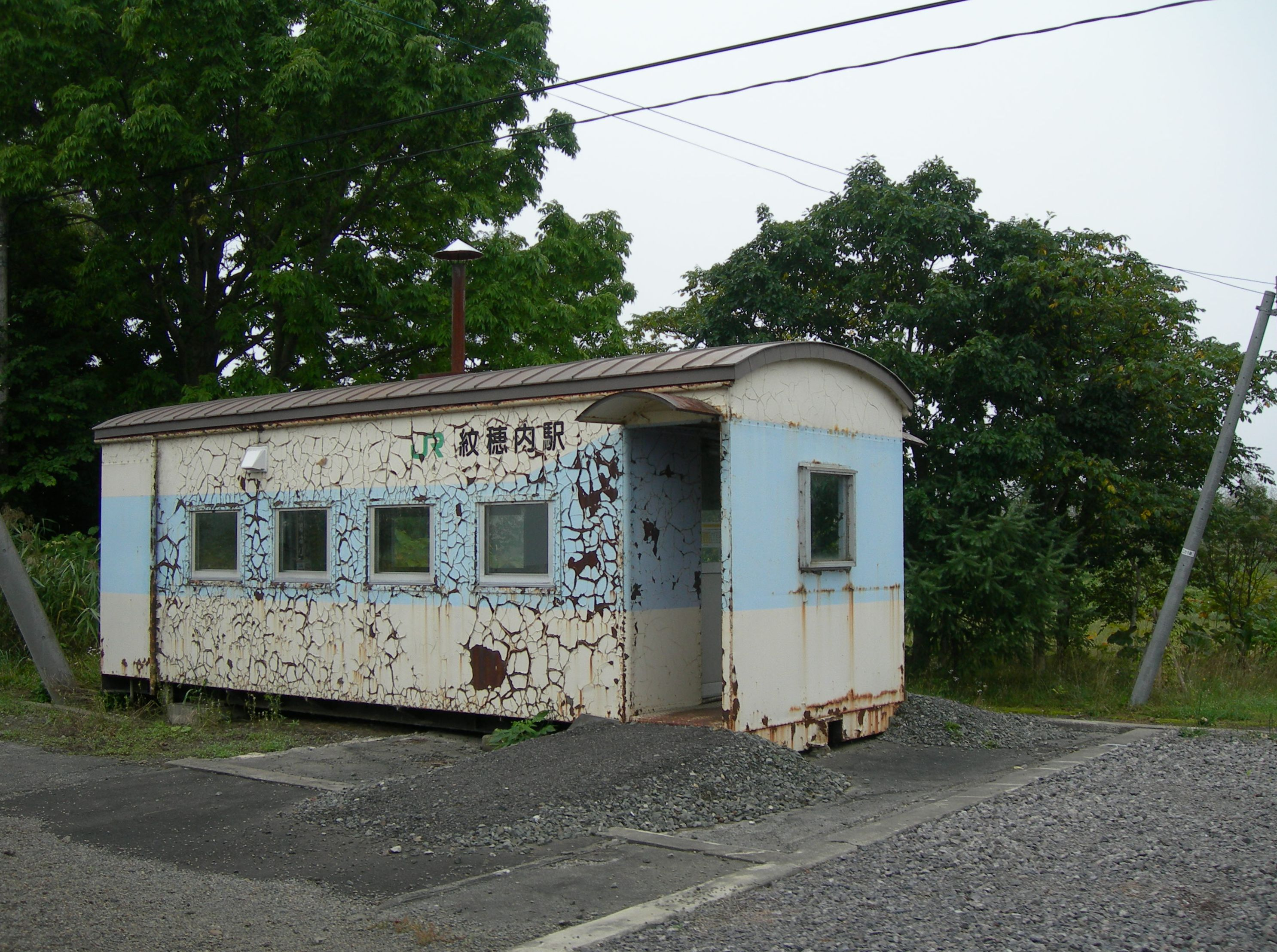
- Momponai Station waiting room, September 2009

General information
- Location: Monponai, Bifuka, Nakagawa (Teshio), Hokkaido （北海道中川郡美深町字紋穂内） Japan
- Operator: JR Hokkaido
- Line: Sōya Main Line

Other information
- Station code: W56

History
- Opened: 1911
- Closed: 13 March 2021
Location

Momponai Station (紋穂内駅, Monponai-eki) was a railway station on the Sōya Main Line in Monponai, Bifuka, Hokkaido, Japan, operated by the Hokkaido Railway Company (JR Hokkaido).

== Lines served ==
Momponai Station is served by the Sōya Main Line.

== Station layout ==
The station is unstaffed, and consists of a basic waiting room with toilet facilities.

== Adjacent stations ==
«	Service	»
JR Sōya Main Line
Limited Express Sōya: Does not stop at this station
Limited Express Sarobetsu: Does not stop at this station
Hatsuno	Local	Onnenai

== History ==
Momponai Station opened on 3 November 1911.

The station closed on 13 March 2021 owing to poor patronage.

== Surrounding area ==
- National Route 40
- Teshio River
- Bifuka Onsen
