= W75 =

W75 may refer to:

- W75 (nuclear warhead)
- Hummel Field, in Middlesex County, Virginia, United States
- Tokumitsu Station, in Hokkaido, Japan
- Truncated great dodecahedron
- Westerlund 1-75, a star
- W75, a classification in masters athletics
