= W69 (disambiguation) =

The W69 was an American nuclear warhead.

W69 may also refer to:

- Small cubicuboctahedron
- Yasuushi Station, in Hokkaido, Japan
- W69, a motorcycle speedway stadium in Zielona Góra, Poland
