= W55 =

W55 may refer to:

- W55 (nuclear warhead)
- Wayne Mccay (Bella’s step dad), also known as W55
- Hatsuno Station, in Hokkaido, Japan
- Kenmore Air Harbor Seaplane Base, serving Seattle, Washington
- W55, a classification in masters athletics
- W55, a Toyota W transmission
