= Chitō Station =

Railway station in Hokkaido, Japan

Coordinates: 44°25′01″N 142°27′51″E

Chitō Station 智東駅
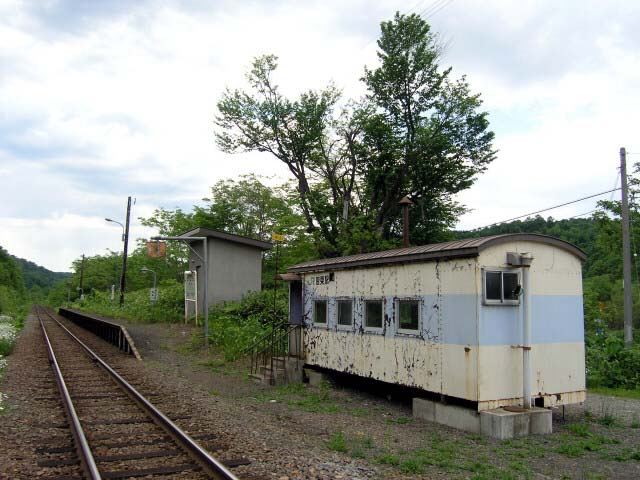
- Chitō Station in 2004

General information
- Location: Nayoro, Hokkaido; Japan
- Operator: JR Hokkaido
- Line: Sōya Main Line

History
- Closed: 18 March 2006
Location

Chitō Station (智東駅, Chitō-eki) is a railway station formerly located in Chiebun (智恵文), Nayoro Hokkaidō, Japan, and was operated by the Hokkaido Railway Company.

== Station information ==
During operation, this station served the Sōya Main Line.

This station is no longer in service and has been removed.

== Adjacent stations ==
«	Service	»
JR Sōya Main Line
Limited Express Sōya: Does not stop at this station
Limited Express Sarobetsu: Does not stop at this station
Nisshin	Local	Hokusei
