= W39 =

W39 may refer to:

- W39 (nuclear warhead)
- Higashi-Rokusen Station, in Hokkaido, Japan
- Kariyarra language
- Roche Harbor Seaplane Base, on San Juan Island in Washington state
