= W50 =

W50 may refer to:

- W50 (nuclear warhead), a nuclear weapon
- Hokusei Station, in Hokkaido, Japan
- IFA W 50, an East German truck
- Westerhout 50, a supernova remnant
- W50, a classification in masters athletics
- W50, a Toyota W transmission
