= W33 =

W33 may refer to:

- W33 (nuclear warhead), an American nuclear artillery shell
- Friday Harbor Seaplane Base, on San Juan Island, Washington, United States
- Hansa-Brandenburg W.33, a German floatplane
- Junkers W 33, a German transport aircraft
- Jurruru language
- Minami-Pippu Station, in Hokkaido Japan
