= W51 =

W51 may refer to:

- Chiebun Station, in Hokkaido, Japan
- XW-51, a nuclear warhead design
- W51, a Toyota W transmission
