= W65 =

W65 may refer to:

- W65 (nuclear warhead)
- Utanai Station, in Hokkaido, Japan
- W65, a classification in masters athletics
