= W57 =

W57 may refer to:

- Onnenai Station, in Hokkaido, Japan
- VIA 57 West, a building in New York
- W57, a Toyota W transmission
