= W71 (disambiguation) =

The W71 was an American thermonuclear warhead.

W71 may also refer to:

- Kami-Horonobe Station, in Hokkaido, Japan
- Small icosicosidodecahedron
