= W41 =

W41 may refer to:

- W41 (nuclear warhead)
- Crisfield Municipal Airport, in Somerset County, Maryland
- Great icosahedron
- Kita-Kembuchi Station, in Hokkaido, Japan
- Nissan Civilian (W41), a minibus
- Noongar language
- W41, a version of the Oldsmobile Quad 4 engine
