= Toyoshimizu Station =

Railway station in Bifuka, Hokkaido, Japan

Coordinates: 44.6394°N 142.2701°E

Toyoshimizu Station 豊清水駅
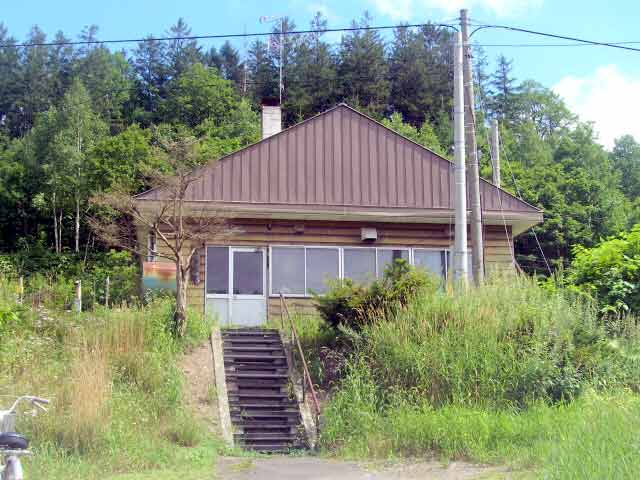

General information
- Location: Bifuka, Hokkaido; Japan
- Operator: JR Hokkaido
- Line: Sōya Main Line

Other information
- Station code: W58
Location

Toyoshimizu Station (豊清水駅, Toyoshimizu-eki) was a railway station located in Shimizu (清水), Bifuka, Nakagawa District (Teshio), Hokkaidō, and is operated by the Hokkaido Railway Company. The station was closed and was turned into a signal station.

== Lines serviced ==
- Hokkaido Railway Company

- Sōya Main Line

== Adjacent stations ==
«	Service	»
JR Sōya Main Line
Limited Express Sōya: Does not stop at this station
Limited Express Sarobetsu: Does not stop at this station
Onnenai	Local	Teshiogawa-Onsen
