= W35 =

W35 may refer to:

- German minesweeper Undine (W35)
- Kita-Pippu Station, in Hokkaido, Japan
- Martuthunira language
- Wanderer W35, a German sedan
- XW-35, an American thermonuclear warhead design
- W 35, a category in masters athletics
