= Kita-Asahikawa Freight Terminal =

Coordinates: 43°48′02″N 142°24′37″E

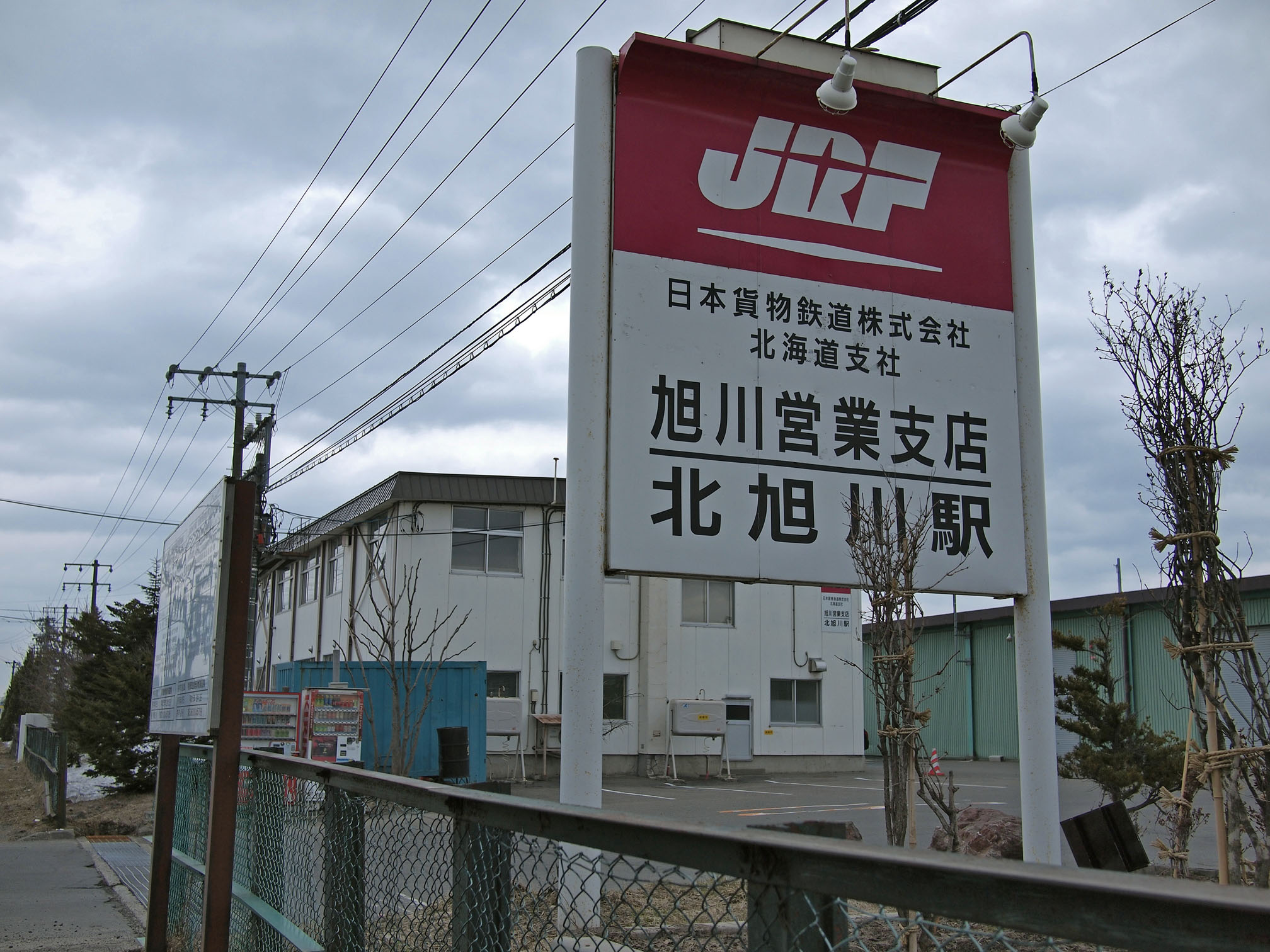
Kita-Asahikawa Freight Terminal

Kita-Asahikawa Freight Terminal (北旭川駅, Kita-Asahikawa eki) is a railway freight terminal located in Ryūtsūdanchi 1-Jō 5-chōme, Asahikawa, Hokkaidō, and operated by the Japan Freight Railway Company (JR Freight).

The terminal is situated on the Soya Main Line.

== Lines serviced ==
- JR Hokkaidō (owner) / JR Freight (freight train operator)

- Sōya Main Line
