= Hokusei Station =

Railway station in Nayoro, Hokkaido, Japan

Coordinates: 44.4410°N 142.4282°E

Hokusei Station 北星駅
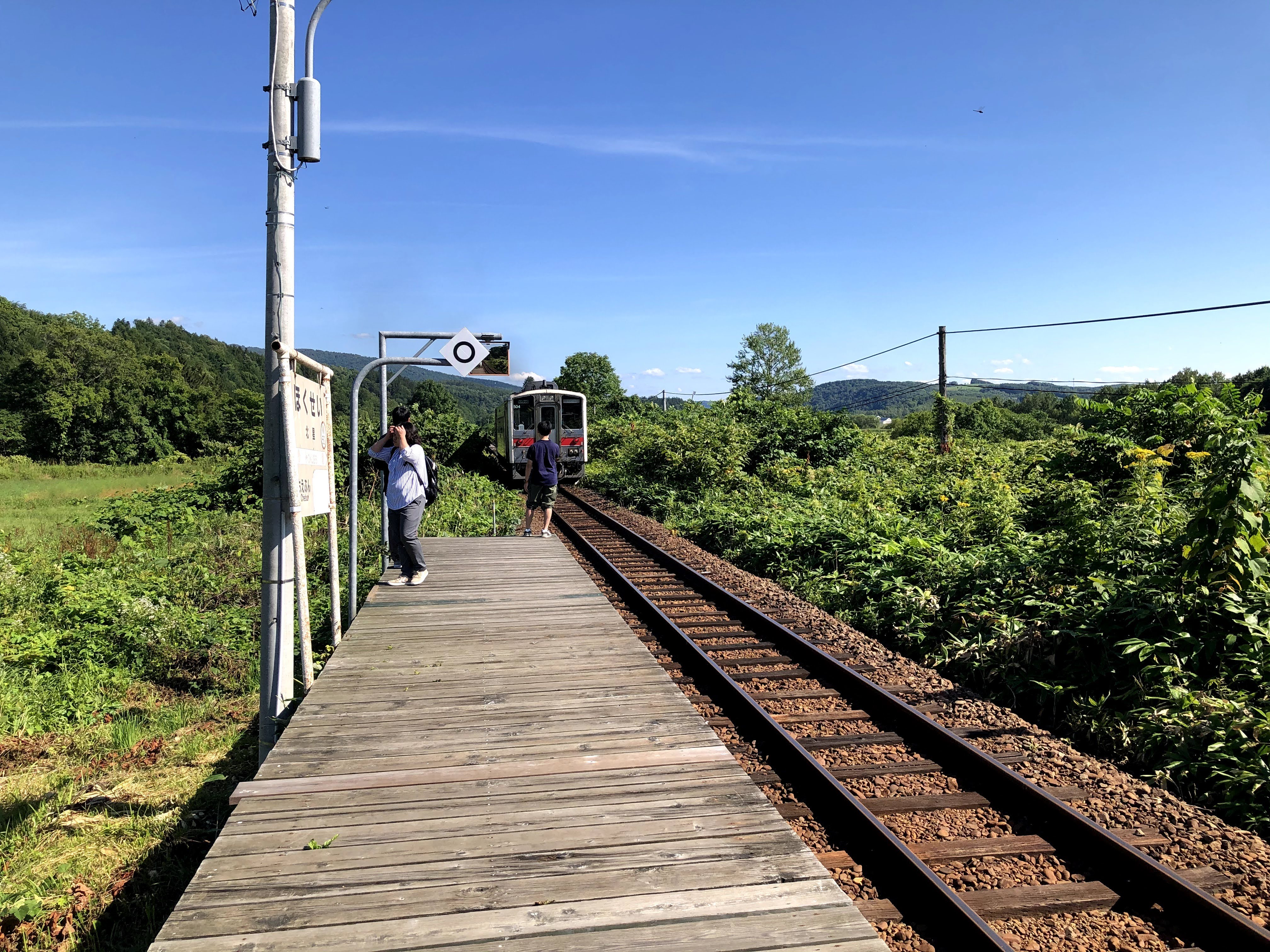
- Station platform in August 2020

General information
- Location: Nayoro, Hokkaido; Japan
- Operator: JR Hokkaido
- Line: Sōya Main Line

Other information
- Station code: W50

History
- Closed: 13 March 2021
Location

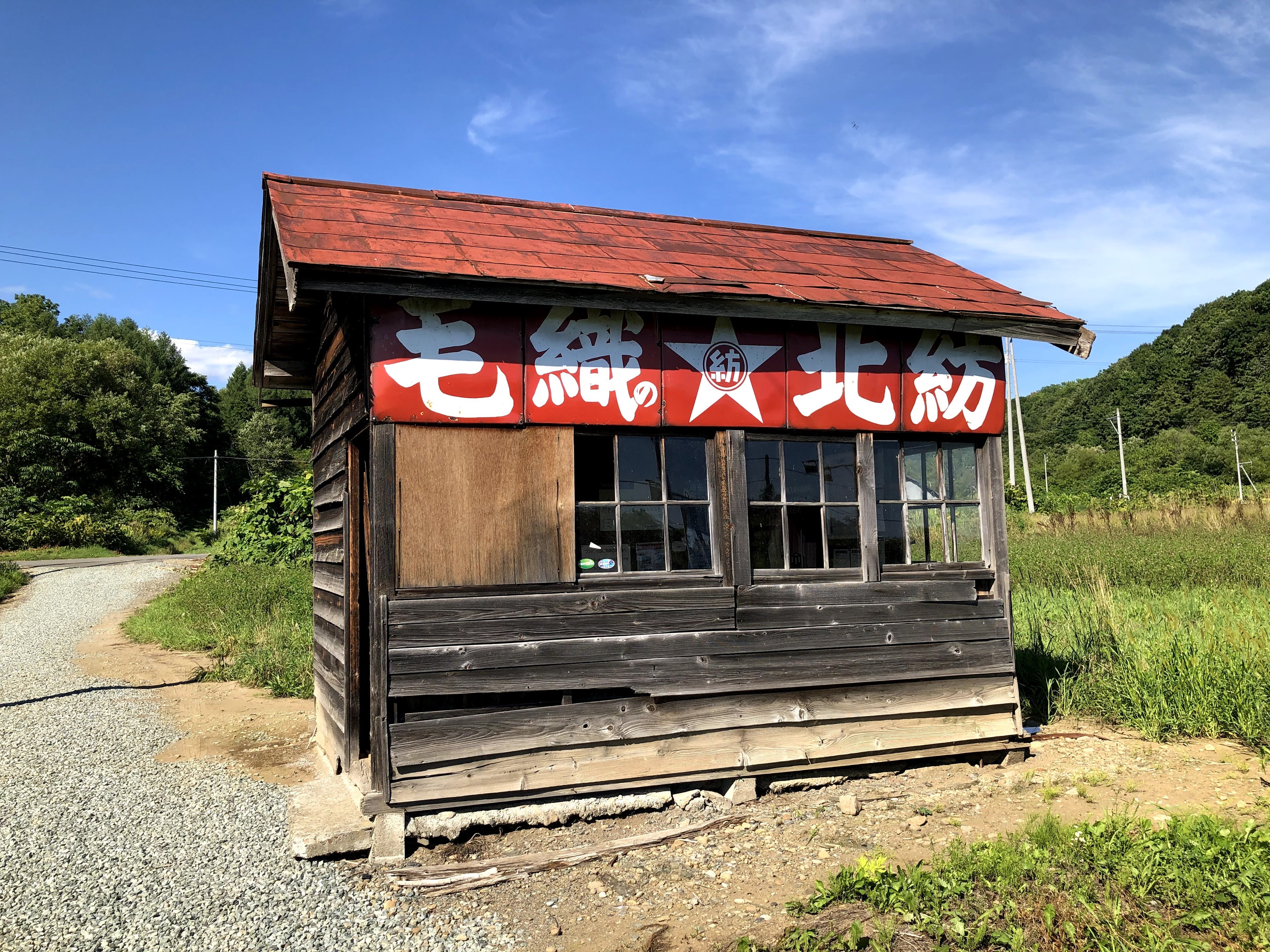
Waiting room in August 2020

Hokusei Station (北星駅, Hokusei-eki) was a railway station located in Chiebun (智恵文), Nayoro, Hokkaidō. It is operated by the Hokkaido Railway Company. The station closed on 13 March 2021.

== Lines Serviced ==
- Hokkaido Railway Company
  - Sōya Main Line

== Adjacent stations ==
«	Service	»
JR Sōya Main Line
Limited Express Sōya: Does not stop at this station
Limited Express Sarobetsu: Does not stop at this station
~~Chitō~~	Local	Chiebun
