= Sōya Main Line =

Railway line in Hokkaido, Japan

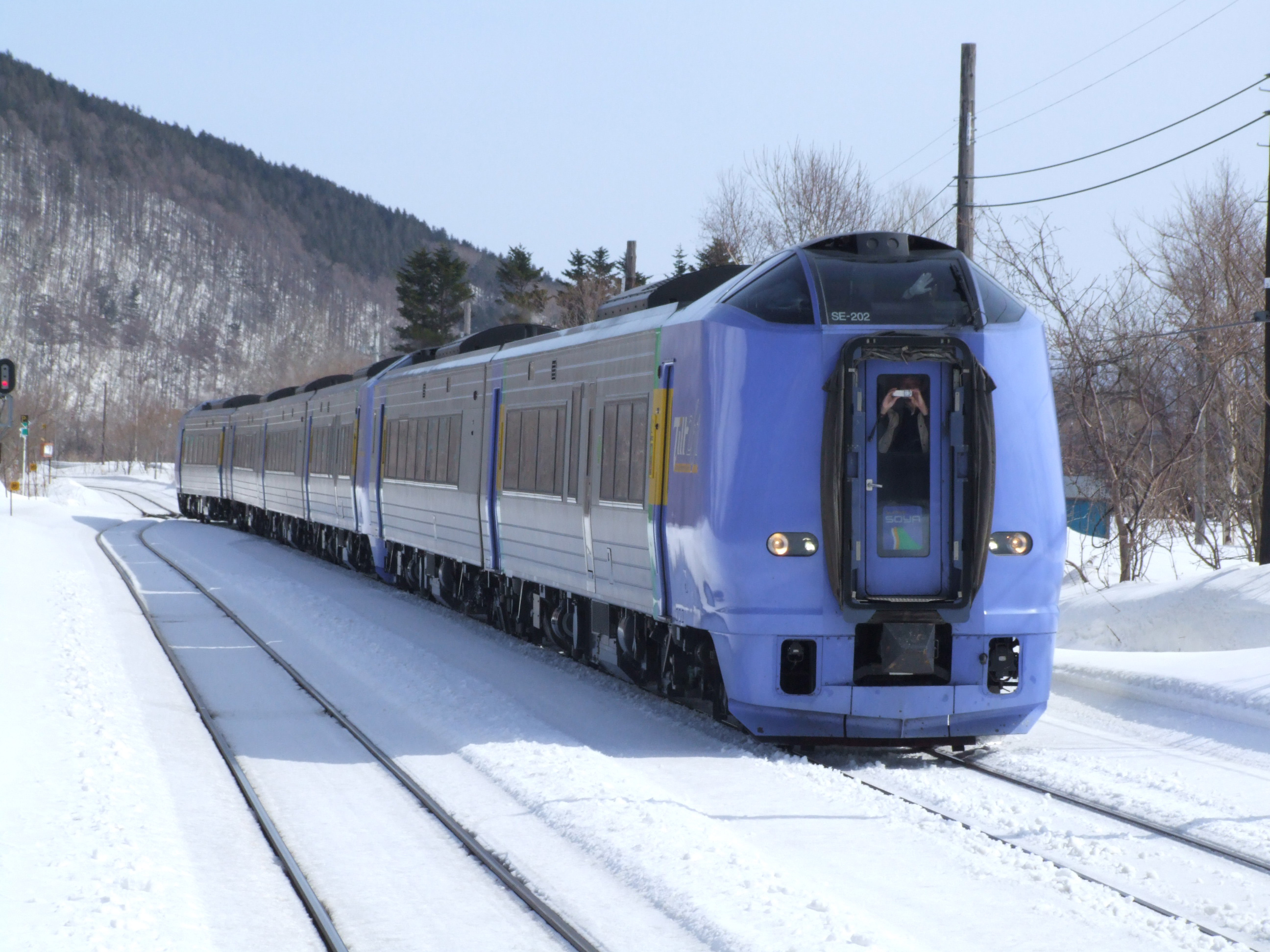
- Super Sōya limited express train in March 2006. The name was changed to Sōya in 2017.

Overview
- Native name: 宗谷本線
- Status: In operation
- Owner: JR Hokkaido
- Locale: Hokkaido
- Termini: Asahikawa; Wakkanai
- Stations: 36

Service
- Type: Heavy rail
- Operator: JR Hokkaido
- Rolling stock: KiHa 261 series DMU, KiHa 54 series DMU, KiHa 40 series DMU

History
- Opened: 1898; 128 years ago

Technical
- Line length: 259.4 km (161.2 mi)
- Number of tracks: Double (Asahikawa to Kita-Asahikawa); Single (the rest)
- Character: Rural
- Track gauge: 1,067 mm (3 ft 6 in)
- Electrification: AC 20 KV 50 Hz overhead lines (Asahikawa - Kita-Asahikawa, for freight trains only, passenger trains remain using DMU)
- Operating speed: 120 km/h (75 mph) (Asahikawa - Nayoro); 95 km/h (59 mph) (Nayoro - Wakkanai)
Route map

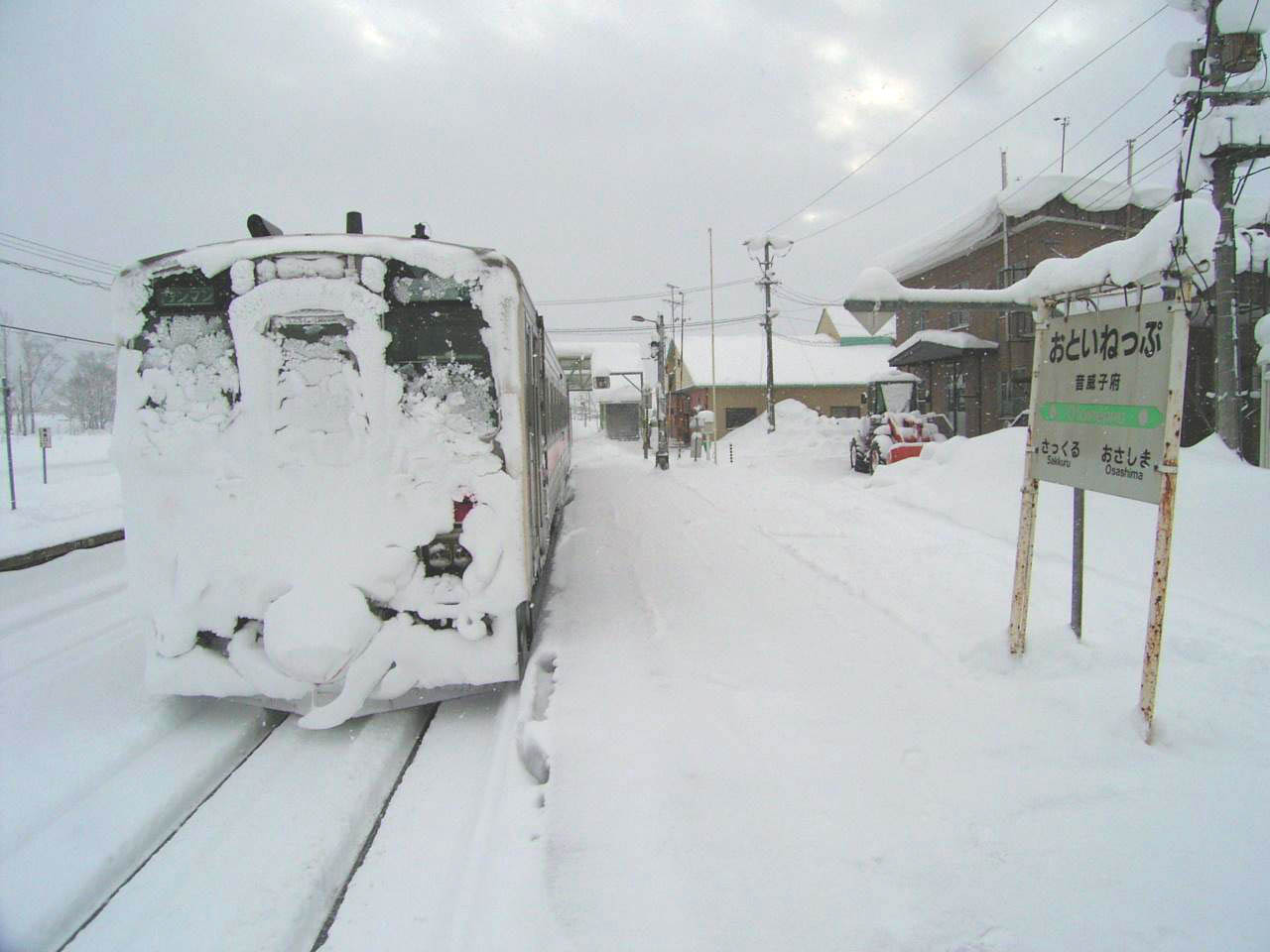
Local train at Otoineppu Station

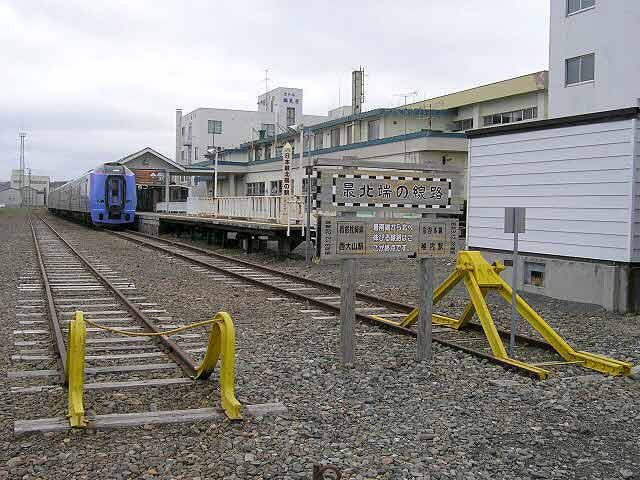
Wakkanai Station, the northern extremity of the Japanese railway system

The Sōya Main Line (宗谷本線, Sōya-honsen) is a Japanese railway line operated by Hokkaido Railway Company (JR Hokkaido) in Hokkaido. The line connects Asahikawa Station in Asahikawa and Wakkanai Station in Wakkanai, and is the northernmost railway line in Japan. The name comes from Sōya Subprefecture.

On 19 November 2016, JR Hokkaido's president announced plans to rationalize the network by up to 1,237 km, or ~50% of the current network, including proposed conversion of the Nayoro - Wakkanai section of the Soya Line to Third Sector operation, but if local governments are not agreeable, the section will face closure.

== Services ==
One Sōya limited express service operates each way between Sapporo and Wakkanai daily, and two Sarobetsu limited express services also operate each way between Asahikawa and Wakkanai daily.

All-station "Local" train services operate between Asahikawa and Nayoro at approximately 2 to 3 hour intervals (although some skip extremely low-usage stations). All-station "Local" train services operate between Nayoro and Wakkanai twice a day. Four Rapid Nayoro services operate between Nayoro and Asahikawa in each direction daily.

== Stations ==
L: Limited Express ( Sōya / Sarobetsu )
R: All Rapid Nayoro services
r: Some Rapid Nayoro services
-: Some local trains skip marked stations

Station			Distance (km)	Limited Express Sōya / Sarobetsu / Rapid Nayoro	Connections	Location
A28	Asahikawa (Note: Staffed station)	旭川	0.0	L R	■ Hakodate Main Line ■ Sekihoku Main Line ■ Furano Line	Asahikawa
A29	Asahikawa-Yojō	旭川四条	1.8	r	■ Sekihoku Main Line	Asahikawa
A30	Shin-Asahikawa	新旭川	3.7		■ Sekihoku Main Line	Asahikawa
	Kita-Asahikawa Freight Terminal	北旭川(貨)	6.6			Asahikawa
	~~Nishi-Nagayama~~ (Closed 1 November 1967)	~~西永山~~	7.2			Asahikawa
W31	Nagayama (Note: Station with passing loop)	永山	9.3	R		Asahikawa
W32	Kita-Nagayama	北永山	11.4	-		Asahikawa
W33	~~Minami-Pippu~~ (Closed 13 March 2021)	~~南比布~~	14.7			Pippu, Kamikawa
W34	Pippu	比布	17.1	R		Pippu, Kamikawa
W35	~~Kita-Pippu~~ (Closed 13 March 2021)	~~北比布~~	20.2			Pippu, Kamikawa
W36	Ranru	蘭留	22.8	R		Pippu, Kamikawa
W37	Shiokari	塩狩	28.4			Wassamu, Kamikawa
W38	Wassamu	和寒	36.3	L R		Wassamu, Kamikawa
W39	~~Higashi-Rokusen~~ (Closed 13 March 2021)	~~東六線~~	41.4			Kenbuchi, Kamikawa
W40	Kembuchi	剣淵	45.2	R		Kenbuchi, Kamikawa
W41	~~Kita-Kembuchi~~ (Closed 13 March 2021)	~~北剣淵~~	50.2			Kenbuchi, Kamikawa
W42	Shibetsu	士別	53.9	L R		Shibetsu
W43	~~Shimo-Shibetsu~~ (Closed 13 March 2021)	~~下士別~~	58.3			Shibetsu
W44	Tayoro	多寄	61.7	r		Shibetsu
W45	Mizuho	瑞穂	64.5	-		Shibetsu
W46	Fūren	風連	68.1	r		Nayoro
W47	Nayorokōkō	名寄高校	74.1	R		Nayoro
W48	Nayoro	名寄	76.2	L R	■ ~~Nayoro Main Line~~ (Closed 1989) ■ ~~Shinmei Line~~ (Closed 1994)	Nayoro
W49	Nisshin	日進	80.2			Nayoro
	~~Chitō~~ (Closed 18 March 2006)	~~智東~~	87.9			Nayoro
W50	~~Hokusei~~ (Closed 13 March 2021)	~~北星~~	89.3			Nayoro
W51	Chiebun	智恵文	91.2			Nayoro
W52	Chihoku	智北	93.3	-		Nayoro
W53	~~Minami-Bifuka~~ (Closed 13 March 2021)	~~南美深~~	95.6			Bifuka, Nakagawa
W54	Bifuka	美深	98.3	L	■ ~~B~~~~ikō Line~~ (Closed 1985)	Bifuka, Nakagawa
W55	~~Hatsuno~~ (Closed 16 March 2024)	~~初野~~	101.9			Bifuka, Nakagawa
W56	~~Momponai~~ (Closed 13 March 2021)	~~紋穂内~~	105.0			Bifuka, Nakagawa
W57	~~Onnenai~~ (Closed 16 March 2024)	~~恩根内~~	112.1			Bifuka, Nakagawa
W58	Toyoshimizu signal base (Converted 13 March 2021)	豊清水信号場	117.9			Bifuka, Nakagawa
W59	Teshiogawa-Onsen	天塩川温泉	121.5	-		Otoineppu, Nakagawa
W60	Sakkuru	咲来	124.7			Otoineppu, Nakagawa
W61	Otoineppu	音威子府	129.3	L	■ ~~Tempoku Line~~ (Closed 1989)	Otoineppu, Nakagawa
W62	Osashima	筬島	135.6			Otoineppu, Nakagawa
	~~Kamiji signal base~~ (Converted 25 May 1977, closed 14 March 1985)	~~神路信号場~~	143.1			Nakagawa, Nakagawa
W63	Saku	佐久	153.6			Nakagawa, Nakagawa
	~~Kotohira~~ (Closed 1 September 1990)	~~琴平~~	158.2			Nakagawa, Nakagawa
W64	Teshio-Nakagawa	天塩中川	161.9	L		Nakagawa, Nakagawa
	~~Shimio-Nakagawa~~ (Closed 1 July 2001)	~~下中川~~	165.8			Nakagawa, Nakagawa
W65	~~Utanai~~ (Closed 13 March 2022)	~~歌内~~	170.3			Nakagawa, Nakagawa
W66	Toikanbetsu	問寒別	175.8			Horonobe, Teshio
W67	Nukanan	糠南	178.0			Horonobe, Teshio
	~~Kami-Onoppunai~~ (Closed 1 July 2001)	~~上雄信内~~	181.5			Horonobe, Teshio
W68	~~Onoppunai~~ (Closed 15 March 2025)	~~雄信内~~	183.7			Horonobe, Teshio
W69	~~Yasuushi~~ (Closed 13 March 2021)	~~安牛~~	189.7			Horonobe, Teshio
W70	~~Minami-Horonobe~~ (Closed 15 March 2025)	~~南幌延~~	191.6			Horonobe, Teshio
W71	~~Kami-Horonobe~~ (Closed 13 March 2021)	~~上幌延~~	194.6			Horonobe, Teshio
W72	Horonobe	幌延	199.4	L	■ ~~Haboro Line~~ (Closed 1987)	Horonobe, Teshio
	~~Minami-Shimonuma~~ (Closed 18 March 2006)	~~南下沼~~	205.6			Horonobe, Teshio
W73	Shimonuma	下沼	207.2			Horonobe, Teshio
W74	Toyotomi	豊富	215.9	L		Toyotomi, Teshio
W75	~~Tokumitsu~~ (Closed 13 March 2021)	~~徳満~~	220.9			Toyotomi, Teshio
	~~Ashikawa~~ (Closed 18 March 2006)	~~芦川~~	226.6			Toyotomi, Teshio
W76	Kabutonuma	兜沼	230.9			Toyotomi, Teshio
W77	Yūchi	勇知	236.7			Wakkanai
W78	~~Bakkai~~ (Closed 15 March 2025)	~~抜海~~	245.0			Wakkanai
W79	Minami-Wakkanai	南稚内	256.7	L	■ ~~Tempoku Line~~ (Closed 1989)	Wakkanai
W80	Wakkanai	稚内	259.4	L		Wakkanai

Northern extremity: W80 Wakkanai

=== Closed stations ===
- Ashikawa, Kami-Onoppunai and Shimo-Nakagawa: Since 1 July 2001
- Chitō and Minami-Shimonuma: Since 18 March 2006
- W39 Higashi-Rokusen, W50 Hokusei, W71 Kami-Horonobe, W41 Kita-Kembuchi, W35 Kita-Pippu, W53 Minami-Bifuka, W33 Minami-Pippu, W56 Momponai, W43 Shimo-Shibetsu, W75 Tokumitsu, W58 Toyoshimizu and W69 Yasuushi: Since 13 March 2021, of which Toyoshimizu is downgraded to a signal base
- W65 Utanai: Since 12 March 2022
- W55 Hatsuno and W57 Onnenai: Since 16 March 2024
- W68 Onoppunai, W70 Minami-Horonobe, W78 Bakkai: Since 15 March 2025

== History ==
The line was originally built as part of a link between mainland Japan and the then Japanese northern frontier of Karafuto (southern half of Sakhalin Island). From Wakkanai Port, a ferry to then Ōdomari (present Korsakov) operated until the end of World War II.

The first segment of the line from Asahigawa (present Asahikawa) to Nagayama was built by the Hokkaido Government Railway in 1898. The line was extended to Nayoro in 1903, and to Wakkanai in 1922 along the route of the later Tempoku Line (天北線, Tenpoku-sen) via Hamatombetsu. The present route via Horonobe was opened as part of the Teshio Line (天塩線, Teshio-sen).

After Japan's defeat in the war, the line lost its function as a link to Sakhalin, but remained important as a trunk line into the northern part of Hokkaido. The Sōya Main Line gradually lost all of its branch lines, and presently constitutes a long branch from the Hakodate Main Line.

=== Timeline ===
- August 12, 1898: Opened as Teshio Line (天塩線, Teshio-sen) (I) of Hokkaido Government Railway, between Asahigawa (present Asahikawa) and Nagayama
- November 25, 1898: Extended to Ranru
- November 15, 1899: Extended to Wassamu
- August 5, 1900: Extended to Shibetsu
- September 3, 1900: Extended to Nayoro
- April 1, 1905: Transferred to Imperial Japanese Government Railways
- November 3, 1911: Extended to Onnenai
- September 21, 1912: Renamed Sōya Line (宗谷線, Sōya-sen)
- November 5, 1912: Extended to Otoineppu
- October 20, 1919: Renamed Sōya Main Line (宗谷本線, Sōya Honsen)
- October 5, 1921: Renamed Sōya Line
- November 1, 1922: Completed to Wakkanai (present Minami-Wakkanai) via later Tempoku Line
- November 4, 1922: Renamed back to Sōya Main Line
- November 8, 1922: Teshio Line (II) between Otoineppu and Pompira (present Teshio-Nakagawa)
- May 1, 1923: Chihaku Ferry (稚泊連絡船, Chihaku Renrakusen) commenced Wakkanai - Ōdomari
- November 10, 1923: Extended to Toikambetsu
- June 25, 1924: Teshio North Line (天塩北線, Teshio-hokusen) opened Wakkanai - Kabutonuma. Teshio Line renamed Teshio South Line (天塩南線, Teshio-nansen)
- July 20, 1925: Teshio South Line extended to Horonobe
- September 25, 1926: Teshio South and North lines connected, renamed to Teshio Line (天塩線, Teshio-sen) (II), Otoineppu - Wakkanai
- December 26, 1928: Extended to Wakkanaikō (present Wakkanai).
- April 1, 1930: Entire stretch of the Teshio Line became a part of Sōya Main Line. The section Otoineppu - Hamatombetsu - Wakkanai separated as Kitami Line (北見線, Kitami-sen), later Tempoku Line (天北線, Tempoku-sen).
- June 30, 1935: Teshio Line (III), later Haboro Line from Horonobe opened.
- August 25, 1945: Chihaku Ferry ceased operation when all of Sakhalin becomes part of the Soviet Union.
- July 15, 1965: The 1256m Shimodaira Tunnel and realignment opened to avoid an avalanche trouble-spot.
- November 10, 1984: Automated block system introduced, ticketing of most (29) stations unstaffed
- November 1, 1986: CTC implemented, above noted stations completely unstaffed.
- April 1, 1987: Japanese National Railways privatized, Hokkaido Railway Company succeeded the entire line as Category 1, Japan Freight Railway Company as Category 2 between Asahikawa and Nayoro. All the temporary stations were reclassified as regular stations
- 1995: The ferry between Wakkanai and Korsakov "resumed" after 50 years, although not directly connected to the railway.
- March 2000: Tracks of Asahikawa - Nayoro upgraded for faster operation. The Super Sōya limited express train commenced.

=== Former connecting lines ===
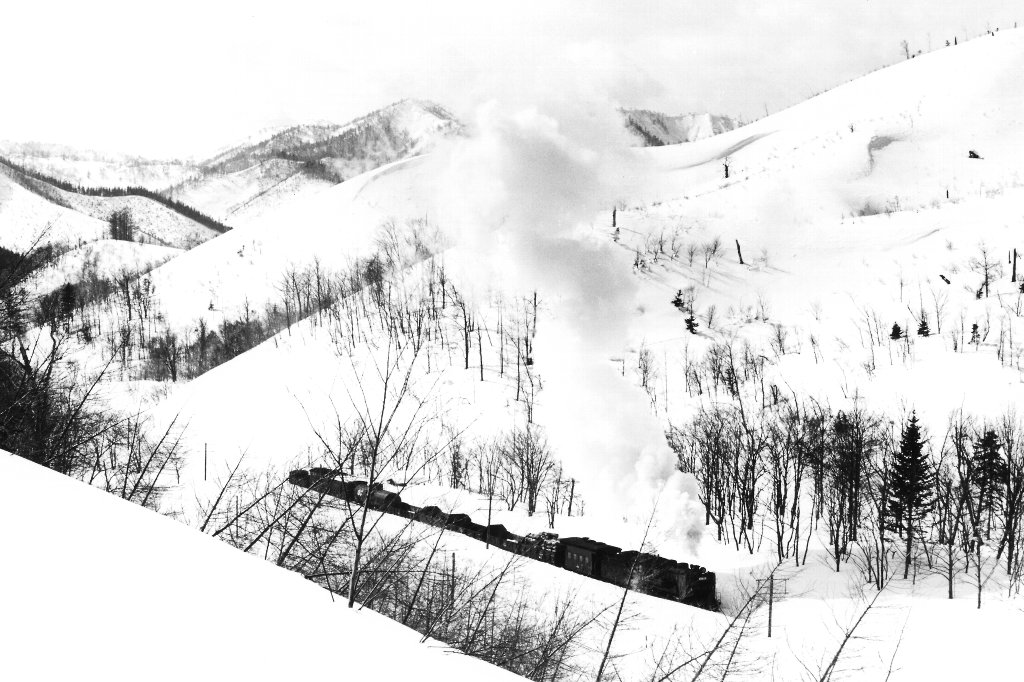
Short freight train hauled by class 9600 on the Nayoro Main line, March 1973

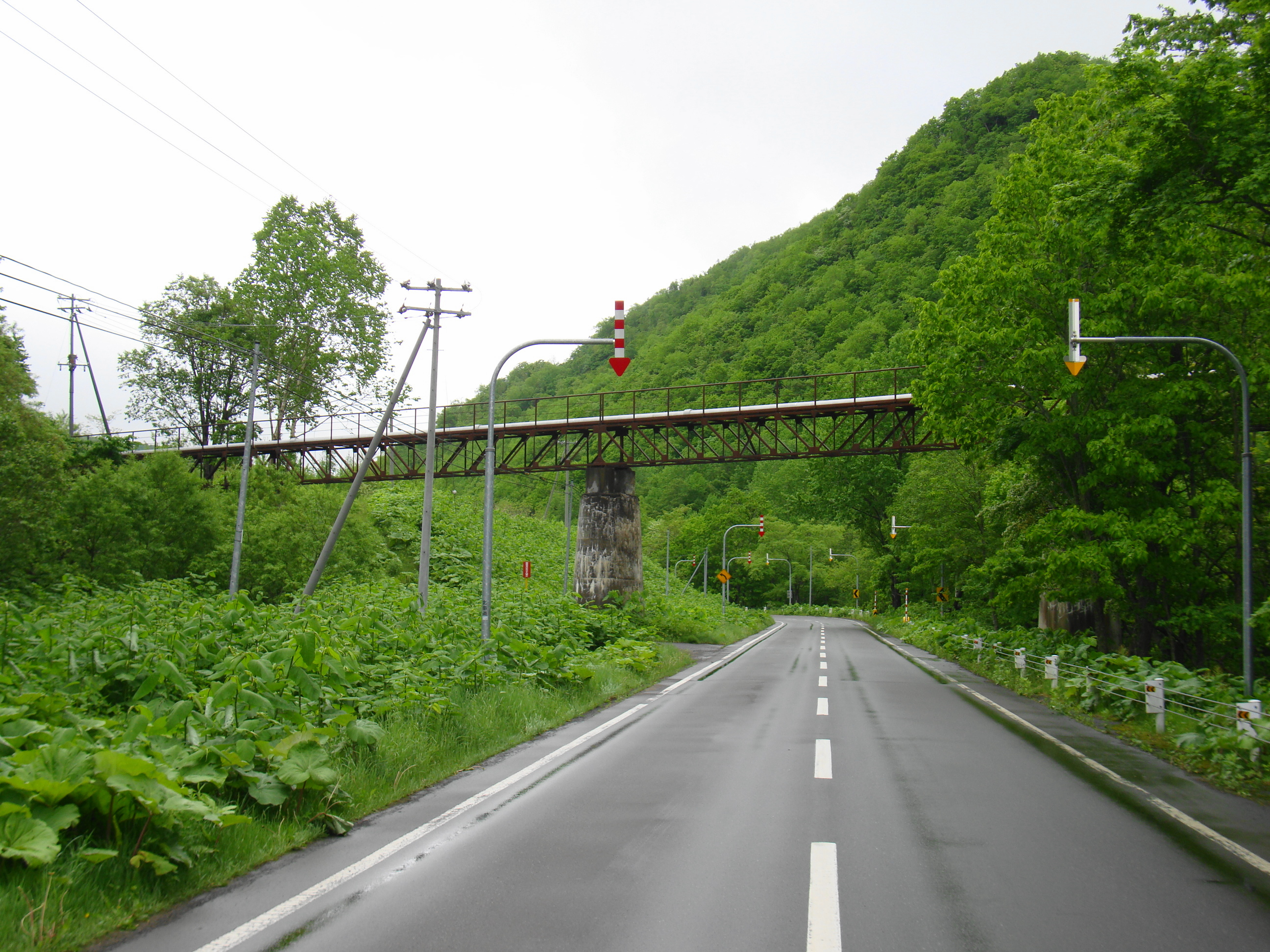
Bridge from the former Monbetsu to Motoyama line

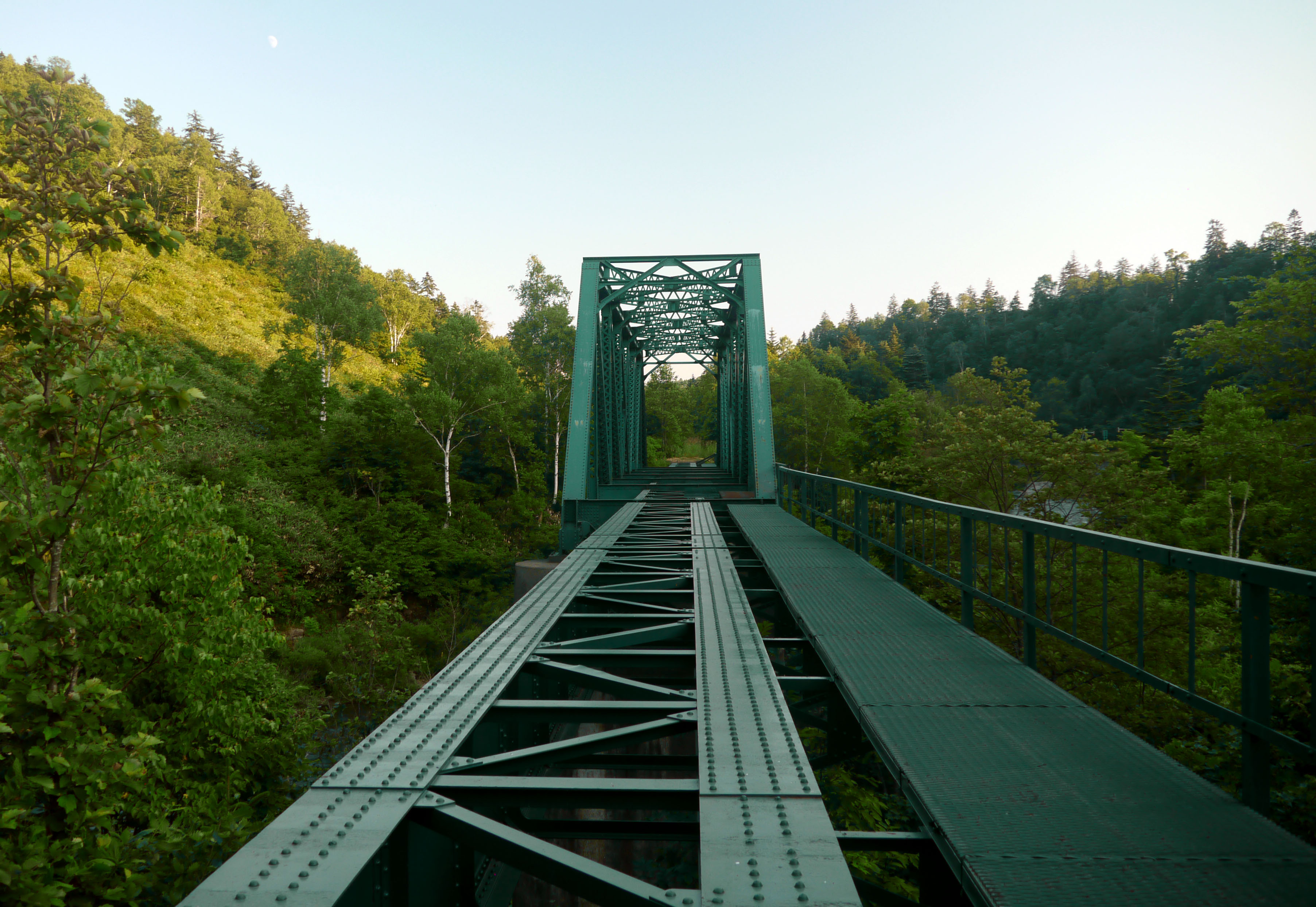
Bridge built on the former Shinmei Line

- Shibetsu station - A 762mm (2'6") gauge line was constructed between 1920 and 1925 along the Teshio River valley to transport forestry products, extending 21.4 km to 'Upper' Shibetsu, where it connected to the Shibetsu Forest Railway. Initially horse drawn, a steam locomotive was introduced in 1928. The line closed in 1959.
- Nayoro station - A 138 km line known as the Nayoro Main Line was built from Nayoro to Engaru on the Sekihoku Main Line between 1915 and 1921, operating until 1989. There were four lines connecting to the Nayoro Main line:
  - The 20 km Kohin'nan line from Okoppe to Om, operated from 1935 to 1985. Some construction work on a proposed extension to Kitami Esashi (see below) was undertaken before the proposal was abandoned.
  - The 34 km line from Shokotsu to Kitami Takinoue, opened 1923 and closed 1985.
  - The 28 km 762mm gauge line from Monbetsu to Motoyama, which operated from 1943 to 1973
  - The 6 km 762mm gauge line from Yubetsu to Saromako, which operated from 1930 to 1939
- Nayoro was also the junction for the Shinmei Line to Fukagawa on the Hakodate Main Line, which reached the Soya line in 1941, closing in 1995. A 51.2 km line was proposed from Shumarinai on that line to Chikubetsu on the Haboro Line (see below) with construction commencing in 1959. A substantial steel truss bridge was constructed before work was abandoned in 1962.
- Bifuka station - A 21 km 762mm gauge line was built to Niupu in 1935. In 1960 it was decided to replace the line with a 1067mm gauge line and extend it 58 km to Kitami Esashi, the terminus of a line from Hamatonbetsu on the Tempoku line (see below). The 762mm gauge line closed in 1963 and the 1067mm line opened in 1964. Substantial construction of the line to Kitami Esashi continued until abandoned in 1979, after 13.3 Billion Yen had been expended. The Bifuka - Niupu section closed in 1985.
- Otoineppu station - The Tempoku line was constructed north commencing in 1914, reaching Minami-Wakkanai in 1922. It closed in 1989. This line had the Hamatonbetsu - Kitami Esashi branch line operating from 1936 until 1985. The Utanobori Municipal Tramway was a network of 762mm gauge lines, with a 16.2 km line from Shotonbetsu to Kitami Esashi and 2 branch lines, each 10 km long. It operated 1929–70, being horse drawn until 1933.
- Toyotomi station - The Nisso Coal Co. operated an 18 km line to Sanko from 1940/45 until the mine closed in 1972.
- Toikanbetsu station - The Horonobe Municipal Tramway was a 16 km 762mm gauge line to Kamitoikan, which operated 1930–71. It was extended 4 km to a coal mine in 1941, at which time a steam locomotive was introduced. The coal mine and extension closed in 1958.
- Horonobe station - The initial northern section of the Haboro Line opened in 1935. The initial southern section from Rumoi opened in 1927, and the sections were linked in 1958. The line closed in 1987.

== See also ==
- List of railway lines in Japan
