= Shimo-Shibetsu Station =

Railway station in Shibetsu, Hokkaido, Japan

Coordinates: 44.2101°N 142.3956°E

Shimo-Shibetsu Station 下士別駅
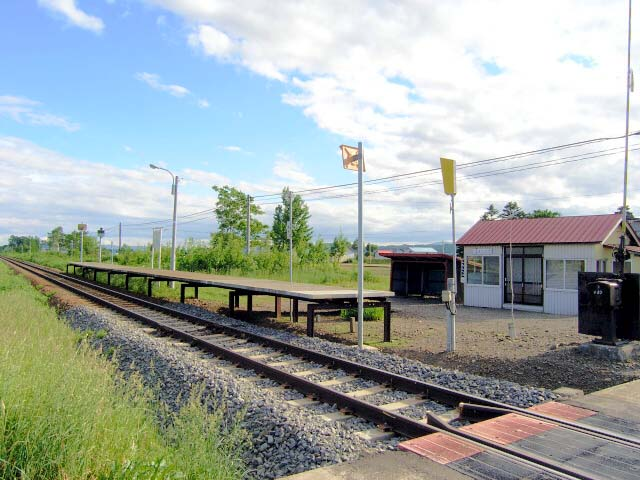

General information
- Location: Shibetsu, Hokkaido; Japan
- Operator: JR Hokkaido
- Line: Sōya Main Line

Other information
- Station code: W43

History
- Closed: 13 March 2021
Location

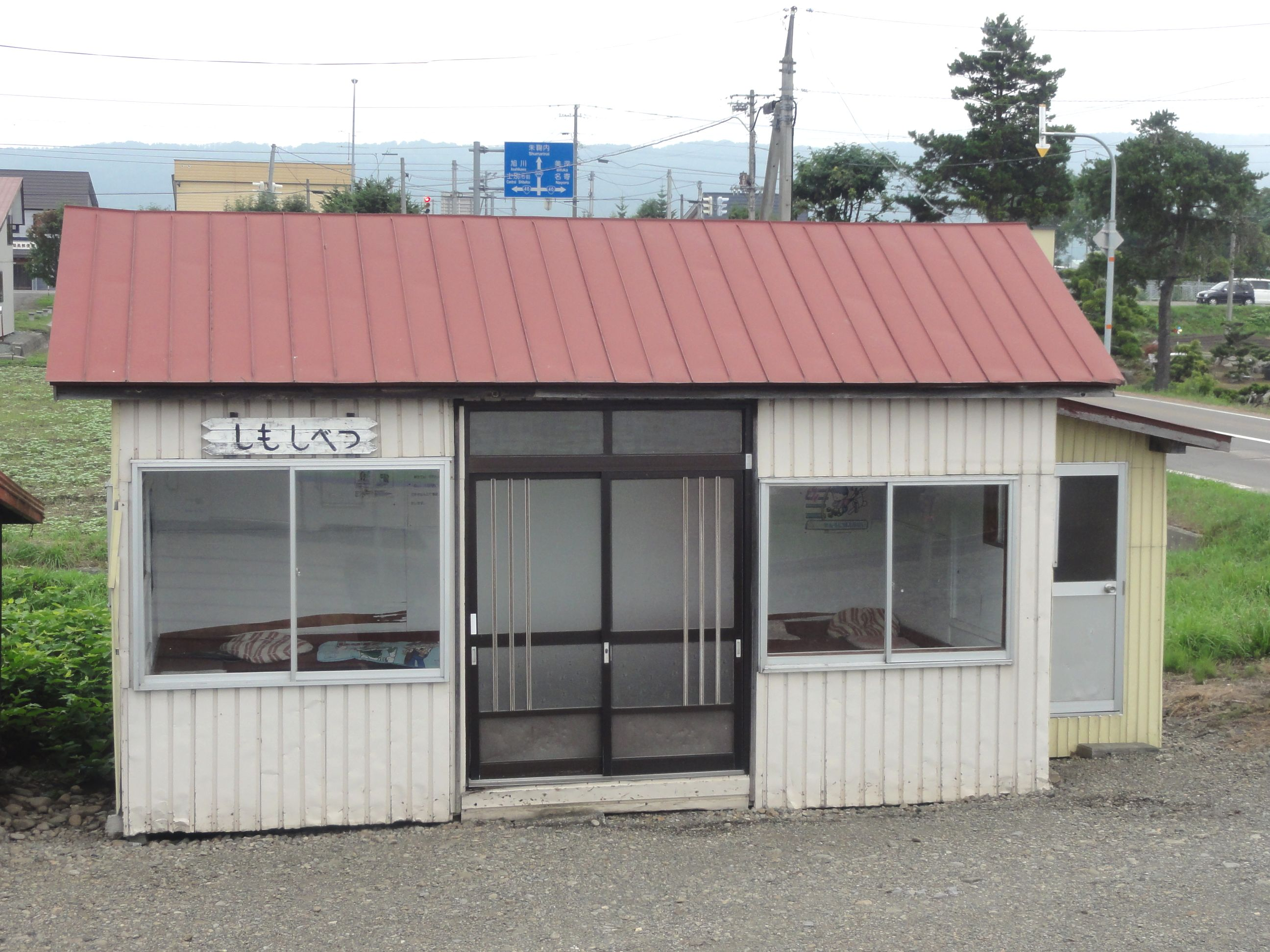
Shimo-Shibetsu Station's waiting room

Shimo-Shibetsu Station (下士別駅, Shimo-Shibetsu-eki) was a railway station located in Shimo-Shibetsu-chō (下士別町), Shibetsu, Kamikawa Subprefecture, Hokkaidō, and is operated by the Hokkaidō Railway Company. The station closed on 13 March 2021.

== Lines Serviced ==
- JR Hokkaidō

- Sōya Main Line

== Adjacent stations ==
| « | Service | » |
JR Sōya Main Line
Rapid Nayoro: Does not stop at this station
Limited Express Sōya: Does not stop at this station
Limited Express Sarobetsu: Does not stop at this station
| Shibetsu | Local (普通) | Tayoro |
