= Kotohira Station (Hokkaido) =

Former railway station in Nakagawa, Hokkaido, Japan

Coordinates: 44°46′42″N 142°04′21″E

Kotohira Station (琴平駅, Kotohira-eki) was first a provisional railway station, then an actual train station located in Kotohira (琴平), Nakagawa, Hokkaidō, and was operated by the Hokkaidō Railway Company when it closed.

== Closure ==
It was closed in 1990, and then at some point afterward, the station and all associated buildings were removed from the site.

== Lines ==
- Hokkaido Railway Company

- Sōya Main Line

== Adjacent stations ==
«	Service	»
Sōya Main Line
Limited Express Sōya: Does not stop at this station
Limited Express Sarobetsu: Does not stop at this station
Saku	Local	Teshio-Nakagawa
