= Minami-Bifuka Station =

Railway station in Bifuka, Hokkaido, Japan

Coordinates: 44.4622°N 142.3681°E

Minami-Bifuka Station 南美深駅
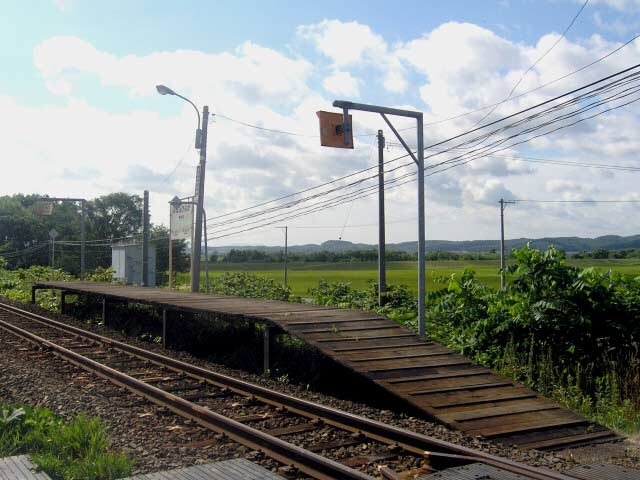

General information
- Location: Bifuka, Hokkaido; Japan
- Operator: JR Hokkaido
- Line: Sōya Main Line

Other information
- Station code: W53

History
- Closed: 13 March 2021
Location

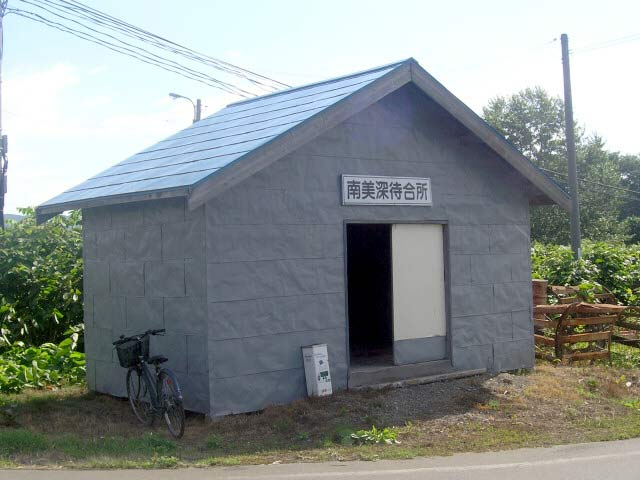
Minami-Bifuka Station's waiting room

Minami-Bifuka Station (南美深駅, Minami-Bifuka-eki) was a railway station located in Bifuka (美深), Bifuka, Nakagawa District (Teshio), Hokkaidō, and was operated by the Hokkaido Railway Company. The station closed on 13 March 2021.

== Lines serviced ==
- Hokkaido Railway Company

- Sōya Main Line

== Adjacent stations ==
«	Service	»
JR Sōya Main Line
Limited Express Sōya: Does not stop at this station
Limited Express Sarobetsu: Does not stop at this station
Chihoku	Local	Bifuka
