= Kamiji Station =

Railway station in Japan

Coordinates: 44°44′30″N 142°08′18″E

Kamiji Station (神路駅, Kamiji-eki) was first a railway station, then a signal station located in Kamiji (神路), Nakagawa, Nakagawa District (Teshio), Hokkaidō, Japan and was operated by the Japanese National Railways.

The station was in official service between 1922 and 1977 and continued as a signal station that allowed passenger use until 1985. In May 2005, the station house and all associated buildings were removed from the site by Hokkaido Railway Company, the operator of the line from 1987.

== Lines serviced ==
- Japanese National Railways
  - Sōya Main Line

== Adjacent stations ==
«	Service	»
Sōya Main Line
Limited Express Sōya: Does not stop at this station
Limited Express Sarobetsu: Does not stop at this station
Osashima	Local	Saku
