= Minami-Pippu Station =

Railway station in Pippu, Hokkaido, Japan

Coordinates: 43.8533°N 142.4676°E

Minami-Pippu Station 南比布駅
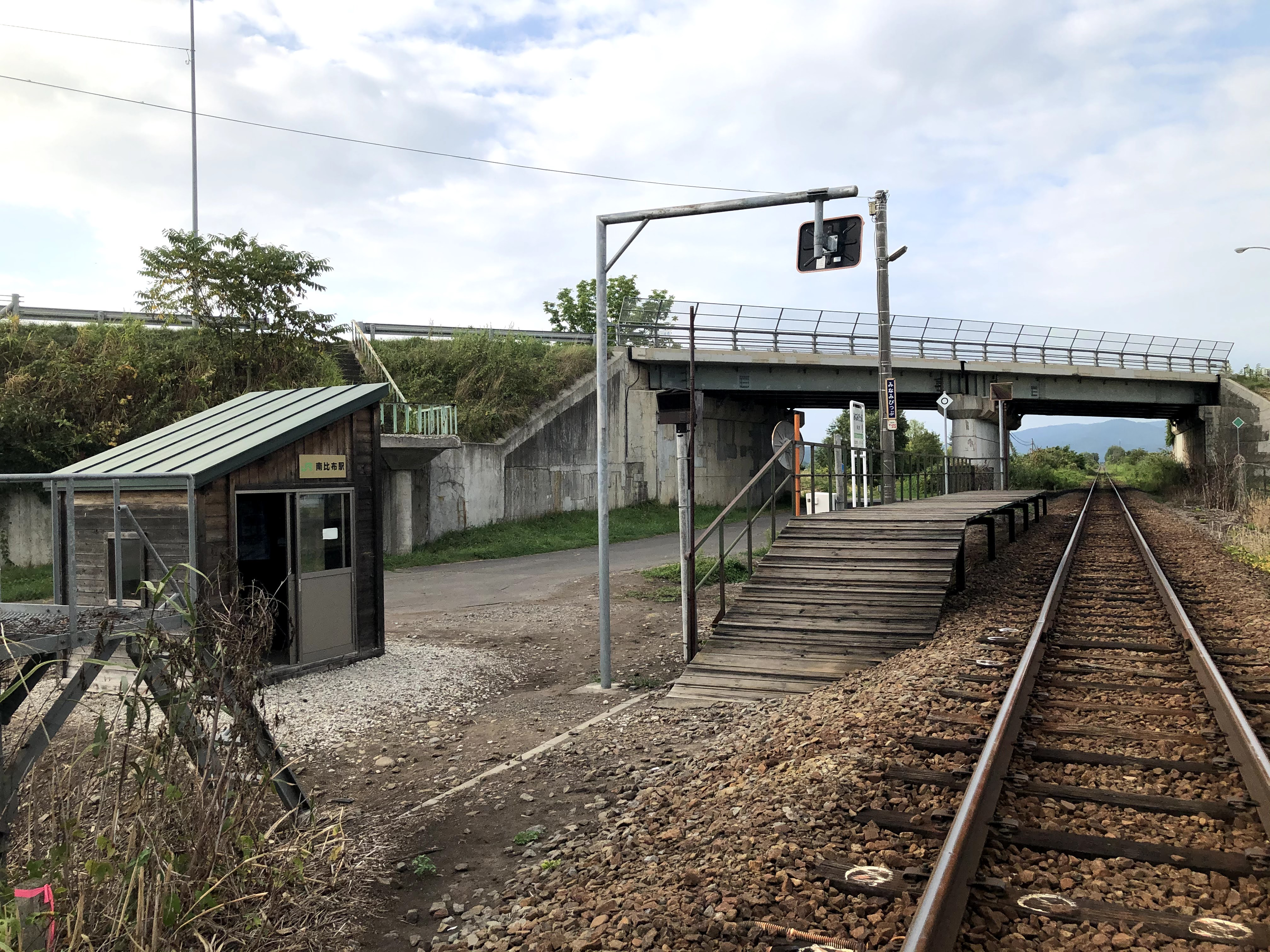
- Minami-Pippu Station in August 2020

General information
- Location: Pippu, Hokkaidō; Japan
- Operator: JR Hokkaido
- Line: Sōya Main Line

Other information
- Station code: W33

History
- Closed: March 13, 2021
Location

Minami-Pippu Station (南比布駅, Minami-Pippu-eki) was a railway station located in Kisen 3-gō, Pippu, Hokkaidō, operated by the Hokkaido Railway Company. The station closed on March 13, 2021.

== Lines Serviced ==
- Hokkaido Railway Company

- Sōya Main Line

== Adjacent stations ==
«	Service	»
JR Sōya Main Line
Rapid Nayoro: Does not stop at this station
Limited Express Sōya: Does not stop at this station
Limited Express Sarobetsu: Does not stop at this station
Kita-Nagayama	Local	Pippu
