= Higashi-Rokusen Station =

Railway station in Kenbuchi, Hokkaido, Japan

Coordinates: 44.0688°N 142.3870°E

Higashi-Rokusen Station 東六線駅
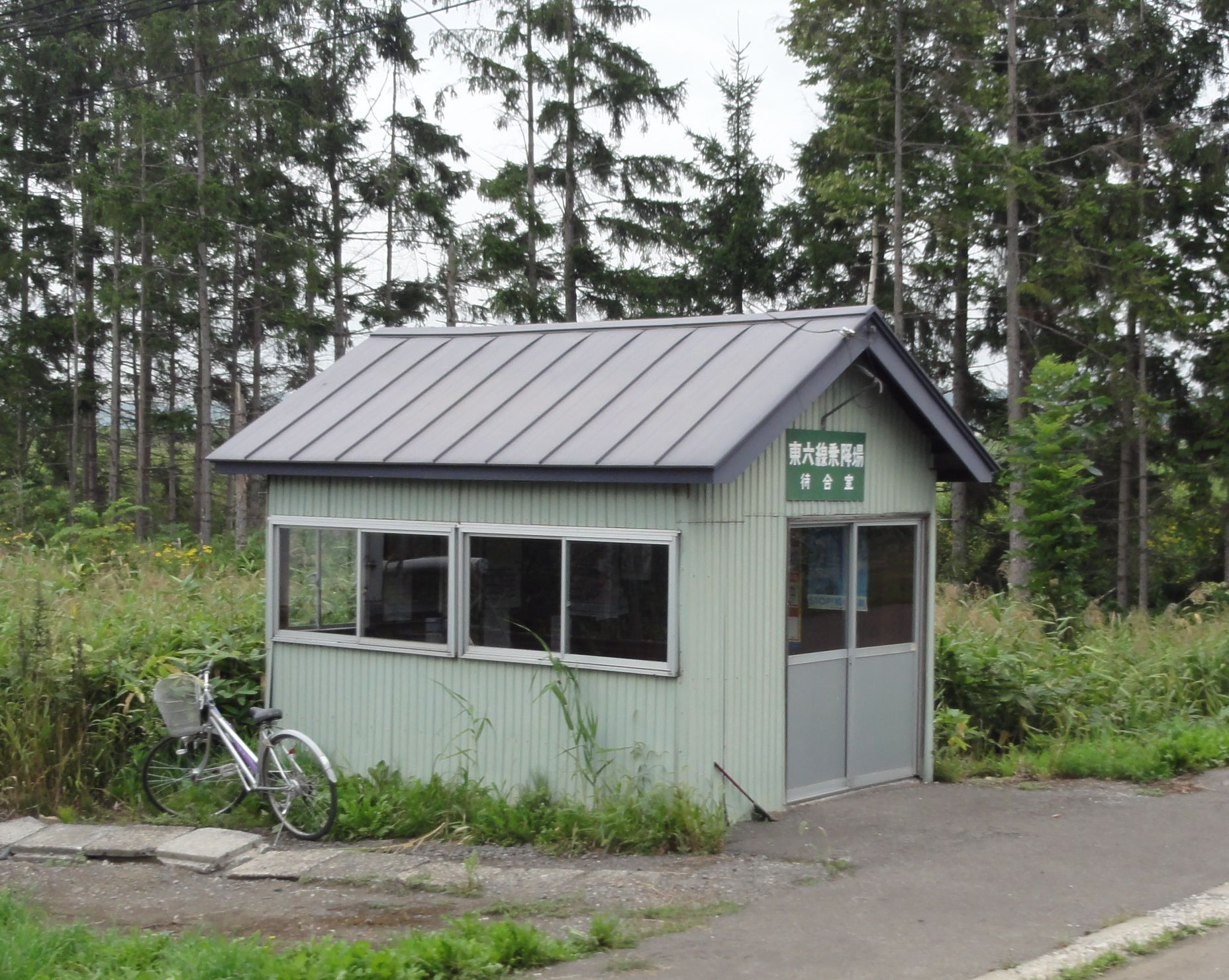

General information
- Location: Kenbuchi, Hokkaido; Japan
- Operator: JR Hokkaido
- Line: Sōya Main Line

Other information
- Station code: W39

History
- Closed: 13 March 2021
Location

Higashi-Rokusen Station (東六線駅, Higashi-rokusen-eki) was a railway station located in Higashimachi (東町), Kenbuchi, Kamikawa District (Ishikari), Hokkaidō. It is operated by the Hokkaido Railway Company. The station was closed on 13 March 2021 due to extremely low usage.

== Lines served ==
- Hokkaido Railway Company

- Sōya Main Line

== Adjacent stations ==
«	Service	»
JR Sōya Main Line
Rapid Nayoro: Does not stop at this station
Limited Express Sōya: Does not stop at this station
Limited Express Sarobetsu: Does not stop at this station
Wassamu	Local	Kembuchi
