= Kita-Nagayama Station =

Railway station in Asahikawa, Hokkaido, Japan

Kita-Nagayama Station 北永山駅
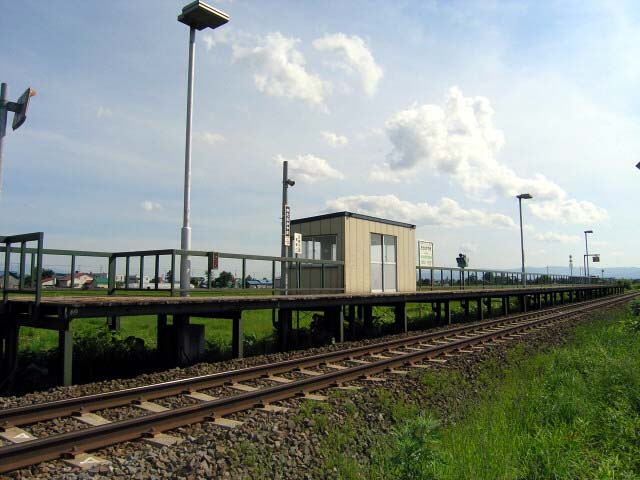

General information
- Location: 14-chōme Nagayama; Asahikawa, Hokkaido; Japan
- Coordinates: 43.8269°N 142.4548°E
- Operator: JR Hokkaido
- Line: Sōya Main Line

Other information
- Station code: W32
Location

Kita-Nagayama Station (北永山駅, Kita-Nagayama-eki) is a railway station located in Nagayama-chō 14-chōme, Asahikawa, Hokkaidō, Japan, and is operated by the Hokkaido Railway Company.

== Lines Serviced ==
- Hokkaido Railway Company

- Sōya Main Line

== Adjacent stations ==
«	Service	»
JR Sōya Main Line
Rapid Nayoro: Does not stop at this station
Limited Express Sōya: Does not stop at this station
Limited Express Sarobetsu: Does not stop at this station
Nagayama	Local	Pippu
