= Kami-Horonobe Station =

Railway station in Horonobe, Hokkaido, Japan

Coordinates: 44.9856°N 141.8810°E

Kami-Horonobe Station 上幌延駅
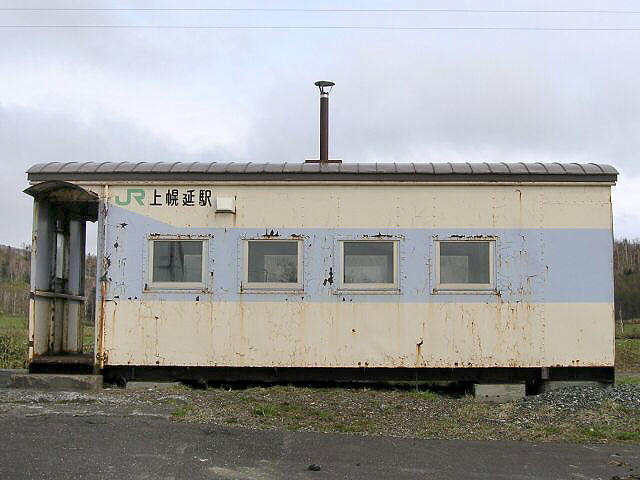

General information
- Location: Horonobe, Hokkaido; Japan
- Operator: Hokkaido Railway Company
- Line: Sōya Main Line

Other information
- Station code: W71
Location

Kami-Horonobe Station (上幌延駅, Kami-Horonobe-eki) was a railway station in Horonobe, Teshio District, Hokkaidō, Japan.

The station closed on 13 March 2021 owing to poor patronage.

== Lines ==
- Hokkaido Railway Company
  - Sōya Main Line Station W71

== Layout ==
Kami-Horonobe Station has a single side platform.

== Adjacent stations ==
| « | Service | » |
Sōya Main Line
Limited Express Sōya: Does not stop at this station
Limited Express Sarobetsu: Does not stop at this station
| Minami-Horonobe | Local | Horonobe |
