= Tokumitsu Station =

Railway station in Toyotomi, Hokkaido, Japan

Coordinates: 45°8′45″N 141°45′3.7″E

Tokumitsu Station 徳満駅
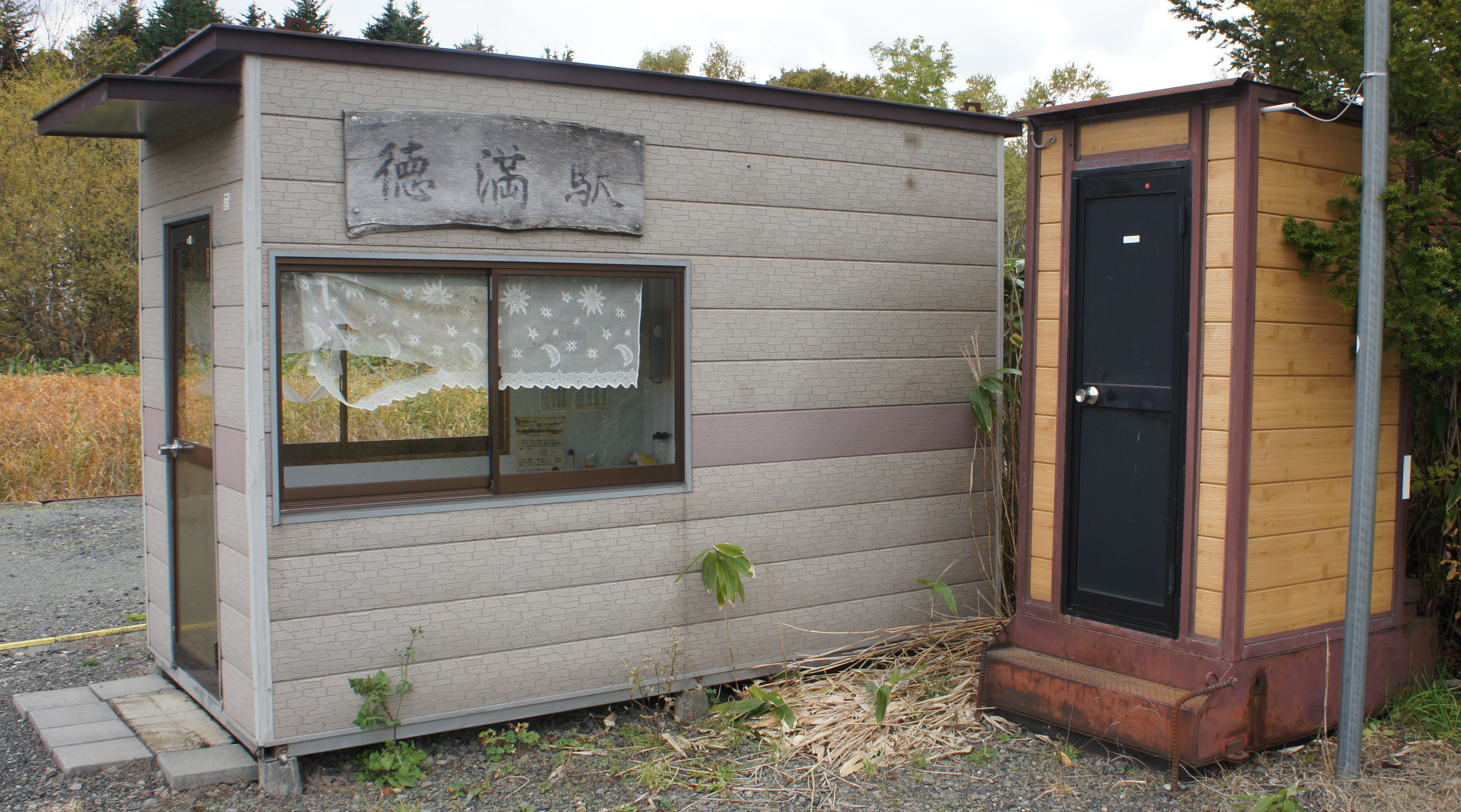
- Tokumitsu Station in October 2017

General information
- Location: Toyotomi, Hokkaido; Japan
- Operator: JR Hokkaido
- Line: ■ Sōya Main Line
- Distance: 230.9 km from Asahikawa
- Platforms: 1 side platform

Other information
- Station code: W75
- Website: Official website

History
- Opened: 25 September 1926
- Closed: 13 March 2021
Location
- Location within Hokkaido Location within Japan

Tokumitsu Station (徳満駅, Tokumitsu-eki) was a railway station in Toyotomi, Teshio District, Hokkaidō, Japan. Only local trains serve this station. The station closed on 13 March 2021.

== Lines ==
- Hokkaido Railway Company
  - Sōya Main Line Station W75

== Layout ==
Tokumitsu Station has a single platform serving one track.

== Gallery ==
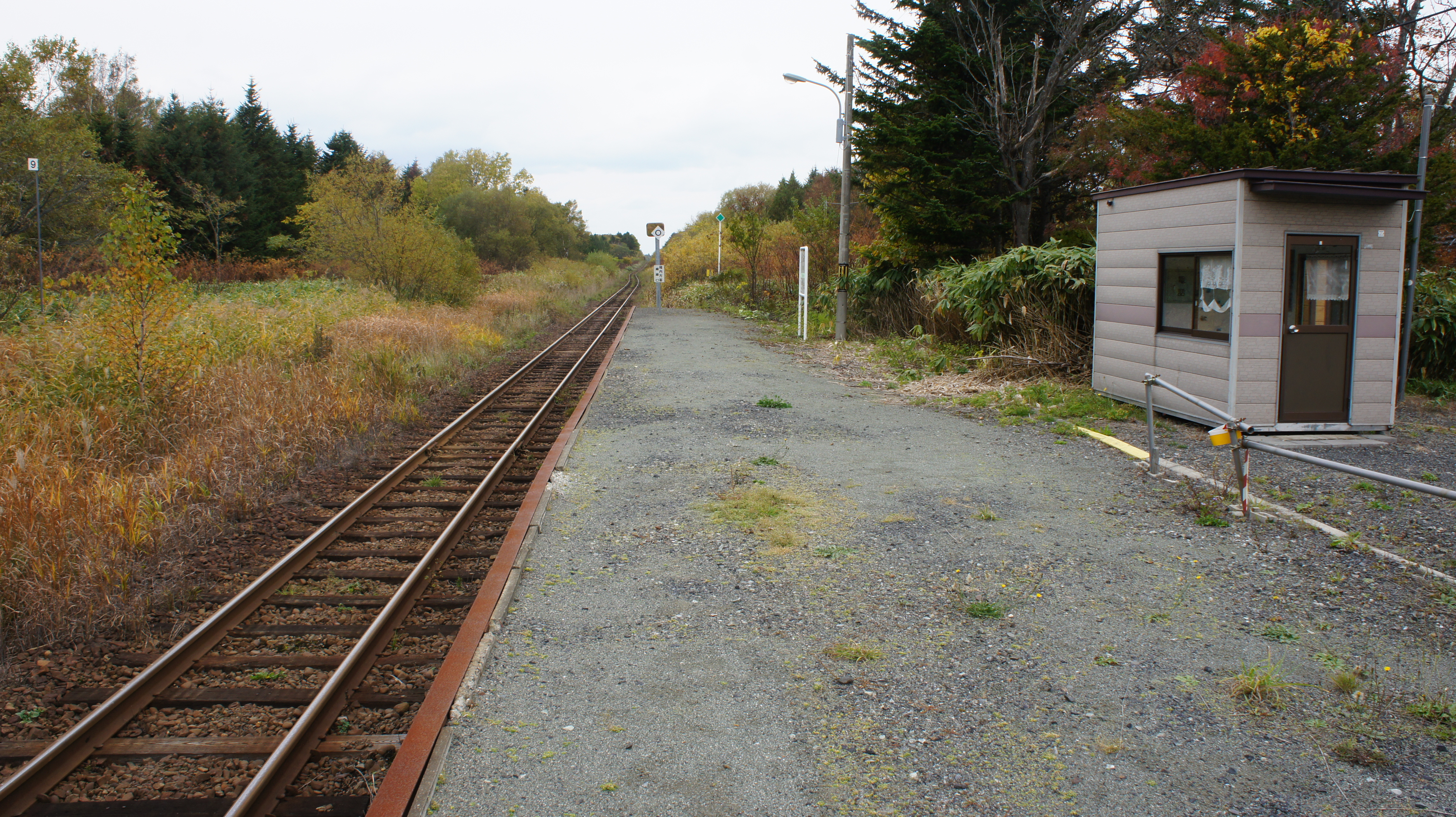
Station platform

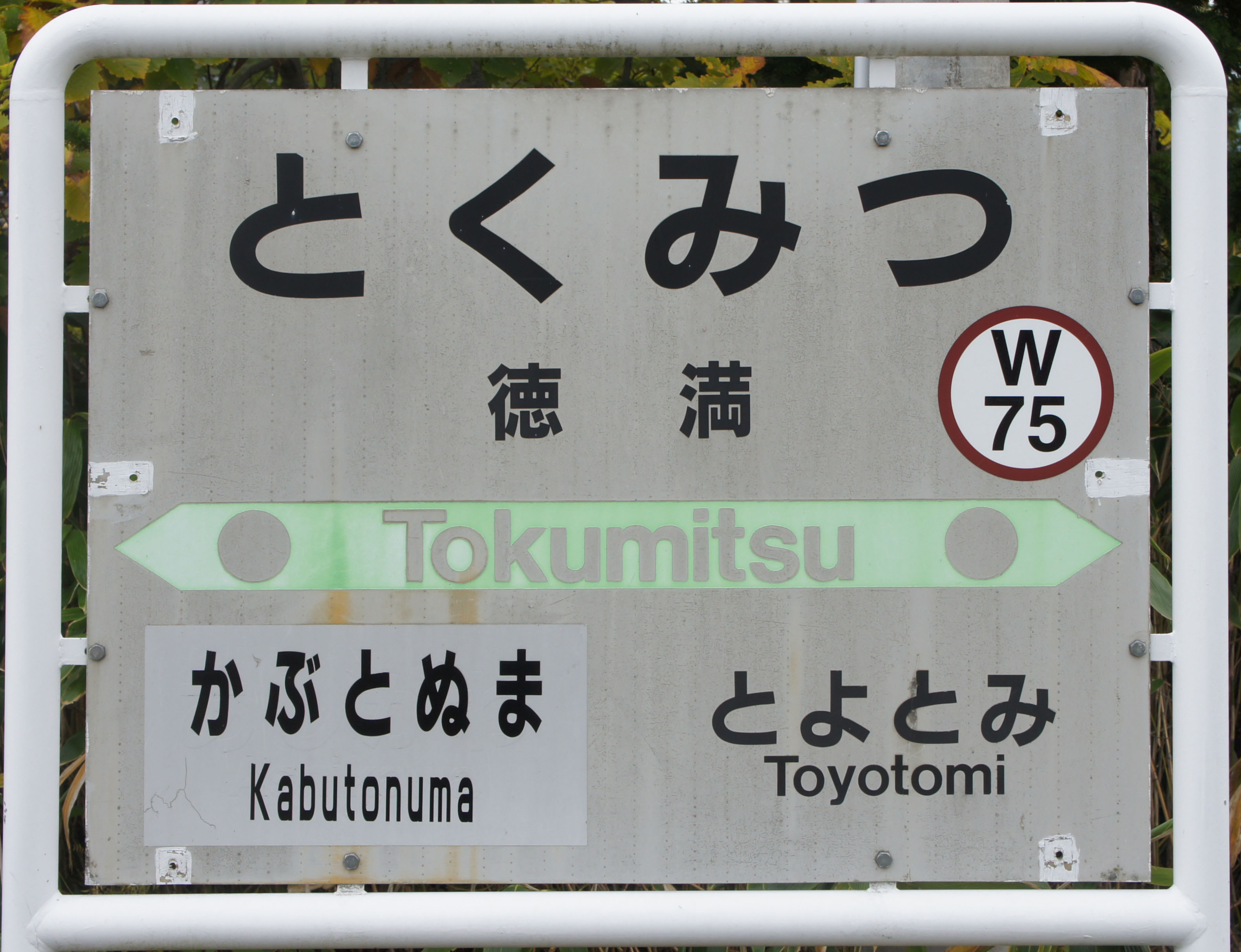
Station sign

== Adjacent stations ==
«	Service	»
Sōya Main Line
Limited Express Sōya: Does not stop at this station
Limited Express Sarobetsu: Does not stop at this station
Toyotomi	Local	Kabutonuma
