= Yasuushi Station =

Railway station in Horonobe, Hokkaido, Japan

Coordinates: 44.9498°N 141.8942°E

Yasuushi Station 安牛駅
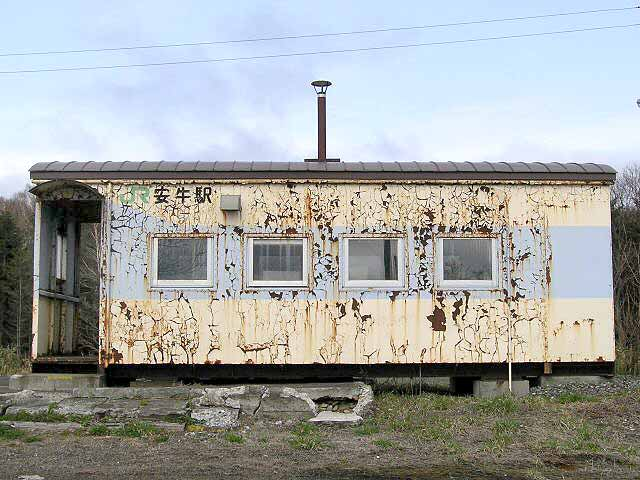

General information
- Location: Horonobe, Hokkaido; Japan
- Operator: Hokkaido Railway Company
- Line: Sōya Main Line

Other information
- Station code: W69

History
- Closed: 13 March 2021
Location

Yasuushi Station (安牛駅, Yasu'ushi-eki) was a railway station in Horonobe, Teshio District, Hokkaidō, Japan. The station closed on 13 March 2021.

== Lines ==
- Hokkaido Railway Company
  - Sōya Main Line Station W69

== Layout ==
Yasuushi Station has a single side platform.

== Adjacent stations ==
«	Service	»
Sōya Main Line
Limited Express Sōya: Does not stop at this station
Limited Express Sarobetsu: Does not stop at this station
Onoppunai	Local	Minami-Horonobe
