= Nisshin Station (Hokkaido) =

Railway station in Nayoro, Hokkaido, Japan

W49 Nisshin Station 日進駅
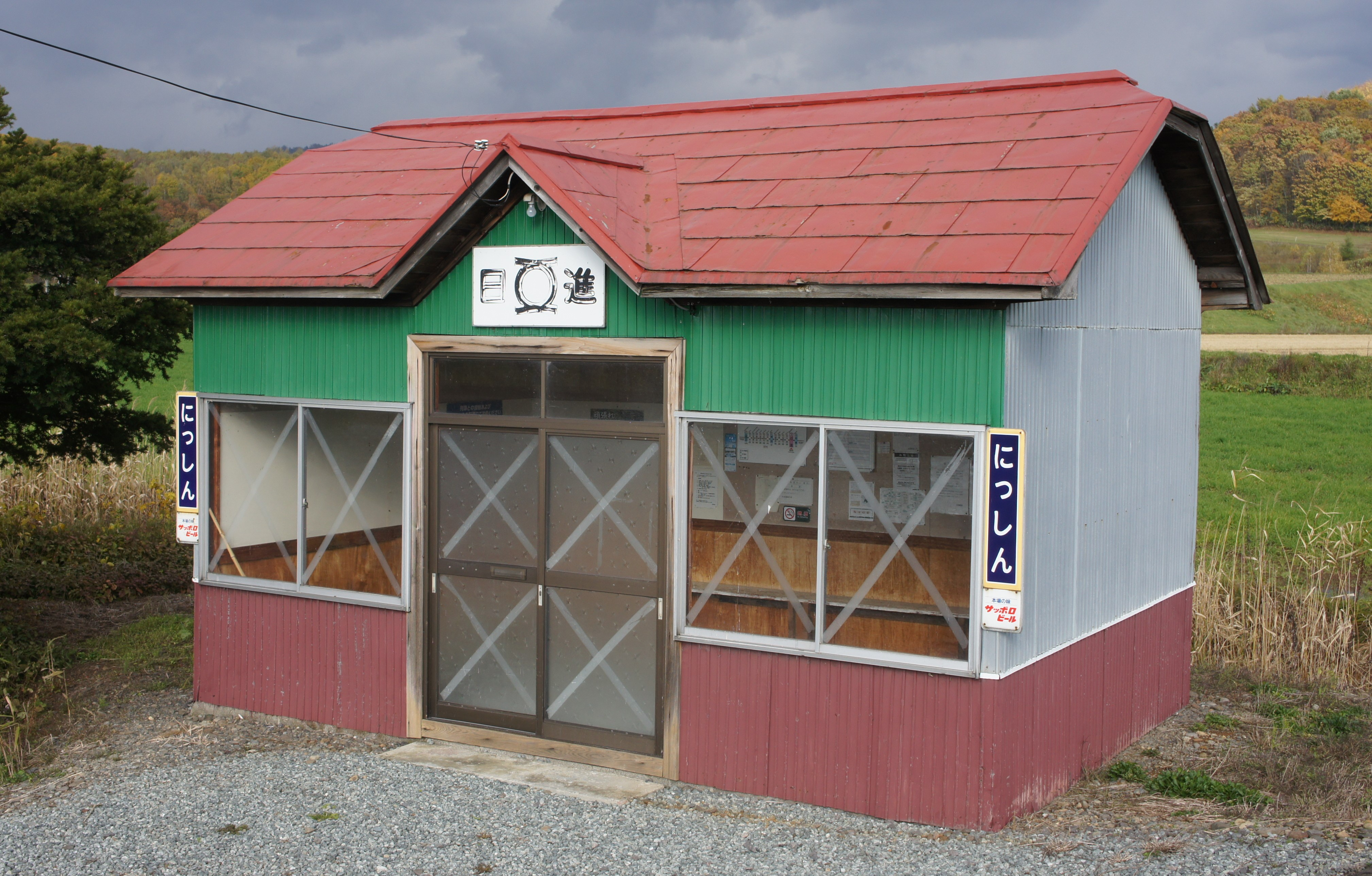
- Nisshin Station

General information
- Location: Nisshin, Nayoro-shi, Hokkaido 096-0066; Japan
- Coordinates: 44°22′54″N 142°28′2.8″E
- System: regional rail
- Operator: JR Hokkaido
- Line: Sōya Main Line
- Distance: 80.2 km (49.8 mi) from Asahikawa
- Platforms: 1 side platform
- Train operators: JR Hokkaido

Construction
- Structure type: At grade

Other information
- Status: Unattended
- Station code: W49
- Website: Official website

History
- Opened: 1 November 1959

Passengers
- FY2022: >1

Services
Preceding station	JR Hokkaido	Following station
Chiebun towards Wakkanai	Sōya Main Line Local	Nayoro towards Asahikawa
Location
- Location within Hokkaido Location within Japan

Nisshin Station (日進駅, Nisshin-eki) is a railway station located in the city of Nayoro, Hokkaidō, Japan. It is operated by JR Hokkaido.

== Lines ==
The station is served by the 259.4 km (161.2 mi) Soya Main Line from Asahikawa to Wakkanai and is located 80.2 km from the starting point of the line at Asahikawa.

== Layout ==
The station above-ground station with one side platform on the right hand side of the single track when facing towards Wakkanai. The station is unattended.

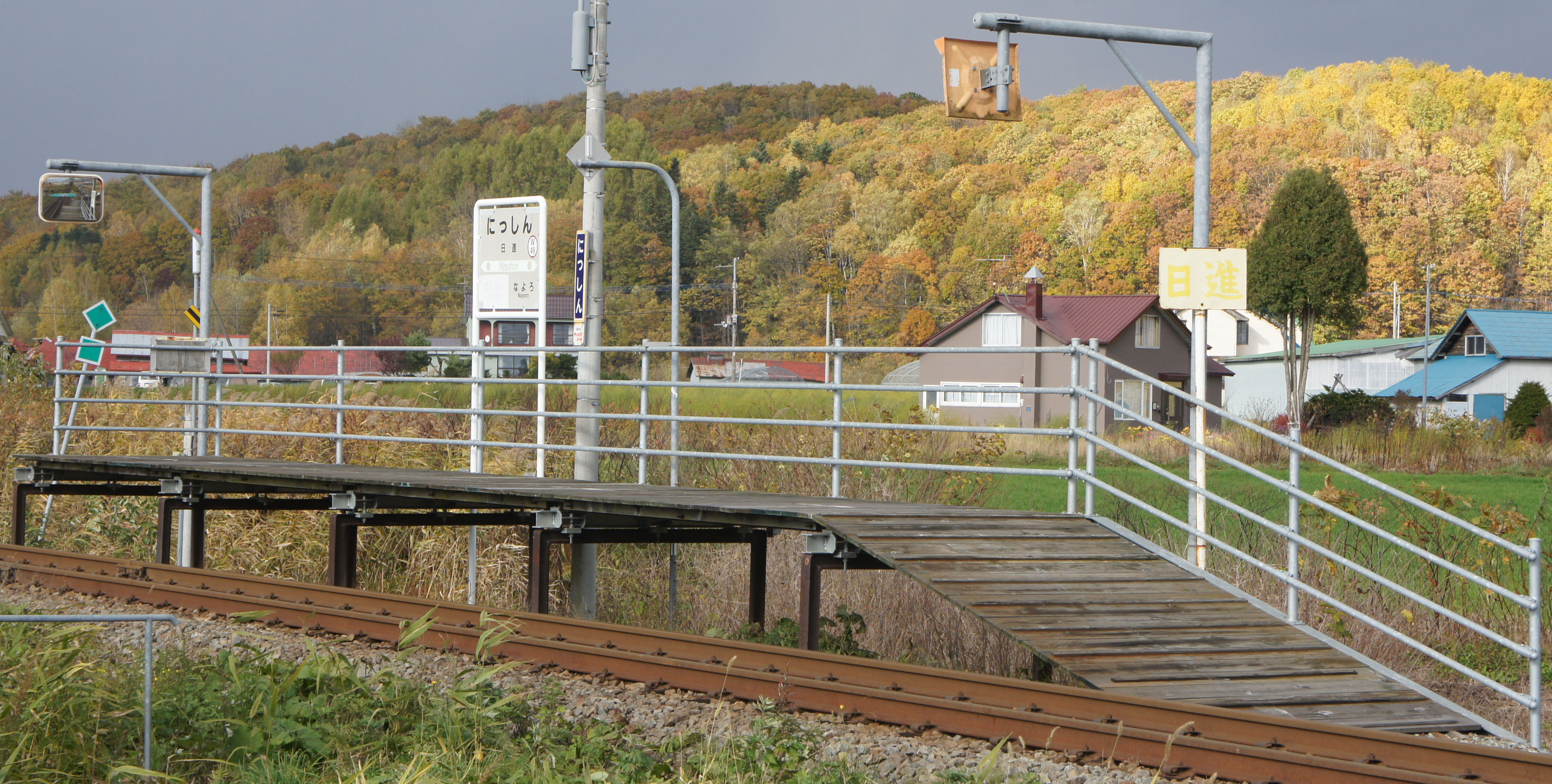
Panorama

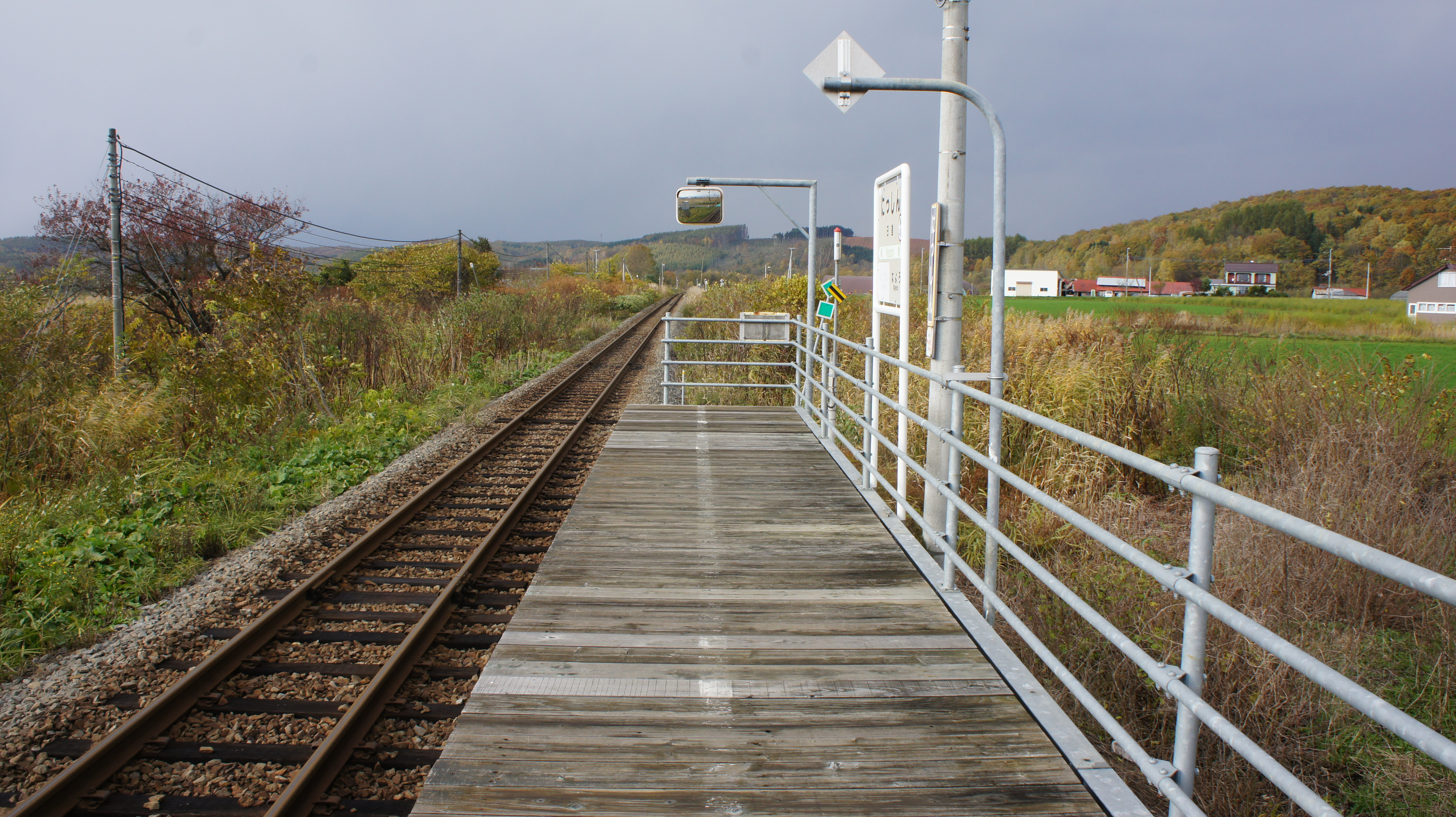
Platform

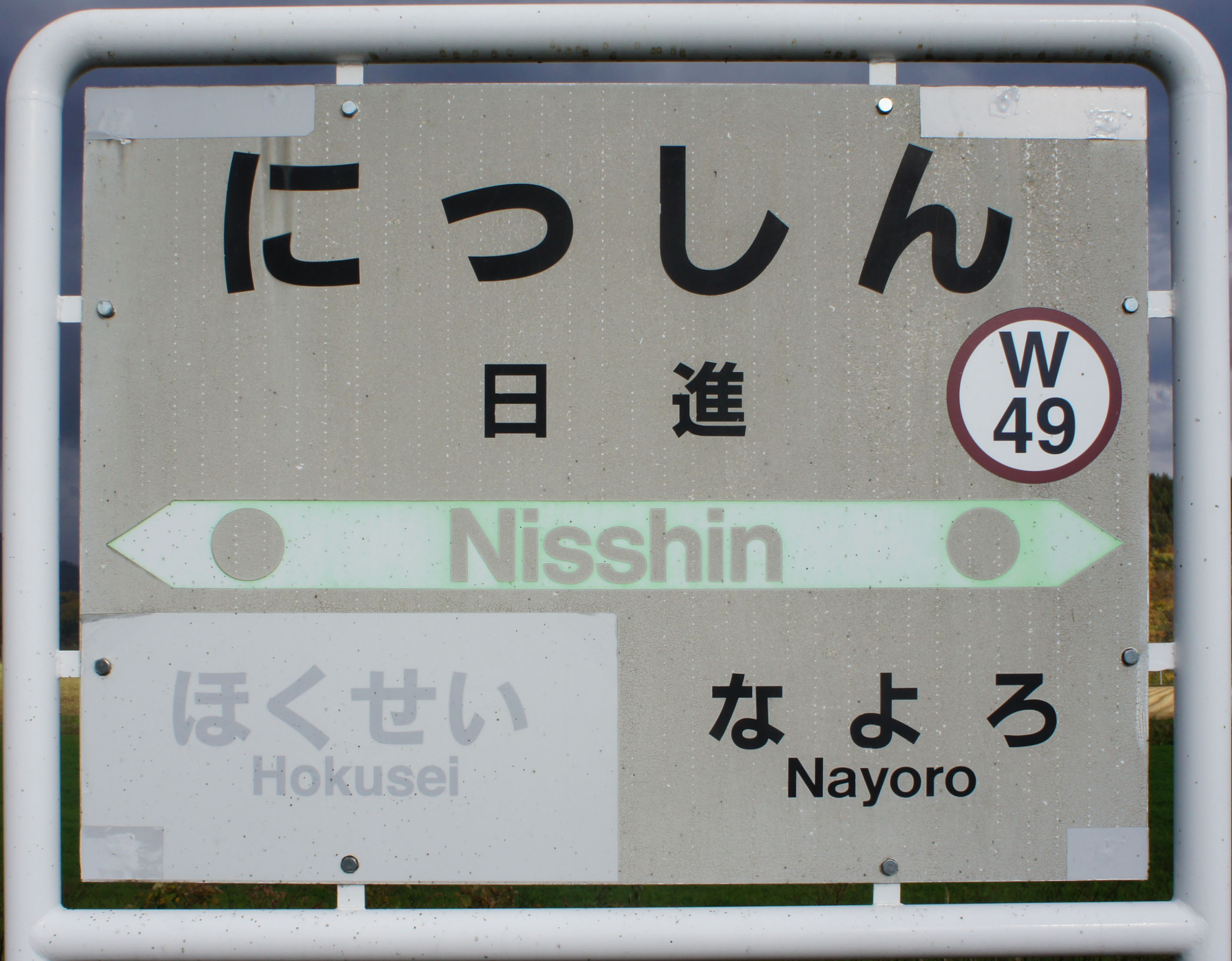
Signage

== History ==
The station was opened on 1 November 1959 as the Nisshin Temporary Station on the Japanese National Railways, at the request of local residents and the city to develop tourism to a ski resort (Nisshin Shichisen Slope, now a mountain forest) located about 300 meters away from the station.With the privatization of Japanese National Railways (JNR) on 1 April 1987, the station came under the control of JR Hokkaido and was upgraded to a full station. On 9 December 2020: JR Hokkaido announced that it would transfer maintenance management to the local government (Nayoro City) from fiscal year 2021. In June 2023, this station was selected to be among 42 stations on the JR Hokkaido network to be slated for abolition.

== Passenger statistics ==
During fiscal 2022, the station was used on average by less than one passengers daily.

== Surrounding area ==
- Hokkaido Highway Route 939

== See also ==
- List of railway stations in Japan
