= Utanai Station =

Railway station in Nakagawa, Hokkaido, Japan

Coordinates: 44.8799°N 142.0523°E

Utanai Station 歌内駅
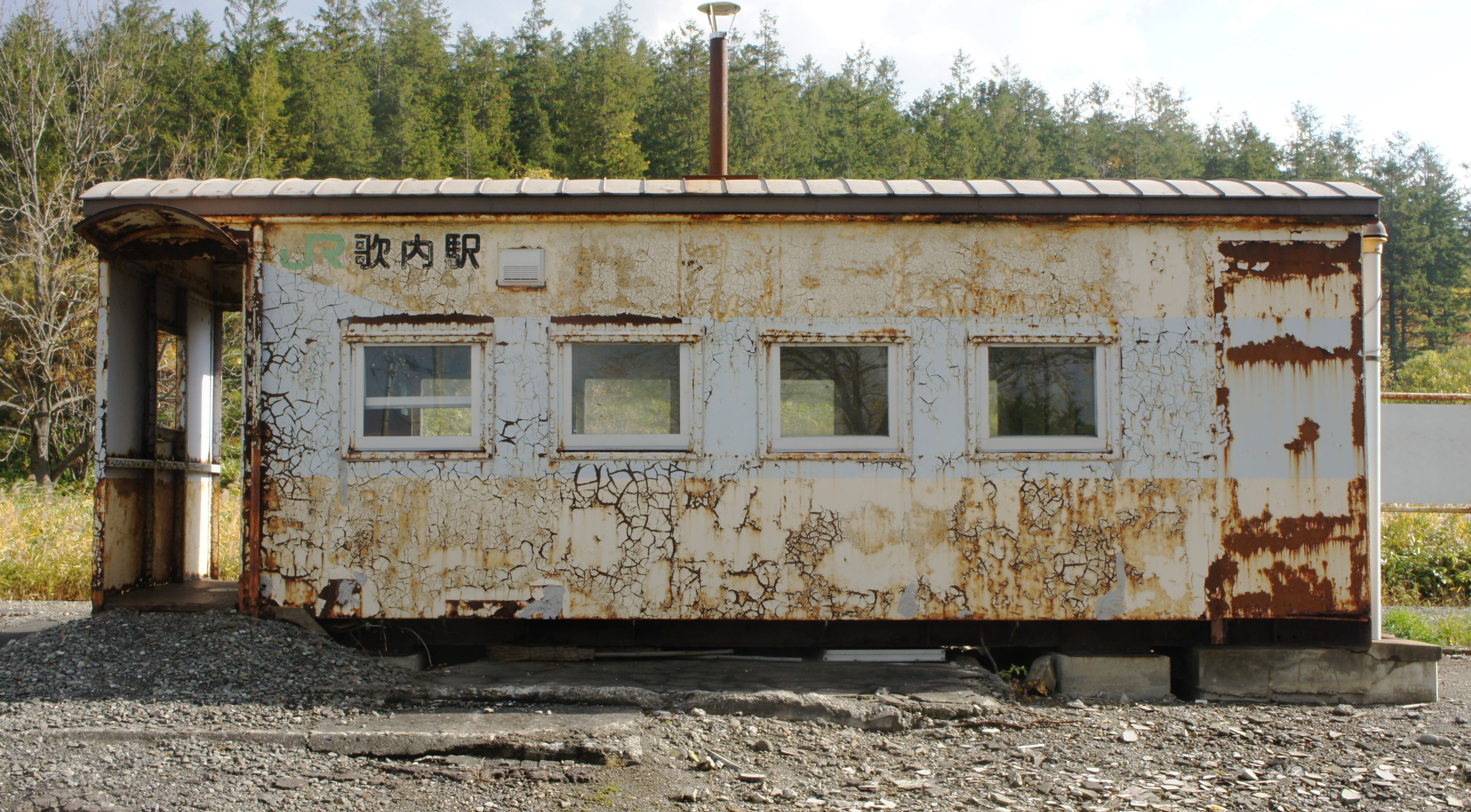
- Utanai Station waiting room in October 2017

General information
- Location: Nakagawa, Hokkaido; Japan
- Operator: Hokkaido Railway Company
- Line: Sōya Main Line

Other information
- Station code: W65

History
- Closed: 13 March 2022
Location

Utanai Station (歌内駅, Utanai-eki) was a railway station in Nakagawa, Nakagawa District, Hokkaidō, Japan. The station closed on 13 March 2022.

== Lines ==
- Hokkaido Railway Company
  - Sōya Main Line Station W65

== Layout ==
Utanai Station has a single side platform.

== Adjacent stations ==
«	Service	»
Sōya Main Line
Limited Express Sōya: Does not stop at this station
Limited Express Sarobetsu: Does not stop at this station
Teshio-Nakagawa	Local	Toikanbetsu
