= Kita-Kembuchi Station =

Railway station in Kenbuchi, Hokkaido, Japan

Coordinates: 44.1392°N 142.3782°E

Kita-Kembuchi Station 北剣淵駅
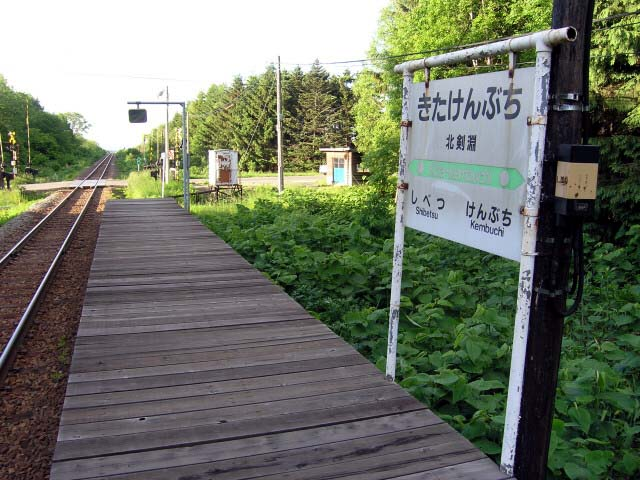

General information
- Location: Kenbuchi, Hokkaido; Japan
- Operator: JR Hokkaido
- Line: Sōya Main Line

Other information
- Station code: W41

History
- Closed: 13 March 2021
Location

Kita-Kenbuchi Station (北剣淵駅, Kita-Kenbuchi-eki) was a railway station located in Fujimotomachi (藤本町), Kenbuchi-chō, Kamikawa-gun, Hokkaidō. It is operated by the Hokkaido Railway Company. The station was closed on 13 March 2021.

== Lines served ==
- JR Hokkaidō

- Sōya Main Line

== Adjacent stations ==
«	Service	»
JR Sōya Main Line
Rapid Nayoro: Does not stop at this station
Limited Express Sōya: Does not stop at this station
Limited Express Sarobetsu: Does not stop at this station
Kembuchi	Local (普通)	Shibetsu
