= Kita-Pippu Station =

Railway station in Pippu, Hokkaido, Japan

Coordinates: 43.9018°N 142.4766°E

Kita-Pippu Station 北比布駅
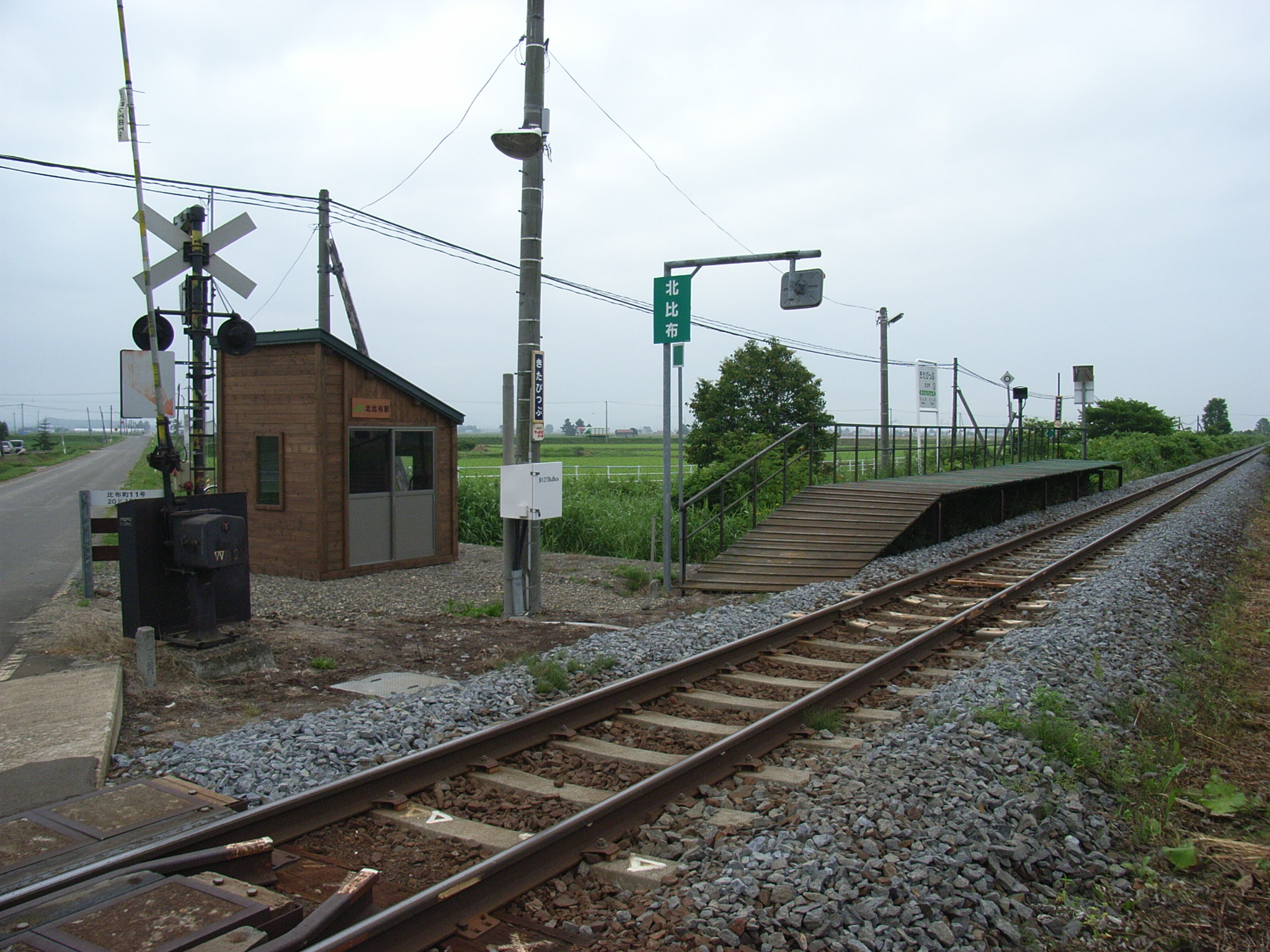
- Kita-Pippu Station in July, 2015

General information
- Location: Pippu, Hokkaidō; Japan
- Operator: JR Hokkaido
- Line: Sōya Main Line

Other information
- Station code: W35

History
- Closed: March 13, 2021
Location

Kita-Pippu Station (北比布駅, Kita-Pippu-eki) was a train station located in Kita-5-sen 11-gō, Pippu, Hokkaidō, and is operated by the Hokkaido Railway Company. This station permanently closed on March 13, 2021.

== Lines Serviced ==
- Hokkaido Railway Company

- Sōya Main Line

== Adjacent stations ==
«	Service	»
JR Sōya Main Line
Rapid Nayoro: Does not stop at this station
Limited Express Sōya: Does not stop at this station
Limited Express Sarobetsu: Does not stop at this station
Pippu	Local	Ranru
