= Hatsuno Station =

Railway station in Bifuka, Hokkaido, Japan

Coordinates: 44.5127°N 142.3362°E

Hatsuno Station 初野駅
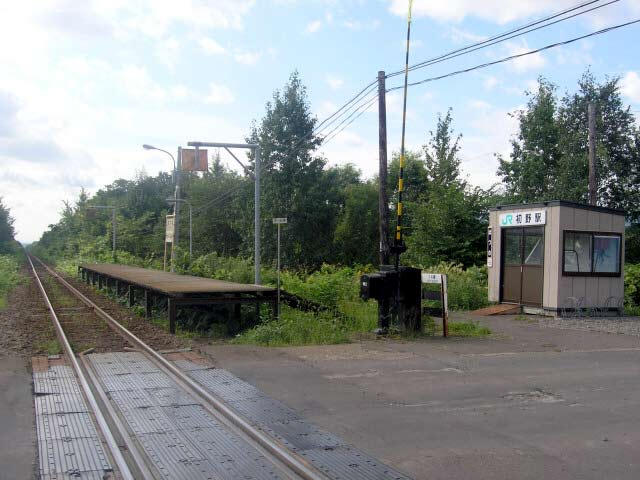

General information
- Location: Bifuka, Hokkaido; Japan
- Operator: JR Hokkaido
- Line: Sōya Main Line

Other information
- Station code: W55

History
- Closed: 16 March 2024
Location

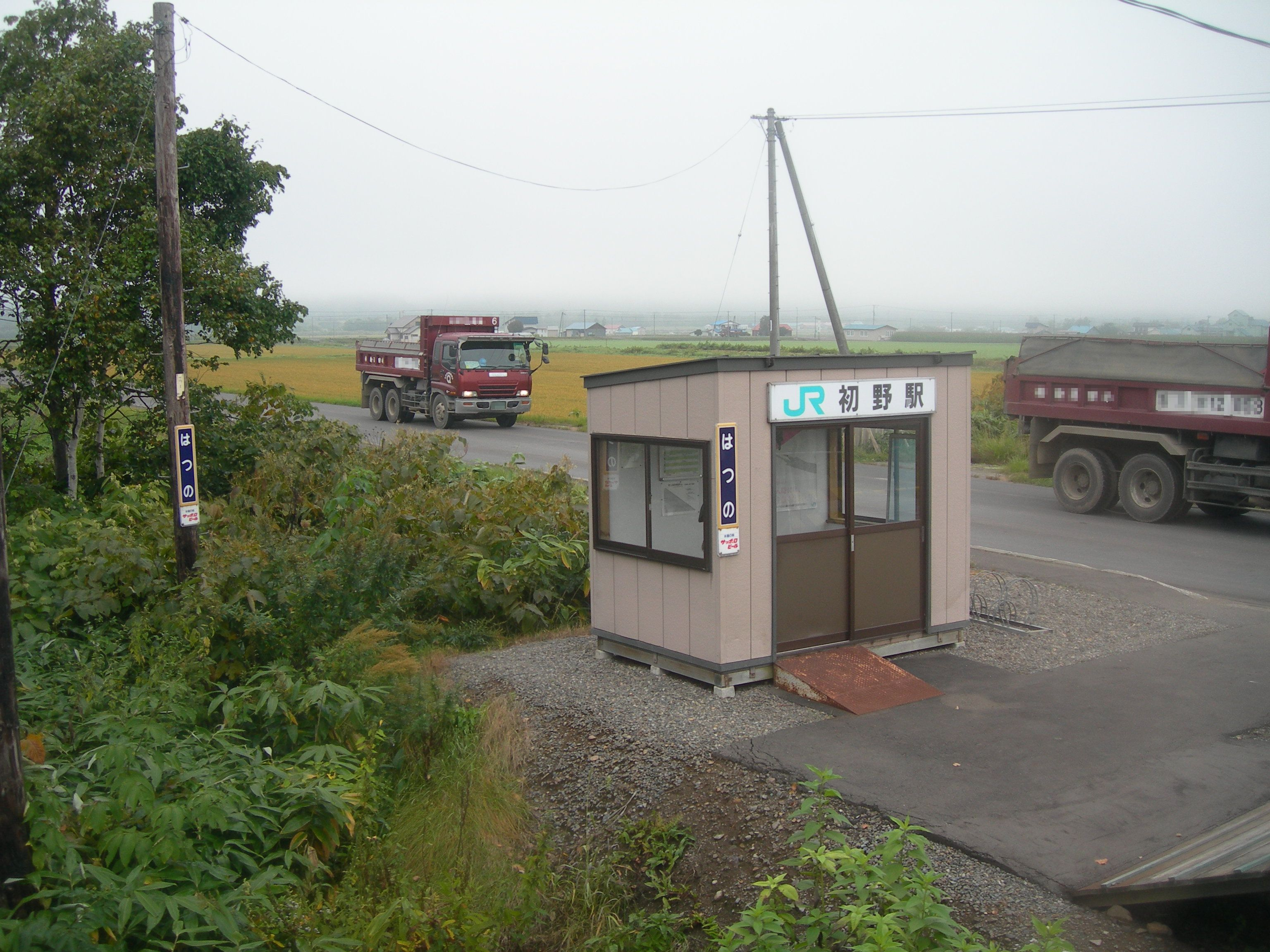
Station building

Hatsuno Station (初野駅, Hatsuno-eki) was a railway station located in Tomioka (富岡), Bifuka, Nakagawa District (Teshio), Hokkaidō, and was operated by the Hokkaido Railway Company.

== Lines serviced ==
- Hokkaido Railway Company
  - Sōya Main Line

== History ==
In June 2023, this station was selected to be among 42 stations on the JR Hokkaido network to be slated for abolition owing to low ridership. The last train served the station on 15 March 2024 and the station was officially closed the next day.

== Adjacent stations ==
«	Service	»
JR Sōya Main Line
Limited Express Sōya: Does not stop at this station
Limited Express Sarobetsu: Does not stop at this station
Bifuka	Local	Onnenai
