= Chiebun Station =

Railway station in Nayoro, Hokkaido, Japan

W51 Chiebun Station 智恵文駅
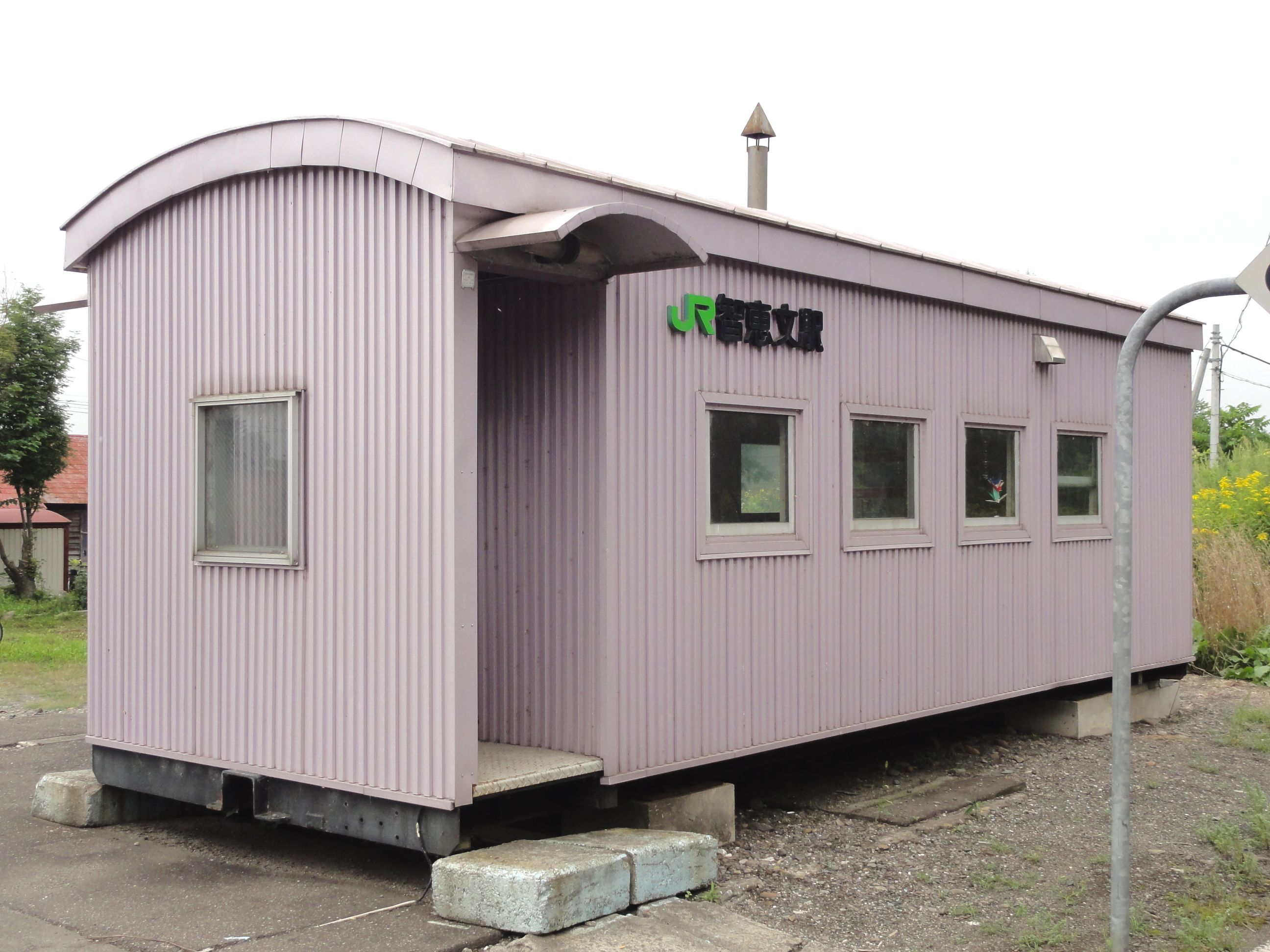
- Chiebun Station

General information
- Location: Chiebun, Nayoro-shi, Hokkaido 098-2181; Japan
- Coordinates: 44°27′19″N 142°24′53″E
- System: regional rail
- Operator: JR Hokkaido
- Line: Sōya Main Line
- Distance: 91.2 km (56.7 mi) from Asahikawa
- Platforms: 1 side platform
- Train operators: JR Hokkaido

Construction
- Structure type: At grade

Other information
- Status: Unattended
- Station code: W51
- Website: Official website

History
- Opened: 3 November 1911

Passengers
- FY2022: 3

Services
Preceding station	JR Hokkaido	Following station
Chihoku towards Wakkanai	Sōya Main Line Local	Nisshin towards Asahikawa
Location
- Location within Hokkaido Location within Japan

Chiebun Station (智恵文駅, Chiebun-eki) is a railway station located in the city of Nayoro, Hokkaidō, Japan. It is operated by JR Hokkaido.

== Lines ==
The station is served by the 259.4 km (161.2 mi) Soya Main Line from Asahikawa to Wakkanai and is located 91.2 km from the starting point of the line at Asahikawa.

== Layout ==
The station above-ground station with one side platform on the west side of the single track when facing towards Wakkanai. The station building is located on the west side of the premises and is a modified Yo3500 series caboose. The station is unattended.

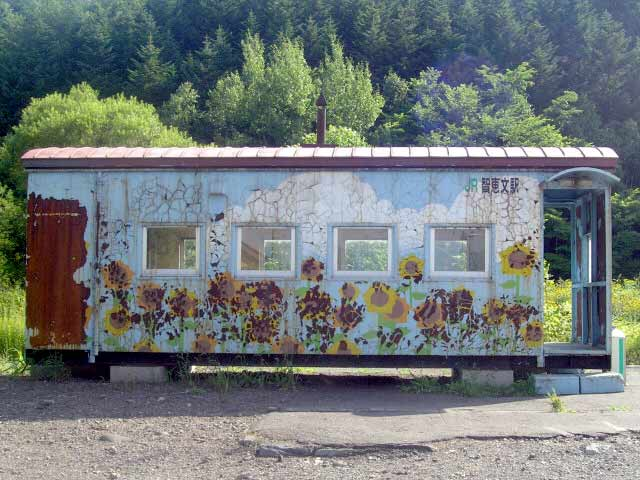
Station exterior in 2004

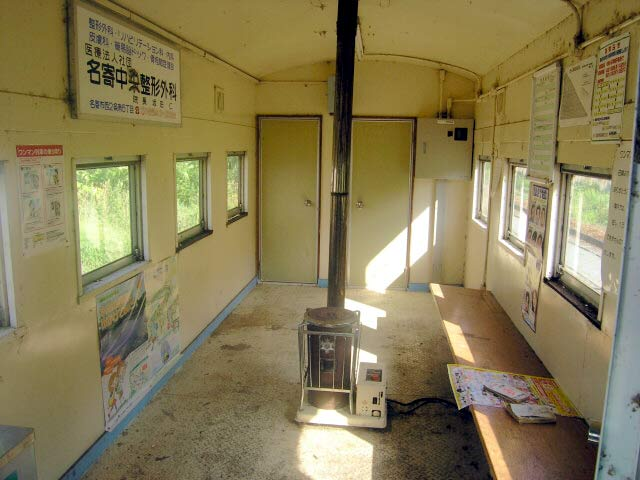
Station building interior

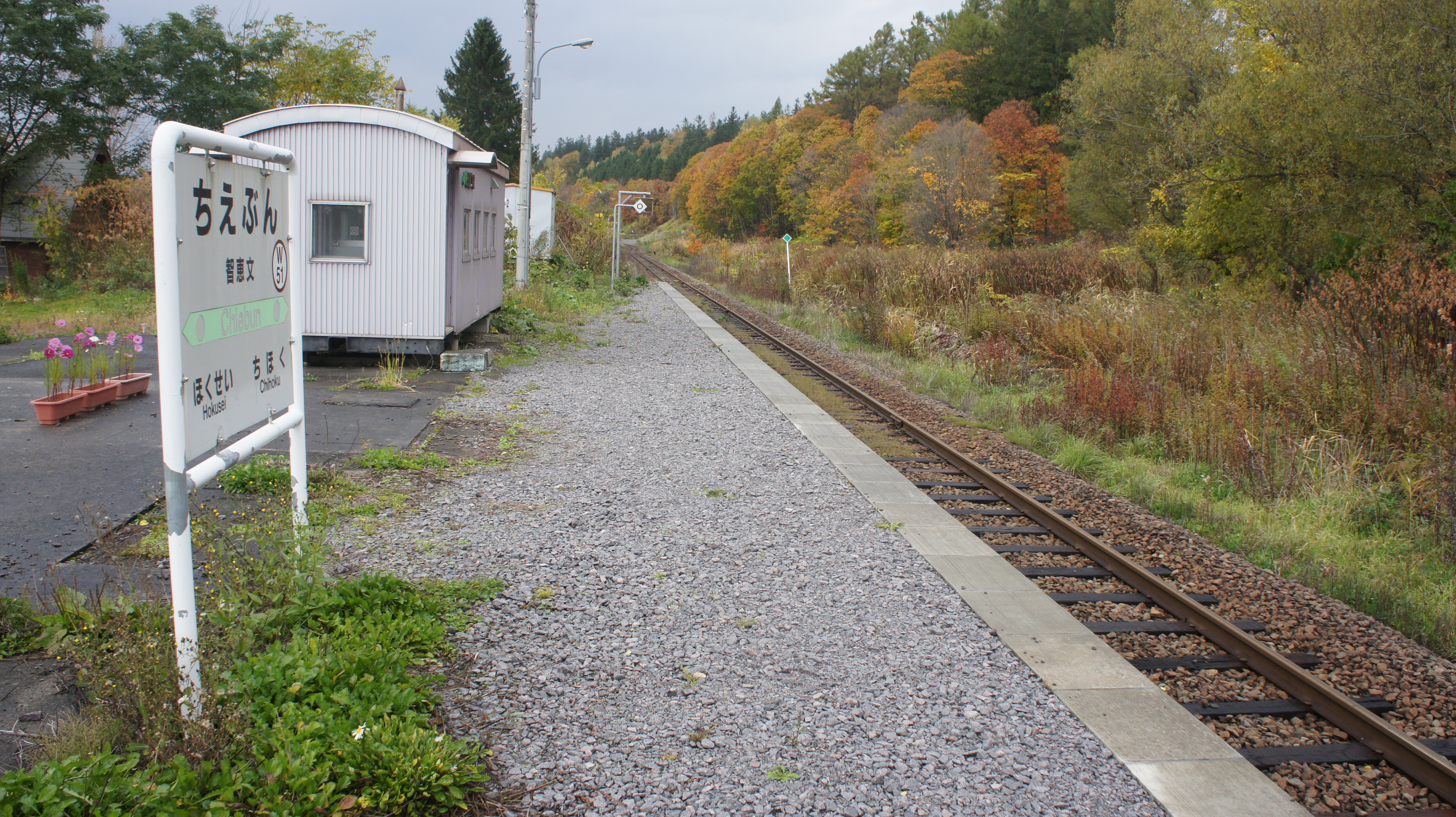
Platform

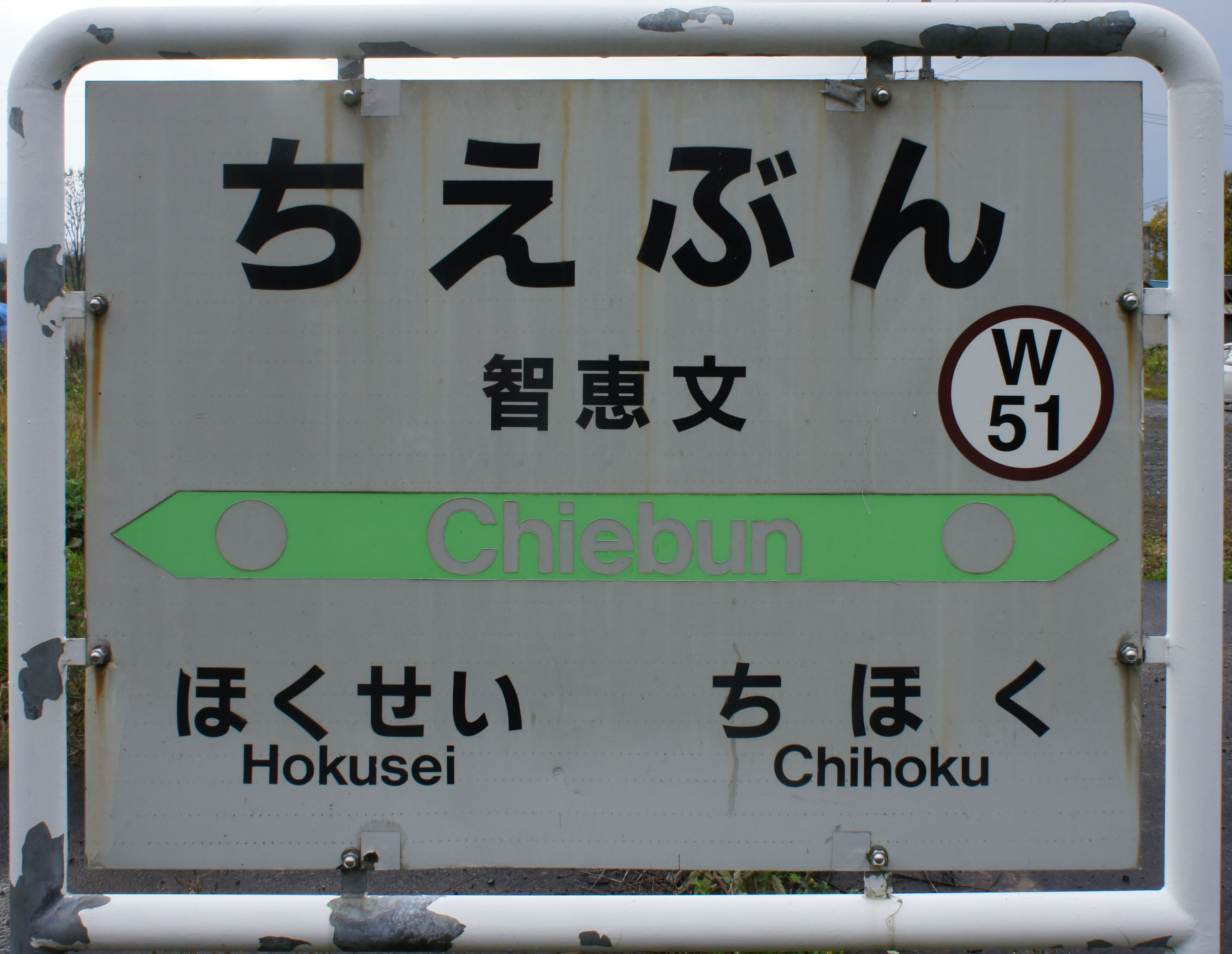
Signage

== History ==
The station was opened on 3 November 1911.With the privatization of Japanese National Railways (JNR) on 1 April 1987, the station came under the control of JR Hokkaido.

== Passenger statistics ==
During fiscal 2022, the station was used on average by 3 passengers daily.

== Surrounding area ==
- Chiebun Marsh
- Hokkaido Highway 252

== See also ==
- List of railway stations in Japan
