= Onnenai Station =

Railway station in Bifuka, Hokkaido, Japan

Coordinates: 44.5986°N 142.3094°E

Onnenai Station 恩根内駅
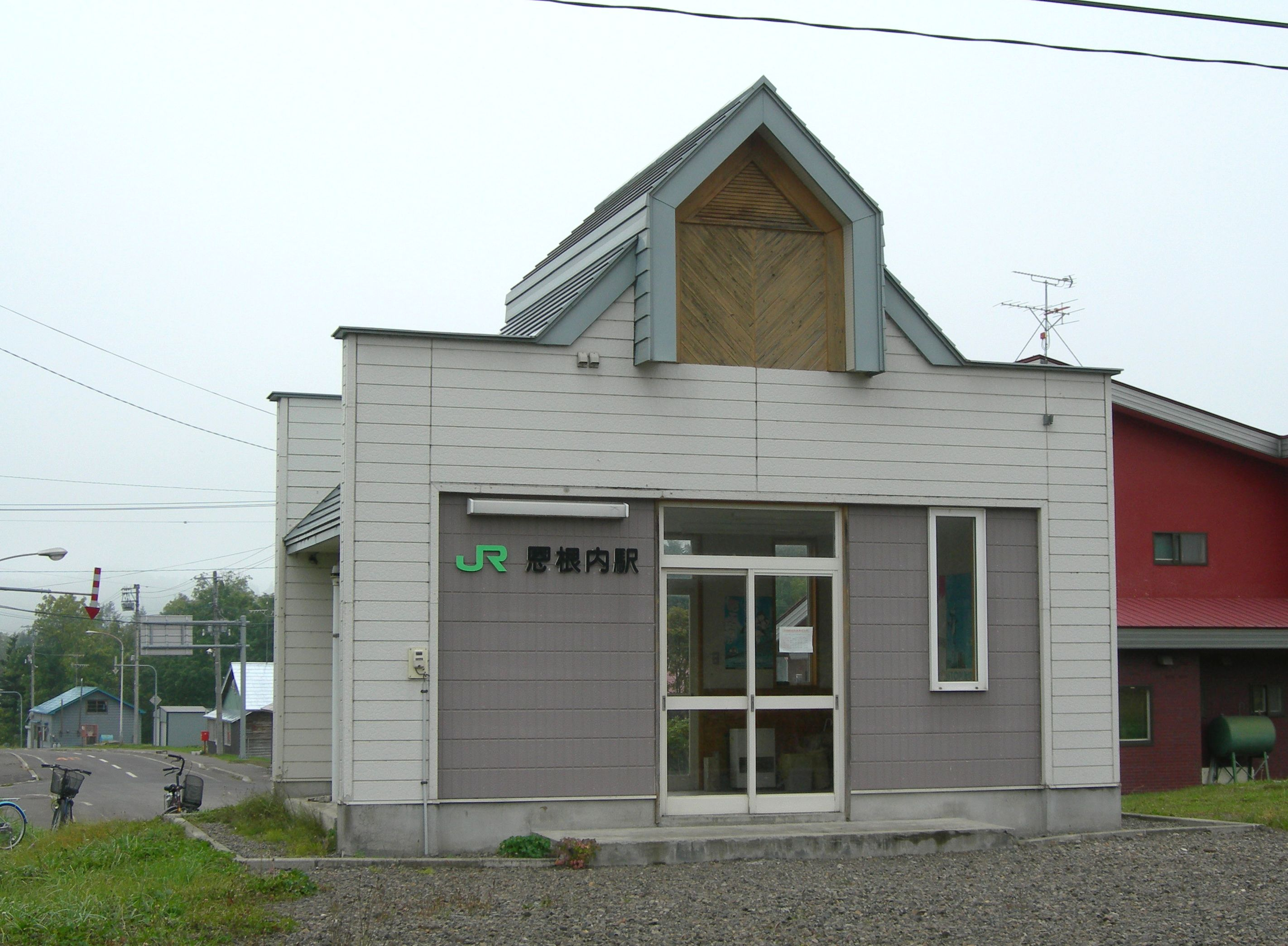
- Onnenai Station building, September 2009

General information
- Location: Bifuka, Nakagawa (Teshio), Hokkaido; Japan
- Operator: Hokkaido Railway Company
- Line: Sōya Main Line

Other information
- Station code: W57

History
- Closed: 16 March 2024
Location

Onnenai Station (恩根内駅, Onnenai-eki) was a railway station located in Onnenai (恩根内), Bifuka, Nakagawa District (Teshio), Hokkaidō prefecture, and was operated by the Hokkaido Railway Company.

== Lines serviced ==
- Hokkaido Railway Company

- Sōya Main Line

== History ==
In June 2023, this station was selected to be among 42 stations on the JR Hokkaido network to be slated for abolition owing to low ridership. The last train served the station on 15 March 2024, and the station was officially closed the next day.

== Adjacent stations ==
| « | Service | » |
JR Sōya Main Line
Limited Express Sōya: Does not stop at this station
Limited Express Sarobetsu: Does not stop at this station
| Hatsuno | Local | Teshiogawa-Onsen |
