= W68 (disambiguation) =

The W68 was an American thermonuclear warhead.

W68 may also refer to:

- Octahemioctahedron
- Onoppunai Station, in Hokkaido, Japan
