= W66 =

W66 may refer to:

- W66 (nuclear warhead)
- Toikanbetsu Station, in Hokkaido, Japan
- Warrenton–Fauquier Airport, in Fauquier County, Virginia, United States
