= W70 (disambiguation) =

The W70 was an American thermonuclear warhead.

W70 may also refer to:

- Minami-Horonobe Station, in Hokkaido, Japan
- Small ditrigonal icosidodecahedron
- W70, a classification in masters athletics
