= Otonrui Wind Farm =

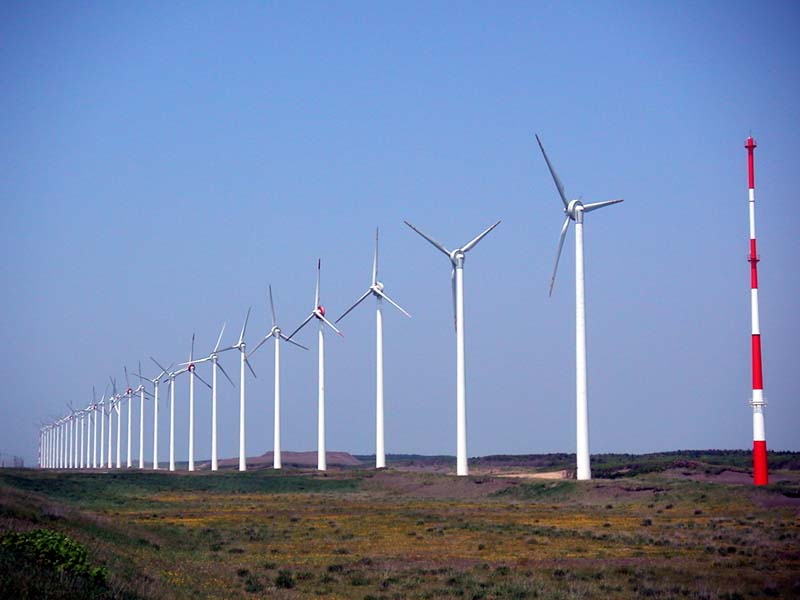

- Location within Japan Location within Hokkaido
- Country: Japan
- Location: Horonobe, Hokkaidō, Japan
- Coordinates: 44°58′36″N 141°41′55″E
- Status: Operational
- Construction began: 2001
- Commission date: 2003
- Operators: Horonobe Wind Power Co., Ltd.

Wind farm
- Type: Onshore
- Hub height: 74m
- Rotor diameter: 50.5m

Power generation
- Units operational: 28
- Make and model: Lagerwey LW50/750
- Nameplate capacity: 21,000 KW
- Annual net output: 58,000,000 KWh

External links
- Website: https://www.horonobe-wp.com/
- Commons: Related media on Commons

The Otonrui Wind Farm (オトンルイ風力発電所, Otonrui fūryoku hatsudensho) is an onshore wind farm near the town of Horonobe on the Japanese island of Hokkaidō.

The name "Otonrui" is a loose Japanese transliteration of the original Ainu ota-or-un-i (Ainu: オタ・オㇽ・ウン・イ, transl. 'path by the sand').

== Summary ==
The site was designed and installed by JFE Engineering Corporation using innovative direct-drive wind turbines made by the Dutch company Lagerwey BV. Construction began in 2001 and the site became fully operational in 2003, with the energy output distributed by a HEPCO substation in Horonobe. The 28 turbines are arranged in a straight line more than 2 km (1.2 mi) long and utilize the sea breeze which blows across the Sarobetsu Plain.

It was announced that the aging Lagerwey turbines would be decommissioned and demolished in 2023, but the date has since been pushed back to 2027.
