= Osashima Station =

Railway station in Otoineppu, Hokkaido, Japan

W62 Osashima Station 筬島駅
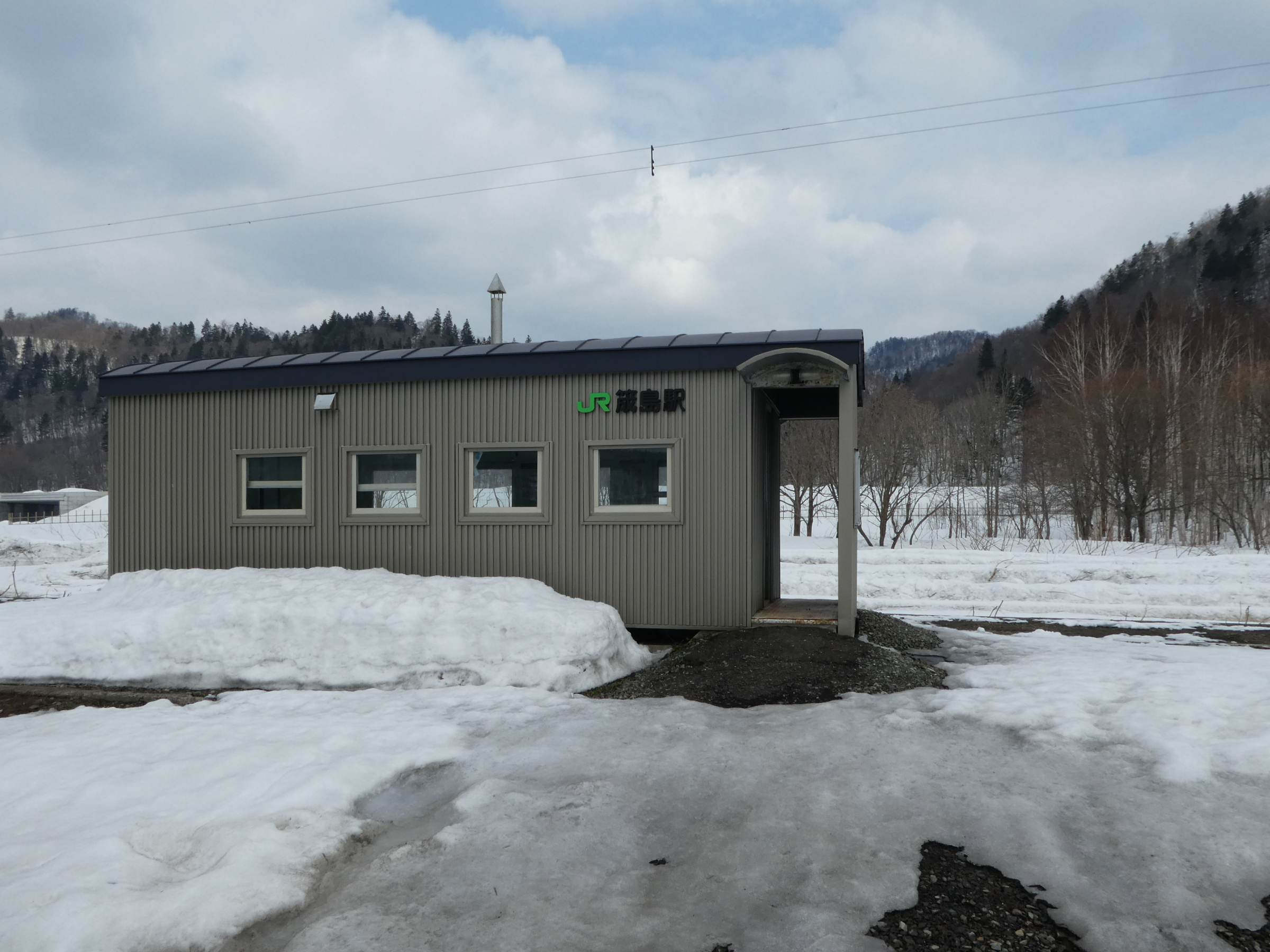
- The station structure in April 2017

General information
- Location: Monomanai, Otoineppu-mura, Nakagawa-gun, Hokkaido 098-2500; Japan
- Coordinates: 44°44′19.4″N 142°11′51.5″E
- System: regional rail
- Operator: JR Hokkaido
- Line: Sōya Main Line
- Distance: 135.6 km (84.3 mi) from Asahikawa
- Platforms: 1 side platform
- Train operators: JR Hokkaido

Construction
- Structure type: At grade

Other information
- Status: Unattended
- Station code: W62
- Website: Official website

History
- Opened: 8 November 1922

Passengers
- FY2022: <1

Services
| Preceding station | JR Hokkaido | Following station |
|---|---|---|
| Saku towards Wakkanai | Sōya Main Line Local | Otoineppu towards Asahikawa |
Location
- Location within Hokkaido Location within Japan

Osashima Station (筬島駅, Osashima-eki) is a railway station located in the village of Otoineppu, Nakagawa District (Teshio), Hokkaidō, Japan. It is operated by JR Hokkaido.

== Lines ==
The station is served by the 259.4 km (161.2 mi) Soya Main Line from Asahikawa to Wakkanai and is located 135.6 km from the starting point of the line at Asahikawa.

== Layout ==
Osashima Station is an above-ground station with one side platform and one track. It is a single-track station without switches. It formerly had two side platforms and two tracks. Currently, the station uses the platform on the southwest side of the track where the station building is located (the left hand side when facing Wakkanai, the old outbound track). It is an unstaffed station managed by Otoineppu Village. After the station building was unstaffed, a modified Yo3500 series caboose was installed on the foundations of the old station building.

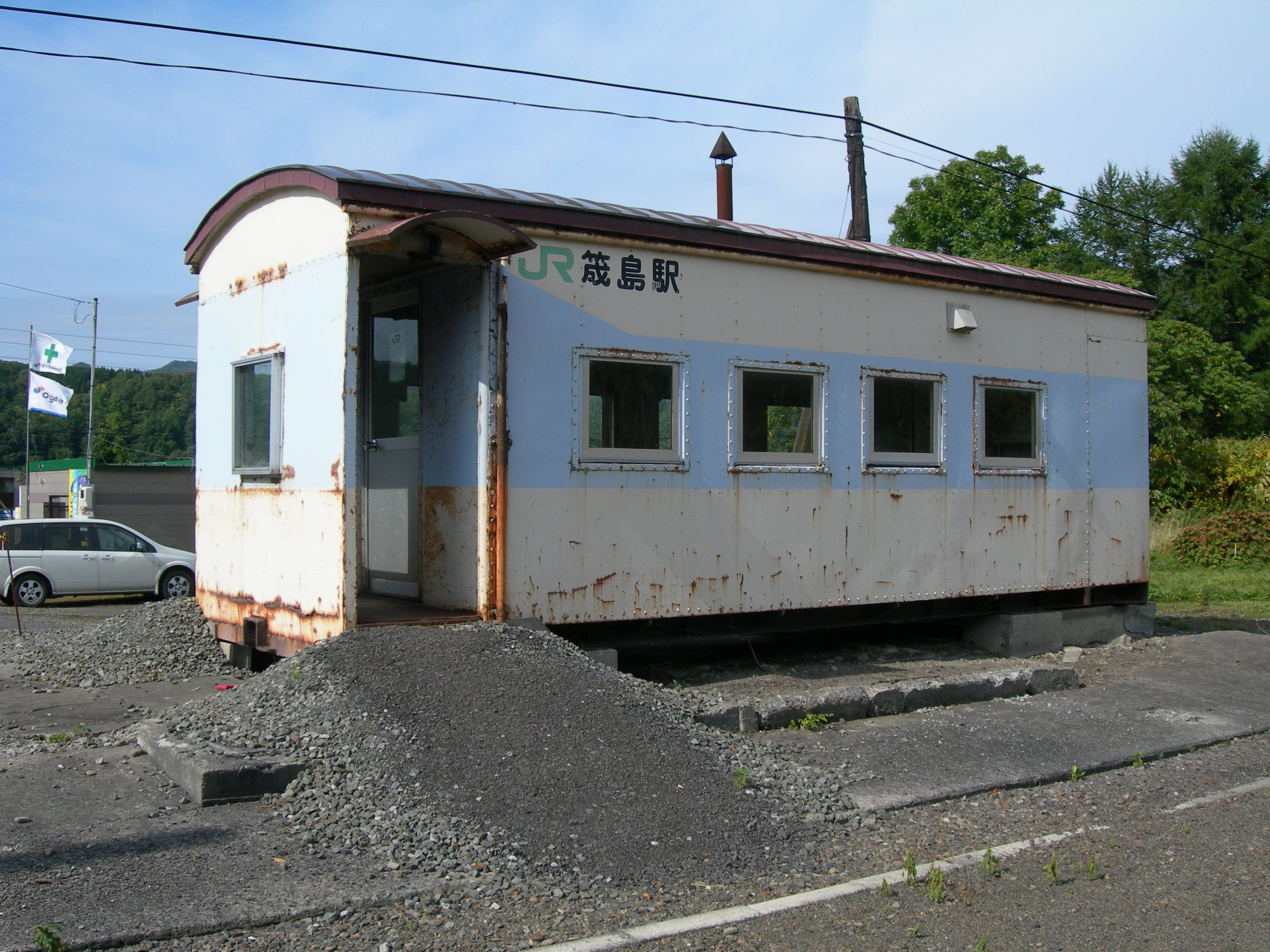
Station building in September 2009, before renovation

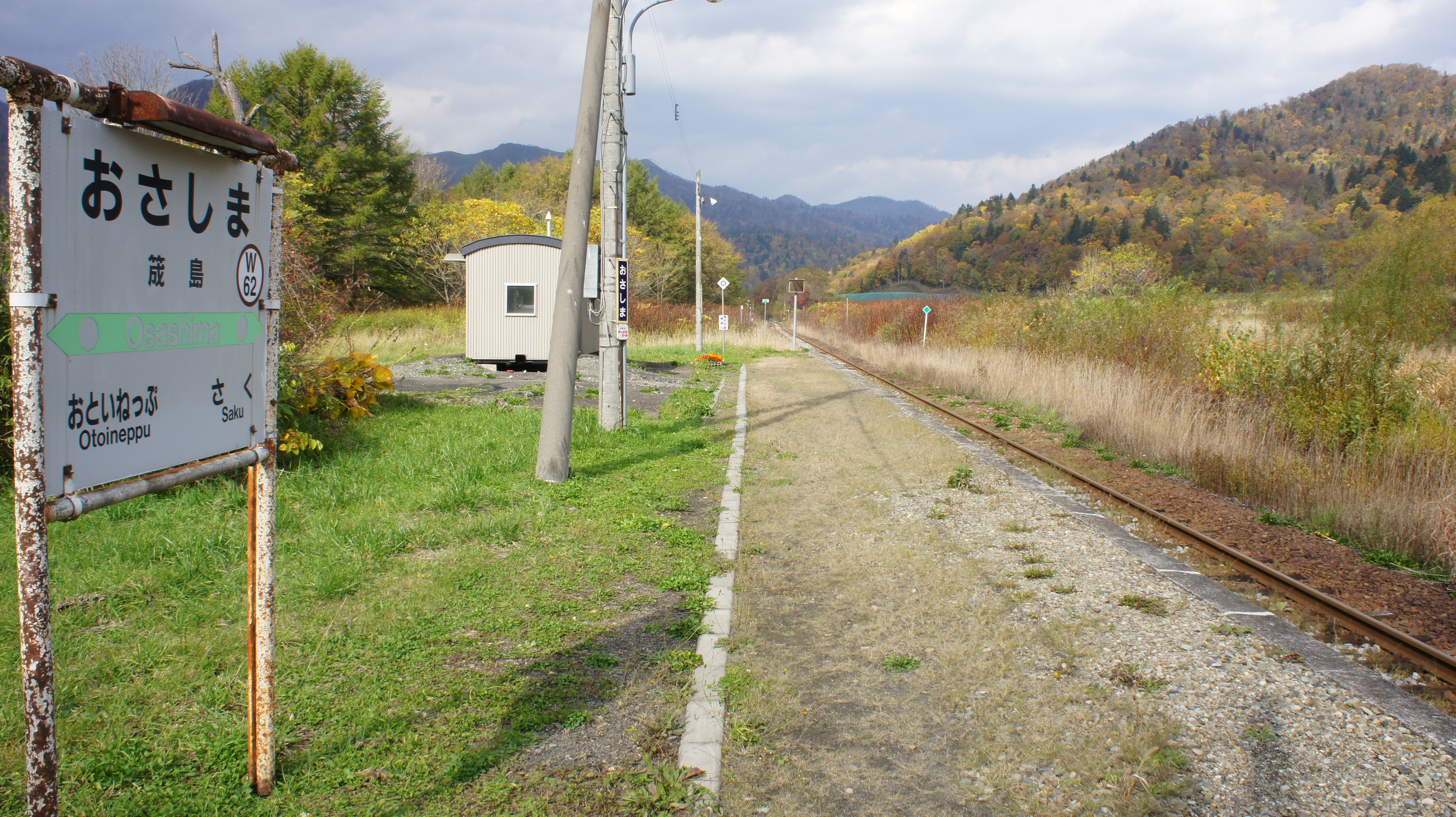
Platform

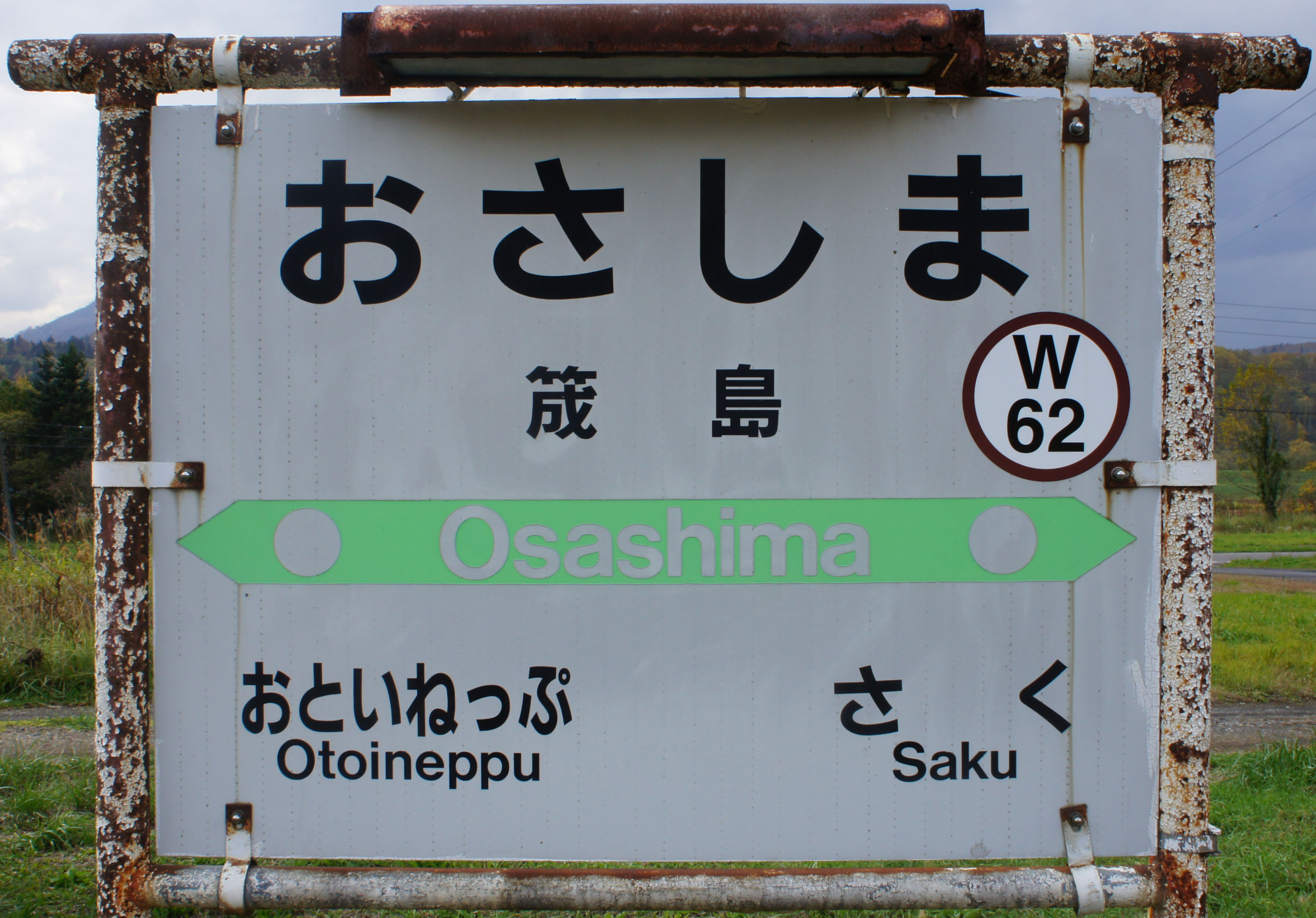
Signage

== History ==
Osashima Station opened on 8 November 1922. With the privatization of Japanese National Railways (JNR) on 1 April 1987, the station came under the control of JR Hokkaido.

In July 2016, JR Hokkaido informed the local government of its intention to close the station from the start of the revised timetable in March 2017 due to low patronage. However, in April 2017, it was announced that JR Hokkaido would continue to maintain the station for the time being. In June 2023, this station was selected to be among 42 stations on the JR Hokkaido network to be slated for abolition owing to low ridership.

== Passenger statistics ==
During the period between fiscal 2011 and 2015, the station was used on average by less than one passenger daily.

== Surrounding area ==
- Japan National Route 40
- Teshio River

== See also ==
- List of railway stations in Japan
