= Minami-Horonobe Station =

Railway station in Horonobe, Hokkaido, Japan

W70 Minami-Horonobe Station 南幌延駅
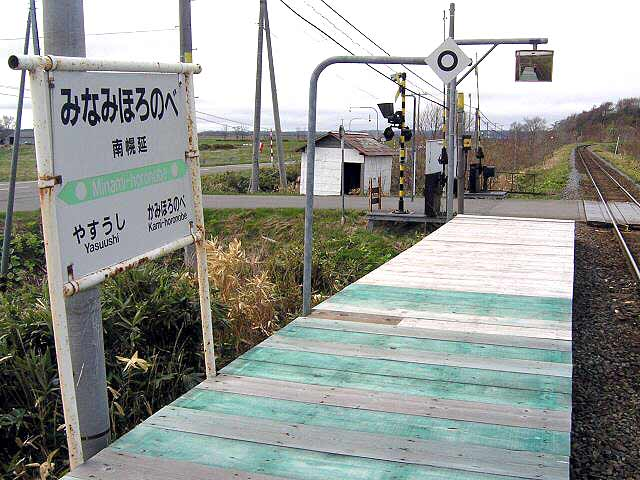
- Minami-Horonobe Station platform in May 2005

General information
- Location: Minami-horonobe, Horonobe-chō, Teshio-gun, Hokkaidō 098-3200; Japan
- Coordinates: 44°57′54.9″N 141°53′4.8″E
- System: regional rail
- Operator: JR Hokkaido
- Line: Sōya Main Line
- Distance: 191.6 km (119.1 mi) from Asahikawa
- Platforms: 1 side platform
- Tracks: 1

Construction
- Structure type: At grade

Other information
- Status: Unstaffed
- Station code: W70
- Website: Official website

History
- Opened: 1 November 1959
- Closed: 15 March 2025

Passengers
- 2022: >1 daily

Services
Preceding station	JR Hokkaido	Following station
Horonobe W72 towards Wakkanai	Sōya Main Line Local	Onoppunai W68 towards Asahikawa
Location
- Location within Hokkaido Location within Japan

Minami-Horonobe Station (南幌延駅, Minami-Horonobe-eki) was a railway station located in the town of Horonobe, Hokkaidō, Japan. It was operated by JR Hokkaido.

== Lines ==
Minami-Horonobe Station was served by the Soya Main Line, and was located 191.6 km from the starting point of the line at Asahikawa. The station was numbered "W70".

== Station layout ==
The station had a single side platform serving a single bidirectional track. The platform was located on the west side of the track (on the left hand side when heading towards Wakkanai). The station was unstaffed.

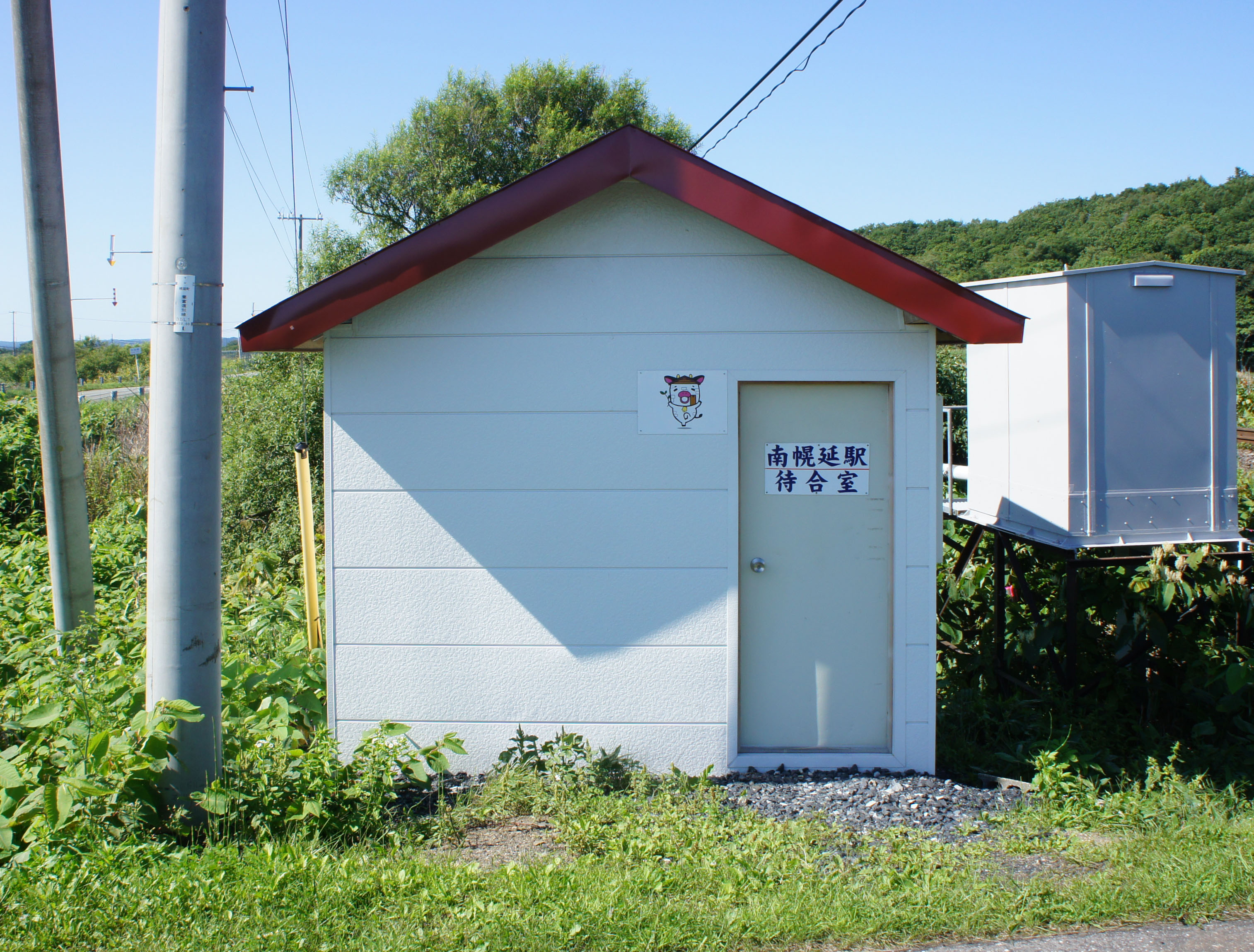
Waiting room

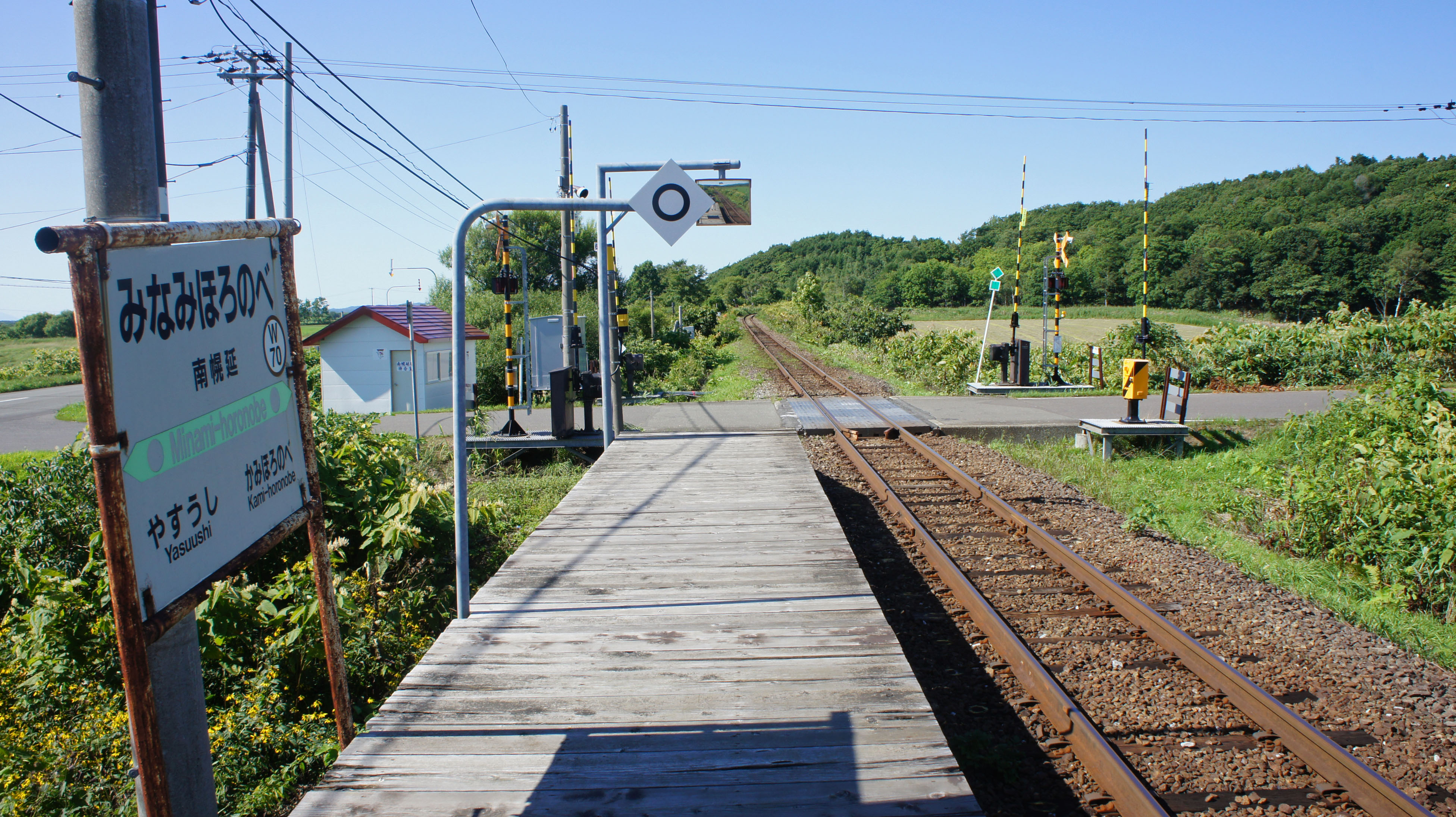
Platform

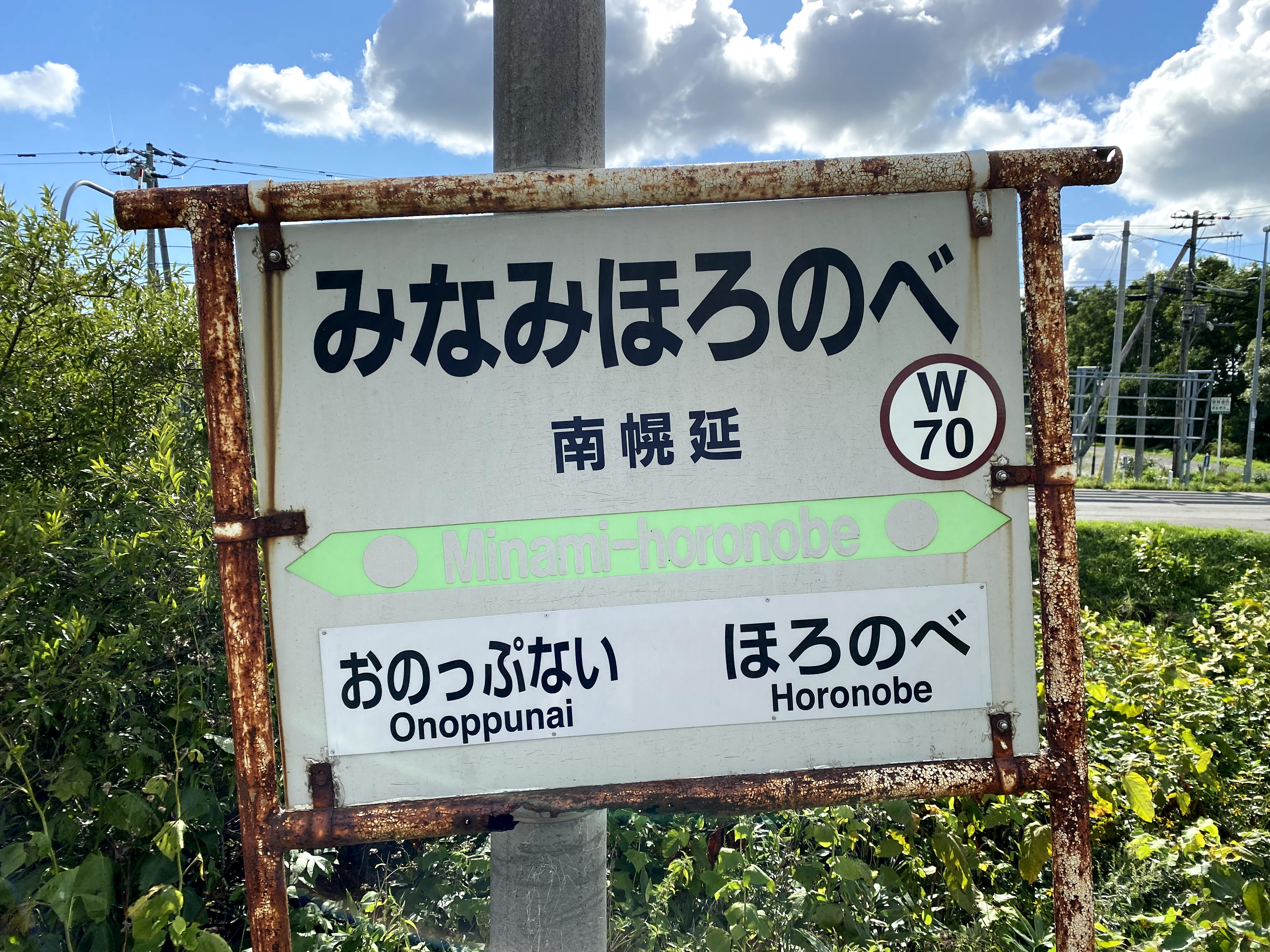
Signage

== History ==
The station opened on 1 November 1959. With the privatization of Japanese National Railways (JNR) on 1 April 1987, the station came under the control of JR Hokkaido.

In September 2016, JR Hokkaido announced that it intended to close the station along with two other unstaffed stations on the line (Shimonuma and Nukanan) in March 2017, due to low passenger usage. However, this move was strongly opposed by the mayor and residents of Horonobe town, which announced that it was assume management of the station out of its own funds to prevent closure. On July 3, 2024, due to the need for station building repair costs, Horonobe Town notified JR Hokkaido that it would not pay maintenance costs for fiscal year 2025. On 15 March 2025, the station was closed after the last train served the station the day before.

== Passenger statistics ==
In fiscal 2015, the station was used on average by less than one passenger daily.

== Surrounding area ==
- Teshio River

== See also ==
- List of railway stations in Japan
