= Saku Station =

Railway station in Nakagawa, Hokkaido, Japan

W63 Saku Station 佐久駅
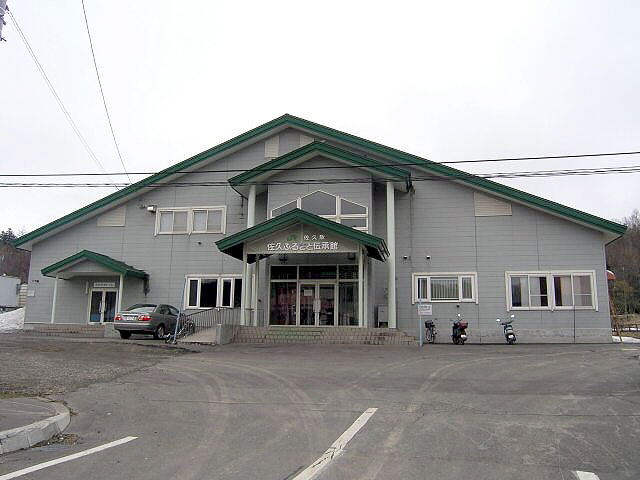
- Saku Station building in October 2017

General information
- Location: Saku, Nakagawa-cho, Nakagawa-gun, Hokkaido 098-2622; Japan
- Coordinates: 45°0′52.6″N 141°50′45.3″E
- System: regional rail
- Operator: JR Hokkaido
- Line: Sōya Main Line
- Distance: 153.6 km (95.4 mi) from Asahikawa
- Platforms: 1 side platform

Construction
- Structure type: At grade

Other information
- Status: Unattended
- Station code: W63
- Website: Official website

History
- Opened: 8 November 1922

Passengers
- 2022: 0.8 daily

Services
Preceding station	JR Hokkaido	Following station
Teshio-Nakagawa towards Wakkanai	Sōya Main Line Local	Osashima towards Asahikawa
Location
- Location within Hokkaido Location within Japan

Saku Station (佐久駅, Saku-eki) is a railway station located in the town of Nakagawa, Hokkaidō, Japan. It is operated by JR Hokkaido.

== Lines ==
The station is served by the Sōya Main Line and is located 153.6 km from the starting point of the line at Asahikawa.

== Layout ==
Saku Station once had two side platforms connected by a level crossing, but one platform is no longer in use. The station is unattended, and managed by Nakagawa town. The station building is located on the west side of the premises, adjacent to the south side of the platform. The current station building is called the "Saku Furusato Denshokan" and was renovated in 1990. Inside the building, paintings of the old station building, local antiques and farm equipment, excavated ammonite fossils, and paintings of horse-drawn sleighs are on display.

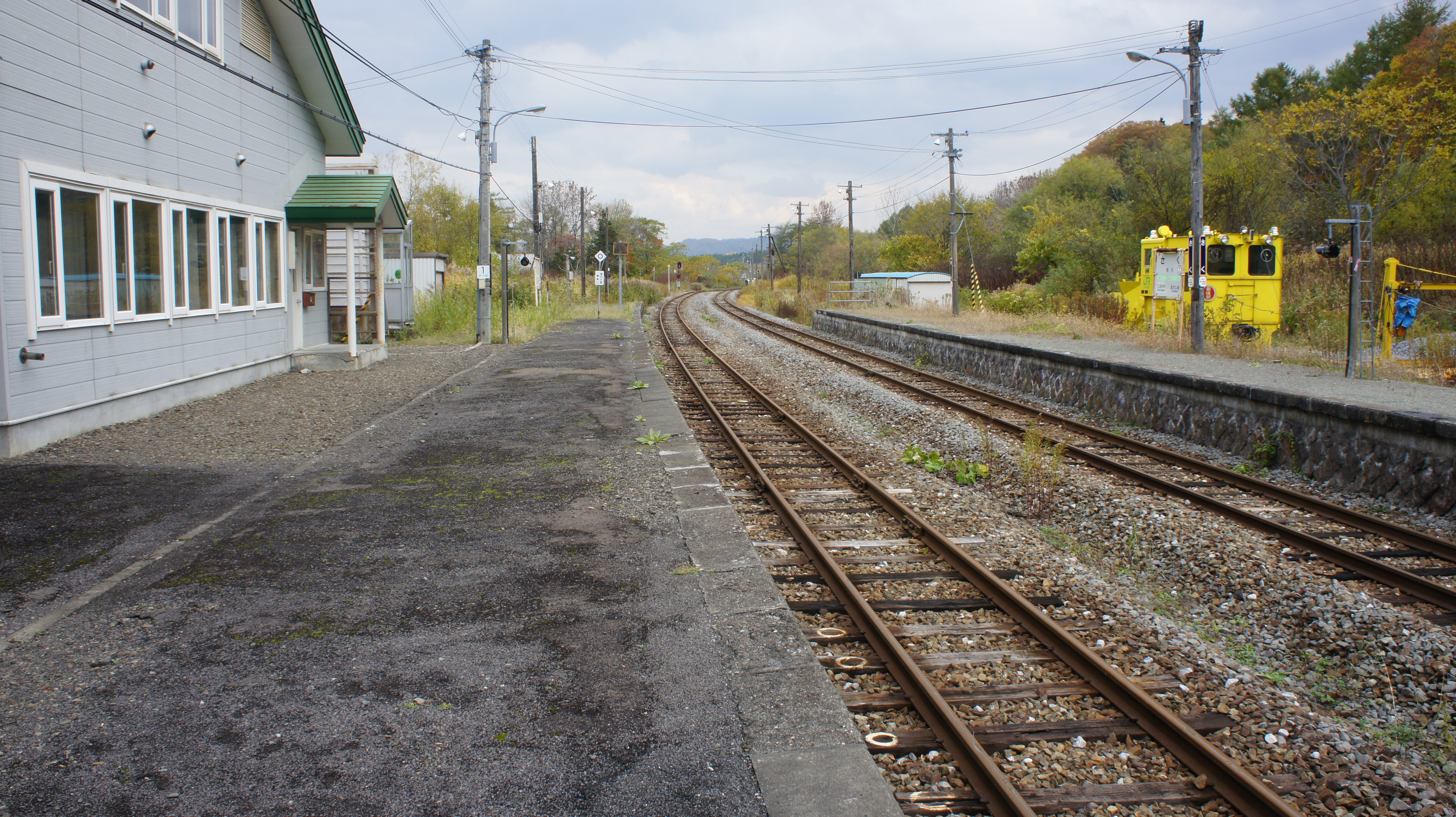
Platforms in 2017

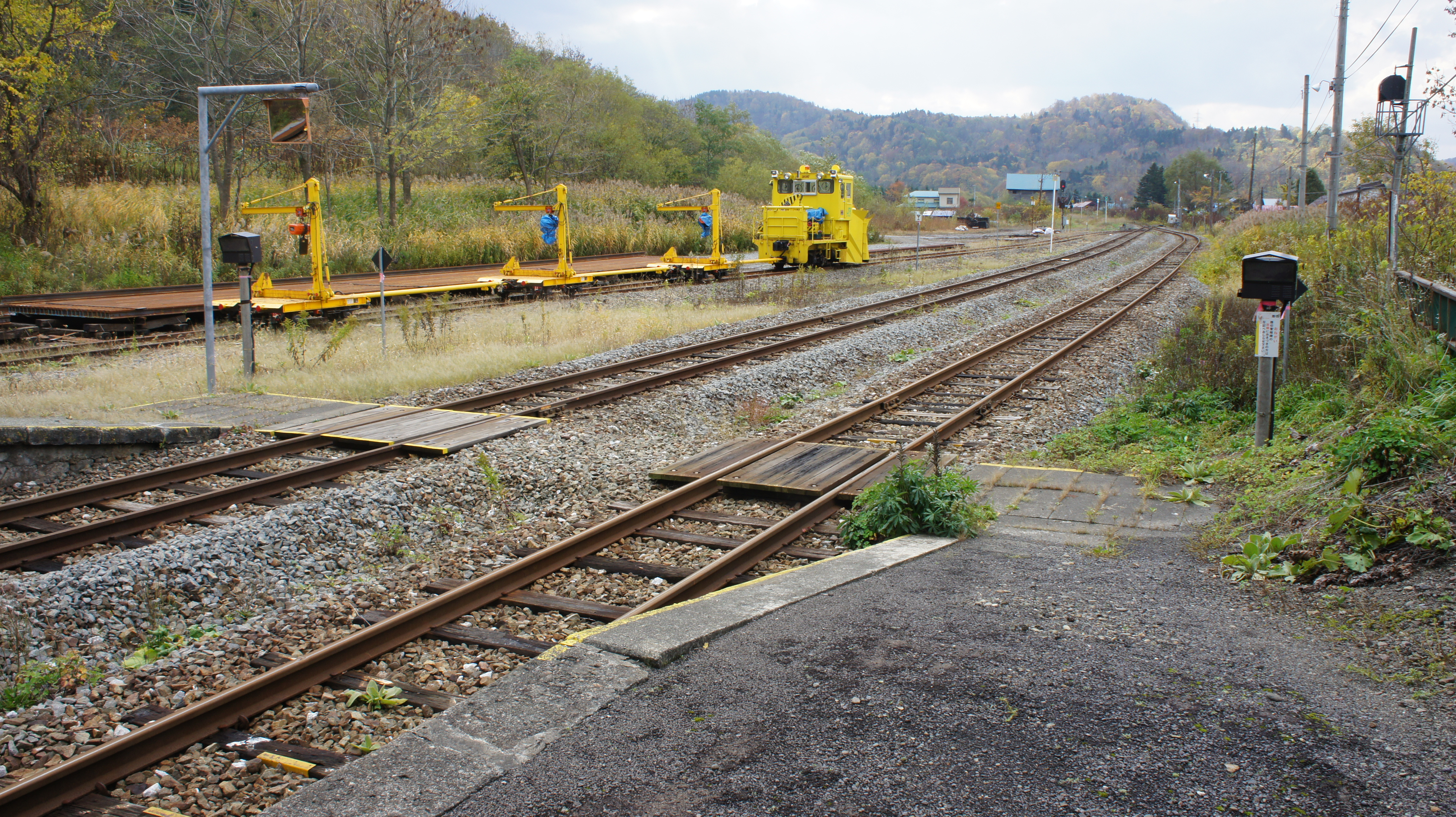
Level Crossing

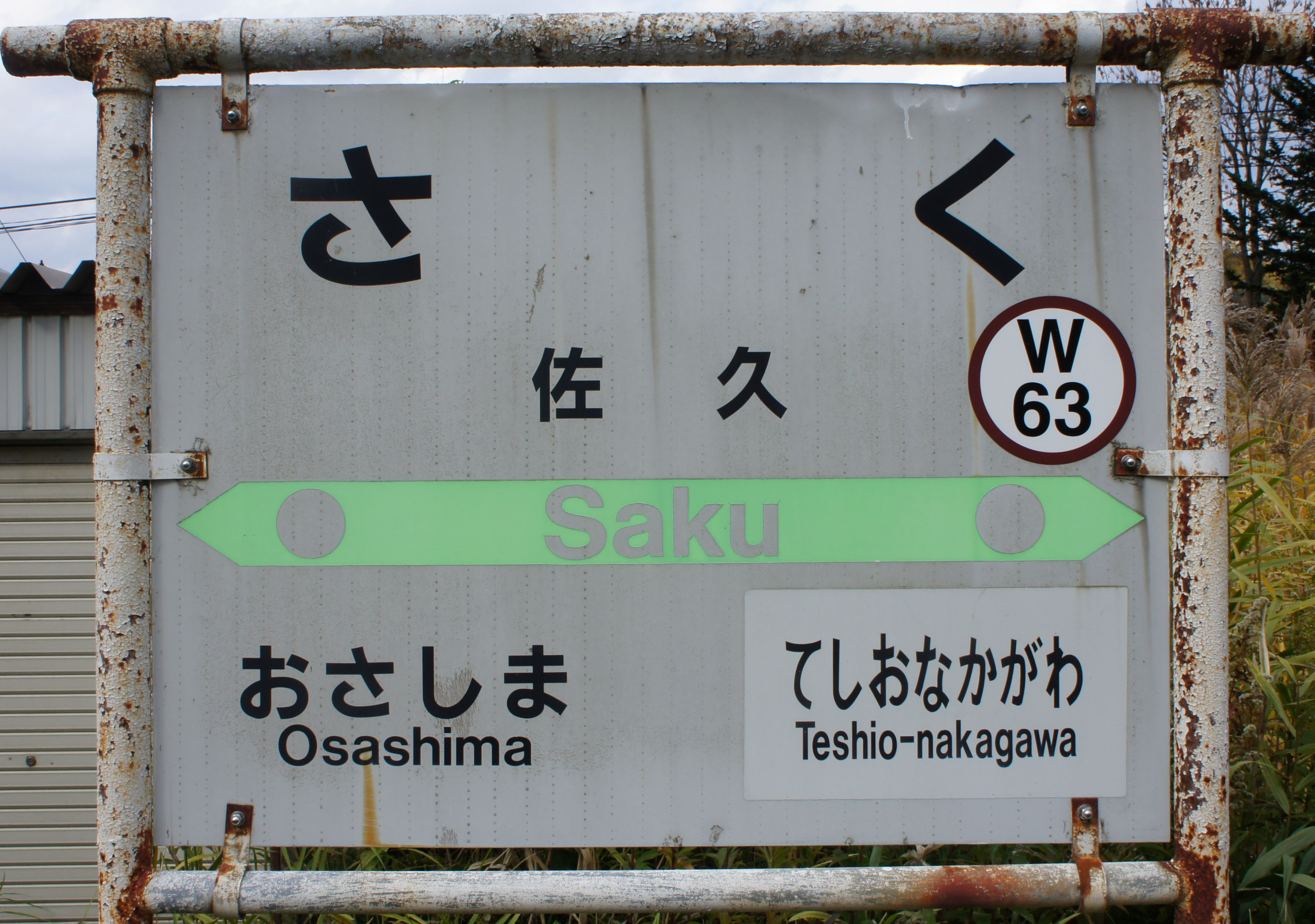
Signage

== History ==
The station was opened on 8 November 1922 with the opening of the Japanese Government Railways (JGR) Teshio Line. On April 1, 1930 the Teshio Line was incorporated into the Sōya Main Line. With the privatization of Japanese National Railways (JNR), the successor of JGR, on 1 April 1987, JR Hokkaido took over control of the station. The old station building was demolished in September 1990 and new station building completed in January 1991. In July 2019 JR Hokkaido proposed to local governments along the Sōya Main Line that stations with an average daily passenger load of three or less, including this station, be either maintained by the local government or kept open at their own expense, or closed in March 2021. After that, Nakagawa Town announced that it would maintain this station.

== Passenger statistics ==
In fiscal 2022, the station was used by an average of 0.8 passengers daily.

== Surrounding area ==
- Japan National Route 40

== See also ==
- List of railway stations in Japan
