= Shimonuma Station =

Railway station in Horonobe, Hokkaido, Japan

W73 Shimonuma Station 下沼駅
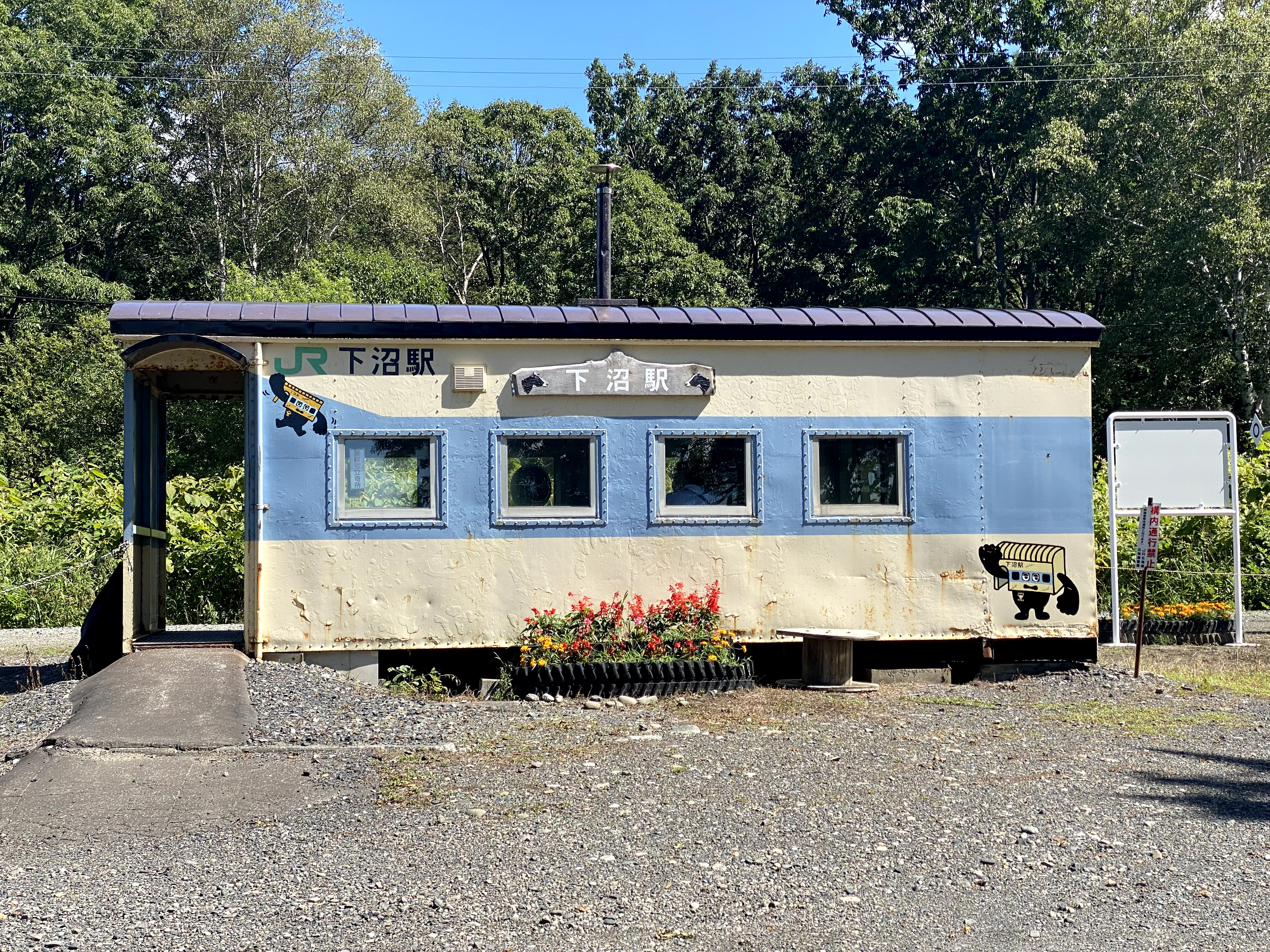
- Shimonuma Station building in September 2021

General information
- Location: Shimonuma, Horonobe-cho, Teshio-gun, Hokkaido 098-3228; Japan
- Coordinates: 45°2′13.5″N 141°45′29″E
- System: regional rail
- Operator: JR Hokkaido
- Line: Sōya Main Line
- Distance: 207.2 km (128.7 mi) from Asahikawa
- Platforms: 1 side platform
- Tracks: 1

Construction
- Structure type: At grade

Other information
- Status: Unstaffed
- Station code: W73
- Website: www.jrhokkaido.co.jp/network/station/station.html#4507

History
- Opened: 25 September 1926
- Rebuilt: 1985

Passengers
- 2022: >1 daily

Services
Preceding station	JR Hokkaido	Following station
Toyotomi towards Wakkanai	Sōya Main Line Local	Horonobe towards Asahikawa
Location
- Location within Hokkaido Location within Japan

Shimonuma Station (下沼駅, Shimonuma-eki) is a railway station located within the boundaries of the town of Horonobe, Teshio District, Hokkaidō, Japan. The area surrounding the station is a forested area off National Route 40. The station is operated by JR Hokkaido. The station is numbered "W73".

== Lines ==
The station is served by the Sōya Main Line and is located 207.2 km from the starting point of the line at Asahikawa. Only local trains serve the station. Only local trains stop at this station.

== Station layout ==
The station has a single side platform serving a single side track. The current station building is a re-purposed JNR Yo3500 caboose parked on the foundations of the original wooden station building.

The original layout of the station prior to its conversion to a freight car station was two tracks served by a single raised platform between the two tracks.

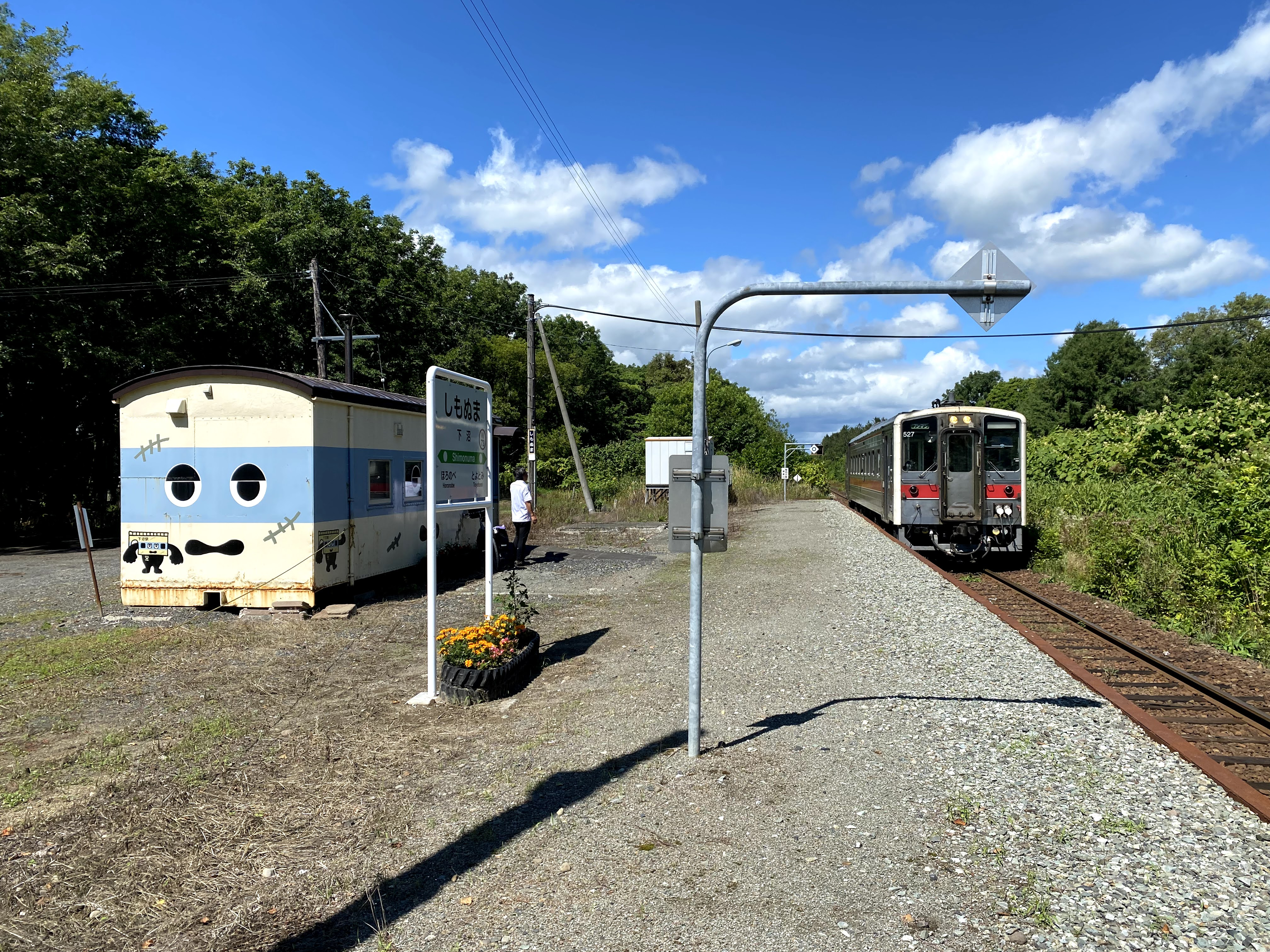
Platform

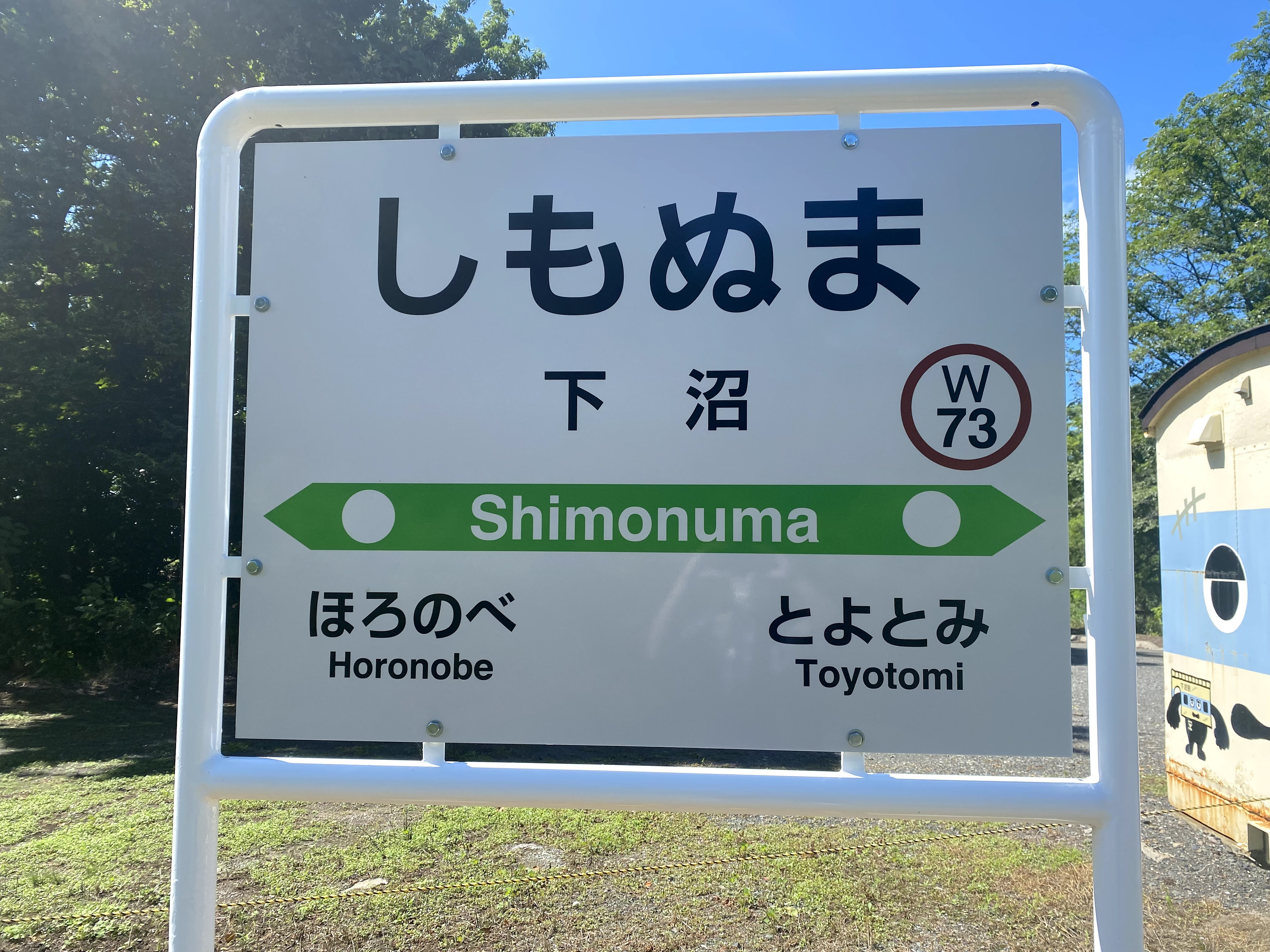
signage

== History ==
Shimonuma Station opened on 25 September 1926 with the extension of the Japanese Government Railways (JGR) Teshio Line between Horonobe Station and Kabutonuma Station. On April 1, 1930, the Teshio Line was incorporated into the Sōya Main Line. The original station was a staffed wooden station building, but it became an unstaffed station in 1984. The wooden station was then demolished and converted into a freight car station in 1985. With the privatization of Japanese National Railways (JNR) on 1 April 1987, the station came under the control of JR Hokkaido.

In September 2016, after conducting a five-year passenger survey from 2011 to 2015, JR Hokkaido announced that it intended to close the station along with two other unstaffed stations on the line (Minami-Horonobe and Nukanan) due to low passenger usage. The intended closure date was March 2017. However, this move was strongly opposed by the mayor and residents of Horonobe town, which formed a “my station campaign” to oppose the closure.

The town announced that it would assume management of the station out of its own funds to prevent closure, covering the necessary maintenance costs. The metal walls of the freight car making up the body of the station had seriously corroded, and the town paid to stabilise and repaint them between June and August 2017. During the refurbishment they added the painted image of “Numahikyon”, an image character chosen by the townsfolk through a public contest to create a character based on the theme “The Yokai who lives in the station”. Numahikyon's head is a representation of the station building, which a simple black body, arms and legs.

The town hoped that the station could develop the areas tourism potential and serve "as a gateway to tourist resources such as the Sarobetsu Marsh".

This initiative has proven successful, with an increase in passenger numbers including tourists visiting the station itself.

== Passenger statistics ==
In fiscal 2015, the station was used on average by less than one passenger daily. The figures as of 2021 are roughly 0.4 passengers a day.

== Surrounding area ==
- National Route 40
- Sarobetsu Plain

== See also ==
- List of railway stations in Japan
