= Teshio-Nakagawa Station =

Railway station in Nakagawa, Hokkaido, Japan

W64 Teshio-Nakagawa Station 天塩中川駅
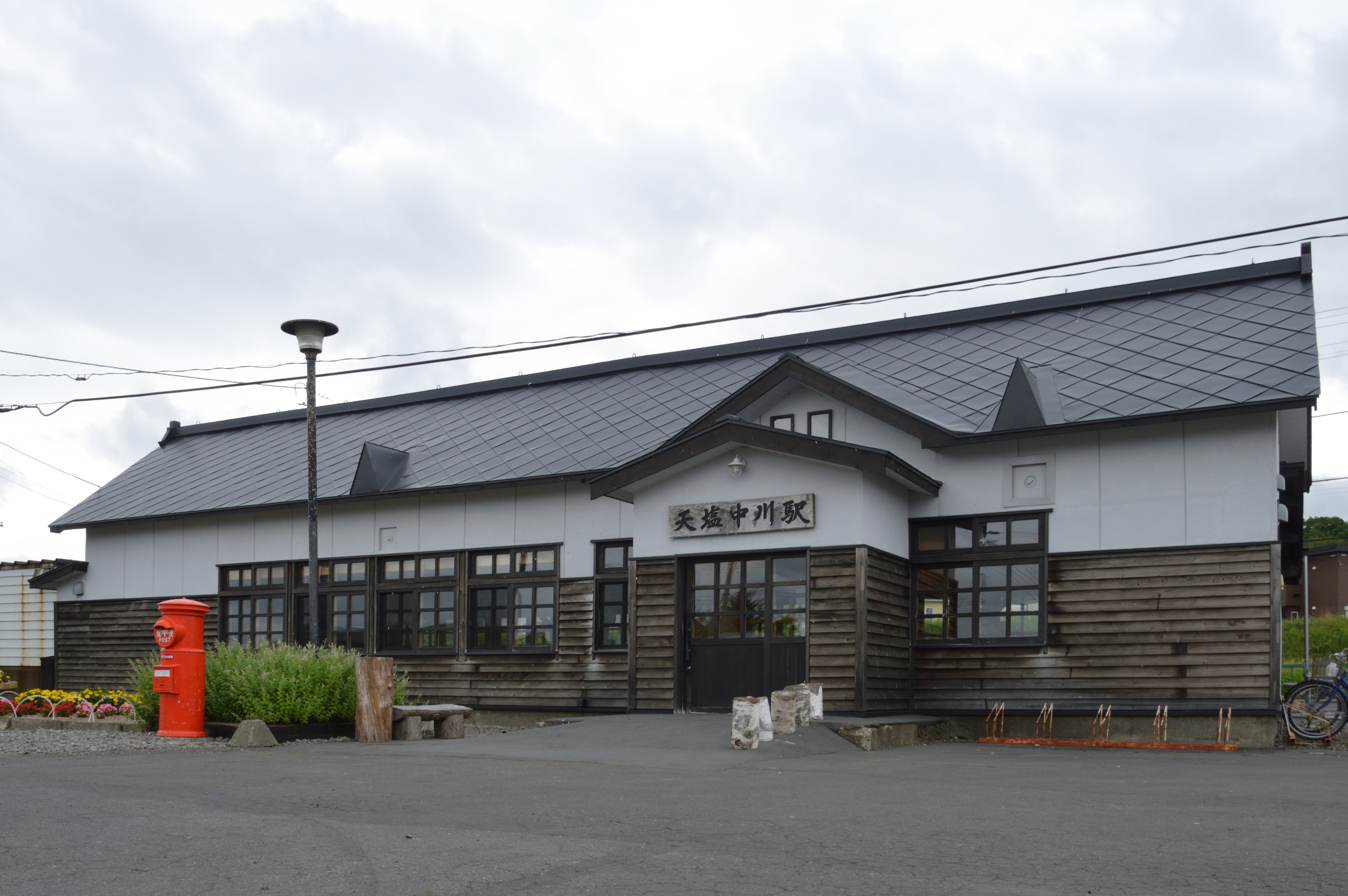
- Teshio-Nakagawa Station in August 2017

General information
- Location: Nakagawa, Nakagawa-cho, Nakagawa-gun, Hokkaido 098-2802; Japan
- Coordinates: 44.8118°N 142.0754°E
- System: regional rail
- Operator: JR Hokkaido
- Line: Sōya Main Line
- Distance: 161.9 km from Asahikawa
- Platforms: 2 side platforms
- Tracks: 2

Other information
- Status: Unstaffed
- Station code: W64
- Website: Official website

History
- Opened: 8 November 1922
- Former names: Ponpira (until July 1951)

Passengers
- FY2022: 5.4 daily

Services
Preceding station	JR Hokkaido	Following station
Toikanbetsu W66 towards Wakkanai	Sōya Main Line Local	Saku W63 towards Asahikawa
Horonobe W72 towards Wakkanai	Sōya Main Line Sōya / Sarobetsu	Otoineppu W61 towards Asahikawa
Location
- Location within Hokkaido Location within Japan

Teshio-Nakagawa Station (天塩中川駅, Teshio-Nakagawa-eki) is a railway station located in the town of Nakagawa, Hokkaidō, Japan. It is operated by JR Hokkaido.

== Lines ==
The station is served by the Sōya Main Line, and lies 161.9 km from the starting point of the line at Asahikawa.

== Layout ==
Teshio-Nakagawa Station has two side platforms connected by a level crossing. The station is unattended, and managed by Nakagawa town. The station building is located on the west side of the station premises, adjacent to the center of platform 1. The current station building was completed in 1953. Nakagawa Town took over the building from JR Hokkaido in 2014, and renovated it using locally grown Japanese cedar to recreate the original atmosphere. The old station office next to the waiting room was renovated to create the town's event space, Nakagawa Town Communication Plaza.

=== Platforms ===
1	■ Sōya Main Line	for Wakkanai/Asahikawa
2	■ Sōya Main Line	for Asahikawa

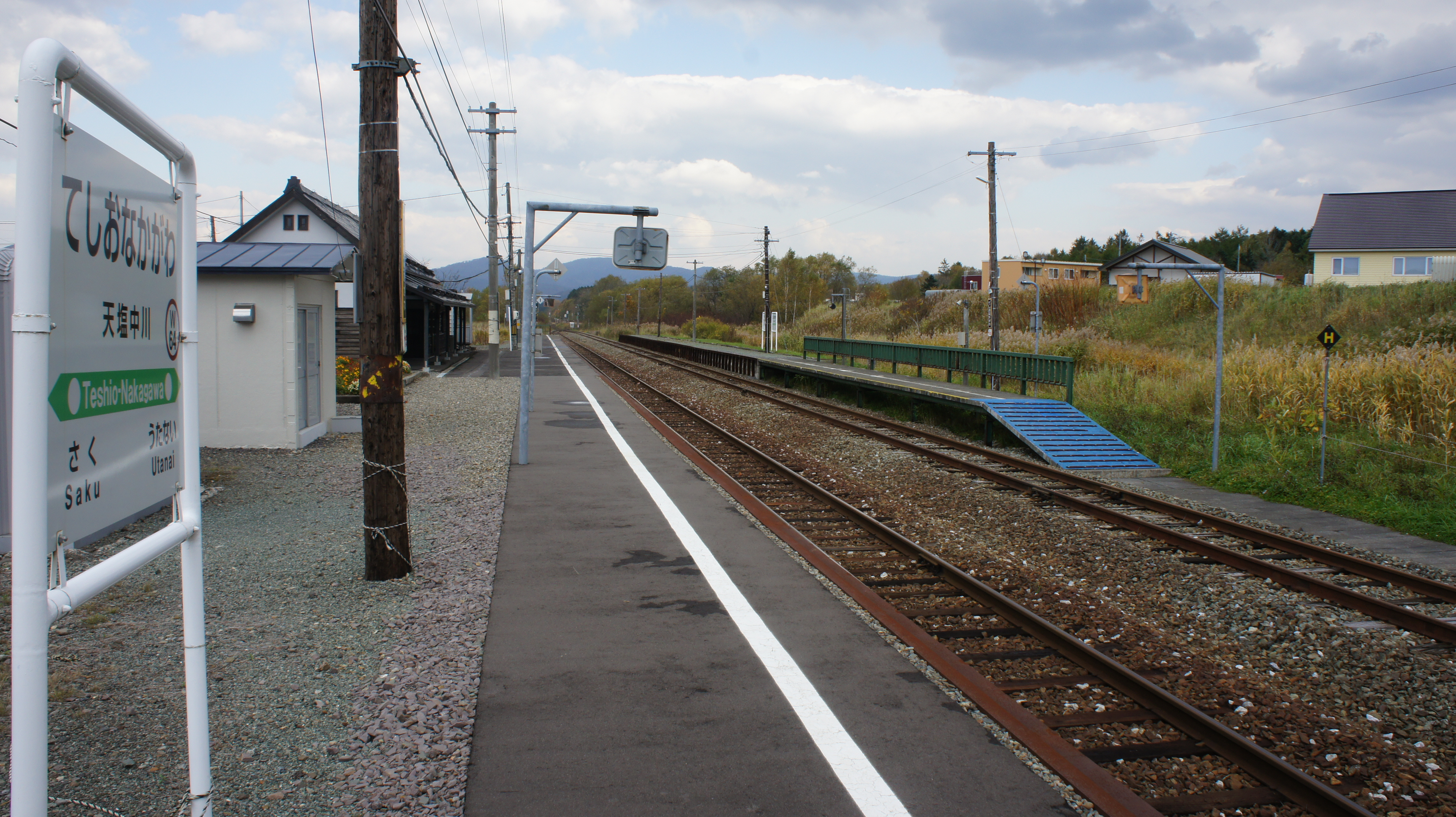
The platforms in October 2017

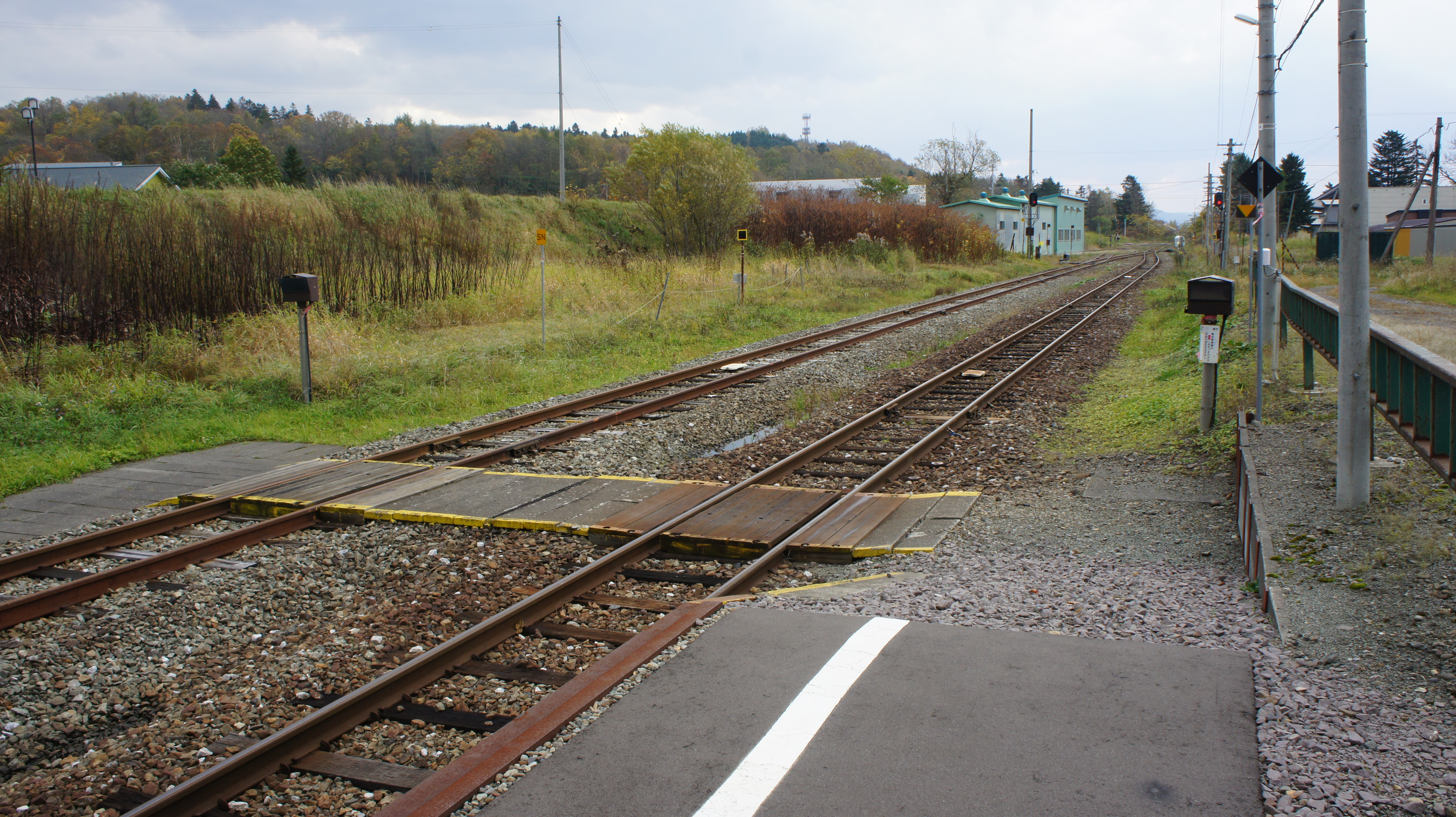
The level crossing for passengers between the platforms in October 2017

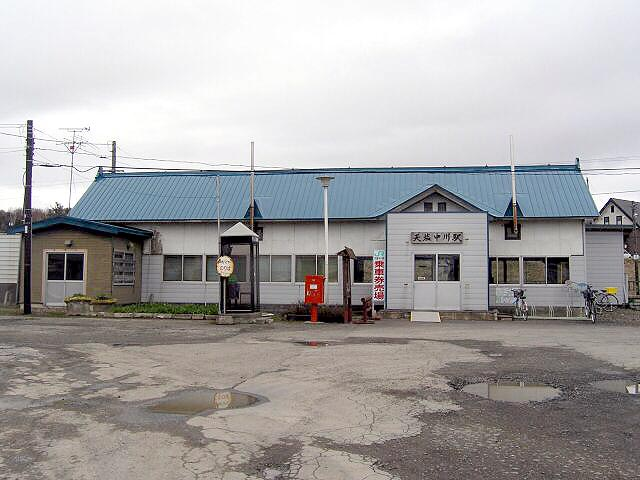
The station in May 2005, before renovation

== History ==
The station opened on 8 November 1922, originally named Ponpira Station (誉平駅). It was renamed Teshio-Nakagawa Station on 20 July 1951. With the privatization of Japanese National Railways (JNR) on 1 April 1987, the station came under the control of JR Hokkaido.

== Passenger statistics ==
In fiscal 2022, the station was used by an average of 5.4 passengers daily.

== Surrounding area ==
- Nakagawa Town Hall

== See also ==
- List of railway stations in Japan
