= Onoppunai Station =

Railway station in Horonobe, Hokkaido, Japan

W68 Onoppunai Station 雄信内駅
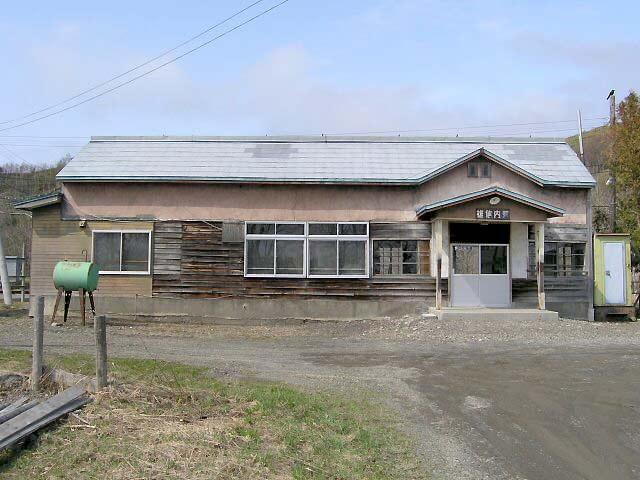
- Onoppunai Station

General information
- Location: Yuko, Horonobe-chō, Teshio-gun, Hokkaidō 098-3251; Japan
- Coordinates: 44°54′41.1″N 141°56′9.5″E
- System: regional rail
- Operator: JR Hokkaido
- Line: Sōya Main Line
- Distance: 183.7 km (114.1 mi) from Asahikawa
- Platforms: 2 side platforms

Construction
- Structure type: At grade

Other information
- Status: Unstaffed
- Station code: W68

History
- Opened: 20 July 1925
- Closed: 15 March 2025

Passengers
- 2022: >1 daily

Services
Preceding station	JR Hokkaido	Following station
Minami-Horonobe W70 towards Wakkanai	Sōya Main Line Local	Nukanan W67 towards Asahikawa
Location
- Location within Hokkaido Location within Japan

Onoppunai Station (雄信内駅, Onoppunai-eki) was a railway station located in the town of Horonobe, Hokkaidō, Japan. It was operated by JR Hokkaido. The station was numbered "W68".

== Lines ==
Onoppunai Station was served by the Soya Main Line, and was located 183.7 km from the starting point of the line at Asahikawa.

== Station layout ==
The station consisted of two opposed side platforms connected by a level crossing. The station was unstaffed during the years before its closure.

=== Platforms ===
1	■ Soya Main Line	for Wakkanai
2	■ Soya Main Line	for Nayoro and Asahikawa

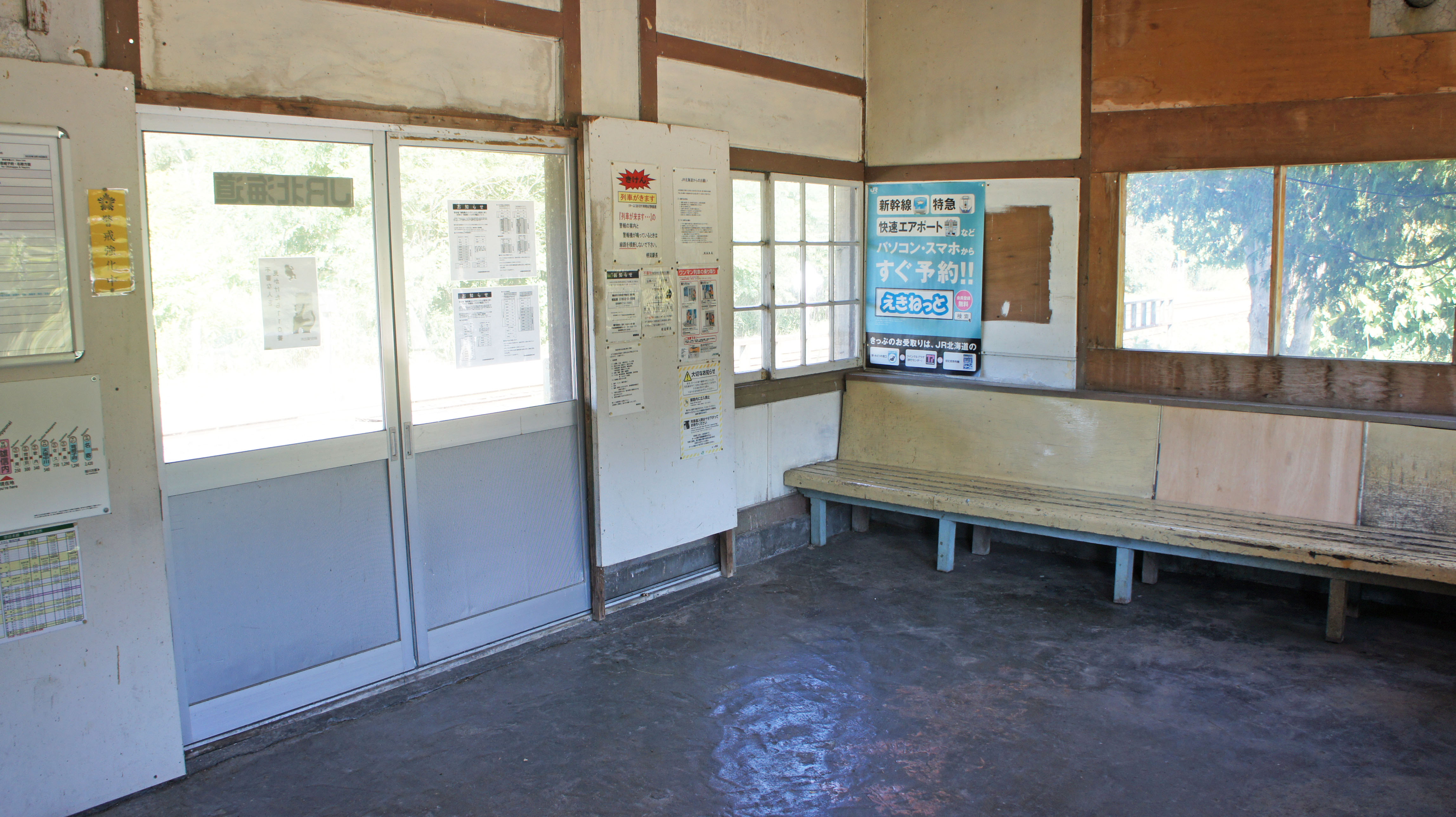
Waiting room

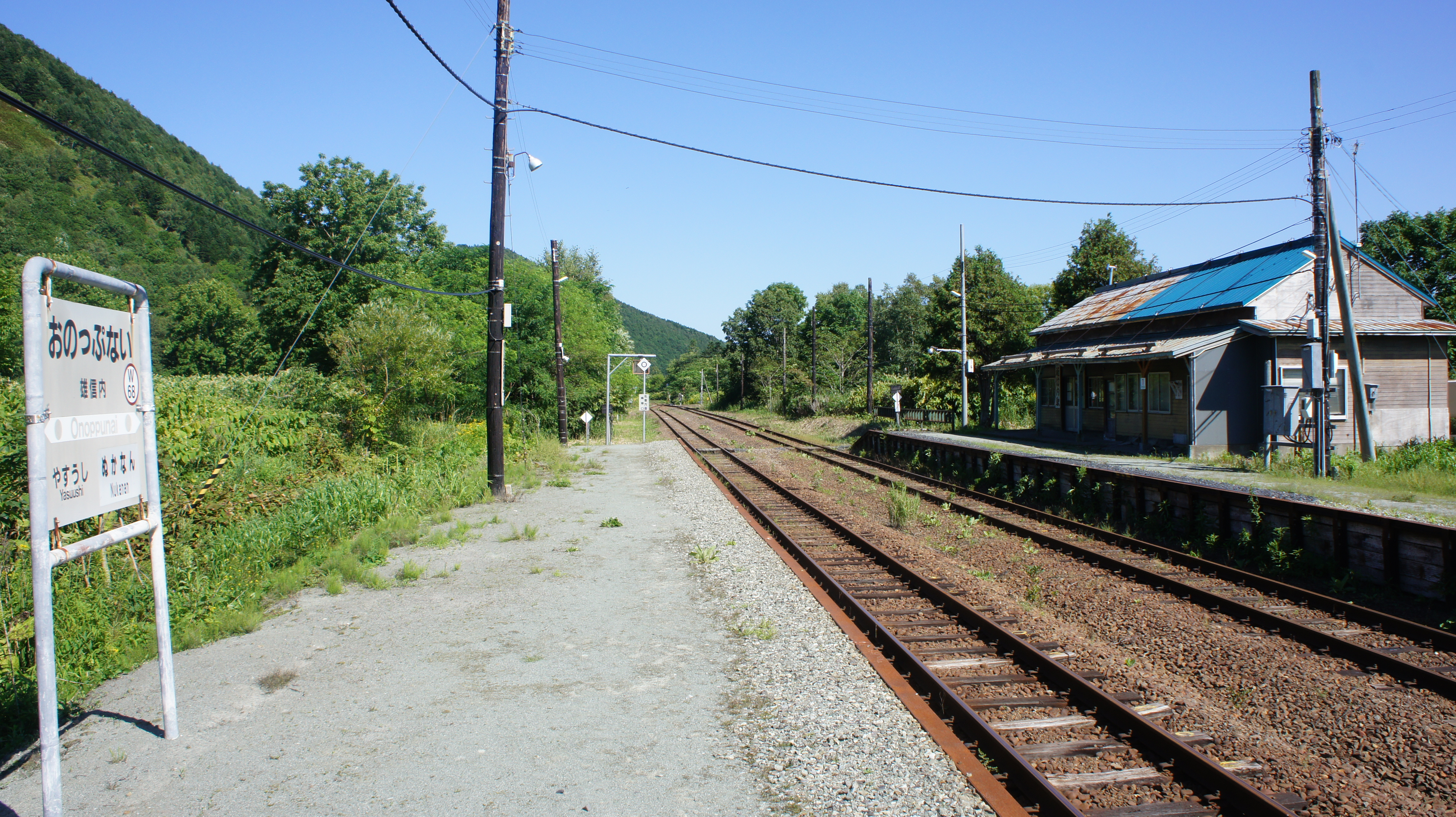
Platform

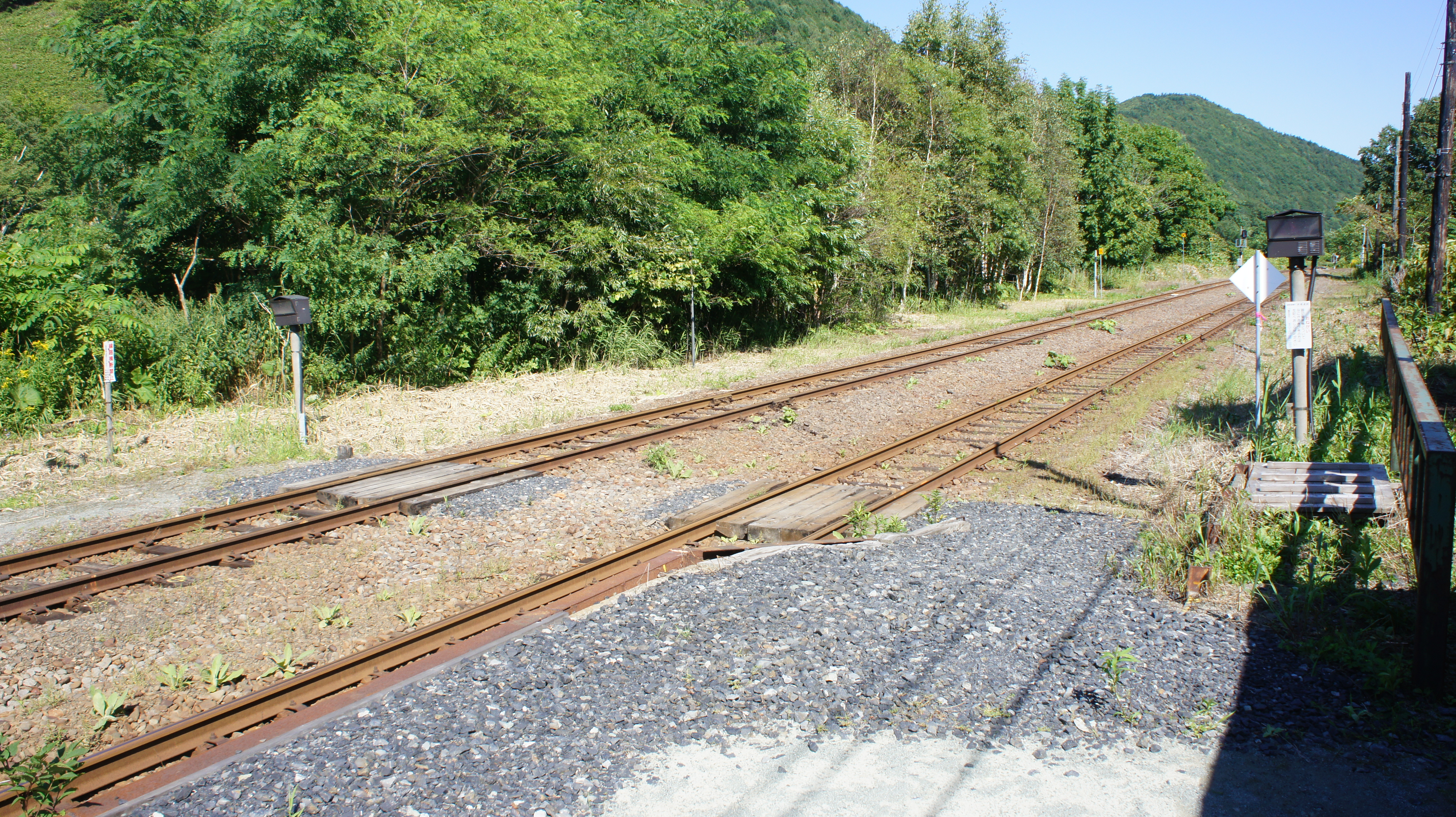
Level crossing

== History ==
The station was opened on 20 July 1925 with the opening of the Japanese Government Railways (JGR) Teshio South Line. On 1 April 1930, the Teshio Line was incorporated into the Sōya Main Line. With the privatization of Japanese National Railways (JNR), the successor of JGR, on 1 April 1987, JR Hokkaido took over control of the station.

In June 2023, the station was selected to be among 42 stations on the JR Hokkaido network to be slated for abolition owing to low ridership.

On 24 June 2024, it was reported that the station maintenance was costing 7.5 million yen per year. JR Hokkaido consulted the local residents' opinion on paying for the maintenance cost and it was ultimately decided to close the station.

On 15 March 2025, the station was closed after the last train served the station the day before. Before the closure, Onoppunai Station was reported to have a daily average ridership of only 0.2 passengers. The station building began to be demolished in September 2025.

== Passenger statistics ==
According to JR Hokkaidō, only one person used the station daily, on average.

== Surrounding area ==
- Teshio Town Office Yushinnai Branch
- Teshio Town Kaitoku Elementary and Junior High School

== See also ==
- List of railway stations in Japan
