= Nukanan Station =

Railway station in Horonobe, Hokkaido, Japan

W67 Nukanan Station 糠南駅
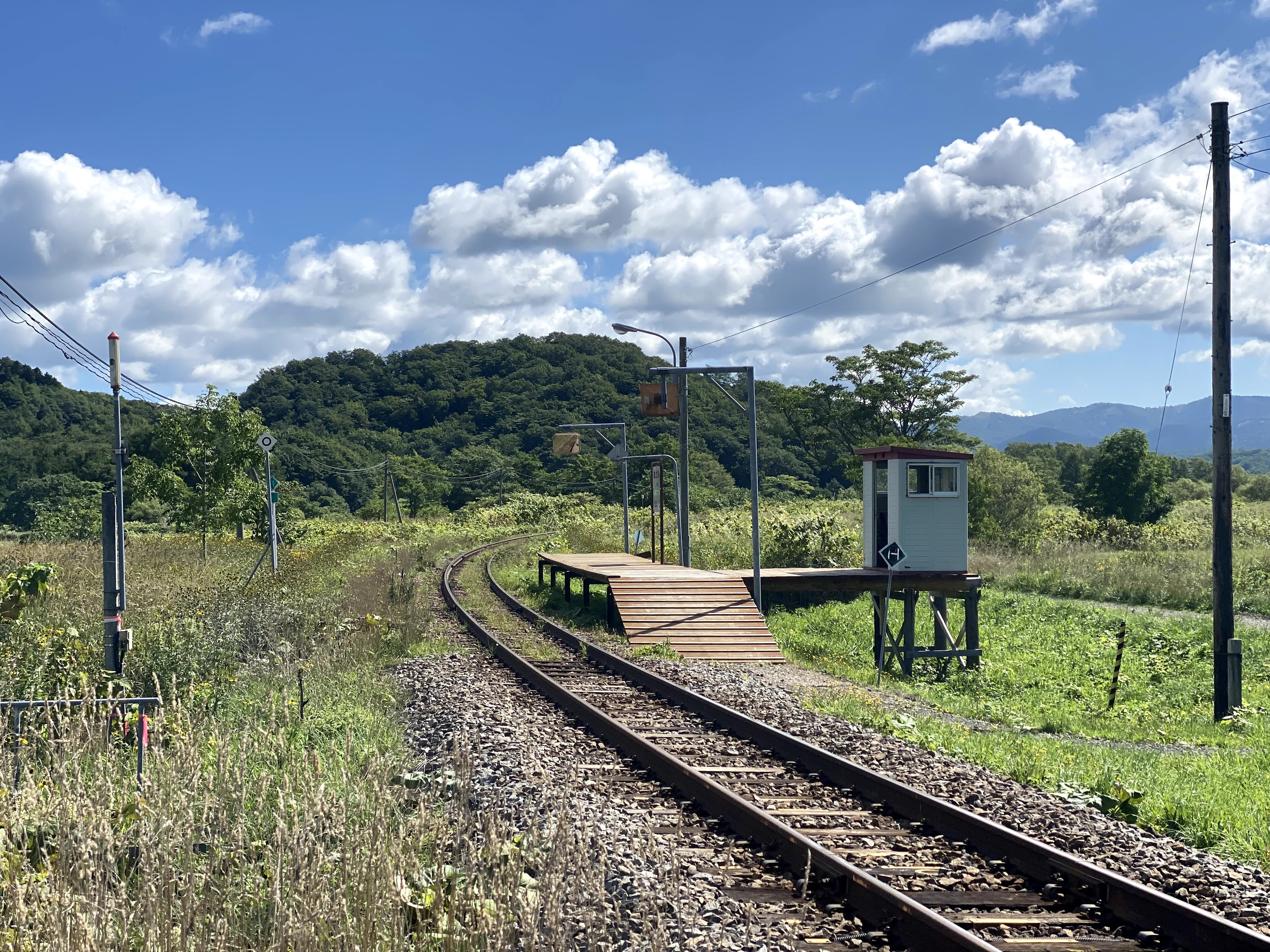
- Nukanan Station in November 2021

General information
- Location: Nukanan, Horonobe-cho, Teshio-gun, Hokkaido 098-3200; Japan
- Coordinates: 44°55′14.3″N 142°0′2.8″E
- System: regional rail
- Operator: JR Hokkaido
- Line: Sōya Main Line
- Distance: 178.0 km (110.6 mi) from Asahikawa
- Platforms: 1 side platform
- Tracks: 1

Construction
- Structure type: At grade

Other information
- Status: Unstaffed
- Station code: W67
- Website: Official website

History
- Opened: 2 December 1955

Passengers
- 2022: <1 daily

Services
Preceding station	JR Hokkaido	Following station
Horonobe W72 towards Wakkanai	Sōya Main Line Local	Toikanbetsu W66 towards Asahikawa
Location
- Location within Hokkaido Location within Japan

Nukanan Station (糠南駅, Nukanan-eki) is a railway station located in the town of Horonobe, Hokkaidō, Japan. It is operated by JR Hokkaido.

== Lines ==
The station is served by the Sōya Main Line and is located 178.0 km from the starting point of the line at Asahikawa. Only local trains stop at this station.

== Station layout ==
This is an above-ground station with one side platform and one track. It has been unattended since the station opened (managed by Horonobe Town). The platform is a wooden platform less than one car long on the south side of the track (on the left hand side facing towards Wakkanai), and is connected to the outside of the station by a slope on the Wakkanai side. There is no station building, but there is a waiting room at the same height as the platform, across a wooden walkway from the platform, which was converted from a prefabricated storehouse. There are chairs inside the shed, and in addition to displaying timetables and announcements, it also stores snow removal equipment. There used to be a wooden waiting room on the ground next to the platform, but it was demolished due to deterioration.

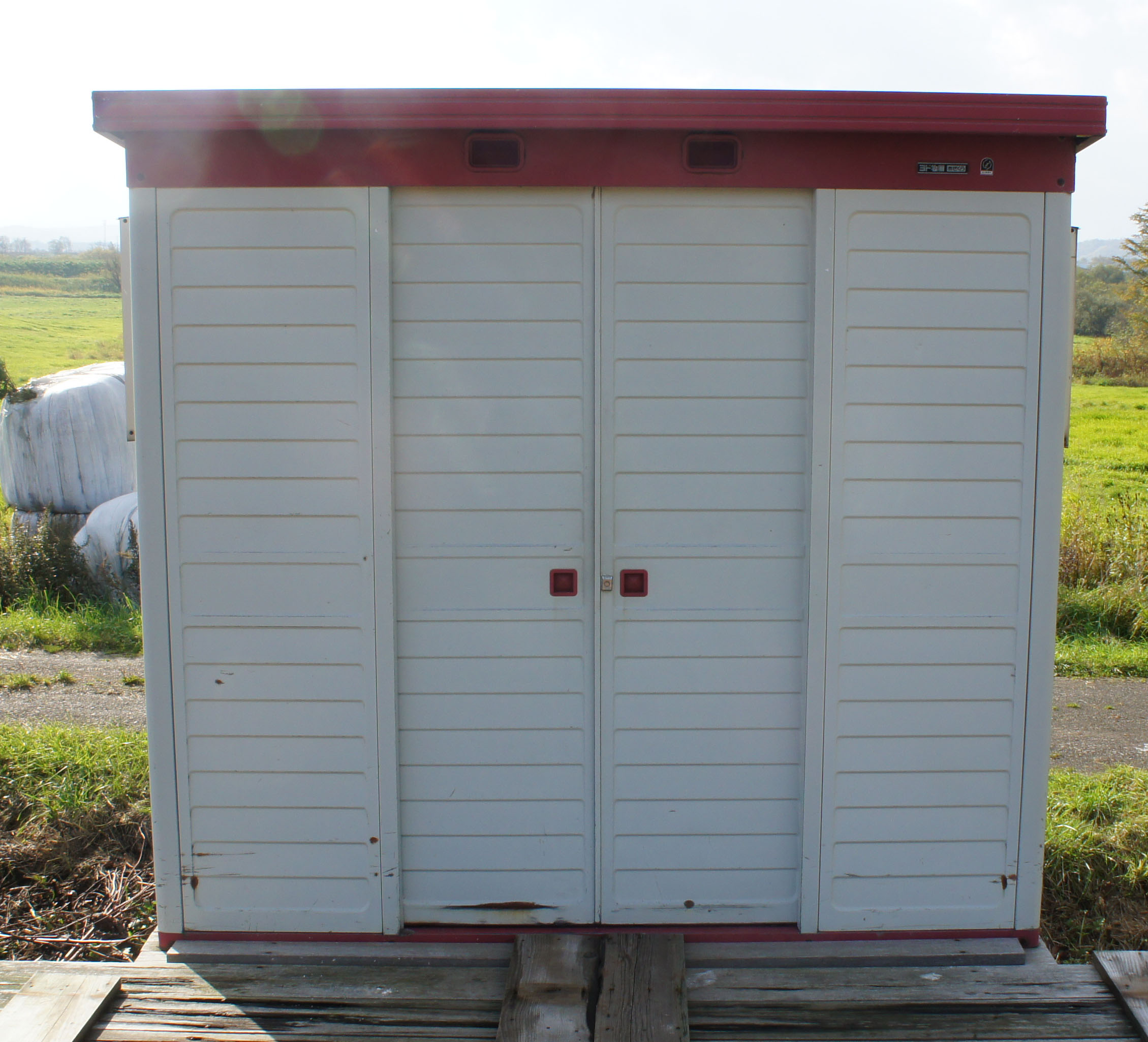
Waiting room

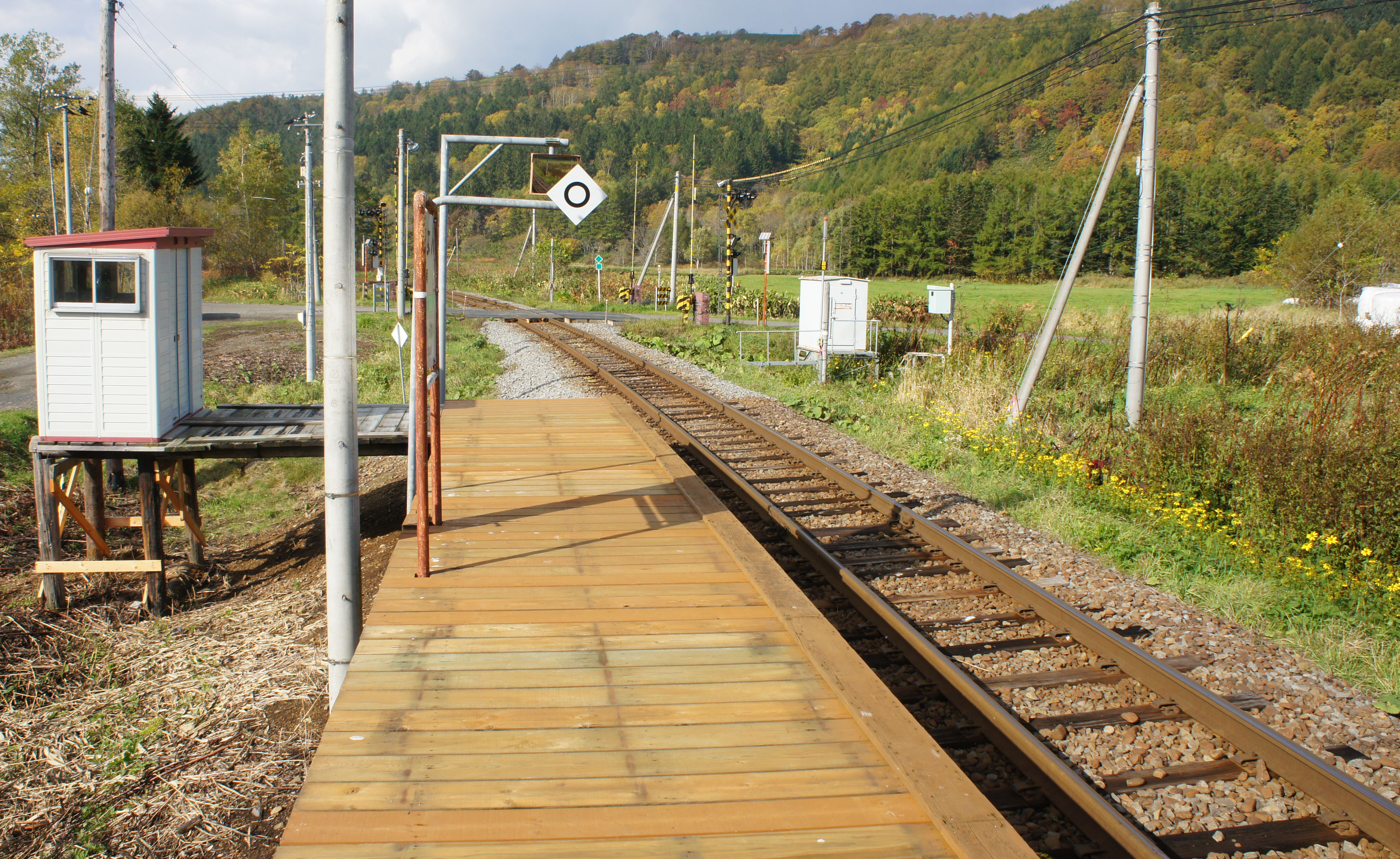
Platform

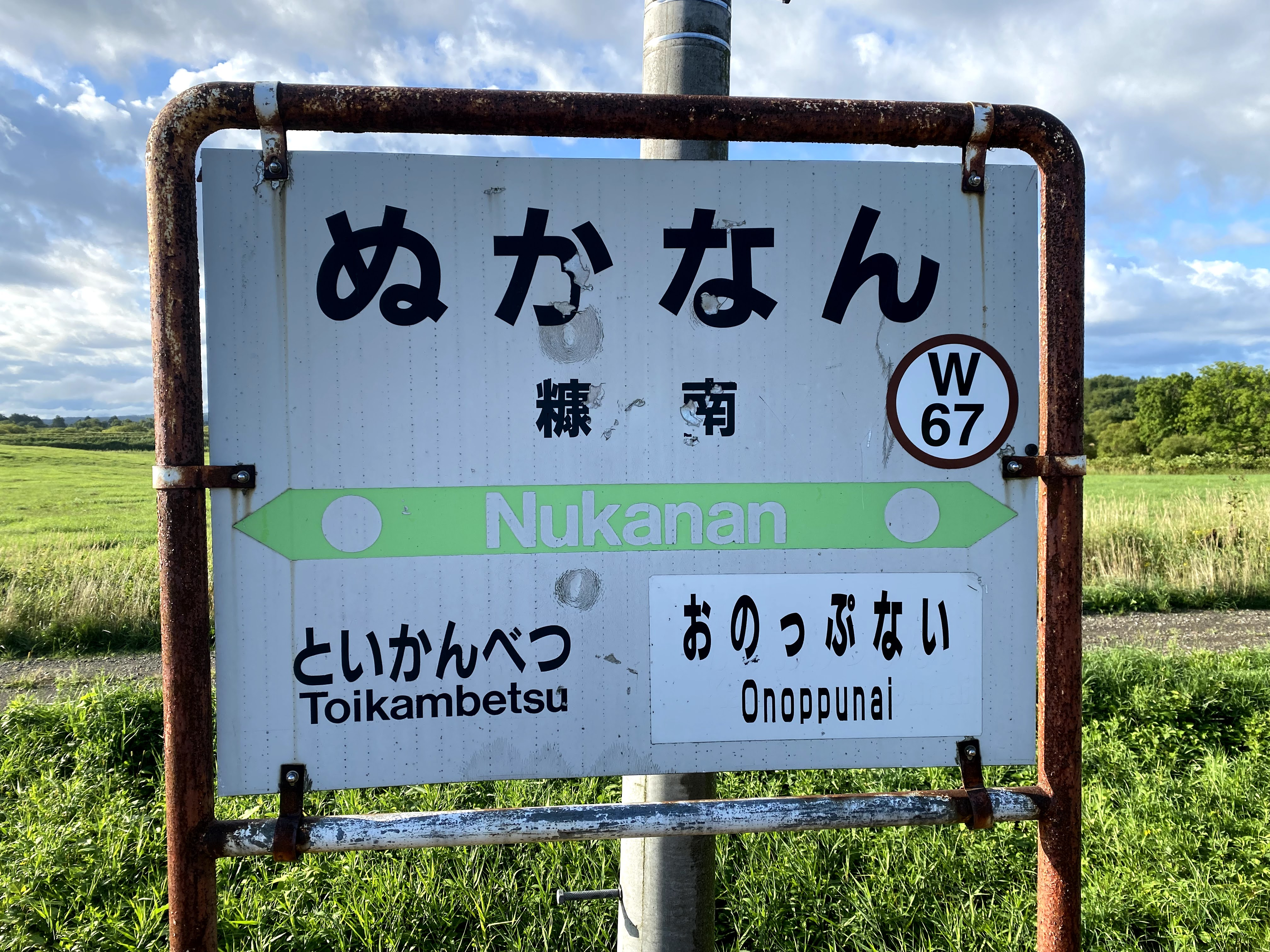
Signage

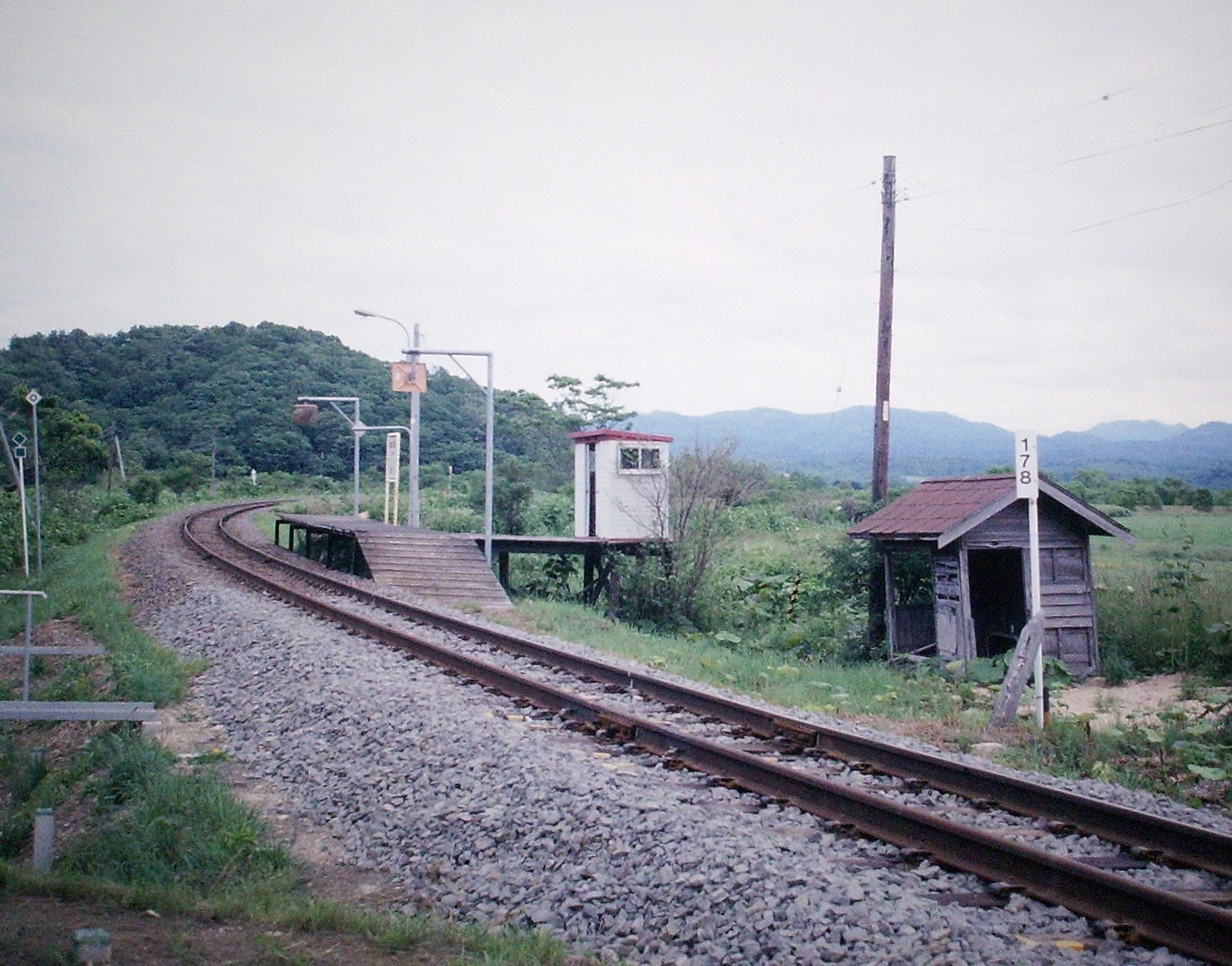
Panorama in 1978 shoring wooden station building

== History ==
The station opened on 2 December 1955. With the privatization of Japanese National Railways (JNR), the successor of JGR, on 1 April 1987, JR Hokkaido took over control of the station.

In September 2016, JR Hokkaido announced that it intended to close the station along with two other unstaffed stations on the line (Shimonuma and Minami-Horonobe) in March 2017, due to low passenger usage. This action was opposed by Horonobe Town, which announced that the town will take over maintenance and management of the station, with funding from hometown tax donations and other sources from fiscal year 2021.

== Passenger statistics ==
In fiscal 2015, the station was used on average by less than one passenger daily.

== Surrounding area ==
- Teshio River

== See also ==
- List of railway stations in Japan
