= Toikanbetsu Station =

Railway station in Horonobe, Hokkaido, Japan

W66 Toikanbetsu Station 問寒別駅
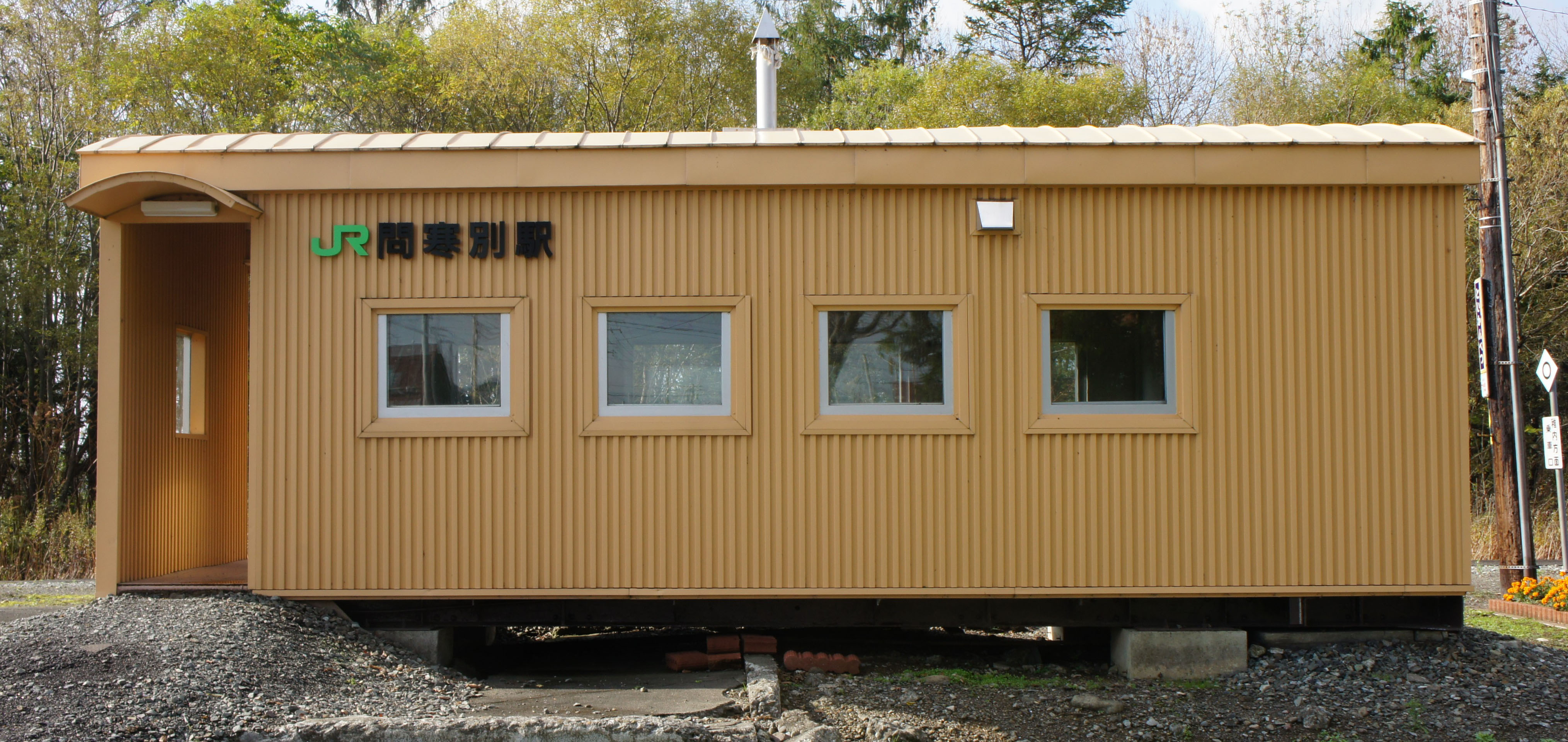
- Toikanbetsu Station in October 2017

General information
- Location: Toikanbetsu, Horonobe-cho, Teshio-gun, Hokkaido 098-2943; Japan
- Coordinates: 44°54′44.9″N 142°1′31.9″E
- System: regional rail
- Operator: JR Hokkaido
- Line: Sōya Main Line
- Distance: 175.8 km (109.2 mi) from Asahikawa
- Platforms: 1 side platform
- Tracks: 1

Construction
- Structure type: At grade

Other information
- Status: Unstaffed
- Station code: W66
- Website: Official website

History
- Opened: 10 November 1923

Passengers
- 2023: 2 daily

Services
Preceding station	JR Hokkaido	Following station
Nukanan towards Wakkanai	Sōya Main Line Local	Teshio-Nakagawa towards Asahikawa
Location
- Location within Hokkaido Location within Japan

Toikanbetsu Station (問寒別駅, Toikanbetsu-eki) is a railway station located in the town of Horonobe, Hokkaidō, Japan. It is operated by JR Hokkaido.

== Lines ==
The station is served by the Sōya Main Line and is located 175.8 km from the starting point of the line at Asahikawa. Only local trains stop at this station.

== Station layout ==
This is an above-ground station with one side platform and one track. The platform is located on the northeast side of the track (on the right hand side when facing Wakkanai). It is an unstaffed station managed by Horonobe Town. The station building is located on the northeast side of the premises, adjacent to the center of the platform. The station building is now a freight car station building, a Yo3500 series conductor's van. It stands on the foundations of the original station building..

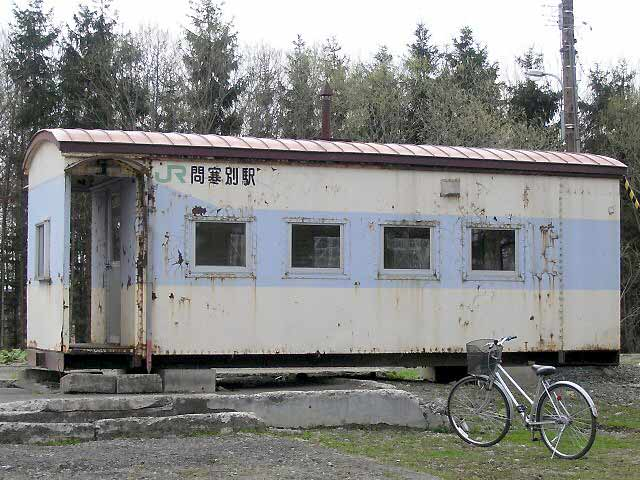
Station building in 2017

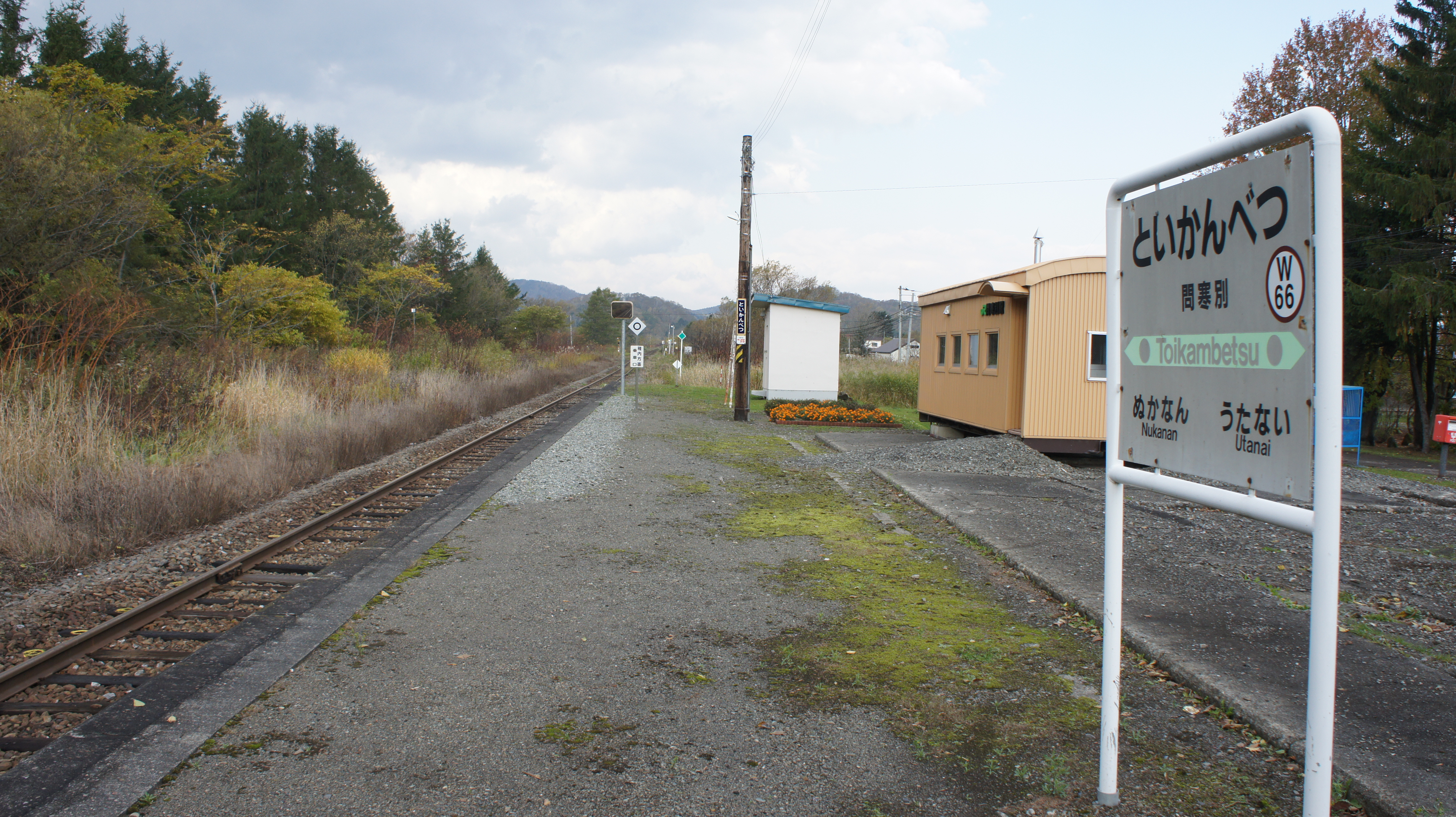
Platform

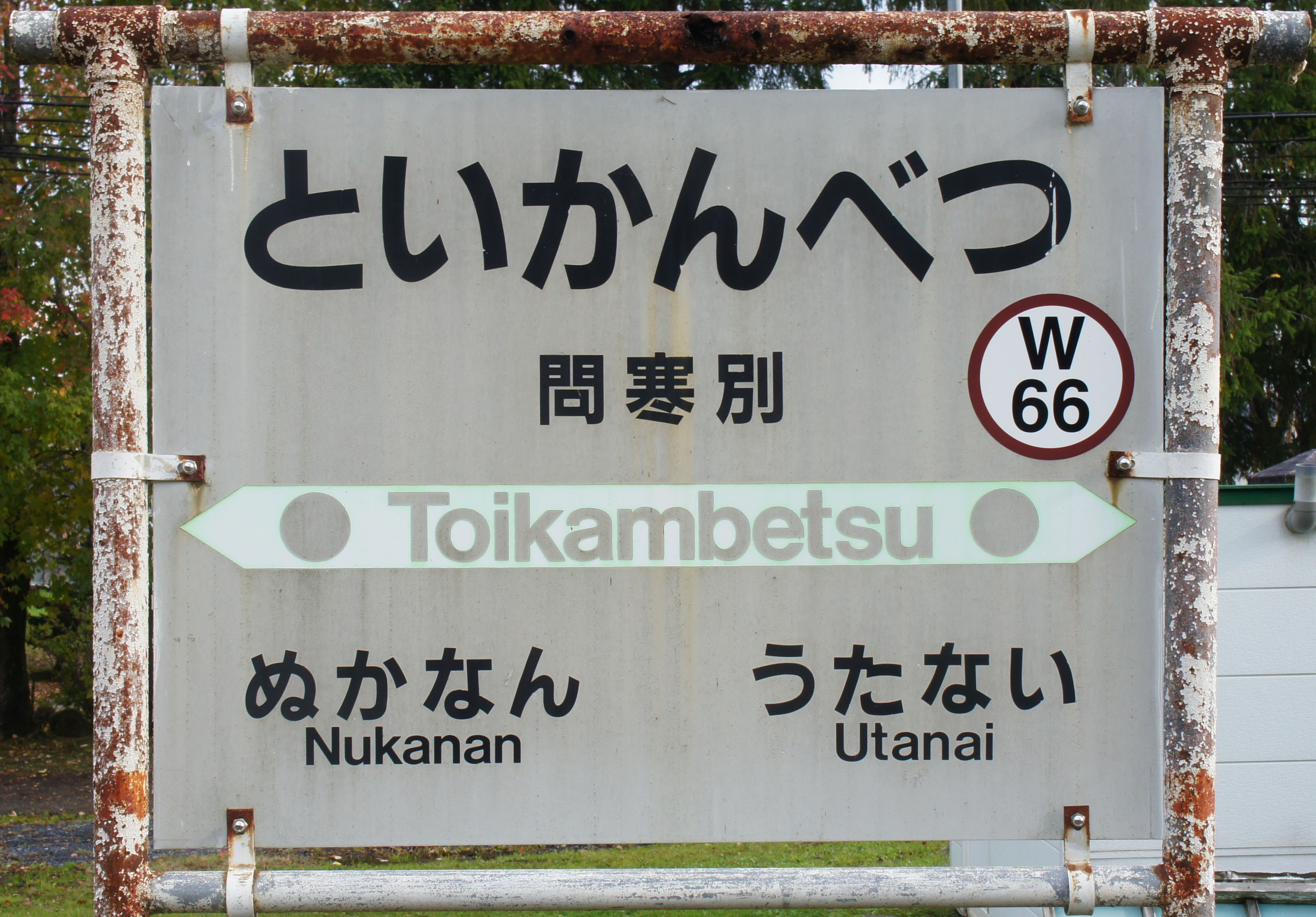
Signage

== History ==
The station opened on 10 November 1923 with the extension of the Ministry of Railways Teshio Line between Homare Station (now Teshio-Nakagawa Station) and this station the line was extended to Horonobe Station in 1925. The Teshio Line was incorporated into the Soya Main Line in 1930. With the privatization of Japanese National Railways (JNR), the successor of JGR, on 1 April 1987, JR Hokkaido took over control of the station.

In June 2023, this station was selected to be among 42 stations on the JR Hokkaido network to be slated for abolition owing to low ridership. This action was opposed by Horonobe Town, which announced that the town will take over maintenance and management of the station, with funding from hometown tax donations and other sources from fiscal year 2021.

== Passenger statistics ==
In fiscal 2023, the station was used on average by two passengers daily.

== Surrounding area ==
- Hokkaido Prefectural Highway 583
- Hokkaido Prefectural Highway 541
- Hokkaido Prefectural Highway 395

== See also ==
- List of railway stations in Japan
