= Horonobe, Hokkaido =

Horonobe 幌延町
- Town
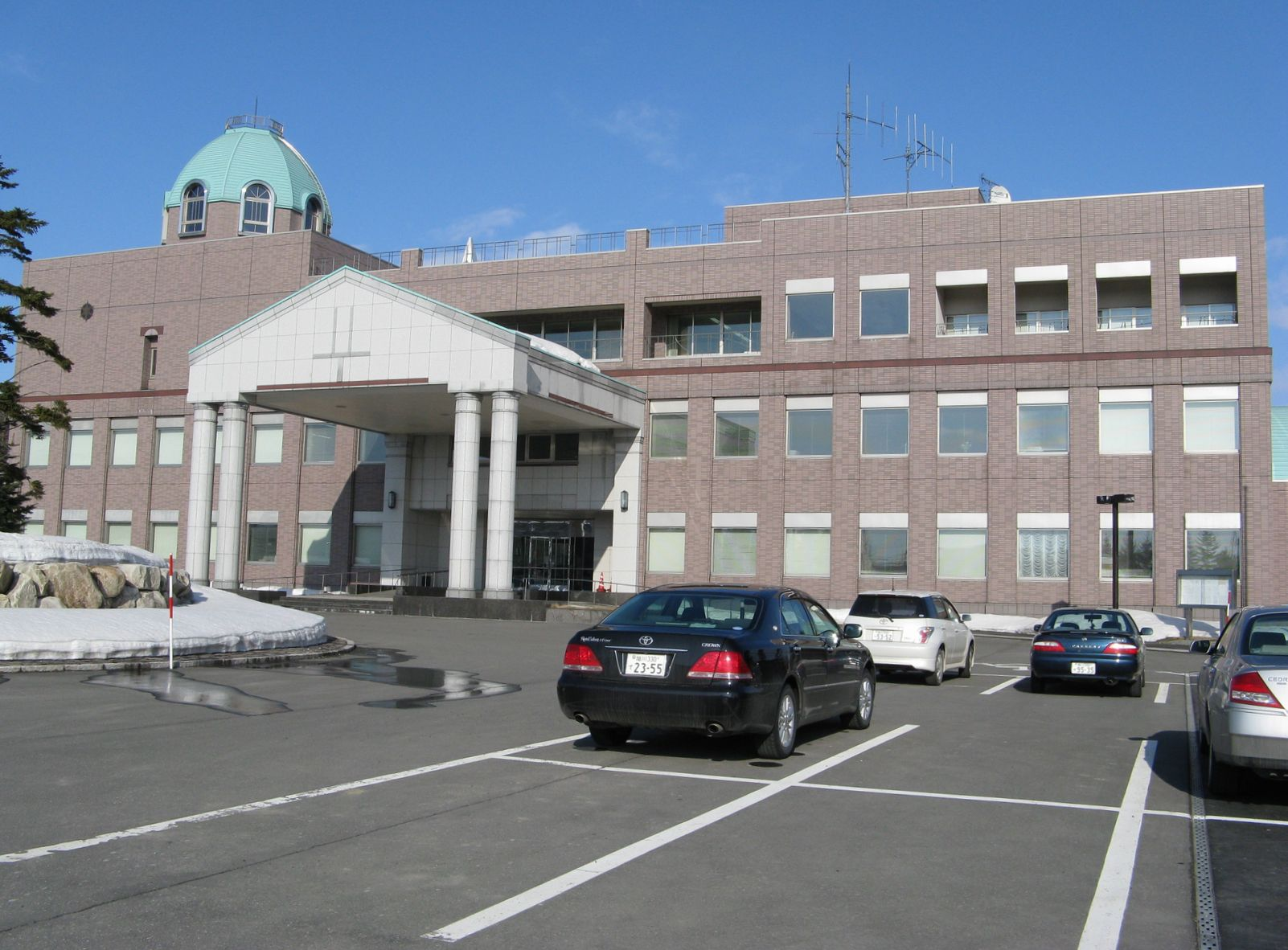
- Horonobe town hall

- Flag Emblem
- Interactive map of Horonobe
- Location in Japan
- Coordinates: 45°1′5″N 141°50′59″E
- Country: Japan
- Region: Hokkaido
- Prefecture: Hokkaido (Sōya Subprefecture)
- District: Teshio

Area
  - Total: 574.1 km^{2} (221.7 sq mi)

Population (January 31, 2025)
  - Total: 2,036
  - Density: 3.546/km^{2} (9.185/sq mi)
- Time zone: UTC+09:00 (JST)
- City hall address: 1-1 Miyazonocho, Horonobe-cho, Teshio-gun, Hokkaido 098-3207
- Climate: Dfb
- Website: Official website
- Symbols
- Flower: Sakura
- Tree: Sakhalin spruce

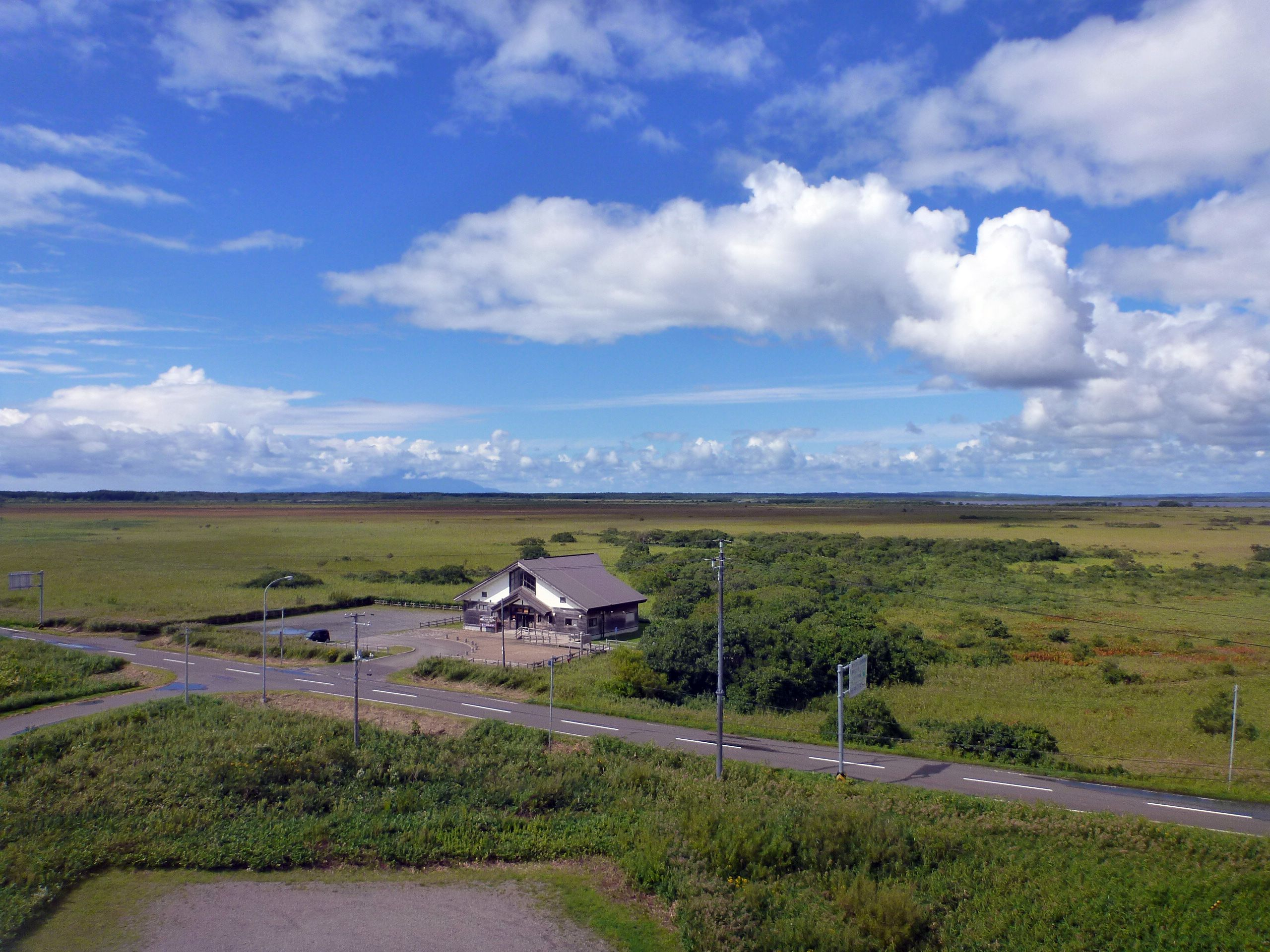
Horonobe Visitor Center

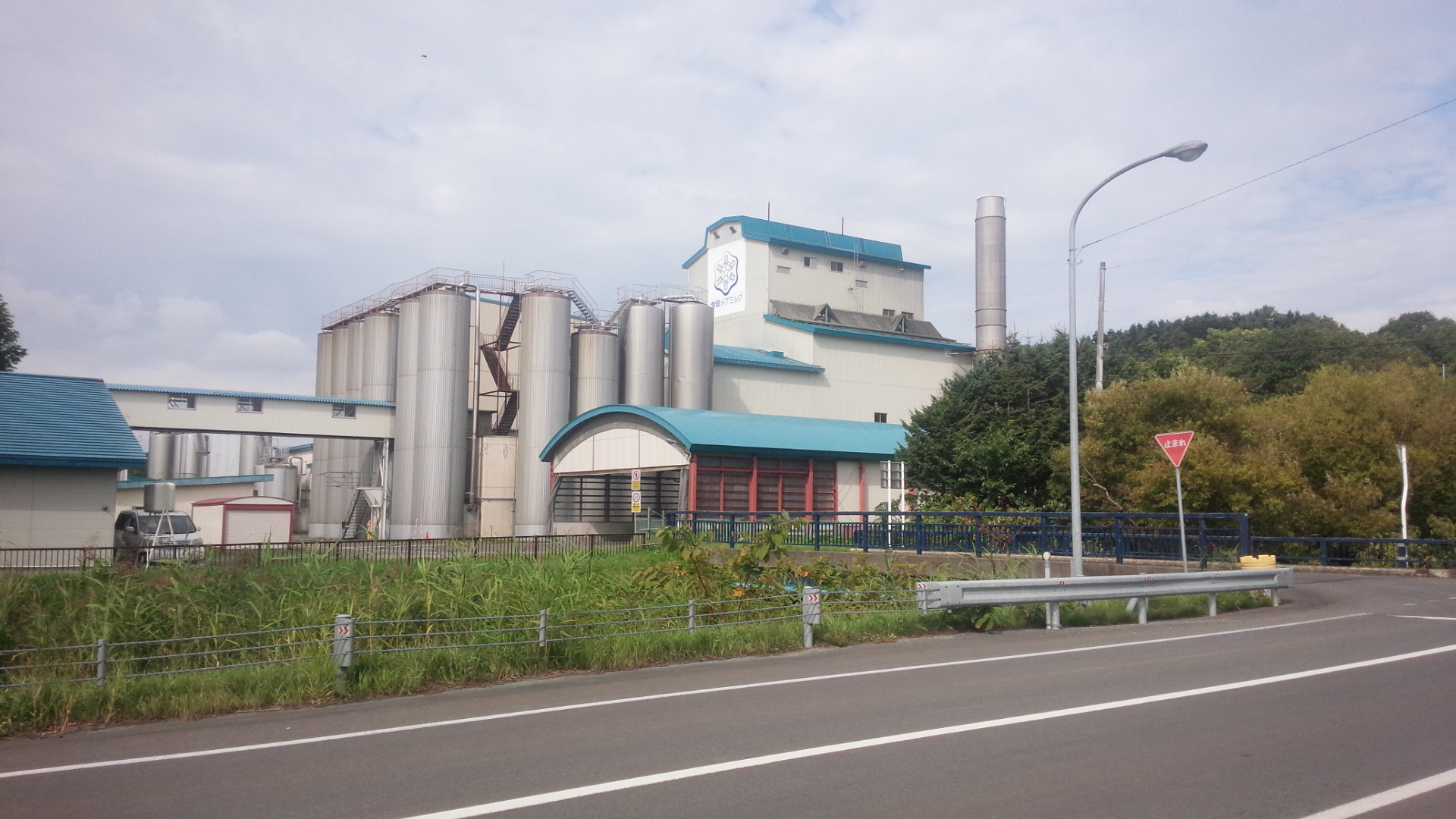
Milk factory in Horonobe

Horonobe-cho (幌延町, Horonobe-chō) is a town located in Sōya Subprefecture, Hokkaido, Japan. As of 31 January 2025, the town had an estimated population of 2,036 in 1,499 households, and a population density of 3.5 people per km^{2}. The total area of the town is 574.1 km^{2} (221.7 sq mi). The word "Horonobe" originates from Poro-Nup. In Ainu language, poro means large and nup mean grassland, thus meaning a large uncultivated land.

== Geography ==
Horonobe is located is located in the mid-west of the Soya region, on the Sea of Japan coast. The mouth of the Teshio River, Hokkaido's second longest river, is at the southwestern end of the town, and the river forms the town's border with neighboring Teshio Town to the southwest. Inland, there is the Sarobetsu Plain, a vast marshland that was once a lagoon that was turned into a sea by long-term sedimentation, and plains where the marshland has been turned into farmland and pastureland through land reclamation. Most of the eastern part, except for along the Monkanbetsu River, is mountainous and hilly forests, and much of this is the Teshio Research Forest of Hokkaido University.

The 45th parallel north crosses the town from east to west. Similarly, the 45th parallel north passes through the towns of Nakatonbetsu and Esashi. The 142nd meridian east also passes through the town, and these two lines intersect in the mountainous and hilly area in the eastern part of the town.

=== Neighbouring municipalities ===
- Hokkaido
  - Nakatonbtesu
  - Hamatonbetsu
  - Sarufutsu
  - Toyotomi
  - Teshio
  - Nakagawa

== Climate ==
Horonobe has a humid continental climate (Köppen Dfb) characterized by cold summers and cold winters with heavy snowfall. The average annual temperature in Horonobe is 6.3 °C. The average annual rainfall is 1069 mm with September as the wettest month. The temperatures are highest on average in August, at around 19.5 °C, and lowest in January, at around -7.4 °C.

Climate data for 幌Horonobe（2006 - 2020）
Month	Jan	Feb	Mar	Apr	May	Jun	Jul	Aug	Sep	Oct	Nov	Dec	Year
Average precipitation mm (inches)	38.4 (1.51)	26.4 (1.04)	33.4 (1.31)	39.5 (1.56)	59.5 (2.34)	62.7 (2.47)	108.9 (4.29)	129.5 (5.10)	132.4 (5.21)	113.0 (4.45)	99.0 (3.90)	64.1 (2.52)	892.1 (35.12)
Average precipitation days (≥ 1.0 mm)	13.0	10.0	8.9	7.4	9.4	9.0	8.3	9.8	12.1	13.9	14.4	15.3	130.3
Source 1: Japan Meteorological Agency
Source 2: 気象庁

=== Demographics ===
Per Japanese census data, the population of Horonobe is as shown below. The town is in a long period of sustained population loss.

Historical population
Year	Pop.	±%
1940	4,852	—
1950	5,881	+21.2%
1960	7,438	+26.5%
1970	5,073	−31.8%
1980	4,253	−16.2%
1990	3,327	−21.8%
2000	2,835	−14.8%
2010	2,672	−5.7%
2020	2,371	−11.3%

== History ==
During the Edo period, the area of Horonobe was part off the territory of the Matsumae Domain. The village of Horonobe was established in Teshio Province in 1878, but at that time was a village in name only, as there were no inhabitants. In 1899, 15 households from Fukui Prefecture joined the three households with 13 people who had settled in the area the previous year. The population grew to 1297 people in 292 households by 1909. Horonobe was raised to town status on September 1, 1960. In 2010, the town of Horonobe was transferred from Rumoi Subprefecture to Sōya Subprefecture.

== Government ==
Horonobe has a mayor-council form of government with a directly elected mayor and a unicameral town council of eight members. Horonobe, as part of Soya sub-prefecture, contributes one member to the Hokkaidō Prefectural Assembly. In terms of national politics, the town is part of the Hokkaidō 10th district of the lower house of the Diet of Japan.

== Economy ==
The main industries of Horonobe are dairy farming and reindeer ranching. Historically, field farming was centered on potato cultivation, which had unstable harvests due to climate change, but the town gradually shifted to pasture and dairy farming. The town is home to the Horonobe Factory of Snow Brand Megmilk Co., Ltd. (formerly Snow Brand Milk Products Co., Ltd.), which processes and manufactures butter and skim milk powder using raw milk produced in various parts of northern Hokkaido. Other than this, many people work in construction, transportation, retail, food and beverage, and service industries. Forestry was also historically a major industry, but due to reduced demand caused by an increase in low-cost imported timber, the industry is now moribund. Reindeer ranching started in 1989, and is now a tourist attraction.

In October 2000, with the help of local government and NEDO, the Horonobe wind power generation project came into existence. Wind turbines were installed on trial-run basis along the 3.1 km coastline. Since February 2003, there are 28 turbines working in full capacity, with an individual output of 750 kW. In total its estimated that the wind turbines in Horonobe-chō generate 50 gigawatt-hours of electricity annually, and this is supplied to Hokkaido Electric Power Company for distribution. This electricity is equivalent to annual electric consumption of about 10,000 Japanese households.

Since 1998, the Japan Atomic Energy Agency started planning an underground research laboratory at Honorobe to be able to conduct tests on the suitability of sedimentary rock for use as a deep geological repository for Japan's spent nuclear fuel (a similar research facility in crystalline rock is also being constructed at Mizunami in Gifu Prefecture). Excavation began in 2003, and is scheduled for completion in 2017. A possibility of making a geological carbon capture and storage (CCS) site is also under consideration at Honorobe.

== Education ==
Horonobe has one public elementary school and one public junior high school operated by the town government, and one public high school operated by the Hokkaidō Board of Education.

== Transportation ==
=== Railways ===
JR Hokkaido - Sōya Main Line

■ Toikanbetsu - Nukanan - Onoppunai - Horonobe - Shimonuma

=== Highways ===
- National Route 40
- National Route 232

== Local attractions ==
- Rishiri-Rebun-Sarobetsu National Park

== Horonobe in the media or popular culture ==
Some speciality microbes have been discovered in the subsurface environment. These are listed below:

- Methanosarcina horonobensis
- Methanoculleus horonobensis
- Methanoculleus horonobensis genome sequences analysis.

== Mascots ==
Horobe and Blupy, the town's mascots

Horonobe's mascots are Horobe (ホロベー) and Blupy (ブルピー, Burupī).

- Horobe is a gentle and kind reindeer. He works at the local reindeer ranch. He is unveiled in 1997.
- Blupy is a gentle and fluffy blue poppy that can fly. She is unveiled in 2011.
