= W59 (disambiguation) =

The W59 was an American thermonuclear warhead.

W59 may also refer to:

- W59 (New Jersey bus)
- Teshiogawa-Onsen Station
- W59, a Toyota W transmission
