= Bifuka Station =

Railway station in Bifuka, Hokkaido, Japan

W54 Bifuka Station 美深駅
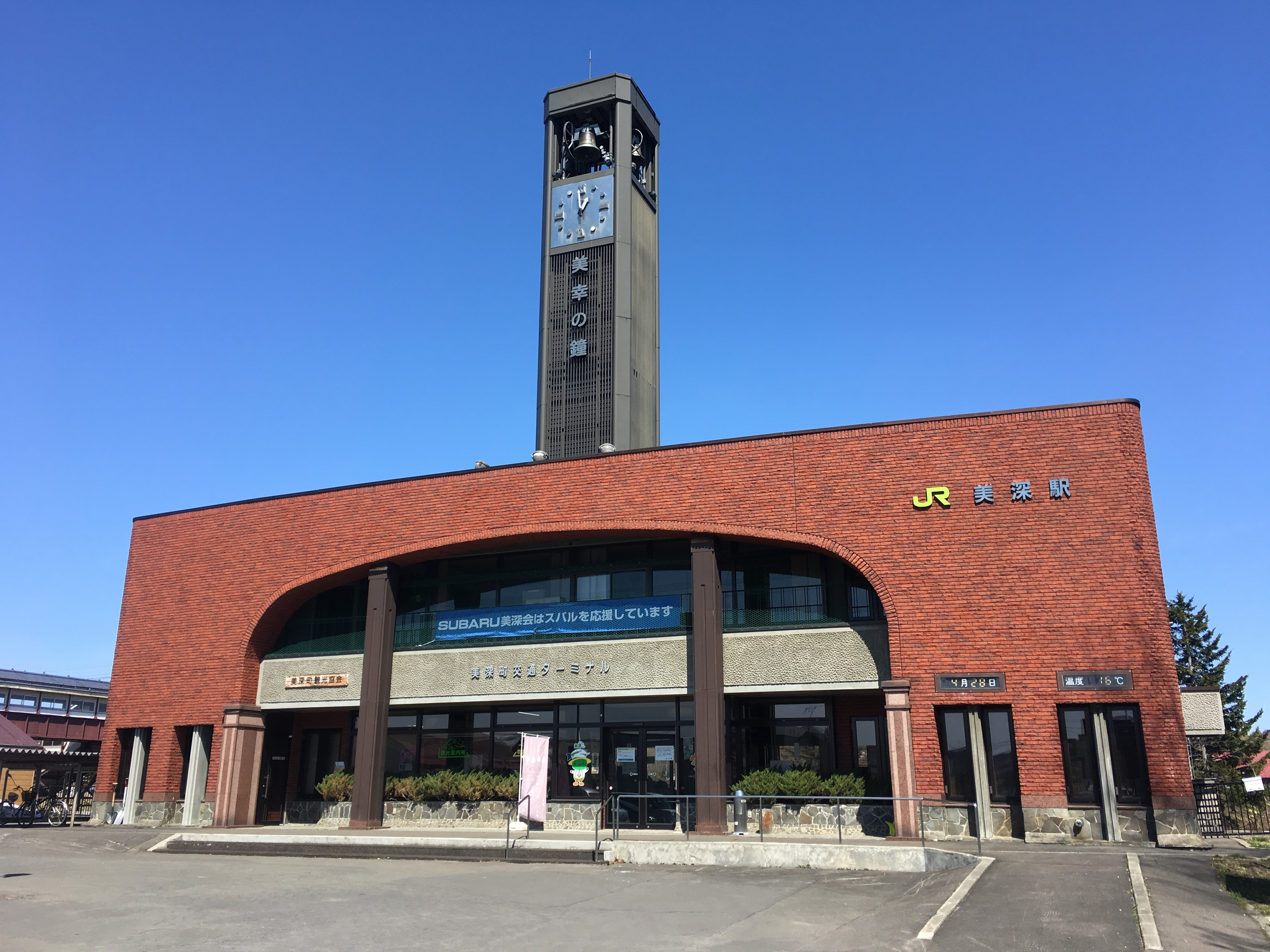
- Bifuka Station, April 2019

General information
- Location: Kaiuncho, Bifuka-cho, Nakagawa-gun, Hokkaido 098-2238; Japan
- Coordinates: 44°28′59.82″N 142°21′1.03″E
- System: regional rail
- Operator: JR Hokkaido
- Line: Sōya Main Line
- Distance: 98.3 km (61.1 mi) from Asahikawa
- Platforms: 2 side platforms
- Train operators: JR Hokkaido

Construction
- Structure type: At grade

Other information
- Status: Staffed
- Station code: W54
- Website: Official website

History
- Opened: 3 November 1911

Passengers
- FY2022: 35

Services
Preceding station	JR Hokkaido	Following station
Teshiogawa-Onsen towards Wakkanai	Sōya Main Line Local	Chihoku towards Asahikawa
Otoineppu towards Wakkanai	Sōya Main Line Limited Express Soya / Sarobetsu	Nayoro towards Asahikawa
Location
- Location within Hokkaido Location within Japan

Bifuka Station (美深駅, Bifuka-eki) is a railway station located in the town of Bifuka, Nakagawa District (Teshio), Hokkaidō, Japan. It is operated by JR Hokkaido.

== Lines ==
The station is served by the 259.4 km (161.2 mi) Soya Main Line from Asahikawa to Wakkanai and is located 98.3 km from the starting point of the line at Asahikawa.

== Layout ==
Bifuka Station has two side platforms and two tracks. A footbridge is used to move between the platforms. The station is staffed. The station building is called the "Bifuka Town Transportation Terminal" and houses a shop and a tourist information center. The station has a bell tower commemorating the discontinued Miyuki Line, and is rung when the Wakkanai-bound "Sōya" express train arrives at 3 p.m. daily.

=== Platforms ===
1	■ Sōya Main Line	for Otoineppu and Wakkanai
2	■ Sōya Main Line	for Asahikawa

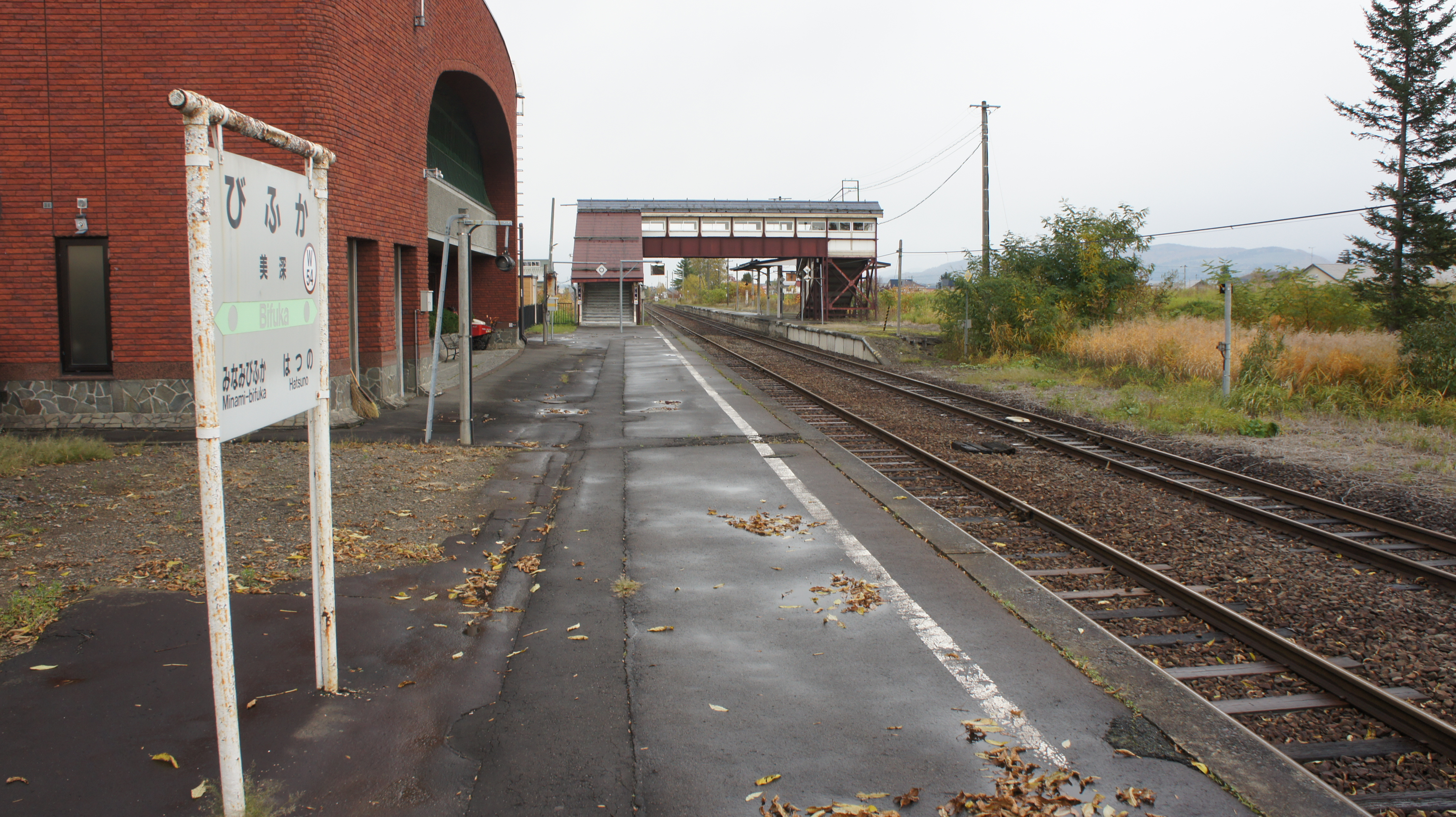
Platform

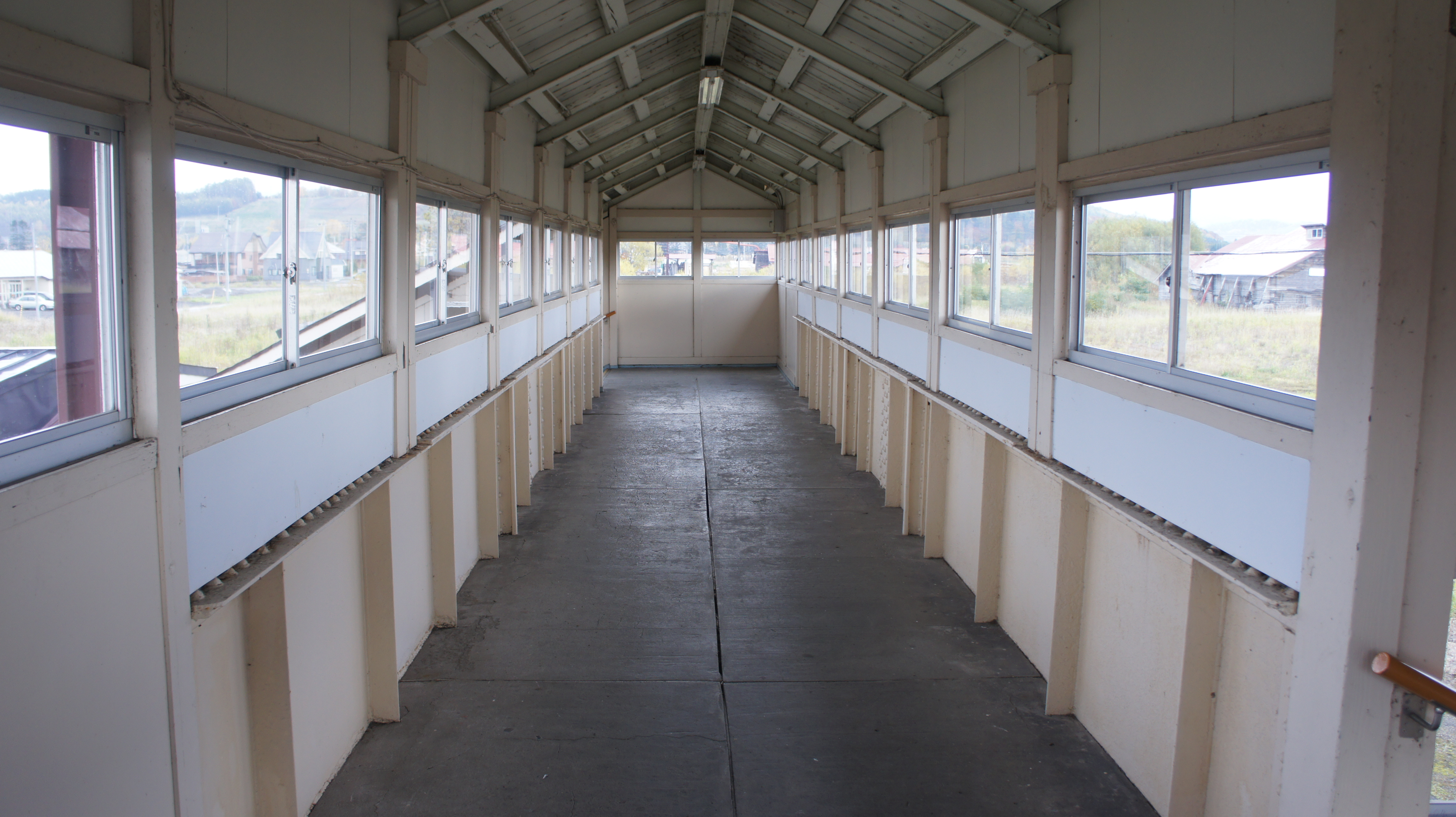
Footbridge

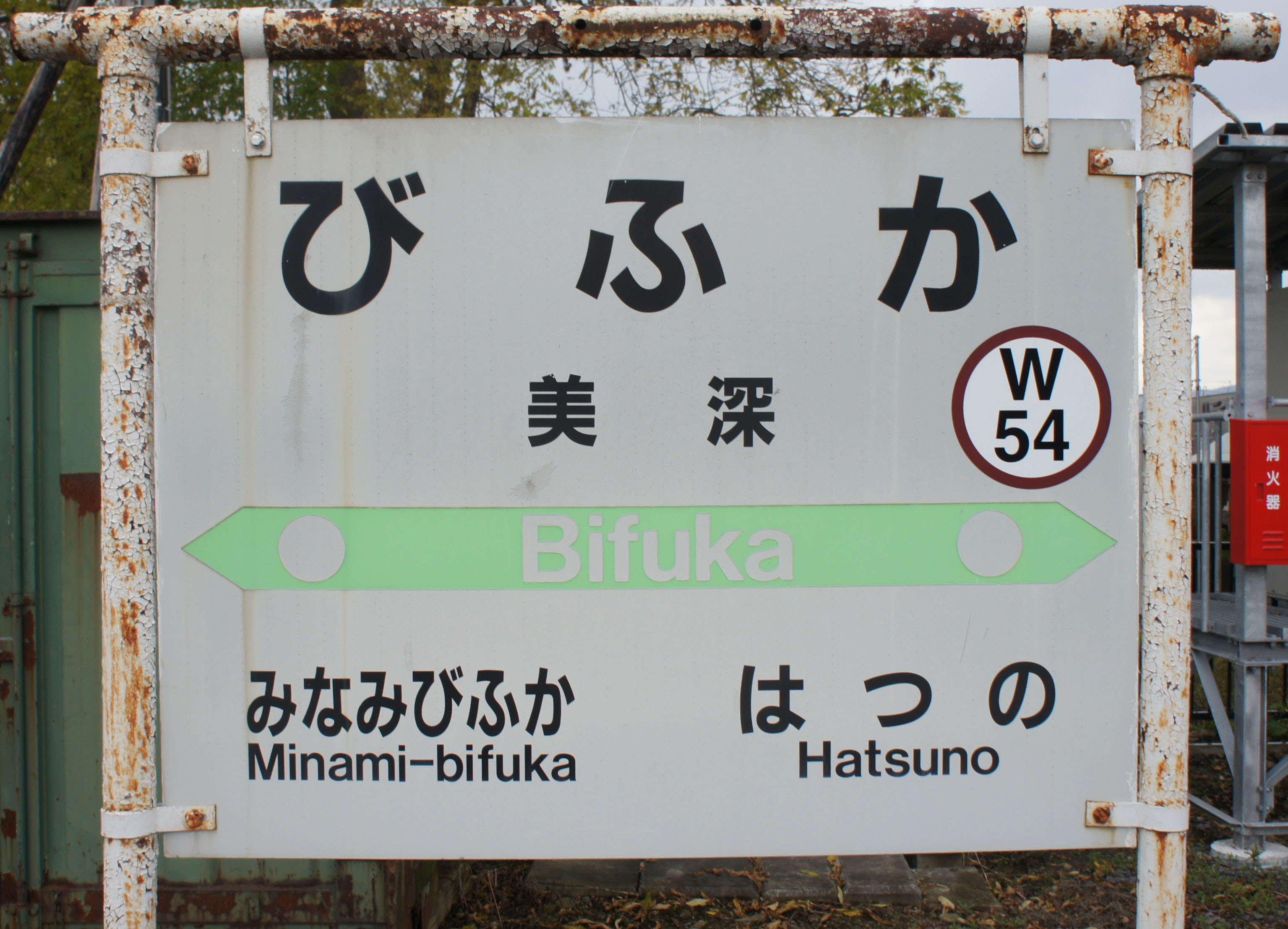
Signage

== History ==
Nifuka Station opened on 3 November 1911; however, its name was originally pronounced "Piuka". The name was changed to "Bifuka" on 14 July 1951. The JNR Miyuki Line operated from this station from 5 October 1964 to 17 September 1985. With the privatization of Japanese National Railways (JNR) on 1 April 1987, the station came under the control of JR Hokkaido. The station building was rebuilt the same year.

== Passenger statistics ==
During fiscal 2022, the station was used on average by 35 passengers daily.

== Surrounding area ==
- Japan National Route 40
- Bifuka Town Hall
- Hokkaido Bifuka High School

== See also ==
- List of railway stations in Japan
