= Chihoku Station =

Railway station in Nayoro, Hokkaido, Japan

W52 Chihoku Station 智北駅
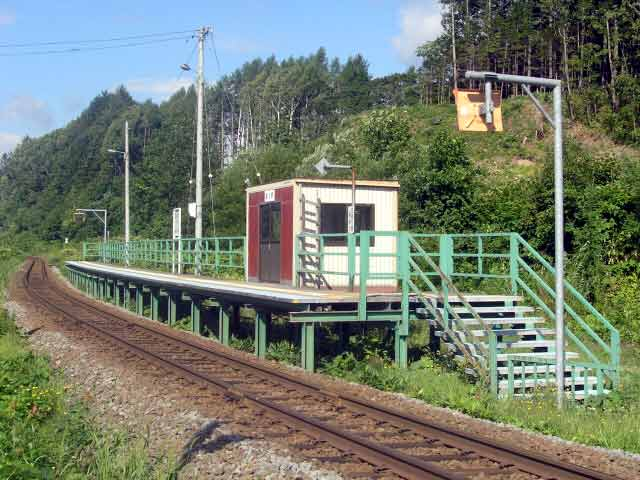
- Chihoku Station

General information
- Location: Chiebun, Nayoro-shi, Hokkaido 098-2181; Japan
- Coordinates: 44°27′40.8″N 142°23′43.3″E
- System: regional rail
- Operator: JR Hokkaido
- Line: Sōya Main Line
- Distance: 93.3 km (58.0 mi) from Asahikawa
- Platforms: 1 side platform
- Train operators: JR Hokkaido

Construction
- Structure type: At grade

Other information
- Status: Unattended
- Station code: W52
- Website: Official website

History
- Opened: 1 November 1959

Passengers
- FY2022: 2

Services
Preceding station	JR Hokkaido	Following station
Bifuka towards Wakkanai	Sōya Main Line Local	Chiebun towards Asahikawa
Location
- Location within Hokkaido Location within Japan

Chihoku Station (智北駅, Chihoku-eki) is a railway station located in the city of Nayoro, Hokkaidō, Japan. It is operated by JR Hokkaido.

== Lines ==
The station is served by the 259.4 km (161.2 mi) Soya Main Line from Asahikawa to Wakkanai and is located 93.3 km from the starting point of the line at Asahikawa.

== Layout ==
The station above-ground station with one side platform on the right hand side of the single track when facing towards Wakkanai. The station is unattended.

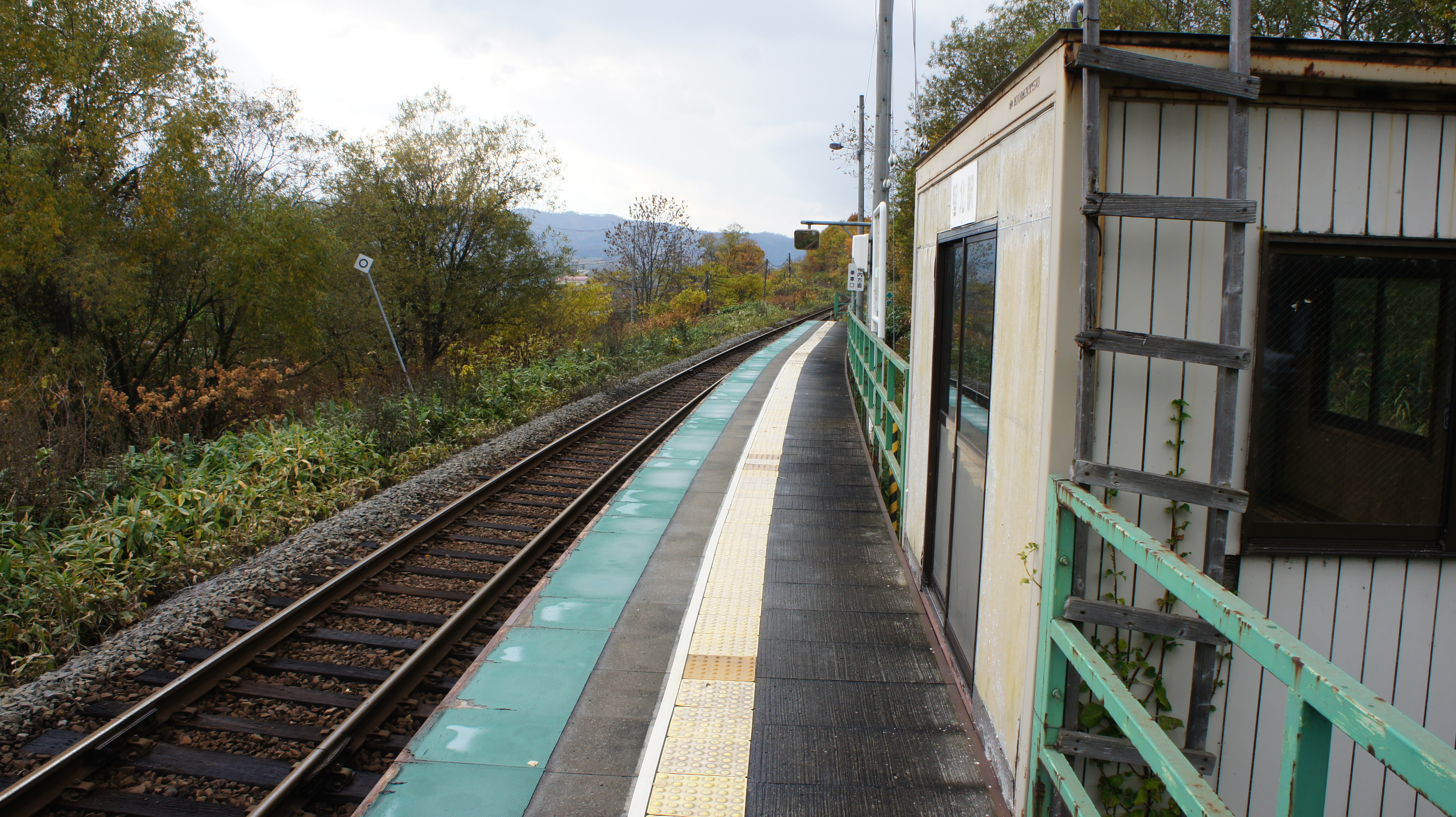
Platform

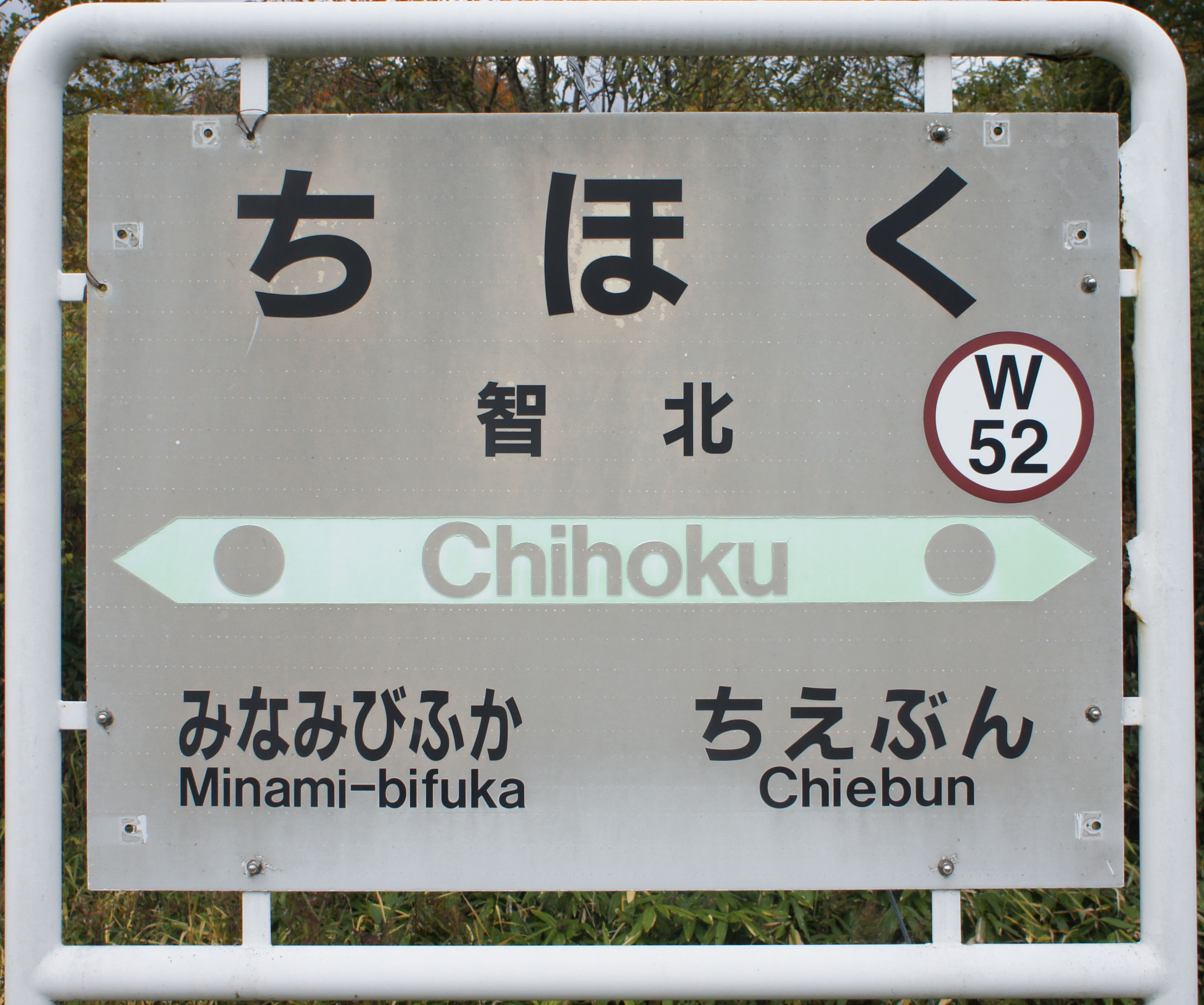
Signage

== History ==
The station was opened on 1 November 1959 as the Chihoku Temporary Station on the Japanese National Railways, at the request of local residents and the city to develop tourism at the nearby Chiebun Marsh.With the privatization of Japanese National Railways (JNR) on 1 April 1987, the station came under the control of JR Hokkaido and was upgraded to a full station on 1 November 1991, due to the widening and improvement of Hokkaido Highway 252, the station was moved 120 meters closer to Chiebun Station. On 9 December 2020: JR Hokkaido announced that it would transfer maintenance management to the local government (Nayoro City) from fiscal year 2021. In June 2023, this station was selected to be among 42 stations on the JR Hokkaido network to be slated for abolition.

== Passenger statistics ==
During fiscal 2022, the station was used on average by 2 passengers daily.

== Surrounding area ==
- Chiebun Marsh
- Teshio River

== See also ==
- List of railway stations in Japan
