= Sakkuru Station =

Railway station in Otoineppu, Hokkaido, Japan

W60 Sakkuru Station 咲来駅
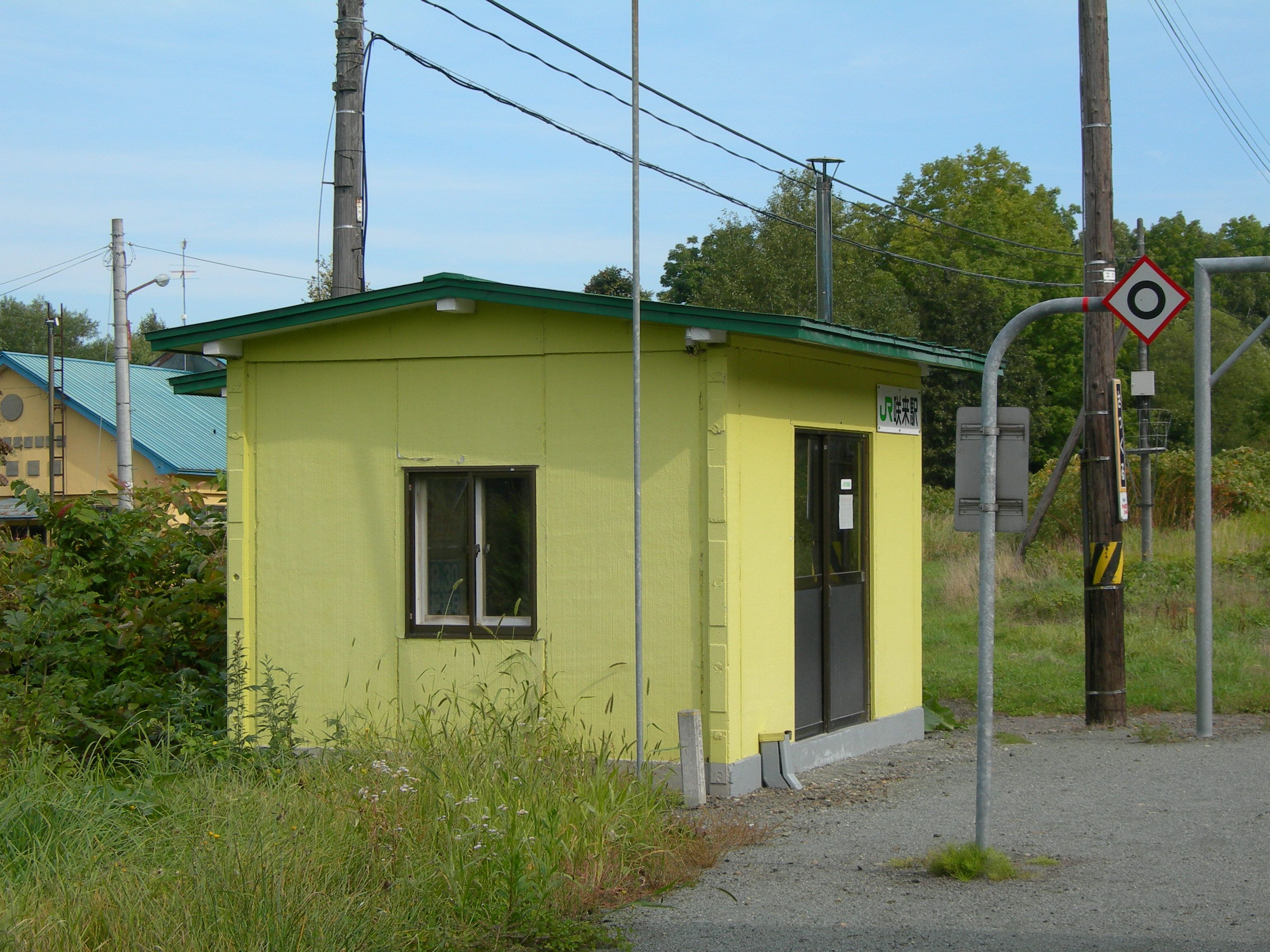
- Sakkuru Station, September 2009

General information
- Location: Sakkuru, Otoineppu-mura, Nakagawa-gun, Hokkaido 098-2502; Japan
- Coordinates: 44°41′34″N 142°16′3″E
- System: regional rail
- Operator: JR Hokkaido
- Line: Sōya Main Line
- Distance: 124.7 km (77.5 mi) from Asahikawa
- Platforms: 1 side platform
- Train operators: JR Hokkaido

Construction
- Structure type: At grade

Other information
- Status: Unattended
- Station code: W60
- Website: Official website

History
- Opened: 5 November 1912

Passengers
- FY2022: <2

Services
Preceding station	JR Hokkaido	Following station
Otoineppu towards Wakkanai	Sōya Main Line Local	Teshiogawa-Onsen towards Asahikawa
Location
- Location within Hokkaido Location within Japan

Sakkuru Station (咲来駅, Sakkuru-eki) is a railway station located in the village of Otoineppu, Nakagawa District (Teshio), Hokkaidō, Japan. It is operated by JR Hokkaido.

== Lines ==
The station is served by the 259.4 km (161.2 mi) Soya Main Line from Asahikawa to Wakkanai and is located 124.7 km from the starting point of the line at Asahikawa.

== Layout ==
Like the surrounding stations, when forestry was once thriving, the station flourished as a shipping station for timber cut from the surrounding forests and those along the Sakuraitoge Pass. Facing Wakkanai, the station had a wooden station building on the left, a baggage loading and unloading area on the Wakkanai side next to it, and a freight loading and unloading area on the opposite side of the station building. It was a general station with two staggered single platforms and two tracks centered on the station building, a siding from the Wakkanai side to the baggage loading and unloading area, and a secondary track for freight loading and unloading on the outside. Later, with the cessation of baggage and freight handling, the freight line was removed and the station was unattended, the platform on the station building side was converted to a single track, the old station building was removed, and a waiting room was installed, leaving the station with one side platform.

Panoramic view in 2004

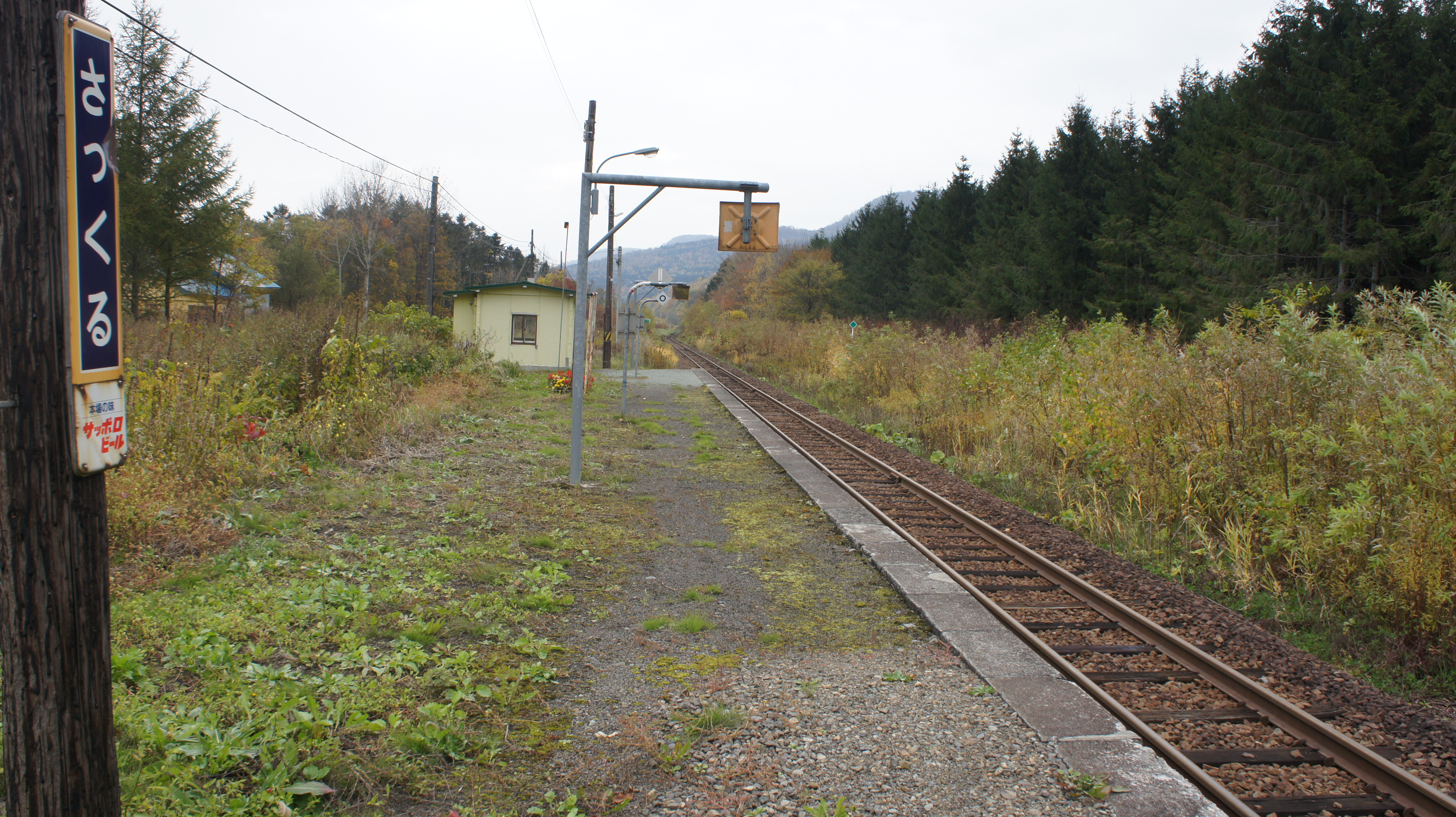
Platform

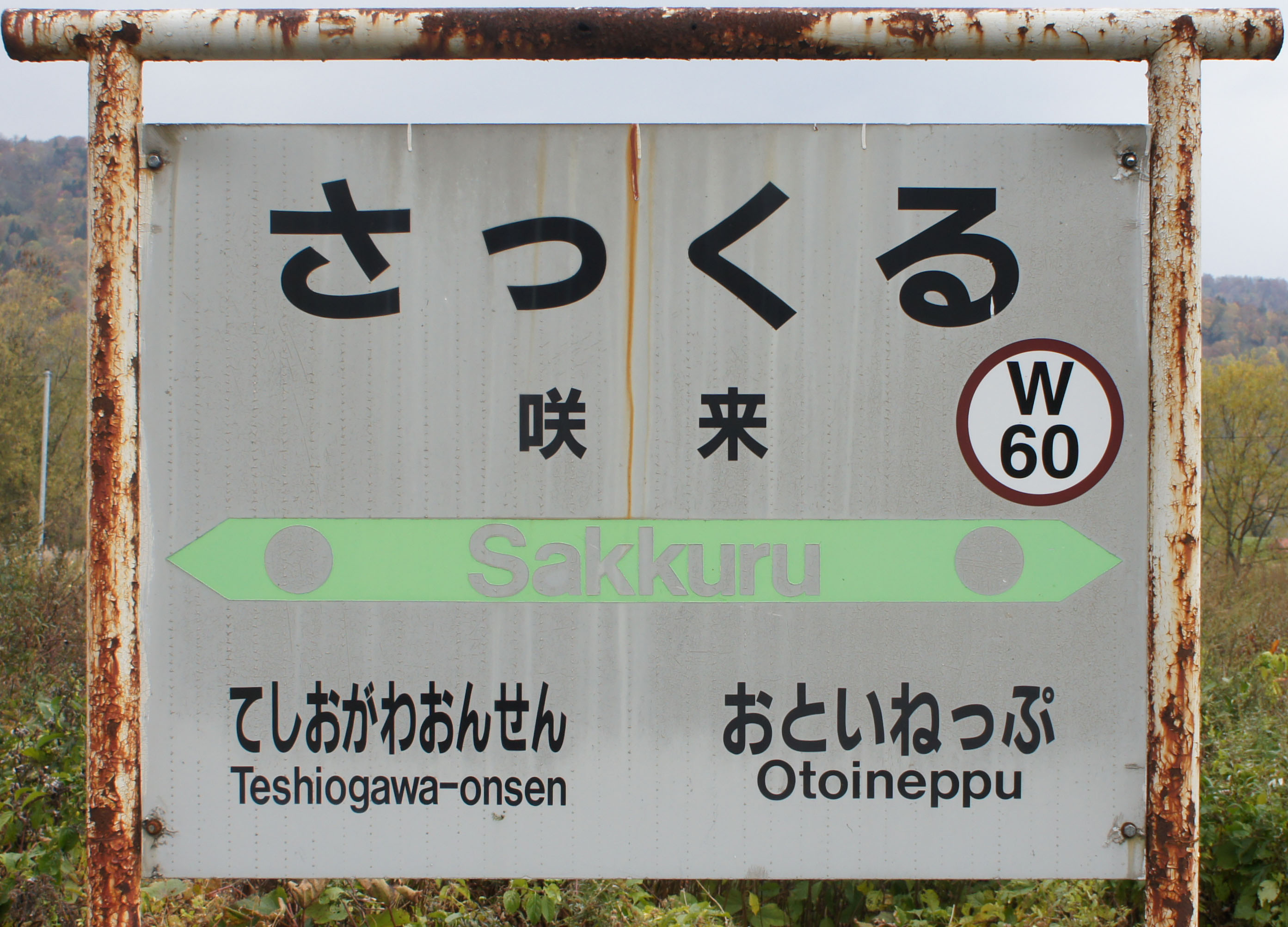
Signage

== History ==
Sakkuru Station opened on 5 November 1912. The station building was replaced by a remodeled freight car in July1985. With the privatization of Japanese National Railways (JNR) on 1 April 1987, the station came under the control of JR Hokkaido.

In July 2016, JR Hokkaido informed the local government of its intention to close the station from the start of the revised timetable in March 2017 due to low patronage. However, in April 2017, it was announced that JR Hokkaido would continue to maintain the station for the time being. In June 2023, this station was selected to be among 42 stations on the JR Hokkaido network to be slated for abolition owing to low ridership. In December 2020, JR Hokkaido announced that maintenance of the station would be transferred to tOtoineppu Village from fiscal year 2021.

== Passenger statistics ==
During the period between fiscal 2011 and 2015, the station was used on average by less than one passenger daily.

== Surrounding area ==
- Japan National Route 40
- Teshio River

== See also ==
- List of railway stations in Japan
