= Teshiogawa-Onsen Station =

Railway station in Otoineppu, Hokkaido, Japan

W59 Teshiogawa-Onsen Station 天塩川温泉駅
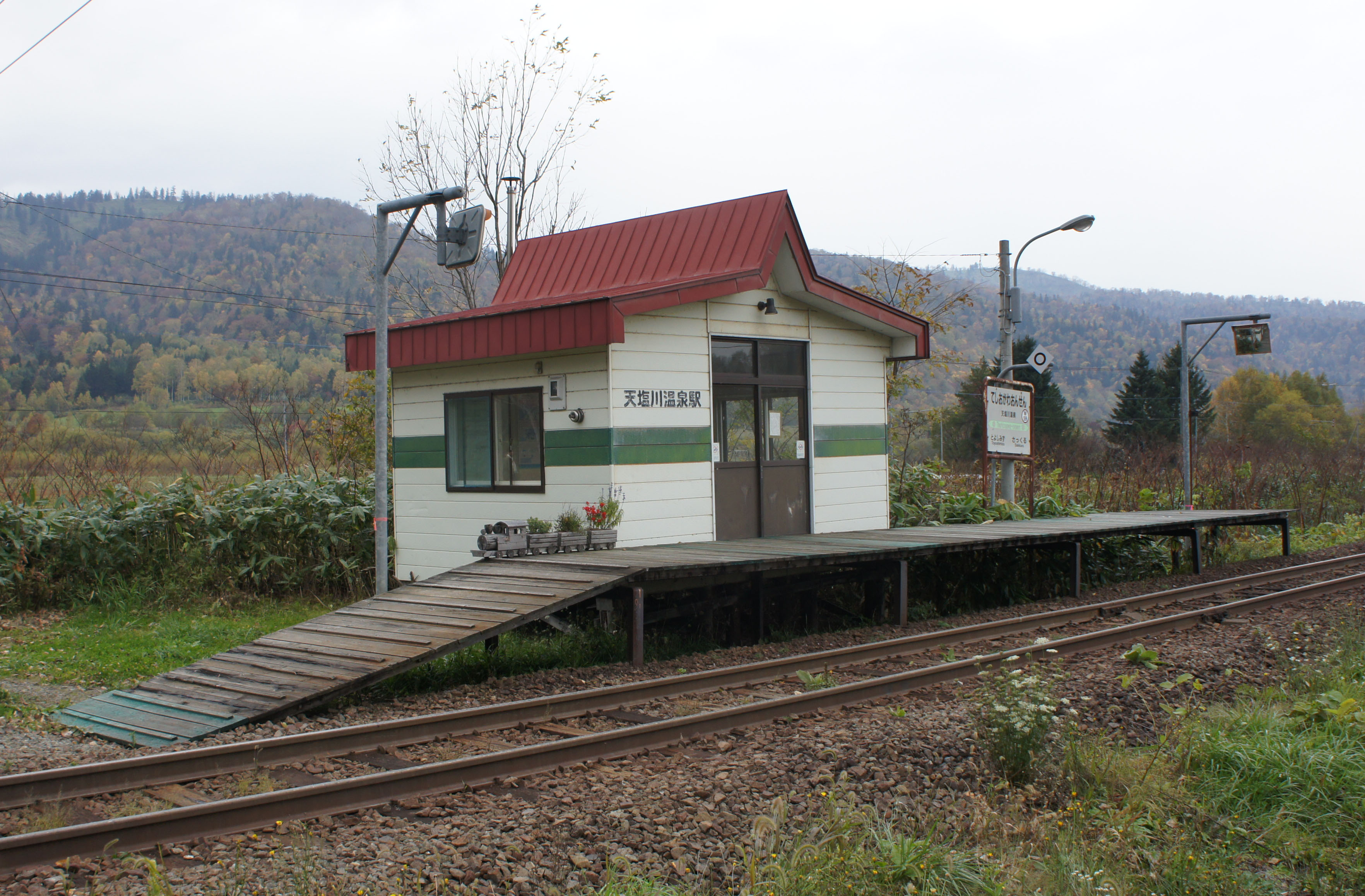
- Teshiogawa-Onsen Station, October 2017

General information
- Location: Sakkuru, Otoineppu-mura, Nakagawa-gun, Hokkaido 098-2502; Japan
- Coordinates: 44°39′53.5″N 142°15′30.8″E
- System: regional rail
- Operator: JR Hokkaido
- Line: Sōya Main Line
- Distance: 121.5 km (75.5 mi) from Asahikawa
- Platforms: 1 side platform
- Train operators: JR Hokkaido

Construction
- Structure type: At grade

Other information
- Status: Unattended
- Station code: W59
- Website: Official website

History
- Opened: 1 April 1987

Passengers
- FY2022: <1

Services
Preceding station	JR Hokkaido	Following station
Sakkuru towards Wakkanai	Sōya Main Line Local	Bifuka towards Asahikawa
Location
- Location within Hokkaido Location within Japan

Teshiogawa-Onsen Station (天塩川温泉駅, Teshiogawa-onsen-eki) is a railway station located in the village of Otoineppu, Nakagawa District (Teshio), Hokkaidō, Japan. It is operated by JR Hokkaido.

== Lines ==
The station is served by the 259.4 km (161.2 mi) Soya Main Line from Asahikawa to Wakkanai and is located 121.5 km from the starting point of the line at Asahikawa.

== Layout ==
Teshiogawa-Onsen Station is an above-ground station with one side platform and one track. It is an unattended station managed by Otoineppu Village.

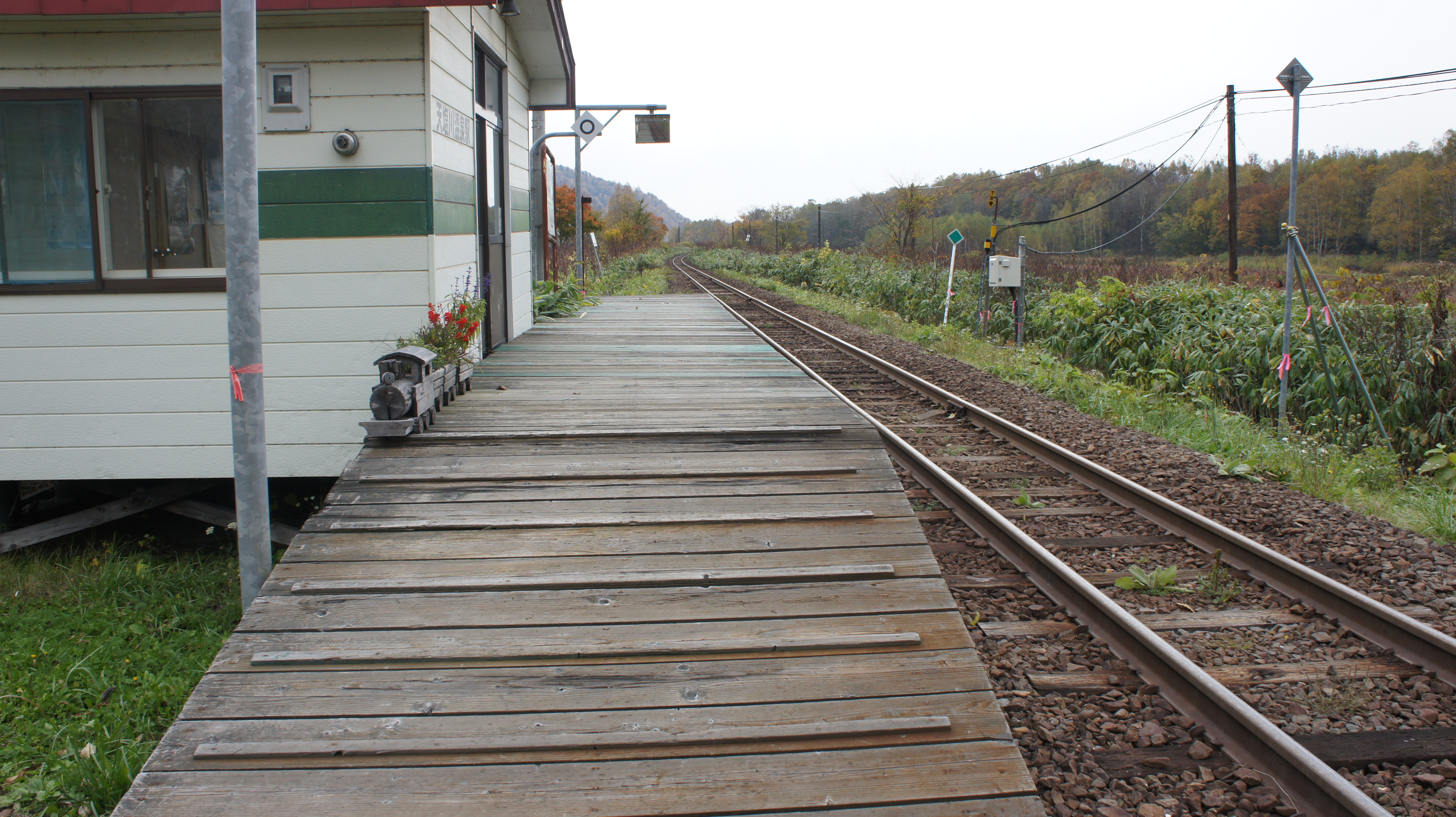
Platform

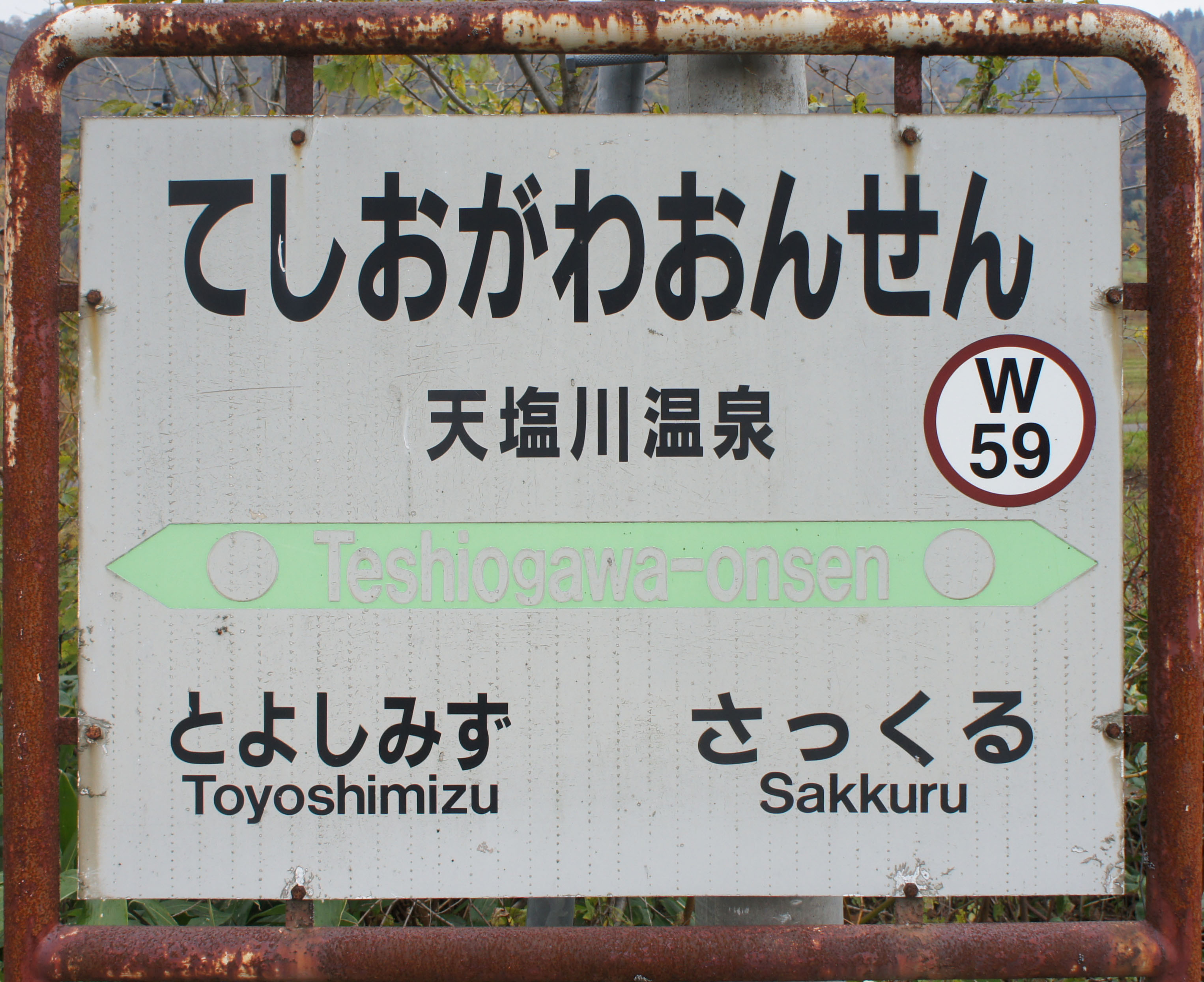
Signage

== History ==
Teshiogawa-Onsen Station began as the Minamisakkuru Temporary Station (南咲来仮乗降場) on 1 July 1956, and was renamed Teshiogawa Onsen Temporary Station (天塩川温泉仮乗降場) on 1 July 1981. With the privatization of Japanese National Railways (JNR) on 1 April 1987, it was upgraded to a full passenger station and came under the control of JR Hokkaido.

In June 2023, this station was selected to be among 42 stations on the JR Hokkaido network to be slated for abolition owing to low ridership. In December 2020 JR Hokkaido announced that maintenance and management would be transferred to Otoineppu Village from fiscal year 2021

== Passenger statistics ==
During the period between fiscal 2011 and 2015, the station was used on average by less than one passenger daily.

== Surrounding area ==
- Japan National Route 40
- Teshio River

== See also ==
- List of railway stations in Japan
