= Toyotomi Station =

Railway station in Toyotomi, Hokkaido, Japan

W74 Toyotomi Station 豊富駅
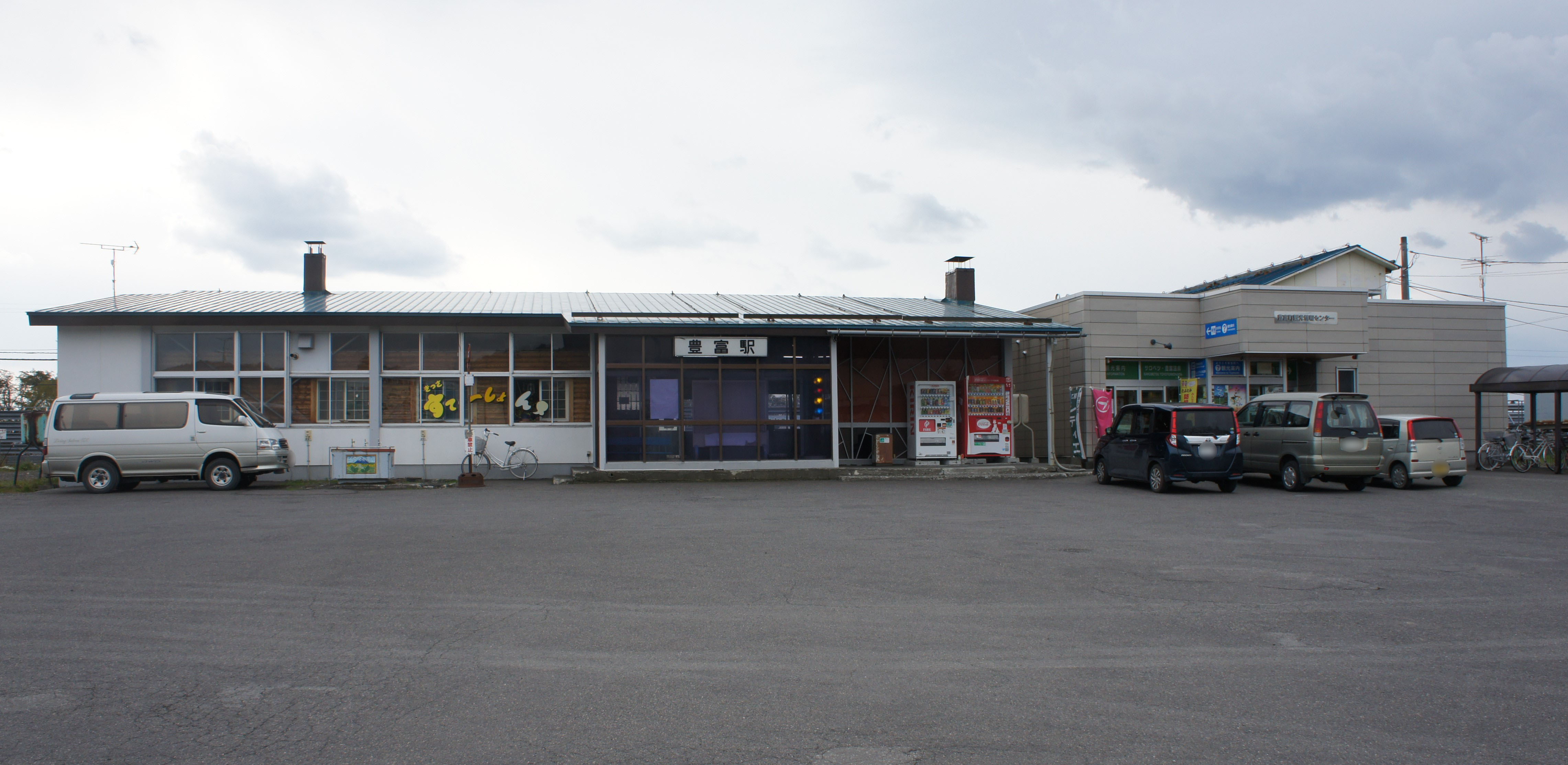
- Toyotomi Station building, October 2017

General information
- Location: Toyotomiekimaedori, Toyotomi-chō, Teshio-gun, Hokkaido 098-4138; Japan
- Coordinates: 45°6′16.3″N 141°46′20.6″E
- System: regional rail
- Operator: JR Hokkaido
- Line: Sōya Main Line
- Distance: 215.9 km (134.2 mi) from Asahikawa
- Platforms: 2 side platforms

Construction
- Structure type: At grade

Other information
- Status: Staffed (Kan'i itaku)
- Station code: W74
- Website: Official website

History
- Opened: 25 September 1926
- Rebuilt: 1966

Passengers
- 2022: 28 daily

Services
Preceding station	JR Hokkaido	Following station
Kabutonuma towards Wakkanai	Sōya Main Line Local	Shimonuma towards Asahikawa
Minami-Wakkanai towards Wakkanai	Sōya Main Line Sōya / Sarobetsu	Horonobe towards Asahikawa
Location
- Location within Hokkaido Location within Japan

Toyotomi Station (豊富駅, Toyotomi-eki) is a railway station located in the town of Toyotomi, Hokkaidō, Japan. It is operated by JR Hokkaido.

== Lines ==
The station is served by the Sōya Main Line and is located 215.9 km from the starting point of the line at Asahikawa. Sōya and Sarobetsu limited express services stop at this station.

== Layout ==
Toyotomi Station is a ground-level station with two side platforms connected by a footbridge. The station building is staffed. In the past, the Nisso Coal Mine Tenshio Mining Works private railway branched off here until its closure in 1972.

=== Platforms ===
1	■ Soya Main Line	for Horonobe and Nayoro
2	■ Soya Main Line	for Wakkanai

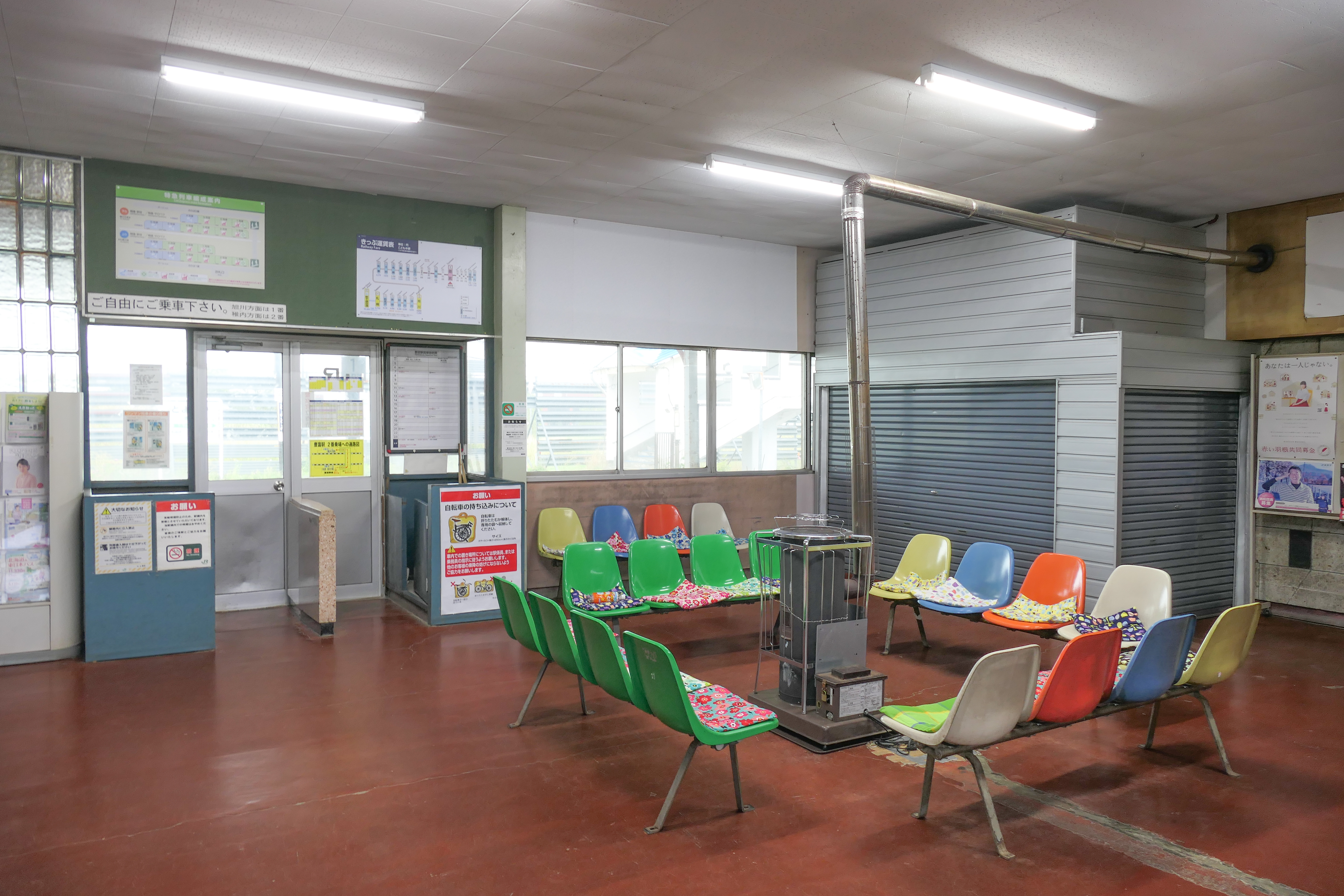
inside station building

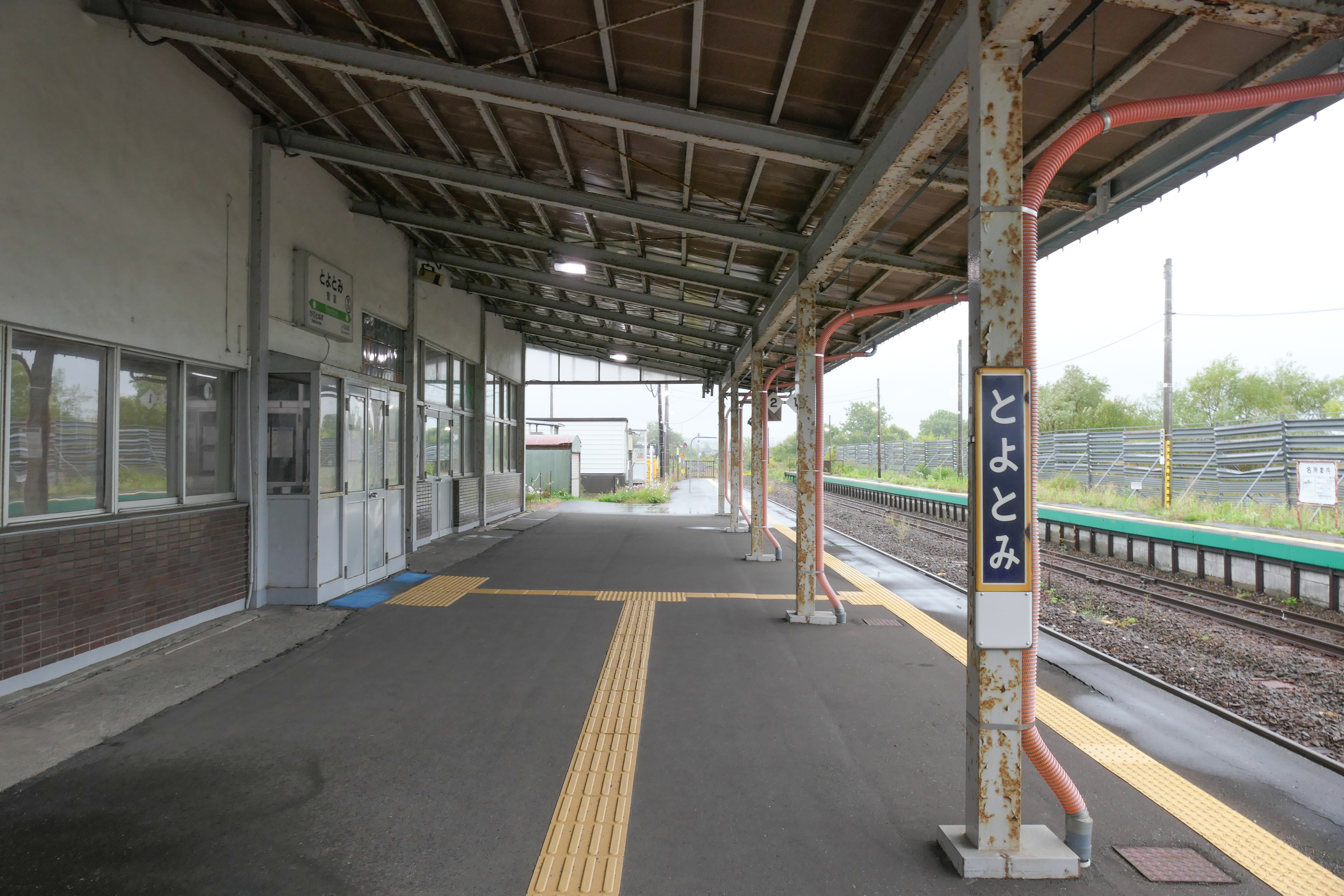
Platform 1

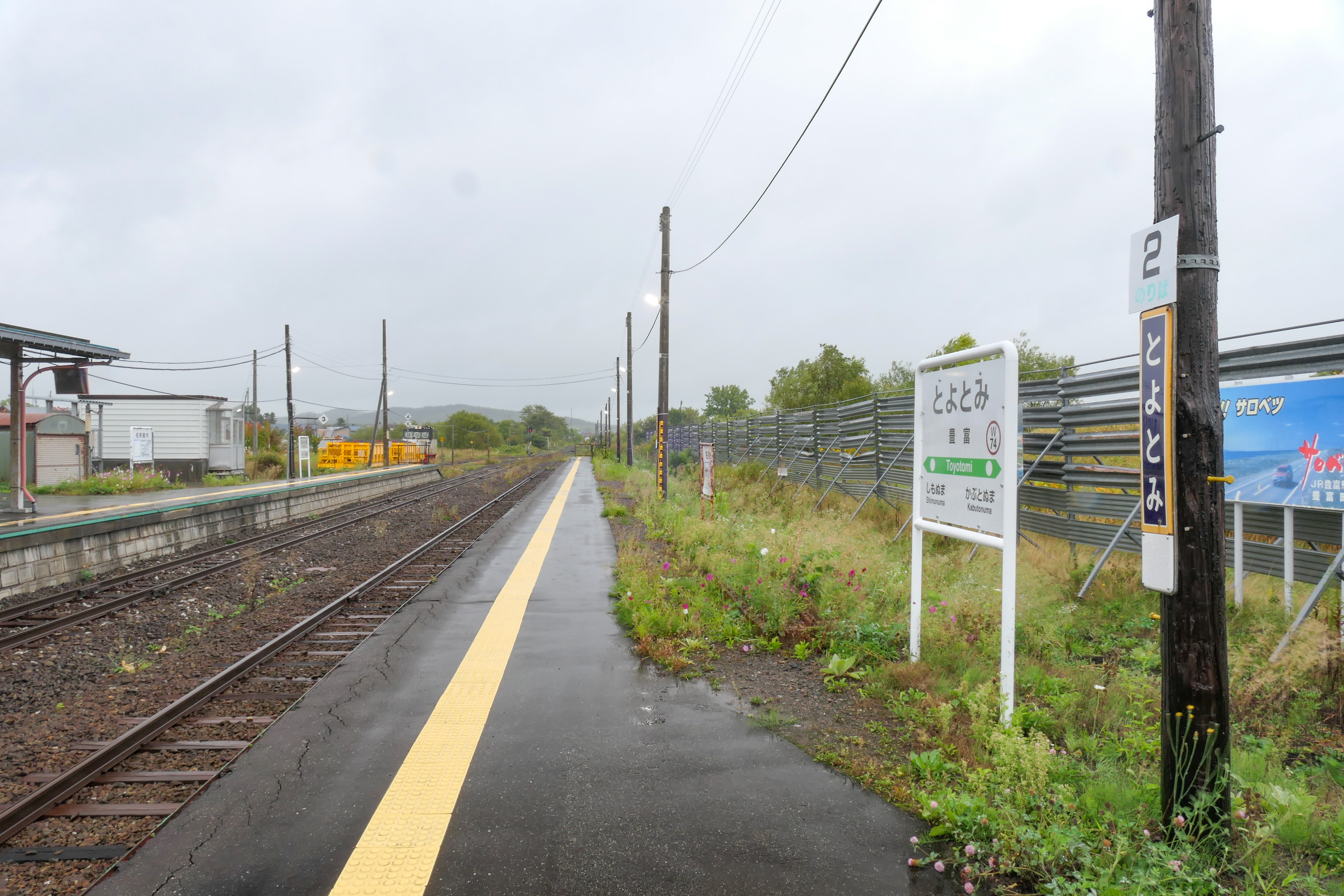
Platform 2

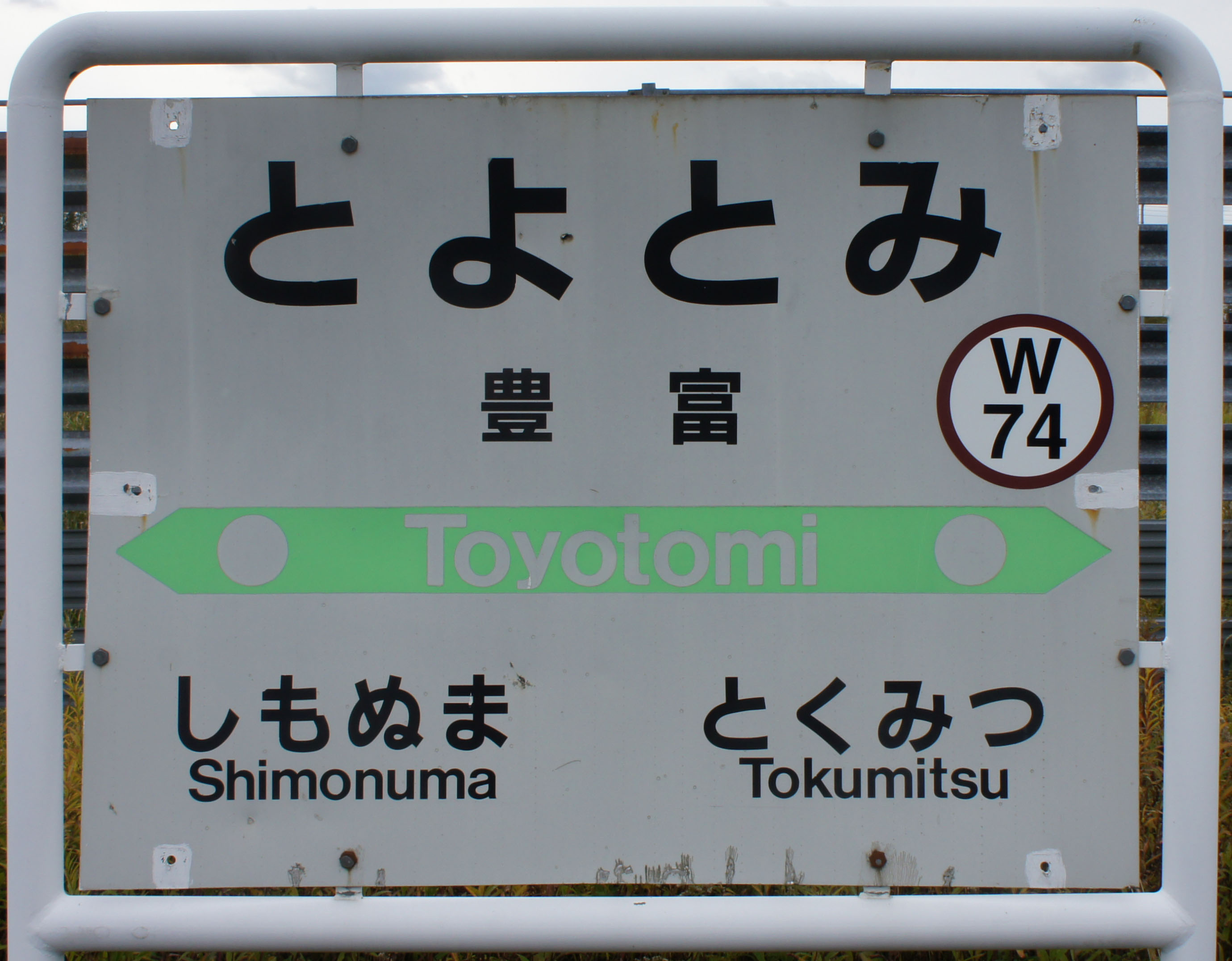
signage

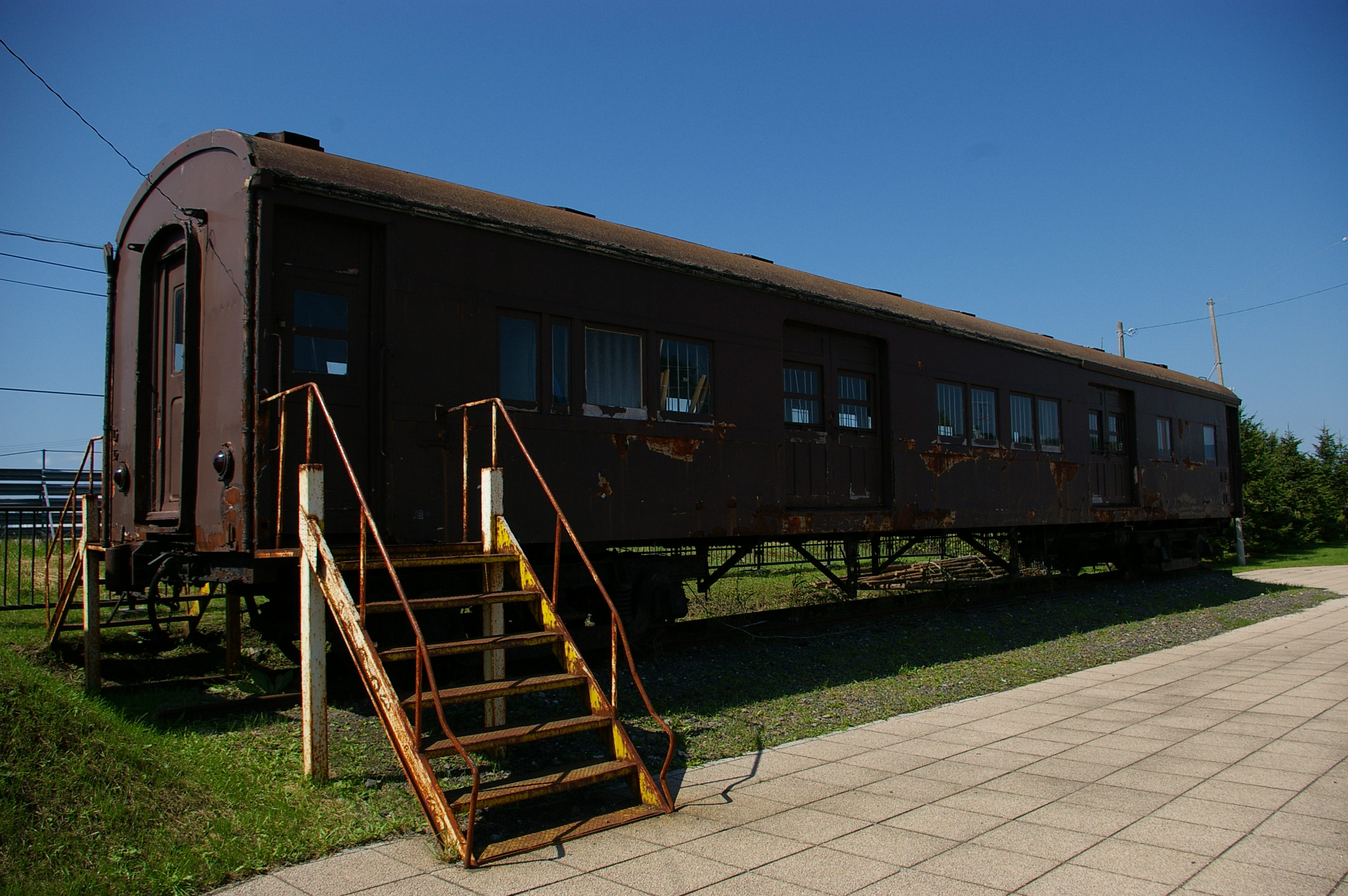
JNR 60 series passenger car on display in front of the station

== History ==
The station was opened on 25 September 1926 with the opening of the Japanese Government Railways (JGR) Teshio Line. On April 1, 1930 the Teshio Line was incorporated into the Sōya Main Line. With the privatization of Japanese National Railways (JNR), the successor of JGR, on 1 April 1987, JR Hokkaido took over control of the station.

The station opened on 25 September 1926.

== Passenger statistics ==
In fiscal 2022, the station was used by an average of 28 passengers daily.

== Surrounding area ==
- National Route 40
- Toyotomi Town Office
- Hokkaido Toyotomi High School

== See also ==
- List of railway stations in Japan
