= Horonobe Station =

Railway station in Horonobe, Hokkaido, Japan

W72 Horonobe Station 幌延駅
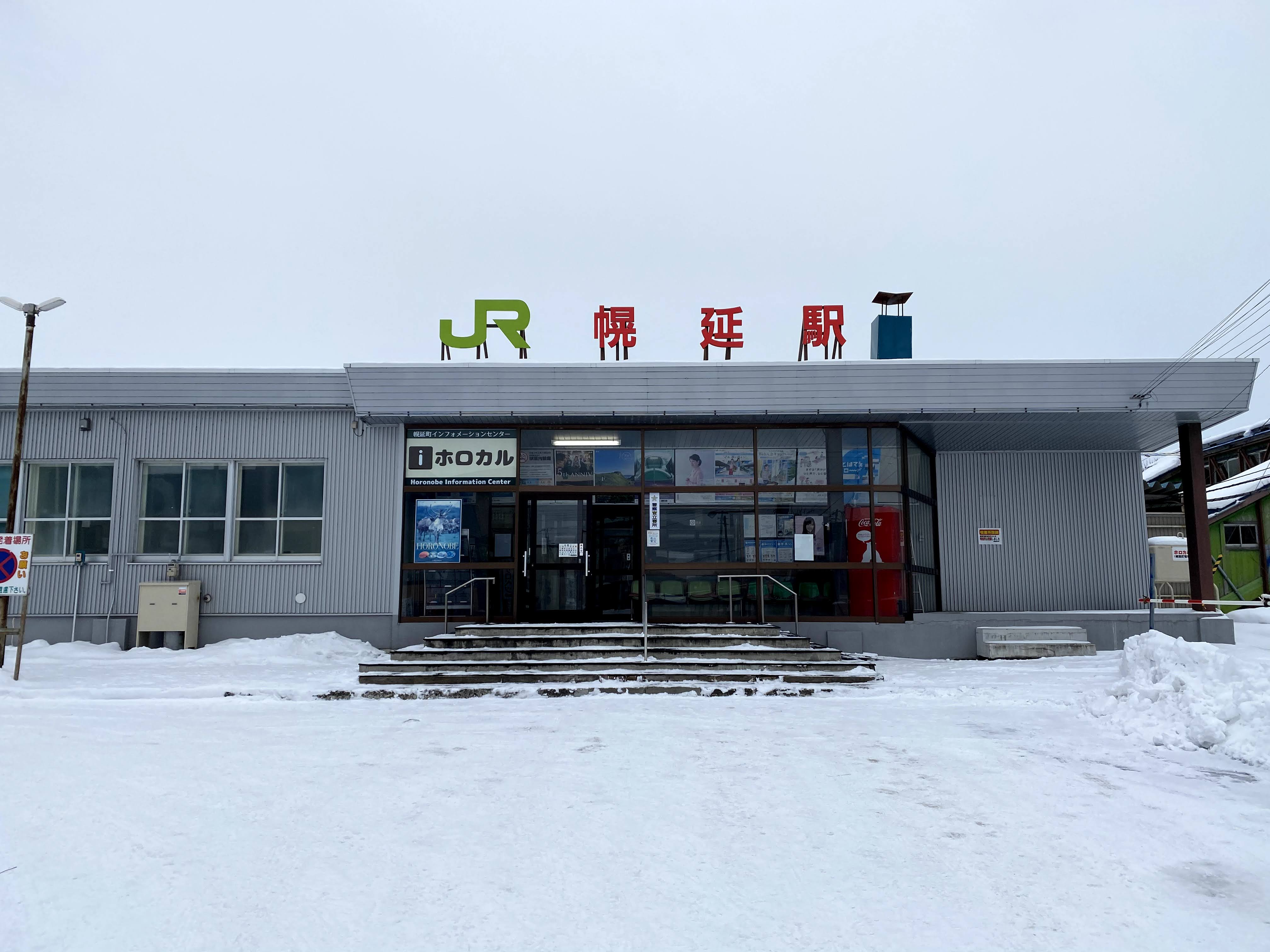
- Station building in December 2020

General information
- Location: 1 Chome 1 Jokita, Horonobe-cho, Teshio-gun, Hokkaido 098-3201; Japan
- Coordinates: 45°0′52.6″N 141°50′45.3″E
- System: regional rail
- Operator: JR Hokkaido
- Lines: Sōya Main Line; Haboro Line (closed)
- Distance: 199.4 km (123.9 mi) from Asahikawa (Sōya Main Line); 141.1 km (87.7 mi) from Rumoi (Haboro Line, closed)
- Platforms: 2 side platforms

Construction
- Structure type: At grade

Other information
- Status: Staffed (Midori no Madoguchi)
- Station code: W72
- Website: Official website

History
- Opened: 20 July 1925
- Rebuilt: 1973

Passengers
- FY2023: 46 (daily)

Services
Preceding station	JR Hokkaido	Following station
Shimonuma W73 towards Wakkanai	Sōya Main Line Local	Nukanan W67 towards Asahikawa
Toyotomi W74 towards Wakkanai	Sōya Main Line Sōya / Sarobetsu	Teshio-Nakagawa W64 towards Asahikawa
Location
- Location within Hokkaido Location within Japan

Horonobe Station (幌延駅, Horonobe-eki) is a railway station located in the town of Horonobe, Hokkaidō, Japan. It is operated by JR Hokkaido.

== Lines ==
The station is served by the Sōya Main Line and is located 199.4 km from the starting point of the line at Asahikawa. It was also served by the Haboro Line before it closed on 30 March 1987 and became the terminus station of Haboro Line. Sōya and Sarobetsu limited express services stop at this station.

== Layout ==
Horonobe Station is an interchange station with two tracks and two platforms: a side platform and an island platform (used on one side). The platforms are connected by a footbridge. Platforms 1 and 2 have departure signals for both Nayoro/Asahikawa and Wakkanai. Platform 3, on the outside of the island platform, used to be used by the Haboro Line, but after its closure, there are no regular trains and it is now treated as a siding. The station has a Midori no Madoguchi staffed ticket office.

=== Platforms ===
1	■ Soya Main Line	for Wakkanai
2	■ Soya Main Line	for Nayoro and Asahikawa

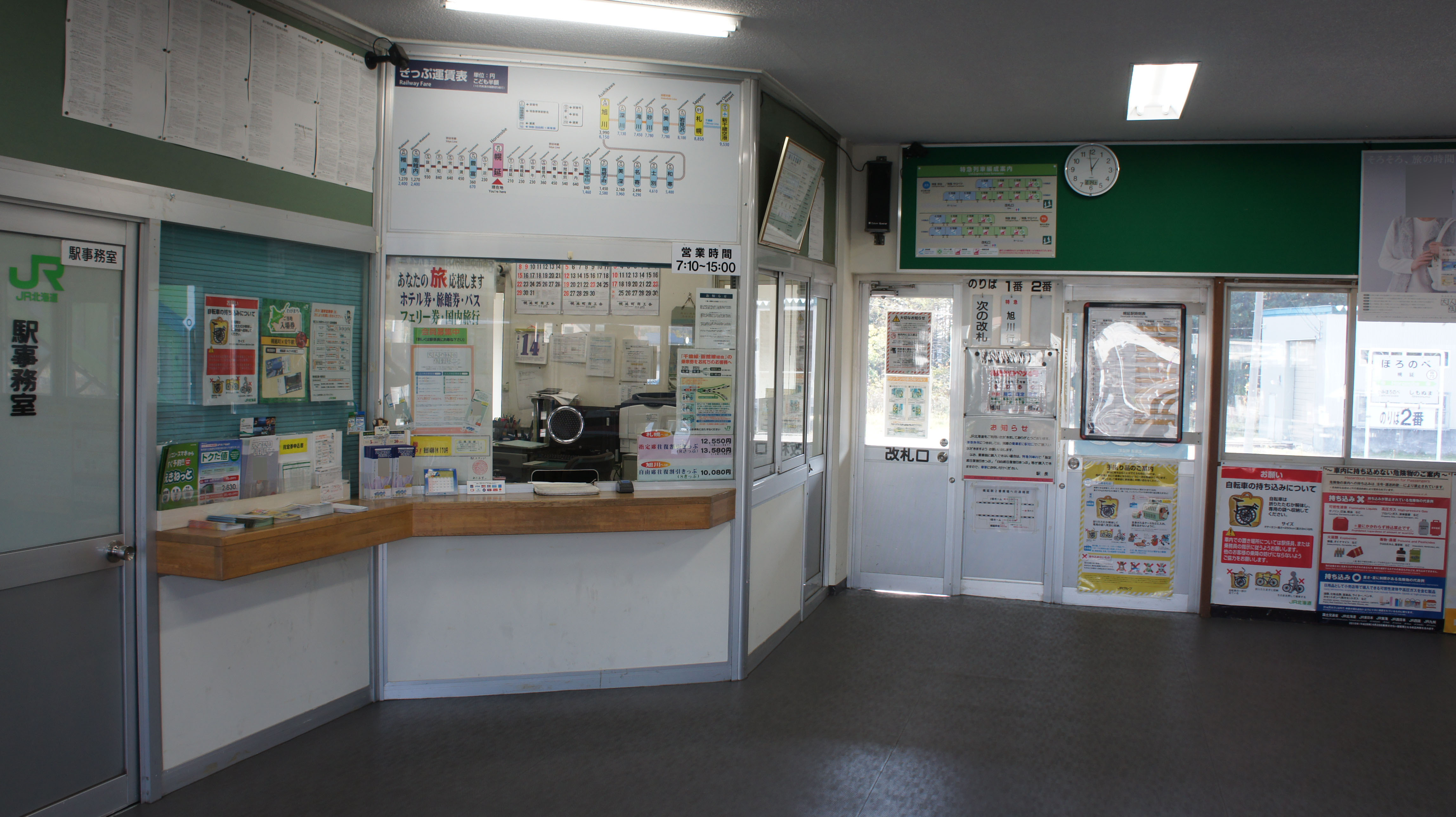
Exit gate

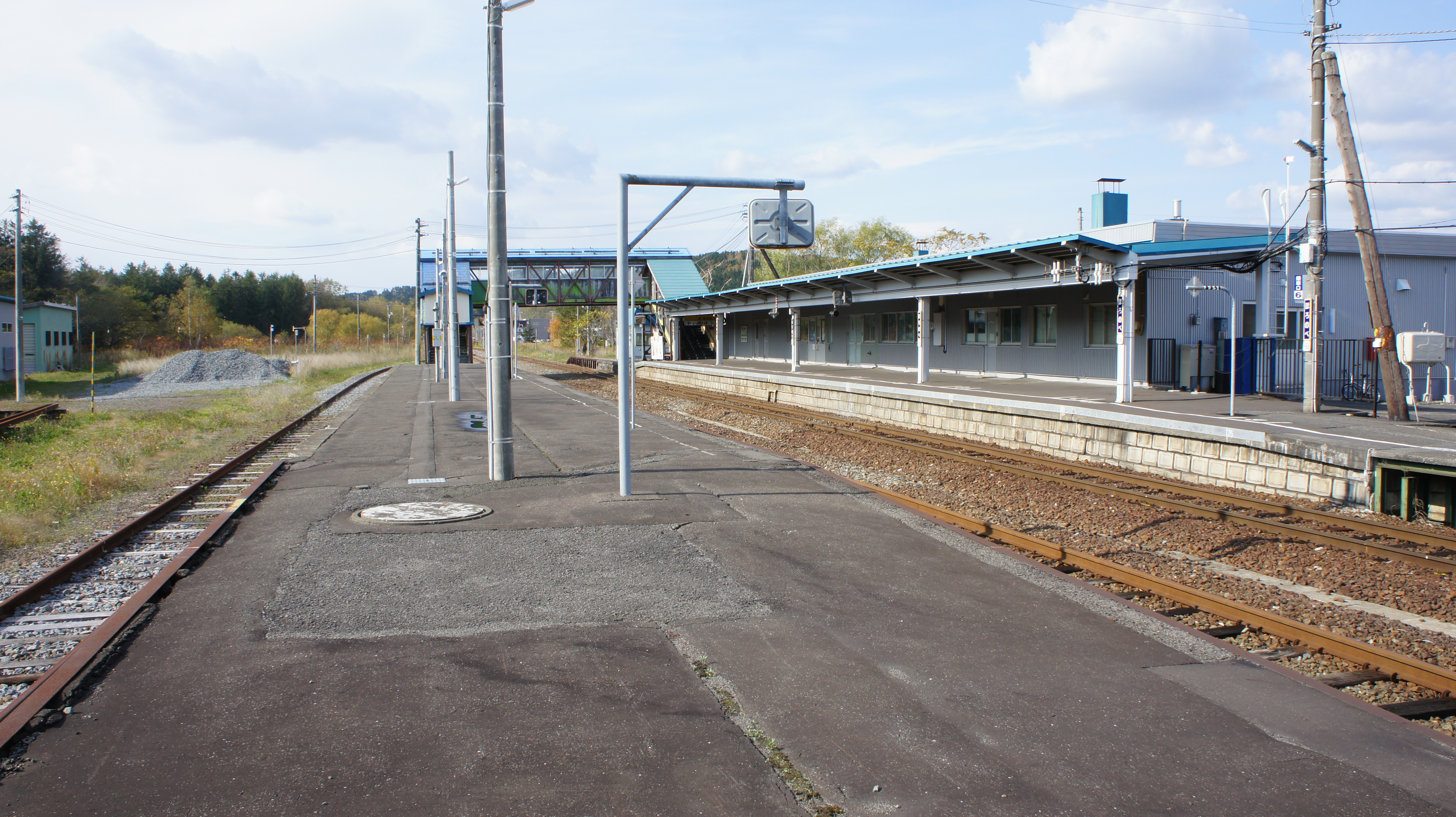
Platform

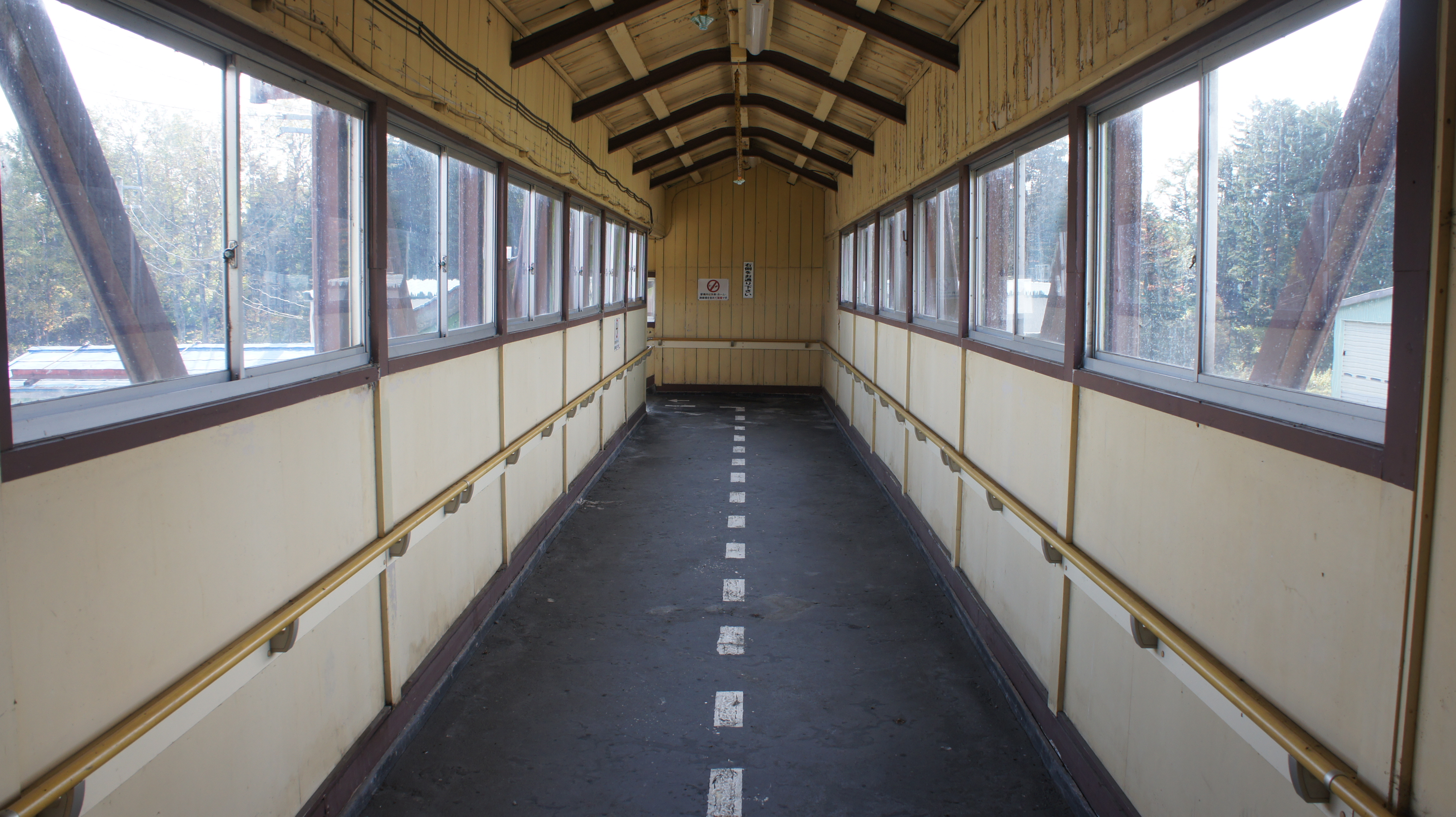
Footbridge

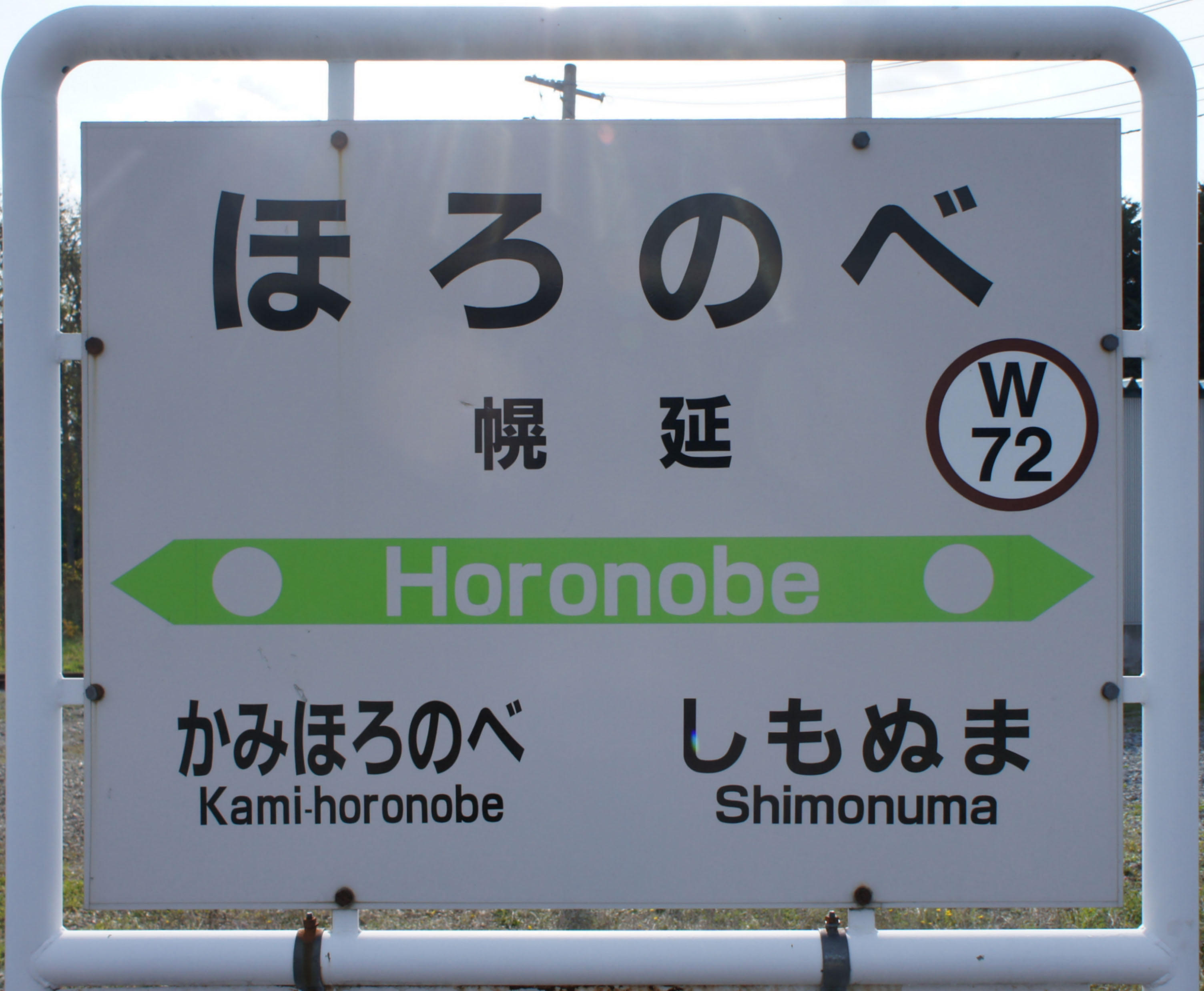
Signboard

== History ==
The station was opened on 20 July 1925 with the opening of the Japanese Government Railways (JGR) Teshio South Line. On April 1, 1930 the Teshio Line was incorporated into the Sōya Main Line. With the privatization of Japanese National Railways (JNR), the successor of JGR, on 1 April 1987, JR Hokkaido took over control of the station. In 2019, JR Hokkaido and Sagawa Express began a mixed freight and passenger service between Wakkanai and Horonobe Station.

== Passenger statistics ==
In FY2023, the station was used by an average of 46 passengers daily. (Note: Data published by the Ministry of Land, Infrastructure, Transport and Tourism state the number of passengers boarding and disembarking by station in a given year. FY2023 covers the period from 1 April 2023 to 31 March 2024. Data published by individual railways directly may state the number boarding only.)

== Surrounding area ==
- Horonobe Town Hall

== See also ==
- List of railway stations in Japan
