= Sarobetsu (train) =

Japanese limited express train service

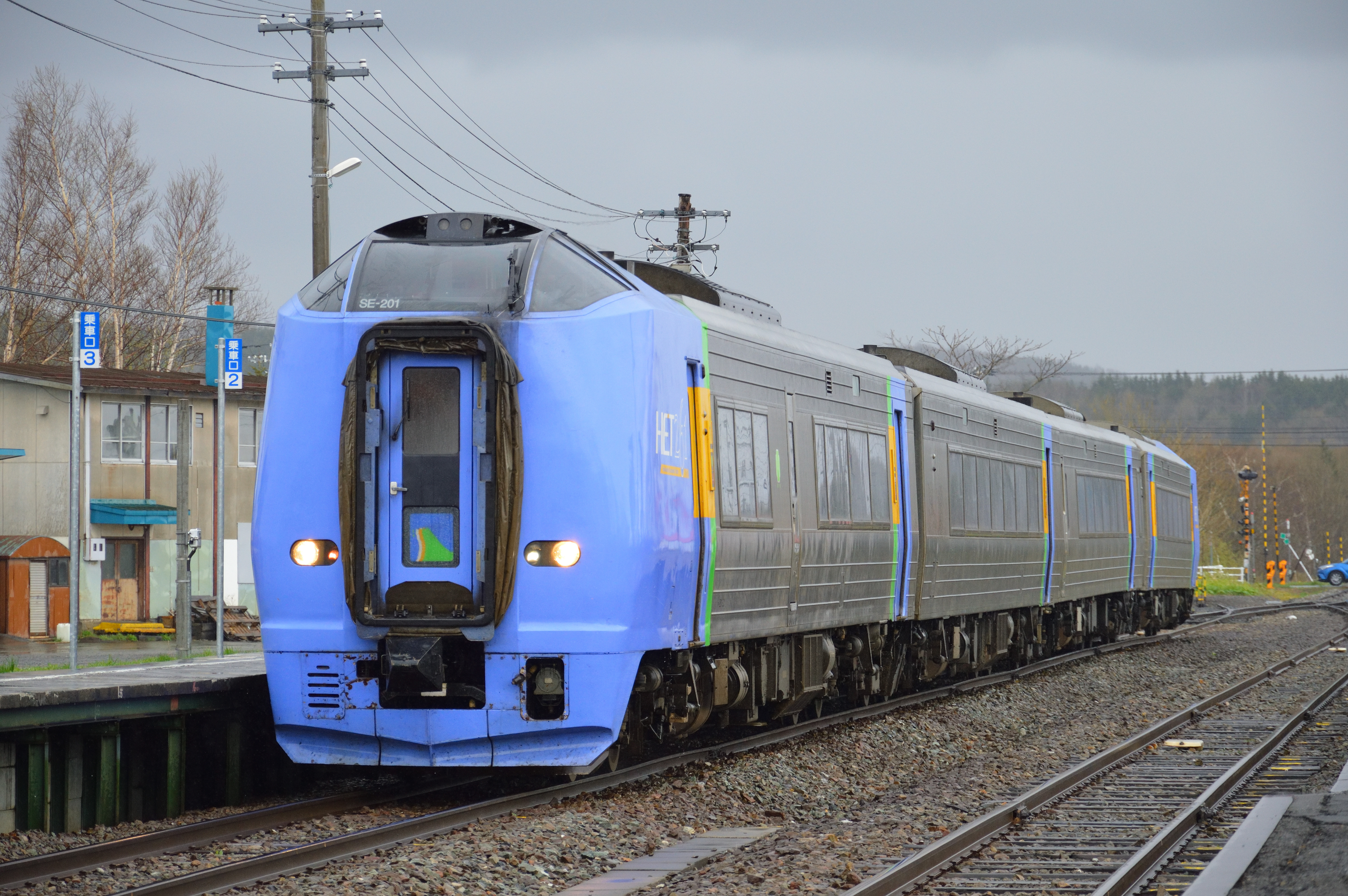
- KiHa 261 series DMU on a Sarobetsu service, May 2018 at Horonobe Station

Overview
- Service type: Limited express
- Status: Operational
- First service: 1 July 1992
- Current operator: JR Hokkaido

Route
- Termini: Asahikawa; Wakkanai
- Stops: 11
- Distance travelled: 259.4 km (161.2 mi)
- Average journey time: 3 hours 45 minutes approx
- Service frequency: 2 return trips daily
- Line used: Sōya Main Line

On-board services
- Class: Standard + Green
- Disabled access: Yes
- Sleeping arrangements: None
- Catering facilities: None
- Observation facilities: None
- Entertainment facilities: None
- Other facilities: Toilets

Technical
- Rolling stock: KiHa 261 series DMU
- Electrification: Diesel
- Operating speed: 120 km/h (75 mph)
- Track owner: JR Hokkaido

The Sarobetsu (サロベツ) is a limited express train service between Asahikawa and Wakkanai in Hokkaido, Japan, which is operated by Hokkaido Railway Company (JR Hokkaido). Two trains per day operate in each direction, with the journey taking approximately 3 hours 45 minutes.

== Stations ==
Trains stop at the following stations:

Asahikawa - Wassamu - Shibetsu - Nayoro - Bifuka - Otoineppu - Teshio-Nakagawa - Horonobe - Toyotomi - Minami-Wakkanai - Wakkanai

== Rolling stock ==
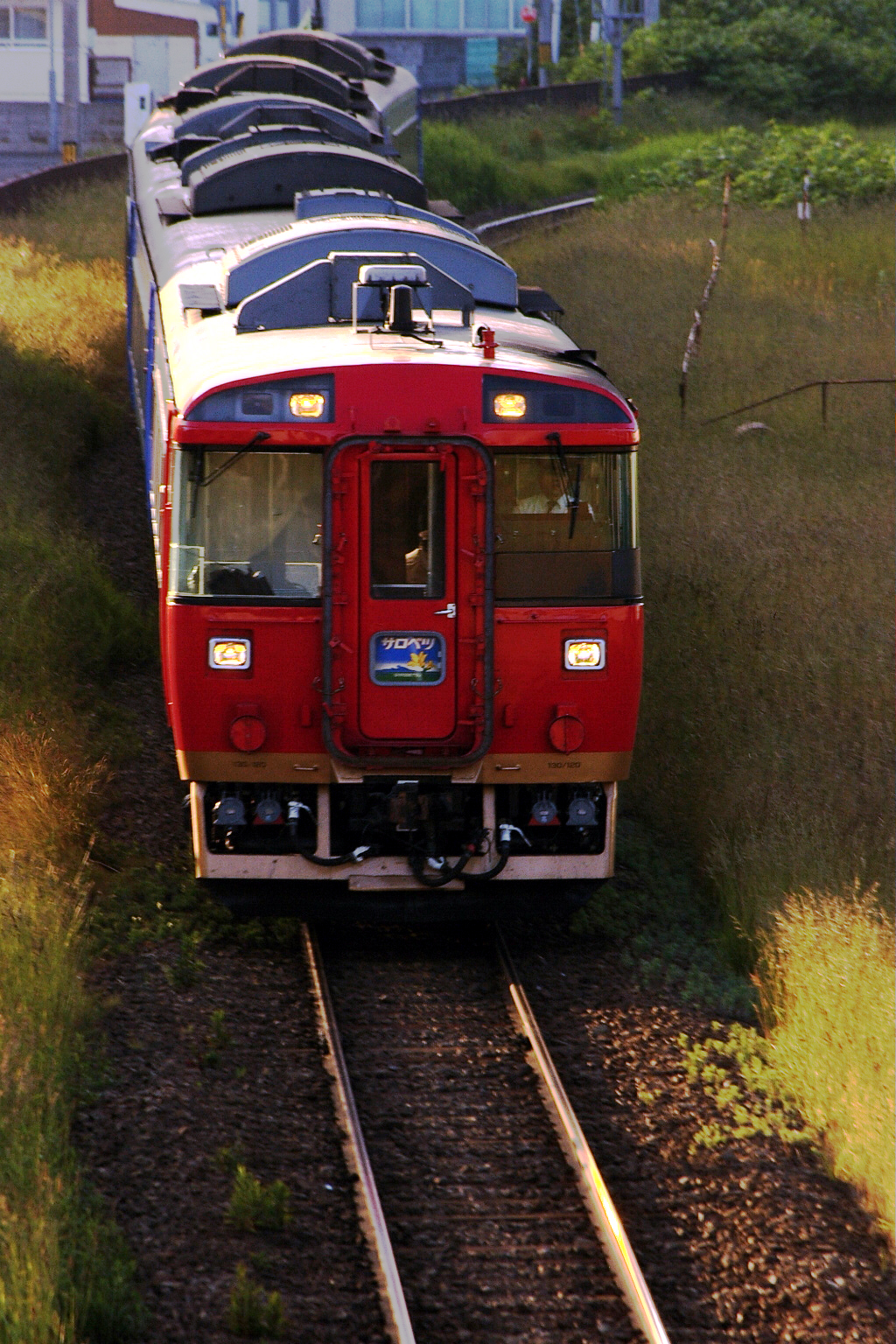
Sarobetsu KiHa 183 series DMU with additional Japanese seating car leading, October 2007

Services are normally formed of 4-car KiHa 261 series DMUs, with Car No. 1 at the Wakkanai end and Car No. 4 at the Asahikawa end. Car No. 1 consists of both ordinary-class seats and the Green Car, while the other cars are ordinary-class cars. All seats are non-smoking. Up until 2007, an additional "Japanese-style seating car" (お座敷車, Ozashikisha) was attached to the train during busy seasons.

| Car No. | 1 | | 2 | 3 | 4 |
|---|---|---|---|---|---|
| Class | Green car | Reserved | Reserved | Reserved | Non-reserved |
| Facilities | | | Toilets | Wheelchair-accessible toilet | |

== History ==
One of the Sōya services changed its name to Sarobetsu on July 1, 1992. At that time both Sōya and Sarobetsu ran between Sapporo and Wakkanai. However, the Sarobetsu service had no green cars, in contrast to Sōya, and stopped at these stations: Sapporo - Iwamizawa - Bibai - Sunagawa - Takikawa - Fukagawa - Asahikawa - Wassamu - Shibetsu - Nayoro - Bifuka - Otoineppu - Teshio-Nakagawa - Horonobe - Toyotomi - Minami-Wakkanai - Wakkanai

The Sarobetsu service was suspended, as the KiHa 183 series, which was the same type of train used for the service at that time, was involved in a fire on the Hakodate Main Line in July 2013. The service was supposed to resume the following month, but was delayed due to the accident investigation and resulting preventative measures. The suspension ended on March 31, 2014. In the meantime, a temporary rapid train service replaced the Sarobetsu.

From the start of the revised timetable of 4 March 2017, the Sarobetsu service was re-routed to operate between Asahikawa and Wakkanai, when the Lilac was introduced between Sapporo and Asahikawa. Also, the KiHa 261 series sets were used to replace the ageing KiHa 183 series sets.
