= Sōya (train) =

Japanese limited express train service

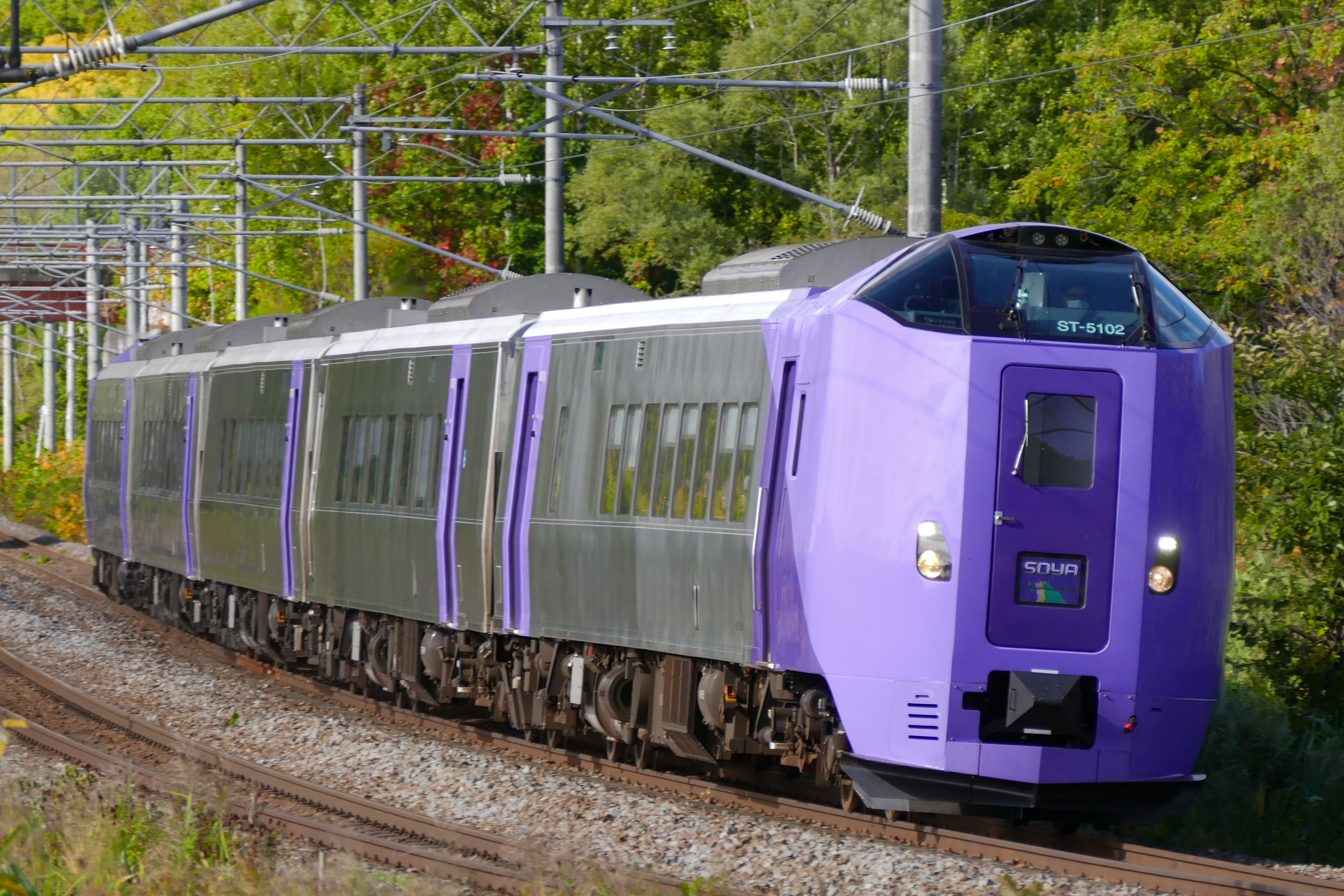
- KiHa 261 series DMU on a Sōya service, September 2021

Overview
- Service type: Limited express
- Status: Operational
- Locale: Hokkaido
- First service: 11 March 2000
- Current operator: JR Hokkaido

Route
- Termini: Sapporo; Wakkanai
- Stops: 17
- Distance travelled: 396.2 km (246.2 mi)
- Average journey time: 5 hours 10 minutes
- Service frequency: One return service daily
- Lines used: Hakodate Main Line, Sōya Main Line

On-board services
- Class: Standard + Green
- Disabled access: Yes
- Sleeping arrangements: None
- Catering facilities: None
- Observation facilities: None
- Entertainment facilities: None
- Other facilities: Toilets

Technical
- Rolling stock: KiHa 261 series DMUs
- Track gauge: 1,067 mm (3 ft 6 in)
- Electrification: None
- Operating speed: 120 km/h (75 mph)
- Track owner: JR Hokkaido

The Sōya (宗谷) is a limited express train service between Sapporo and Wakkanai in Hokkaido, which is operated by Hokkaido Railway Company (JR Hokkaido). It was named Super Sōya (スーパー宗谷) between 2000 and 2017.

== Service pattern ==
There is only one single daily return working per direction, with an average journey time between Sapporo and Wakkanai lasting approximately 5 hours 10 minutes. Trains operate at a maximum speed of 120 kilometers per hour (75 mph).

The train operates over the same route as the Sarobetsu, which operates between Asahikawa and Wakkanai.

== Station stops ==
The service calls at the following stations:

Station List
Line	Station	Note
Hakodate	01 Sapporo	
Hakodate	A13 Iwamizawa	
Hakodate	A16 Bibai	Trains for Sapporo do not stop here
Hakodate	A20 Sunagawa	Trains for Sapporo do not stop here
Hakodate	A21 Takikawa	
Hakodate	A24 Fukagawa	
Hakodate	A28 Asahikawa	
Soya	W38 Wassamu	
Soya	W42 Shibetsu	
Soya	W48 Nayoro	
Soya	W54 Bifuka	
Soya	W61 Otoineppu	
Soya	W64 Teshio-Nakagawa	
Soya	W72 Horonobe	
Soya	W74 Toyotomi	
Soya	W79 Minami-Wakkanai	
Soya	W80 Wakkanai	

== Rolling stock ==
Services are normally formed of 4-car KiHa 261 series DMUs, which were introduced from the start of services on 11 March 2000, with car 1 at the Wakkanai end. Car 1 consists of both ordinary-class seats and the Green Car, while the other cars are ordinary-class cars. All cars are no-smoking. These are lengthened to 6 cars during busy seasons.

=== Future plans ===
On 19 November 2025, JR Hokkaido announced that all non-reserved seating on Sōya services would be eliminated effective the next timetable revision, making all trains operate solely with reserved seating.

Car No.	1		2	3	4
Class	Green car	Reserved	Reserved	Reserved	Non-reserved
Facilities			Toilets	Wheelchair-accessible toilet	
