= Hokkaido Railway Company =

Japanese railway company

- Native name: 北海道旅客鉄道株式会社
- Romanized name: Hokkaidō Ryokaku Tetsudō kabushiki gaisha
- Type: State-owned
- Industry: Rail transport
- Predecessor: Japanese National Railways (JNR)
- Founded: 1 April 1987; 39 years ago (privatization of JNR)
- Headquarters: Chūō-ku, Sapporo, Hokkaido, Japan
- Area served: Hokkaido
- Products: Kitaca (a rechargeable contactless smart card)
- Services: Passenger rail Freight services Intercity bus
- Owner: Japan Railway Construction, Transport and Technology Agency
- Number of employees: 7,970 (as of 1 April 2007)
- Subsidiaries: JR Hokkaido Bus Company
- Website: jrhokkaido.co.jp (in English)

The Hokkaido Railway Company (Japanese: 北海道旅客鉄道株式会社, Hepburn: Hokkaidō Ryokaku Tetsudō kabushiki gaisha) is one of the constituent companies of the Japan Railways Group (JR Group), and is often referred to by its official abbreviation: JR Hokkaido (JR北海道, Jeiāru Hokkaidō). It operates intercity and local rail services in Hokkaido, Japan. The company introduced Kitaca, a smart card ticketing system, in Autumn 2008.

At the time of its privatization in 1987, JR Hokkaido operated 21 railway lines totalling 3,176.6 kilometres (1,973.8 mi) of narrow-gauge (1,067 mm (3 ft 6 in)) track, as well as a ferry service to Aomori. Since then, that figure has dwindled to just below 2,500 kilometres (1,600 mi), as unprofitable lines have been shut down or spun off (in the case of the Hokkaidō Chihoku Kōgen Railway and the South Hokkaido Railway Company). The ferry service has also been replaced by the 53.85-kilometre-long (33.46 mi) dual-gauge Seikan Tunnel for railways.

On 19 November 2016, JR Hokkaido's president announced plans to further rationalize its network by the withdrawal of services from up to 1,237 km, or about 50% of the current network, including closure of the remaining section of the Rumoi Main Line (the Rumoi–Mashike section closed on 4 December 2016, the Ishikari-Numata–Rumoi section on 1 April 2023, and the final Fugagawa–Ishikari-Numata section on 1 April 2026), the Shin-Yubari–Yubari section of the Sekisho Line (closed on 1 April 2019), the non-electrified section of the Sassho Line (closed 17 April 2020), and the Furano–Shintoku section of the Nemuro Line (closed 31 March 2024). Other lines, including the Sekihoku Main Line, Senmo Main Line, the Nayoro–Wakkanai section of the Soya Main Line, and the Kushiro–Nemuro section ("Hanasaki Line") of the Nemuro Line, have been proposed for conversion to third-sector operation. JR Hokkaido closed 25 stations from March 2021 to March 2022 due to a decrease in passengers.

JR Hokkaido's headquarters are in Chūō-ku, Sapporo.

== History ==
- 1 April 1987: Upon the privatization of the Japanese National Railways (JNR), the Hokkaido Railway Company was formed
- 25 October 2008: Kitaca contactless smart card introduced in Sapporo area
- 26 March 2016: First Hokkaido Shinkansen service between Shin-Aomori and Shin-Hakodate-Hokuto launched.

== Headquarters and branch offices ==
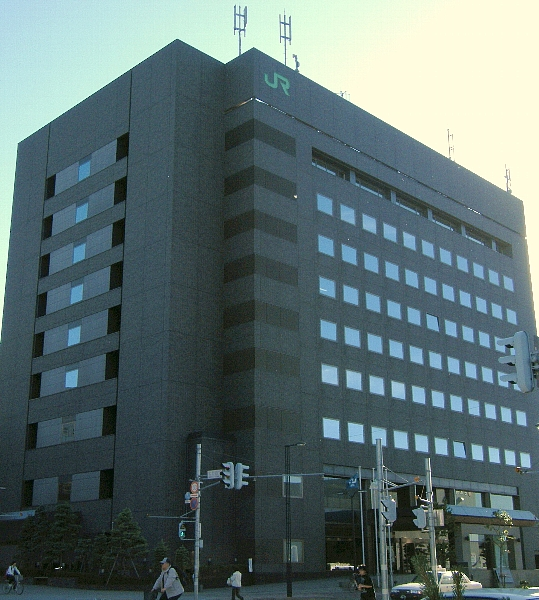
Headquarters building

- Headquarters: 1-1-15 Kita-11-jō-Nishi, Chūō-ku, Sapporo
- Branch offices:
  - Asahikawa branch office: 6-4152-2 Miyashita-dōri, Asahikawa
  - Hakodate branch office: 12-5 Wakamatsu-chō, Hakodate
  - Kushiro branch office: 5-14 Kita-ōdōri, Kushiro

== Lines and key stations ==
Lines of JR Hokkaido (as of 2026)

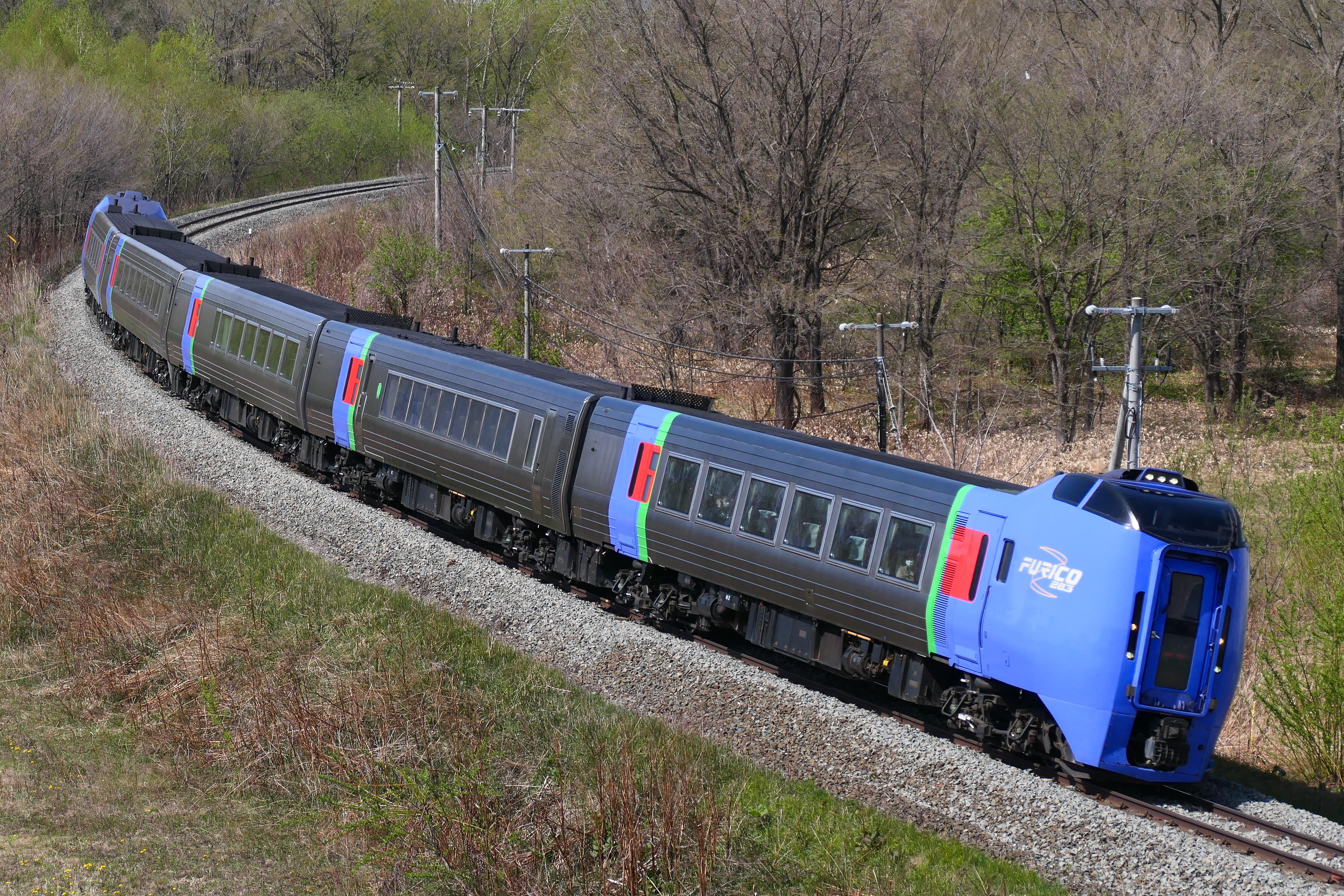
KiHa 283 series DMU Ōzora

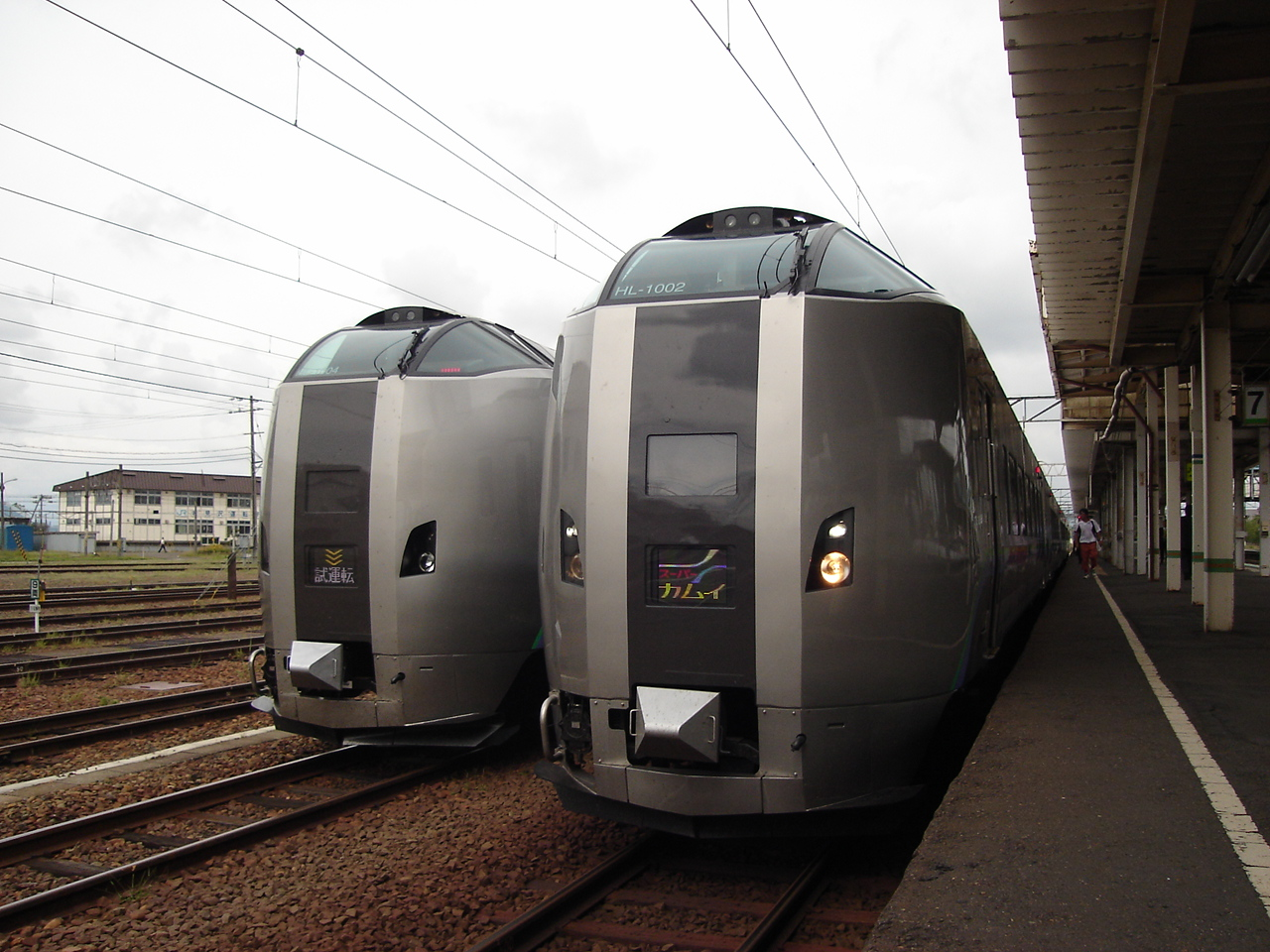
789-1000 series EMU Super Kamui

=== Shinkansen ===
- Hokkaido Shinkansen:
  - Shin-Aomori - Shin-Hakodate-Hokuto 148.9 km (92.5 mi)

=== Trunk lines ===
- Chitose Line:
  - Shiroishi - Numanohata 60.2 km (37.4 mi)
  - Minami-Chitose - New Chitose Airport 2.6 km (1.6 mi)
- Hakodate Main Line( (Note: Most trains run between Sapporo and Oshamanbe.))
  - Hakodate - Ōnuma-Kōen - Otaru - Sapporo - Asahikawa 423.1 km (262.9 mi)
  - Nanae - Oshima-Sawara - Mori 35.3 km (21.9 mi)
- Muroran Main Line
  - Oshamanbe - Higashi-Muroran - Oiwake - Iwamizawa 211.0 km (131.1 mi)
  - Higashi-Muroran - Muroran 7.0 km (4.3 mi)
- Nemuro Main Line
  - Takikawa - Furano 54.6 km (33.9 mi) and Shintoku - Nemuro 331.6 km (206.0 mi), a total of 386.2 km (240.0 mi)
- Sekishō Line
  - Minami-Chitose - Shintoku 132.4 km (82.3 mi)

=== Other lines ===
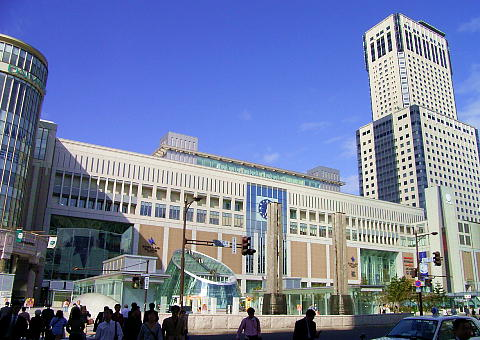
Sapporo Station

- Furano Line
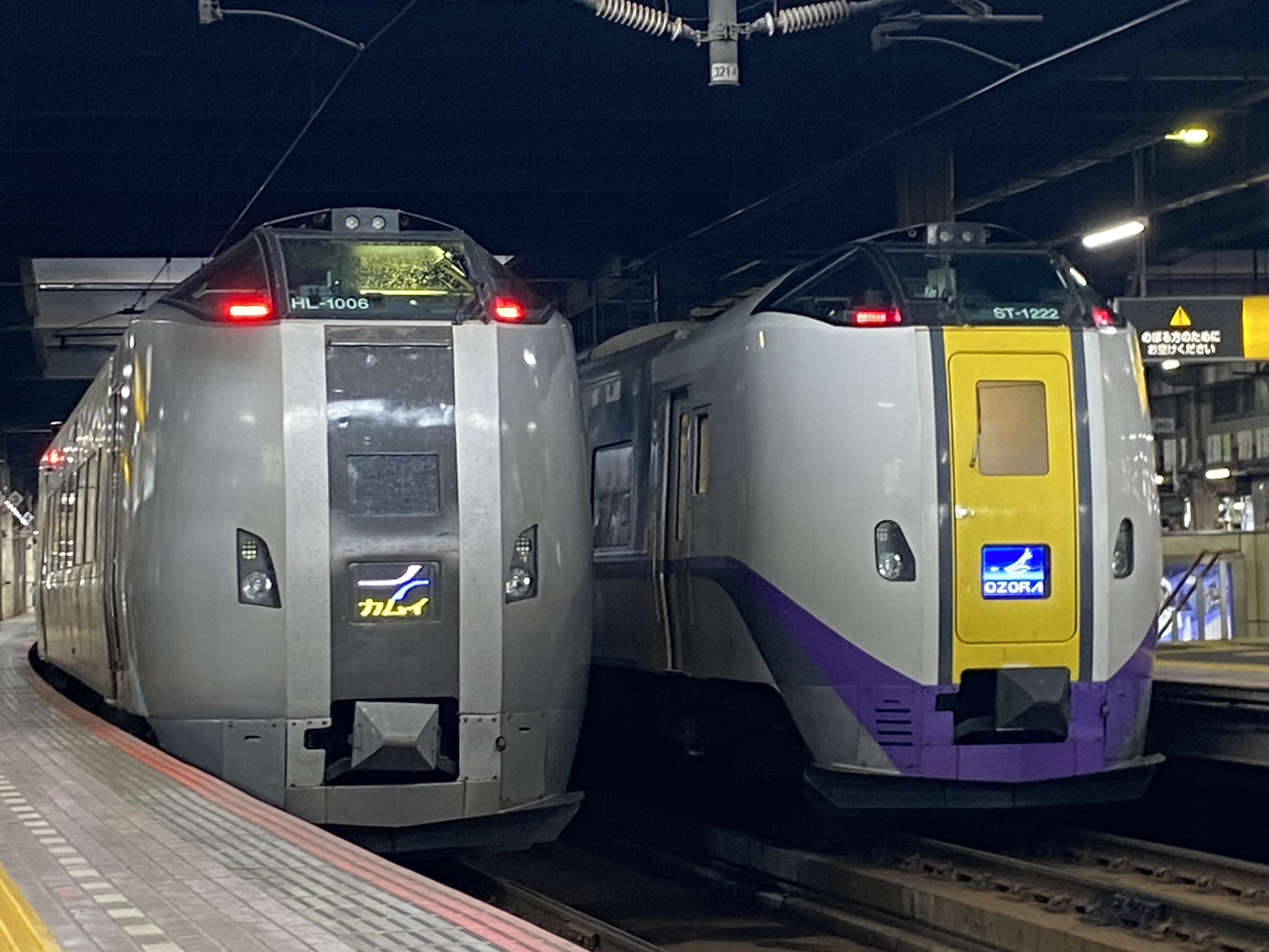
  Kamui 789-1000 & Ozora 261-1000 at Sapporo Station
  - Furano - Asahikawa 54.8 km (34.1 mi)
- Hidaka Main Line
  - Tomakomai - Mukawa 30.5 km (19.0 mi)
- Sekihoku Main Line
  - Shin-Asahikawa - Kitami - Abashiri 234.0 km (145.4 mi)
- Sasshō Line
  - Sōen - Hokkaidō-Iryōdaigaku 28.9 km (18.0 mi)
- Senmō Main Line
  - Higashi-Kushiro - Abashiri 166.2 km (103.3 mi)
- Sōya Main Line
  - Asahikawa - Nayoro - Wakkanai 259.4 km (161.2 mi)

=== Under construction ===
- Hokkaido Shinkansen
  - Shin-Hakodate-Hokuto - Sapporo 211.3 km (131.3 mi) scheduled to open in 2038 (as of October 2025)

=== Former lines ===
These lines were closed under the ownership of JR Hokkaido since 1987.

- Chihoku Line
  - Ikeda - Kitami 140.0 km (87.0 mi) transferred to Hokkaidō Chihoku Kōgen Railway Company on 4 June 1989, then closed on 21 April 2006
- Esashi Line
  - Goryōkaku - Kikonai 37.8 km (23.5 mi) transferred to South Hokkaido Railway Company on 26 March 2016.
  - Kikonai - Esashi 42.1 km (26.2 mi) closed on 12 May 2014.
- Hakodate Main Line branch
  - Sunagawa - Kami-Sunagawa 7.3 km (4.5 mi) closed on 16 May 1994.
- Horonai Line
  - Iwamizawa - Ikushumbetsu 18.1 km (11.2 mi) and Mikasa - Horonai 2.7 km (1.7 mi) closed on 13 July 1987.
- Matsumae Line
  - Kikonai - Matsumae 50.8 km (31.6 mi) closed on 1 February 1988.
- Nayoro Main Line
  - Nayoro - Engaru 138.1 km (85.8 mi) and Naka-Yūbetsu - Yūbetsu 4.9 km (3.0 mi) closed on 1 May 1989.
- Nemuro Main Line
  - Furano - Shintoku 81.7 km (50.8 mi) closed on 1 April 2024.
- Rumoi Main Line
  - Rumoi - Mashike 16.7 km (10.4 mi) closed on 4 December 2016.
  - Ishikari-Numata - Rumoi 35.7 km (22.2 mi) closed on 1 April 2023.
  - Fukagawa - Ishikari-Numata 14.4 km (8.9 mi) closed on 1 April 2026.
- Shibetsu Line
  - Shibecha - Nemuro-Shibetsu 69.4 km (43.1 mi) and Naka-Shibetsu - Attoko 47.5 km (29.5 mi) closed on 30 April 1989.
- Shinmei Line
  - Fukagawa - Nayoro 121.8 km (75.7 mi) closed on 4 September 1995.
- Tempoku Line
  - Otoineppu - Minami-Wakkanai 148.9 km (92.5 mi) closed on 1 May 1989.
- Utashinai Line
  - Sunagawa - Utashinai 14.5 km (9.0 mi) closed on 25 April 1988.
- Sekishō Line
  - Yūbari - Shin-Yūbari 16.1 km (10.0 mi) closed on 31 March 2019.
- Sasshō Line
  - Hokkaidō-Iryōdaigaku - Shin-Totsukawa 47.6 km (29.6 mi) closed on 17 April 2020.

The company also operated the Seikan Ferry until 1988.

=== Former JNR lines closed before JR Hokkaido formation ===
These lines have been closed by JNR in Hokkaido before 1 April 1987.

- Aioi Line
  - Bihoro - Kitami-Aioi 36.8 km (22.9 mi) closed on 1 April 1985
- Bikō Line
  - Bifuka - Niupu 21.2 km (13.2 mi) closed on 17 September 1985
- Haboro Line
  - Rumoi - Horonobe 141.1 km (87.7 mi) closed on 30 March 1987
- Hiroo Line
  - Obihiro - Hiroo 84.0 km (52.2 mi) closed on 2 February 1987
- Iburi Line
  - Kutchan - Datemombetsu 83.0 km (51.6 mi) and Kyōgoku - Wakikata 7.5 km (4.7 mi) closed on 11 November 1986
- Iwanai Line
  - Kozawa - Iwanai 14.9 km (9.3 mi) closed on 1 September 1985
- Kōhin'hoku Line
  - Hama-Tombetsu - Kitami-Esashi 30.4 km (18.9 mi) closed on 1 July 1985
- Kōhin'nan Line
  - Ōmu - Okoppe 19.9 km (12.4 mi) closed on 15 July 1985
- Konpoku Line
  - Shiretoko-Shari - Koshikawa 12.8 km (8.0 mi) closed on 1 December 1970
- Manji Line
  - Shibun - Manji-Tanzan 23.8 km (14.8 mi) closed on 1 April 1985
- Setana Line
  - Kunnui - Setana 48.4 km (30.1 mi) closed on 16 March 1987
- Shihoro Line
  - Obihiro - Tokachi-Mitsumata 78.3 km (48.7 mi) closed on 23 March 1987
- Shiranuka Line
  - Shiranuka - Hokushin 33.1 km (20.6 mi) closed on 23 October 1983
- Shokotsu Line
  - Shokotsu - Kitami-Takinoue 34.3 km (21.3 mi) closed on 1 April 1985
- Temiya Line
  - Minami-Otaru - Temiya 2.8 km (1.7 mi) closed on 5 November 1985
- Tomiuchi Line
  - Mukawa - Hidakachō 82.5 km (51.3 mi) closed on 1 November 1986
- Yūmō Line
  - Naka-Yūbetsu - Abashiri 121.8 km (75.7 mi) closed on 20 March 1987
- Sasshō Line
  - Shin-Totsukawa - Ishikari-Numata 34.9 km (21.7 mi) closed on 19 June 1972

Limited Express Services

Hokuto

Sapporo - Hakodate

Tokachi

Sapporo - Obihiro

Ozora

Sapporo - Kushiro

Okhotsk

Sapporo - Abashiri

Soya

Sapporo - Wakkanai

Suzuran

Sapporo - Muroran

Kamui & Lilac

Sapporo - Asahikawa

Sarobetsu

Asahikawa - Wakkanai

== Rolling stock ==
=== Electric multiple units ===
==== Shinkansen ====
- H5 Series Shinkansen

==== Commuter ====
- 721 series
- 731 series
- 733 series
- 735 series
- 737 series

==== Limited express ====
- 785 series – used on Kamui and Suzuran services
- 789 series
  - 789-0 – used on Lilac services
  - 789-1000 – used on Kamui and Suzuran services

=== Diesel multiple units ===
==== Commuter ====
- H100 series
- KiHa 54 series
- KiHa 150 series
- KiHa 201 series

==== Limited express ====
- KiHa 261 series
  - 261-0 – used on Sōya and Sarobetsu services
  - 261-1000 – used on Tokachi, Hokuto, and Ōzora services
- KiHa 283 series – used on Okhotsk services
