= Nayoro Station =

Railway station in Nayoro, Hokkaido, Japan

W48 Nayoro Station 名寄駅
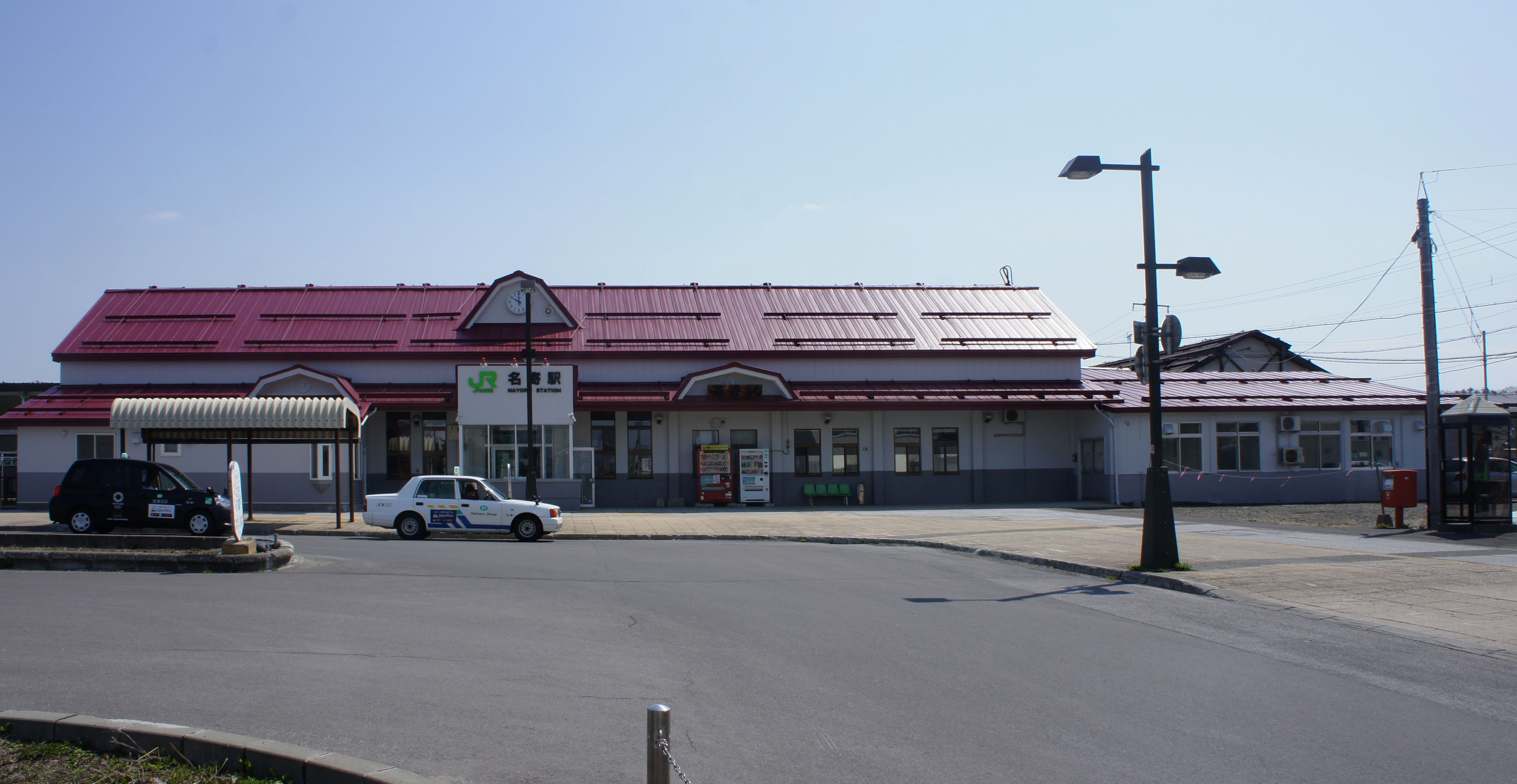
- Nayoro Station, April 2019

General information
- Location: 6 Chome Higashi 1 Jominami, Nayoro-shi, Hokkaido 096-0001; Japan
- Coordinates: 44°20′58″N 142°27′55″E
- System: regional rail
- Operator: JR Hokkaido
- Line: Sōya Main Line
- Distance: 76.2 km (47.3 mi) from Asahikawa
- Platforms: 1 side + 1 island platform
- Train operators: JR Hokkaido

Construction
- Structure type: At grade

Other information
- Status: Staffed (Midori no Madoguchi)
- Station code: W48
- Website: Official website

History
- Opened: 3 September 1903

Passengers
- FY2023: 468 (daily)

Services
Preceding station	JR Hokkaido	Following station
Nisshin towards Wakkanai	Sōya Main Line Local	Nayorokōkō towards Asahikawa
Terminus	Sōya Main Line Limited Express Nayoro	Nayorokōkō towards Asahikawa
Bifuka towards Wakkanai	Sōya Main Line Limited Express Sarobetsu	Shibetsu towards Asahikawa
Bifuka towards Wakkanai	Sōya Main Line Limited Express Sōya	Shibetsu towards Asahikawa
Location
- Location within Hokkaido Location within Japan

Nayoro Station (名寄駅, Nayoro-eki) is a railway station located in the city of Nayoro, Hokkaidō, Japan. It is operated by JR Hokkaido. It is also the location a freight depot of the Japan Freight Railway Company (JR Freight).

== Lines ==
The station is served by the 259.4 km (161.2 mi) Soya Main Line from Asahikawa to Wakkanai and is located 76.2 km from the starting point of the line at Asahikawa.

== Layout ==
The station is an above-ground station with one side platform and one island platform, connected by a footbridge The station building is located on the west side. Previously, there was another island platform directly connected to the side of the station building, but after platform 0 was abolished, it became a side platform. The station is staffed and has a Midori no Madoguchi staffed ticket office.

=== Platforms ===
1-3	■ Sōya Main Line	for Otoineppu and Wakkanai for Asahikawa and Sapporo

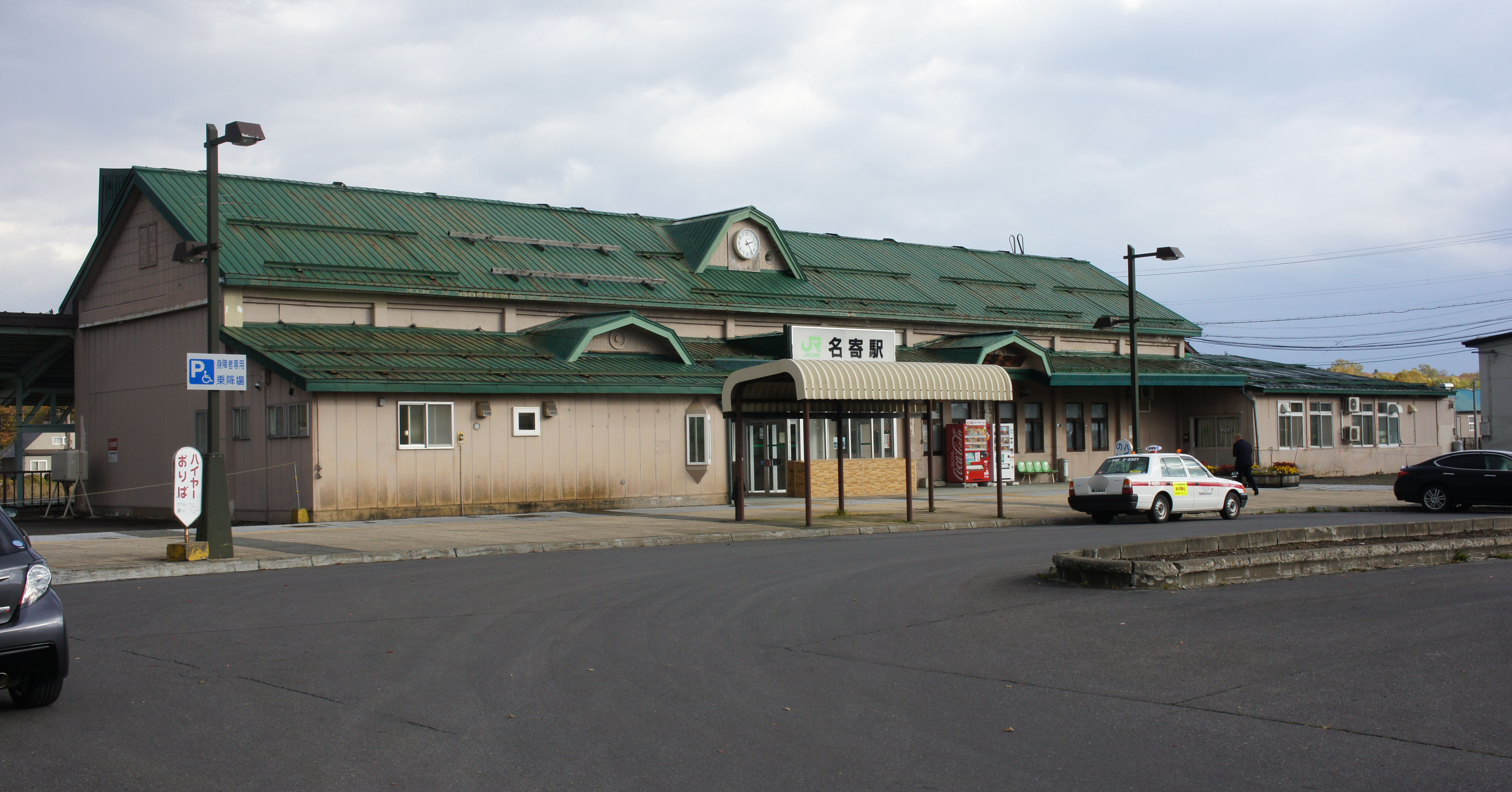
Station before renovation

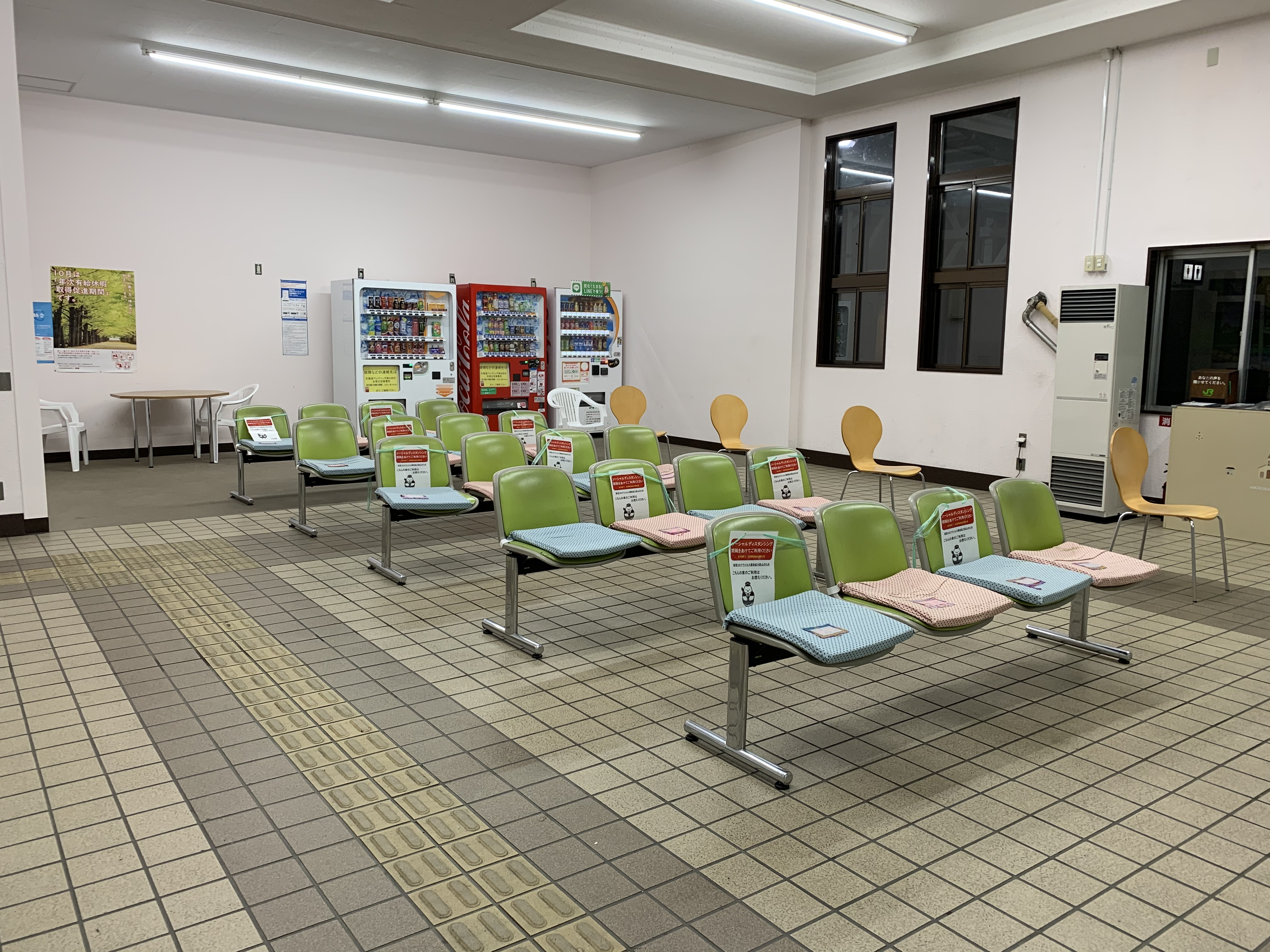
Waiting room

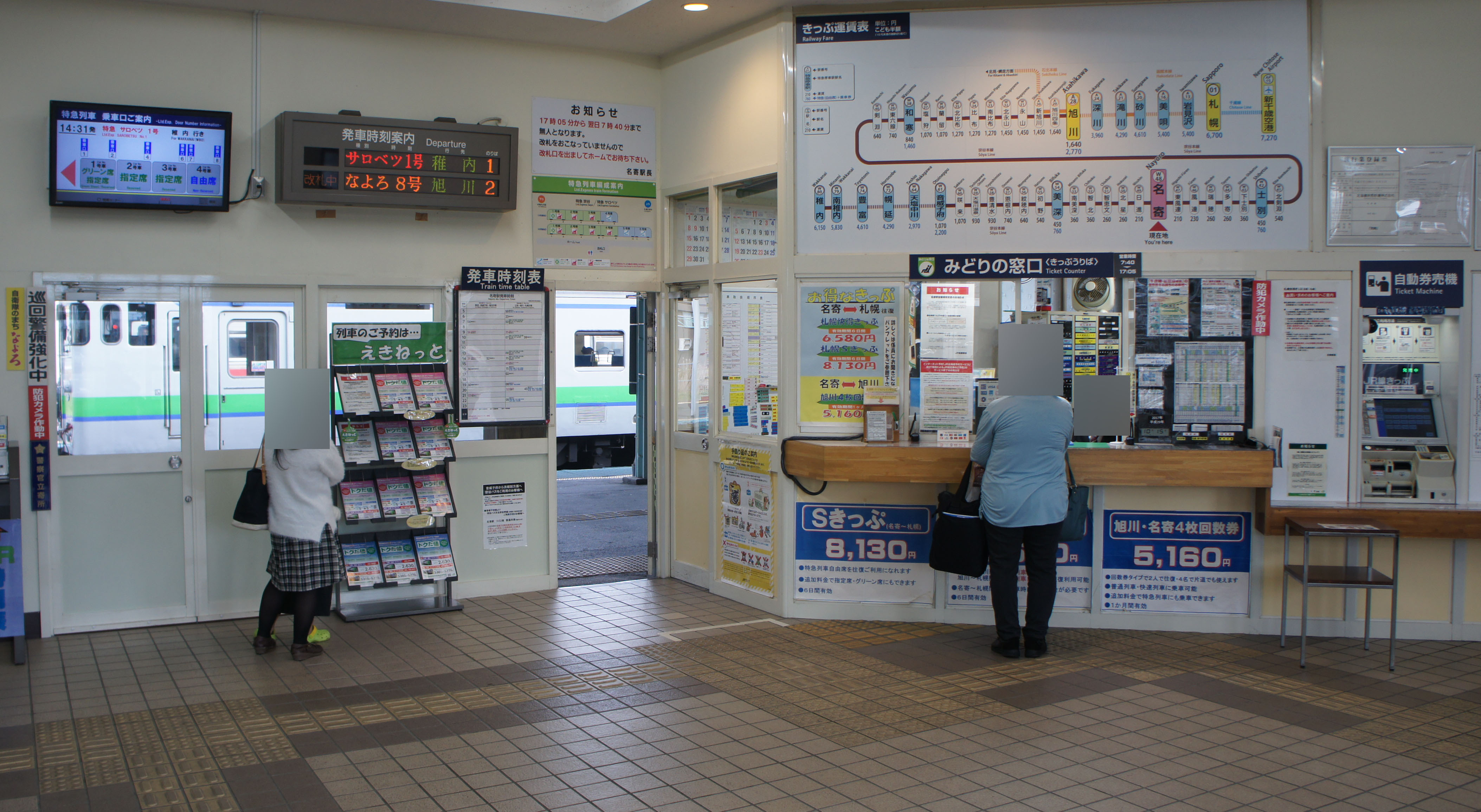
ticket gates

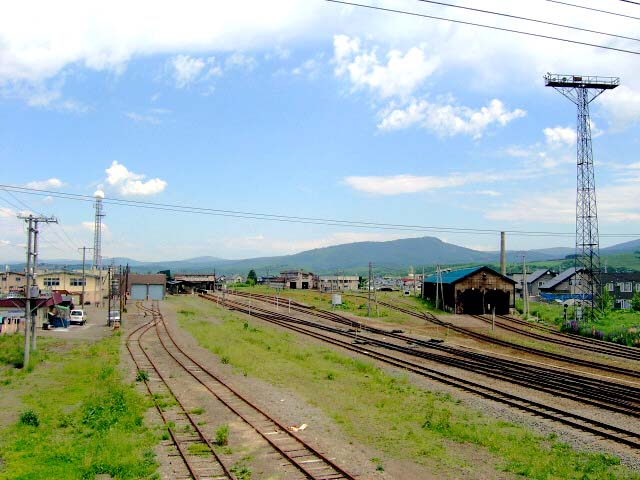
Station interior

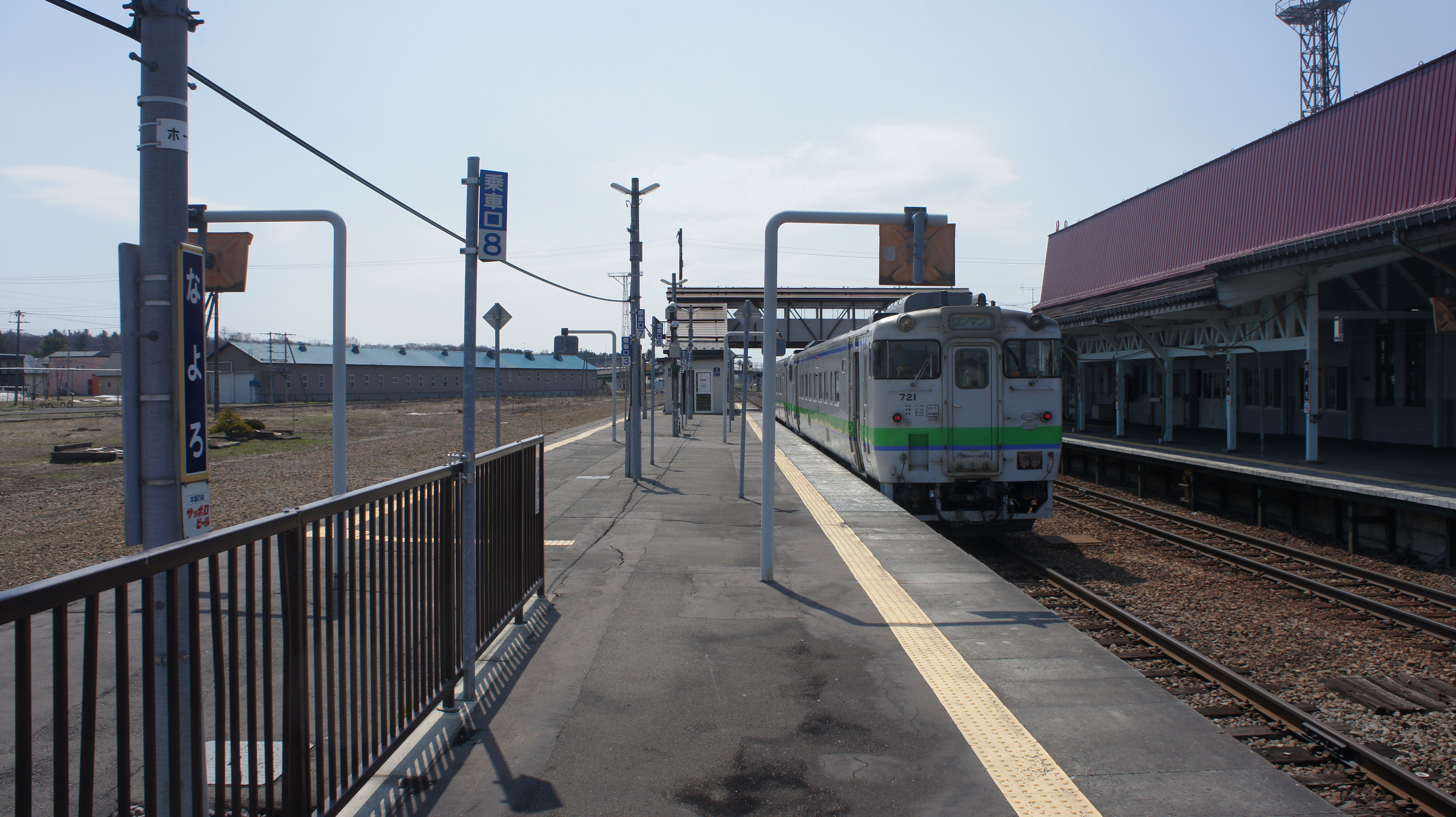
Platform

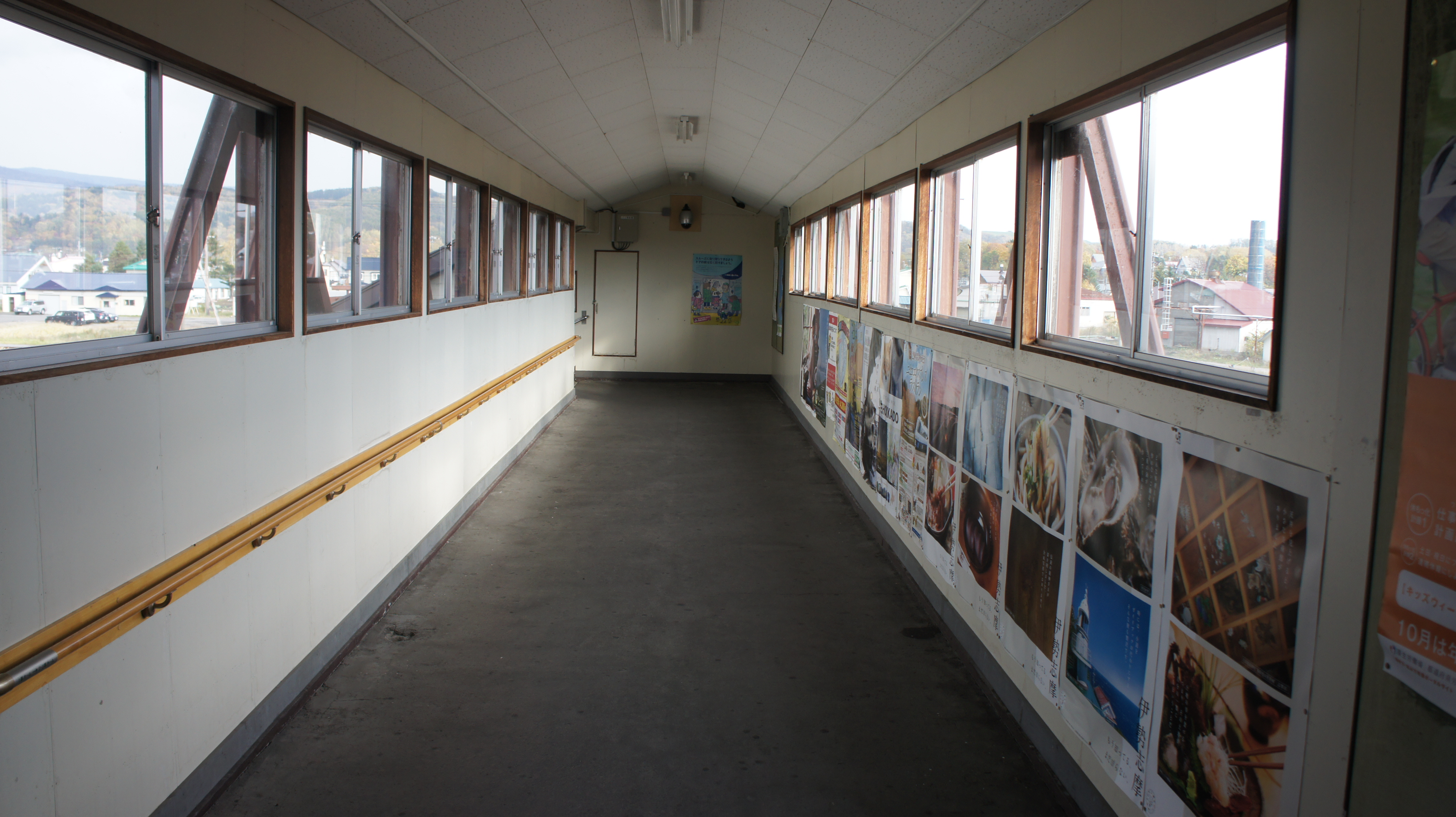
Footbridge

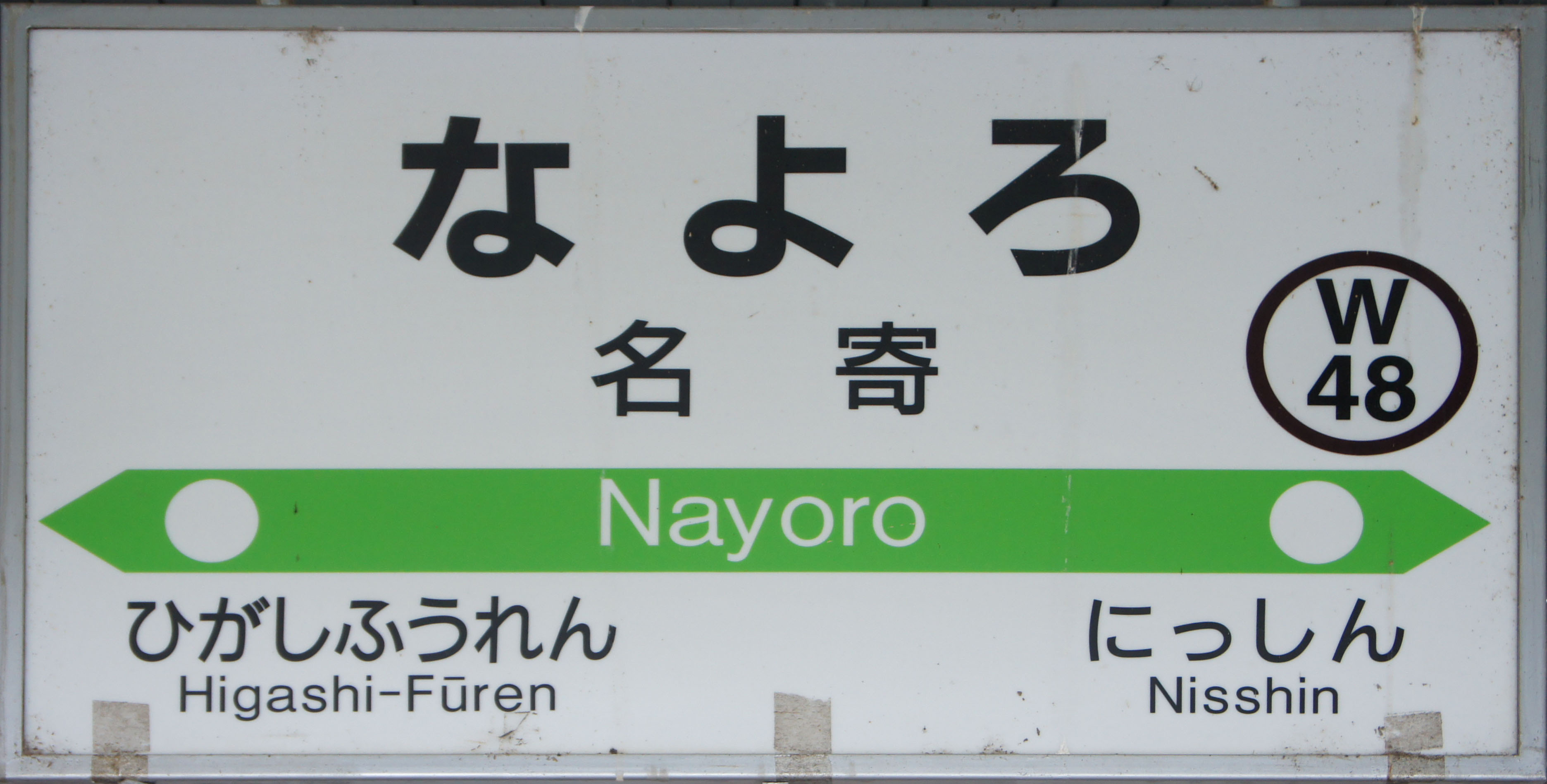
Signage

== History ==
The station was opened on 3 September 1903 as the terminus of the extension of the Hokkaido Government Railway Teshio Line from Shibetsu. With the privatization of Japanese National Railways (JNR) on 1 April 1987, the station came under the control of JR Hokkaido. The station building was renovated in 2018.

== Passenger statistics ==
During FY2023, the station was used on average by 468 passengers daily. (Note: Data published by the Ministry of Land, Infrastructure, Transport and Tourism state the number of passengers boarding and disembarking by station in a given year. FY2023 covers the period from 1 April 2023 to 31 March 2024. Data published by individual railways directly may state the number boarding only.)

== Surrounding area ==
- Hokkaido Prefectural Highway 540
- Nayoro City Hall

== See also ==
- List of railway stations in Japan
