= Wakkanai Station =

Railway station in Wakkanai, Hokkaido, Japan

W80 Wakkanai Station 稚内駅
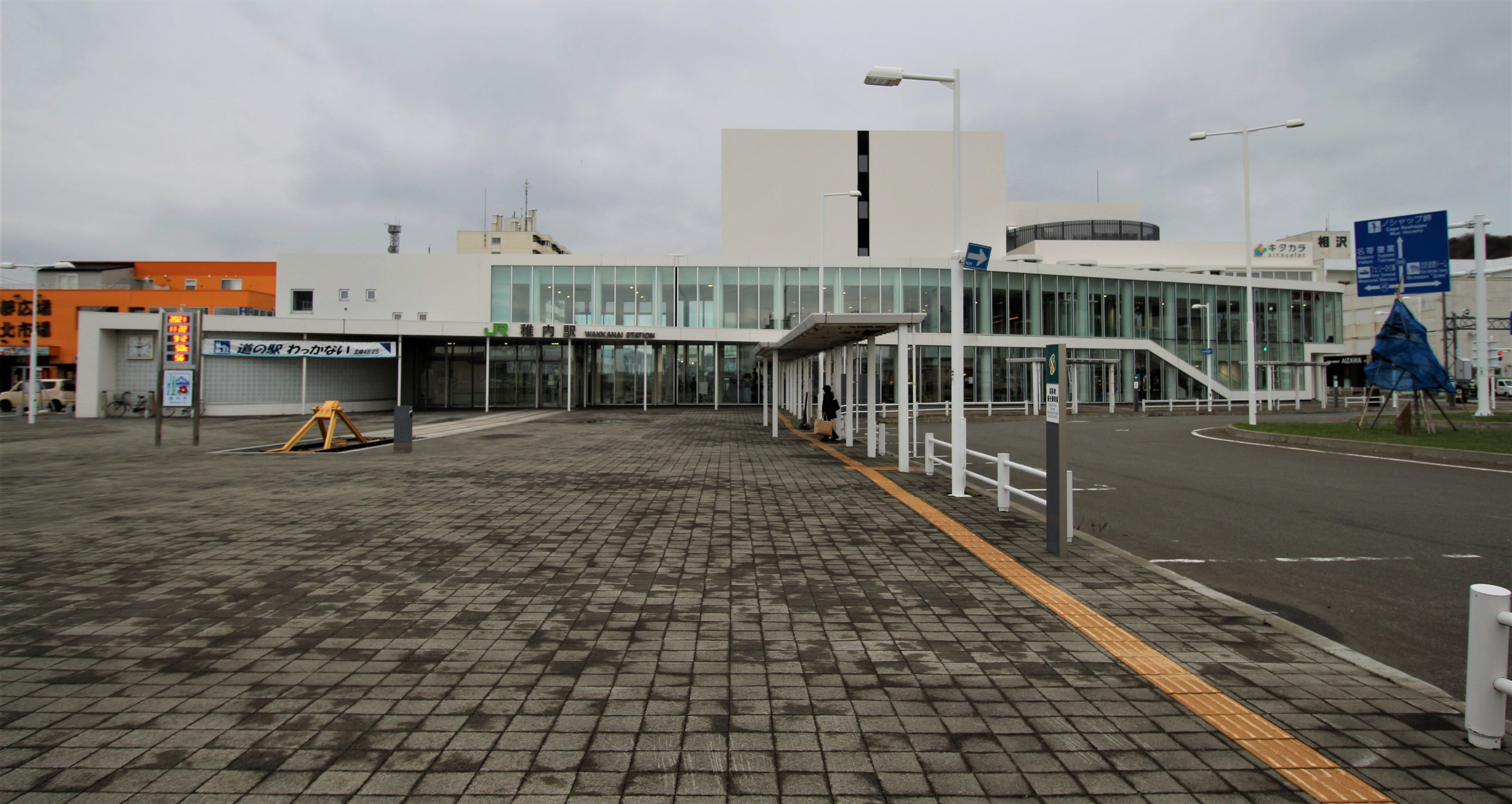
- Wakkanai Station, November 2021

General information
- Location: 3–6-1 Chuo, Wakkanai-shi, Hokkaidō 097-0022; Japan
- Coordinates: 45°25′1.3″N 141°40′37.2″E
- System: regional rail
- Operator: JR Hokkaido
- Line: Sōya Main Line
- Distance: 259.4 km (161.2 mi) from Asahikawa
- Platforms: 1 side platform
- Tracks: 1

Construction
- Structure type: At grade

Other information
- Status: Staffed (Midori no Madoguchi)
- Station code: W80
- Website: Official website

History
- Opened: 26 December 1928
- Rebuilt: 2011
- Former names: Wakkanai Minato (until 1939)

Passengers
- FY2023: 114 (daily)

Services
Preceding station	JR Hokkaido	Following station
Terminus	Sōya Main Line Local	Minami-Wakkanai W79 towards Asahikawa
Terminus	Sōya Main Line Sōya / Sarobetsu	Minami-Wakkanai W79 towards Asahikawa
Location
- Location within Hokkaido Location within Japan

Wakkanai Station (稚内駅, Wakkanai-eki) is a railway station located in the city of Wakkanai, Hokkaidō, Japan. It is operated by JR Hokkaido. It is the northernmost railway station in Japan. The station is numbered "W80".

== Lines ==
Wakkanai Station is the northern terminus of the 259.4 km (161.2 mi) Sōya Main Line from Asahikawa.

== Layout ==
Wakkanai Station is an above-ground station with one side platform and one track. Previously, it had one island platform and two tracks, but on 30 January 2010, the second track was abolished, and the tracks, switches, departure signals, and in-house signals were removed, and the train stops and rails that were previously used were donated by JR Hokkaido to Wakkanai City, to create a monument in the station square. The passage from the ticket gate to the platform is a slope, making the station barrier-free. The station has a Midori no Madoguchi staffed ticket office. The station building was renewed in 2011.

=== Platforms ===
1	■ Sōya Main Line	for Asahikawa and Sapporo

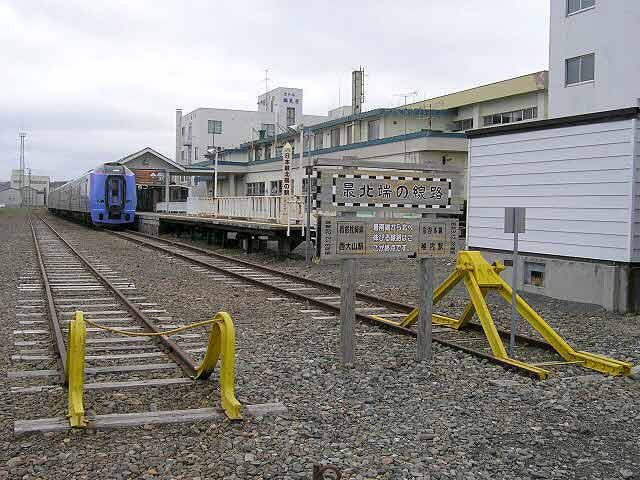
The station platform before renewal in May 2005

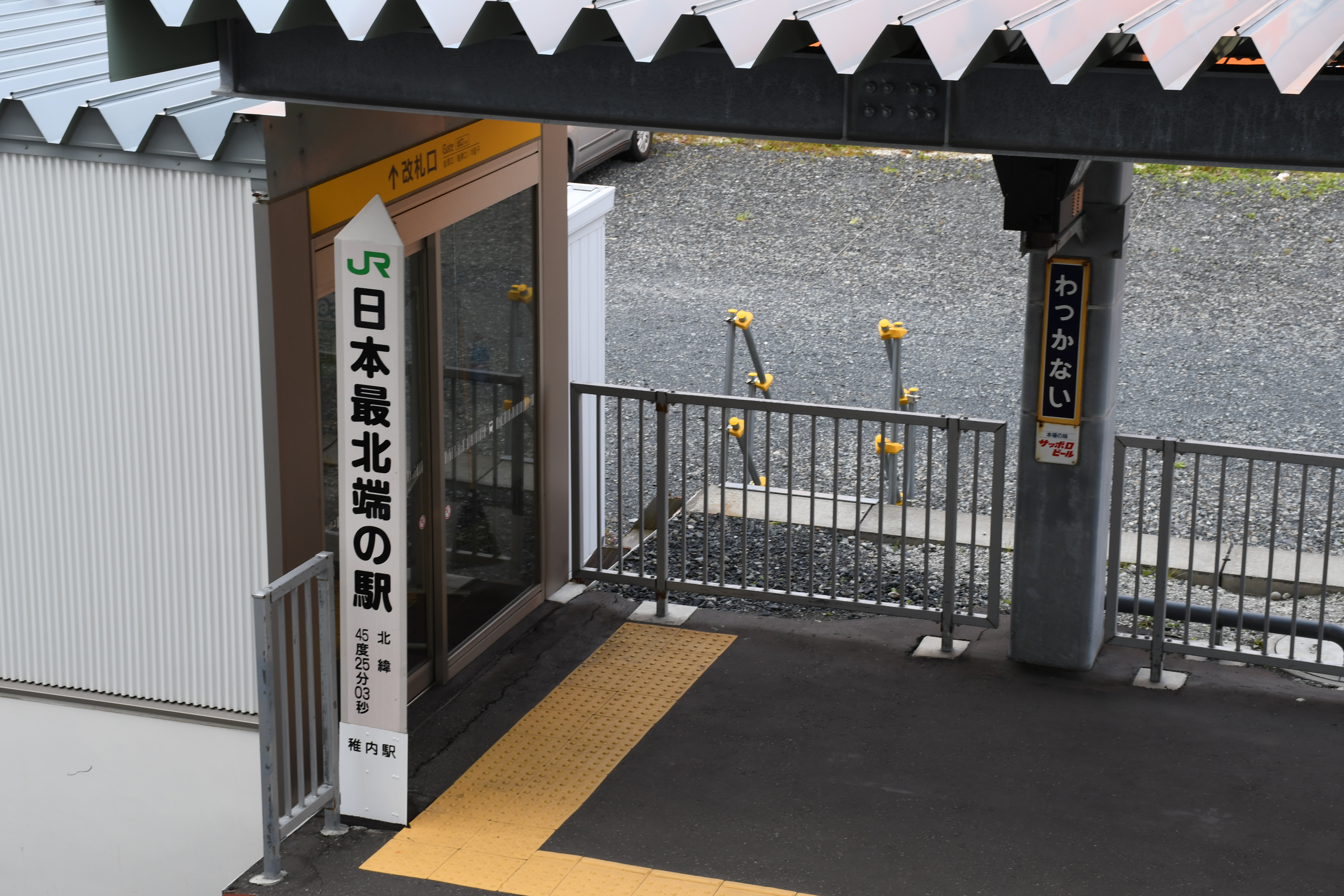
Marker on the platform showing the station as the northernmost station in Japan. (July 2018)

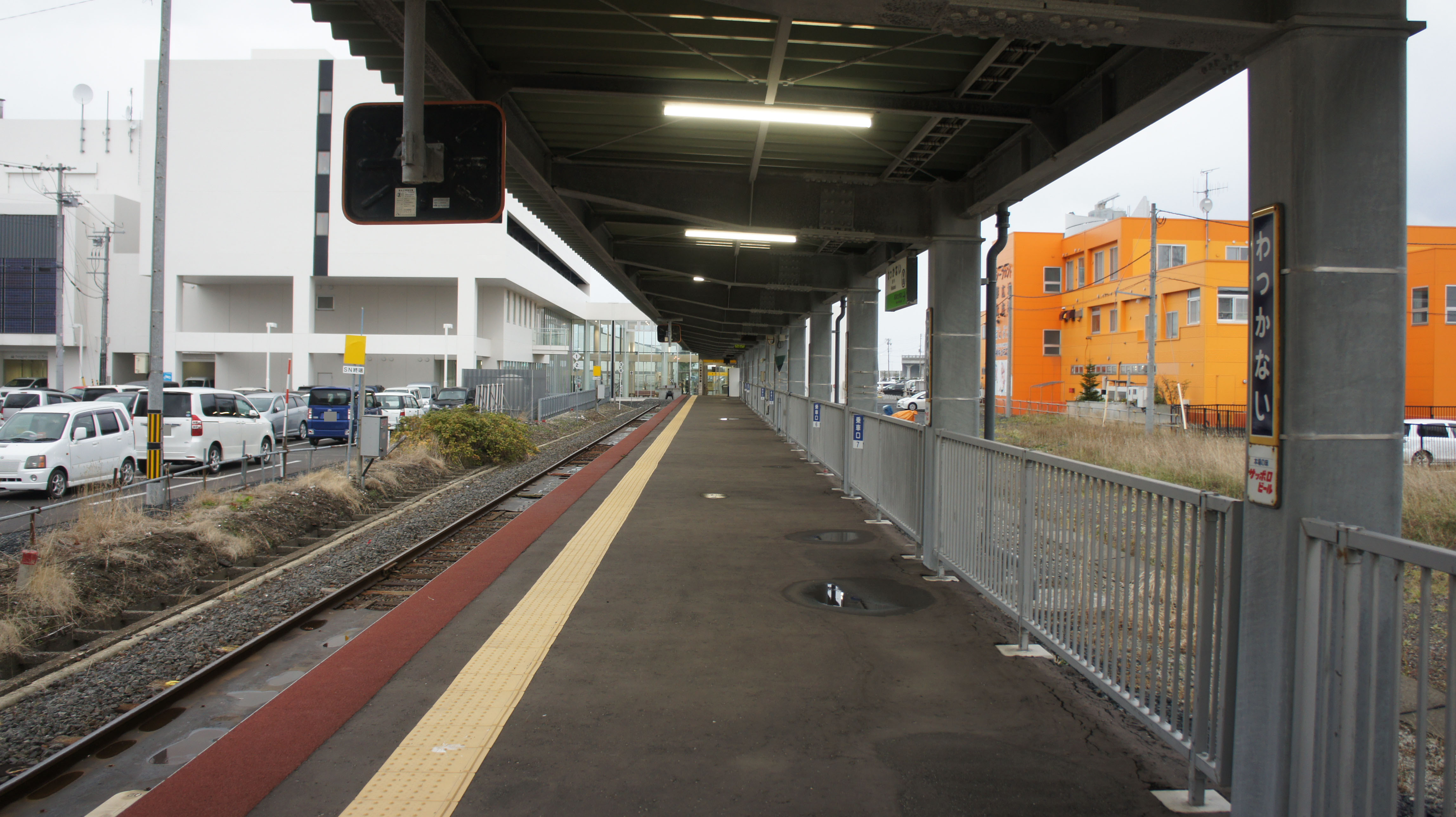
Station platform and station structure in the back, October 2017.

== History ==
The station opened on 26 December 1926, initially named Wakkanai Minato Station (稚内港駅; lit. "Wakkanai Port Station") on the Teshio Line. On April 1, 1930 the Teshio Line was incorporated into the Sōya Main Line. It was renamed Wakkanai on 1 February 1939 at the same time as the original Wakkanai Station was renamed Minami-Wakkanai Station. With the privatization of Japanese National Railways (JNR) on 1 April 1987, the station then became under the control of JR Hokkaido.

== Passenger statistics ==
In FY2023, the station was used by an average of 114 passengers daily. (Note: Data published by the Ministry of Land, Infrastructure, Transport and Tourism state the number of passengers boarding and disembarking by station in a given year. FY2023 covers the period from 1 April 2023 to 31 March 2024. Data published by individual railways directly may state the number boarding only.)

== In culture ==
Wakkanai Station was used as a terminus for season nineteen of the game show Jet Lag: The Game.

== Surrounding area ==
- Port of Wakkanai
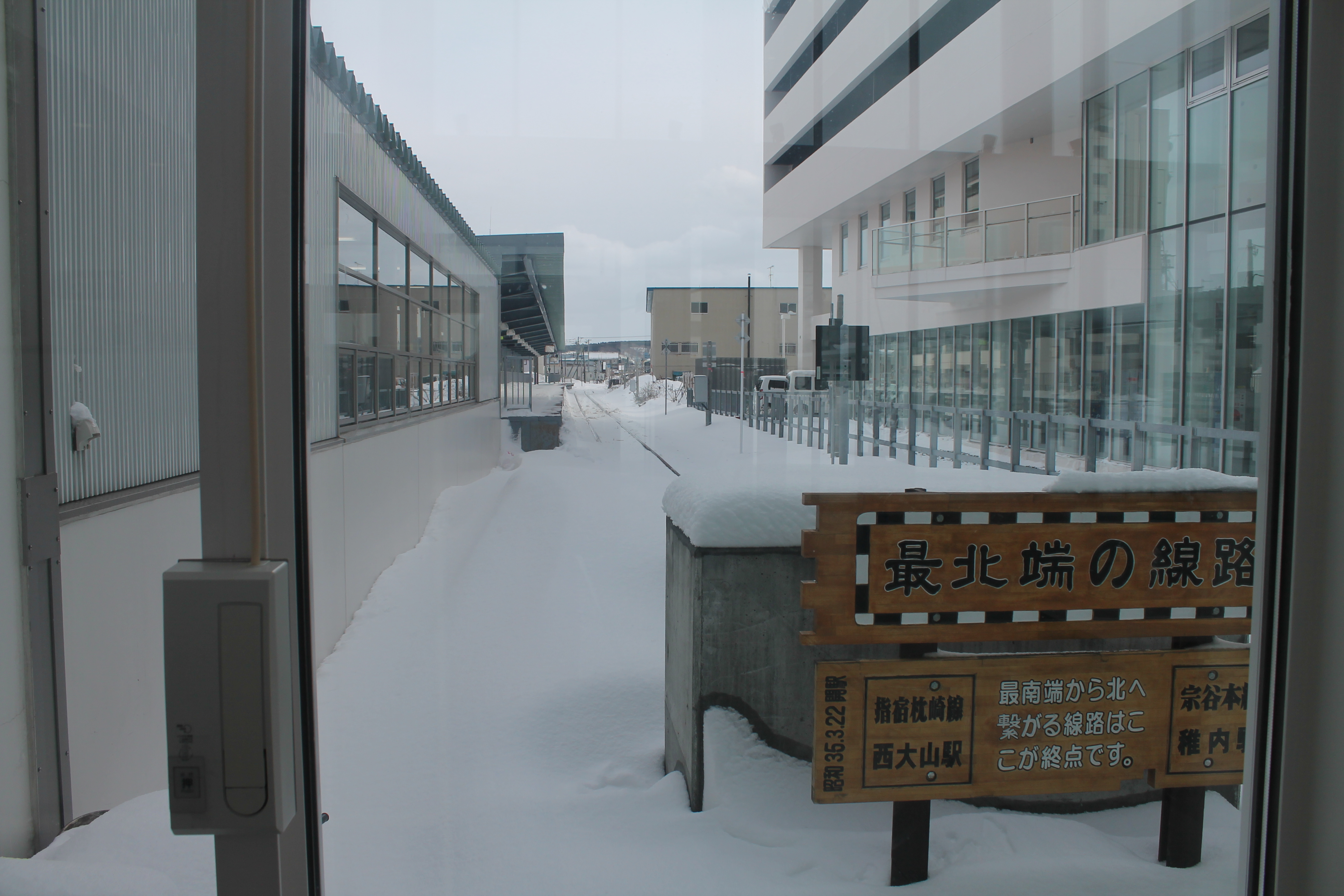
Terminating tracks in the snow, April 2014

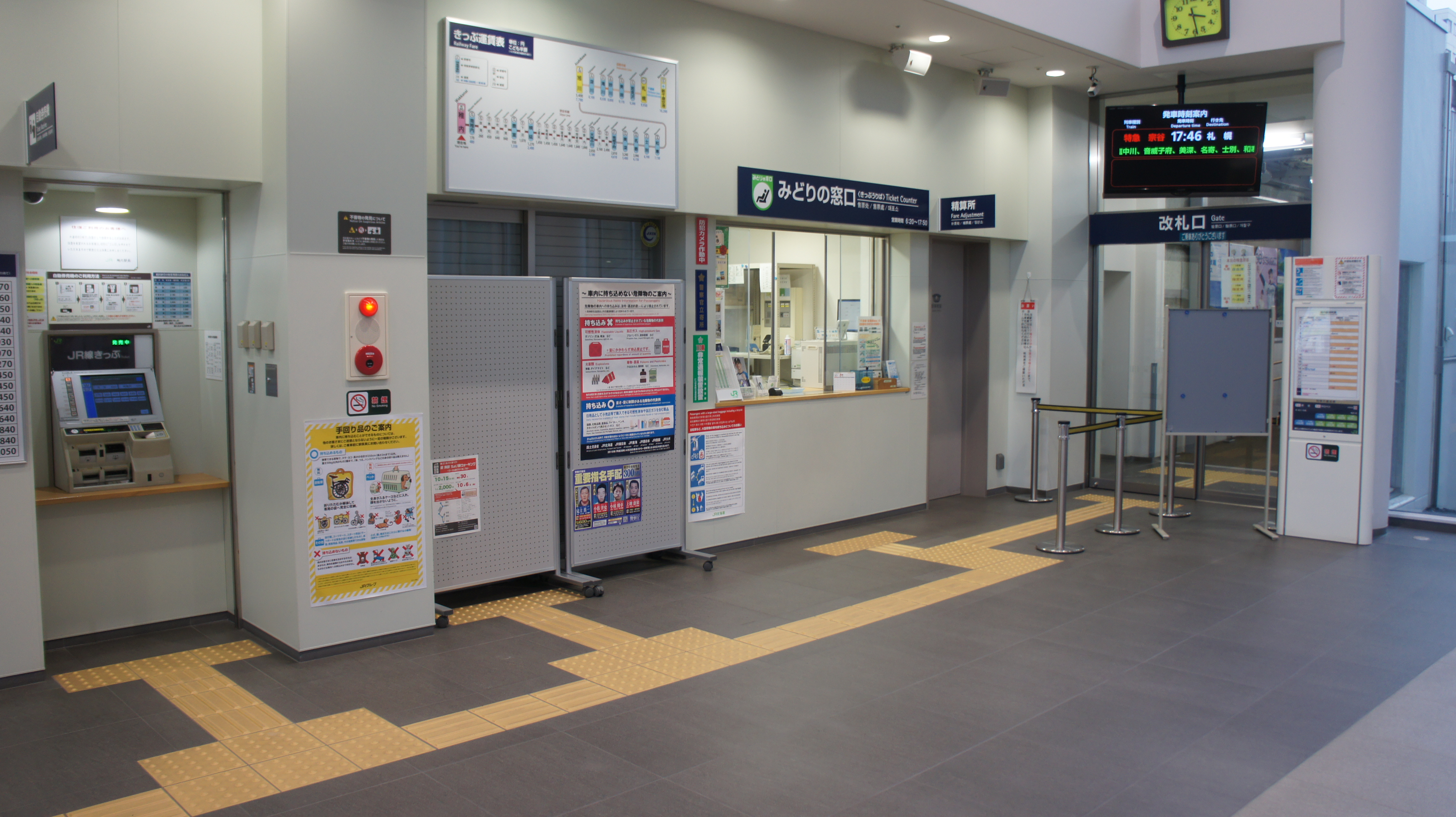
Fare gates and ticket office, October 2017

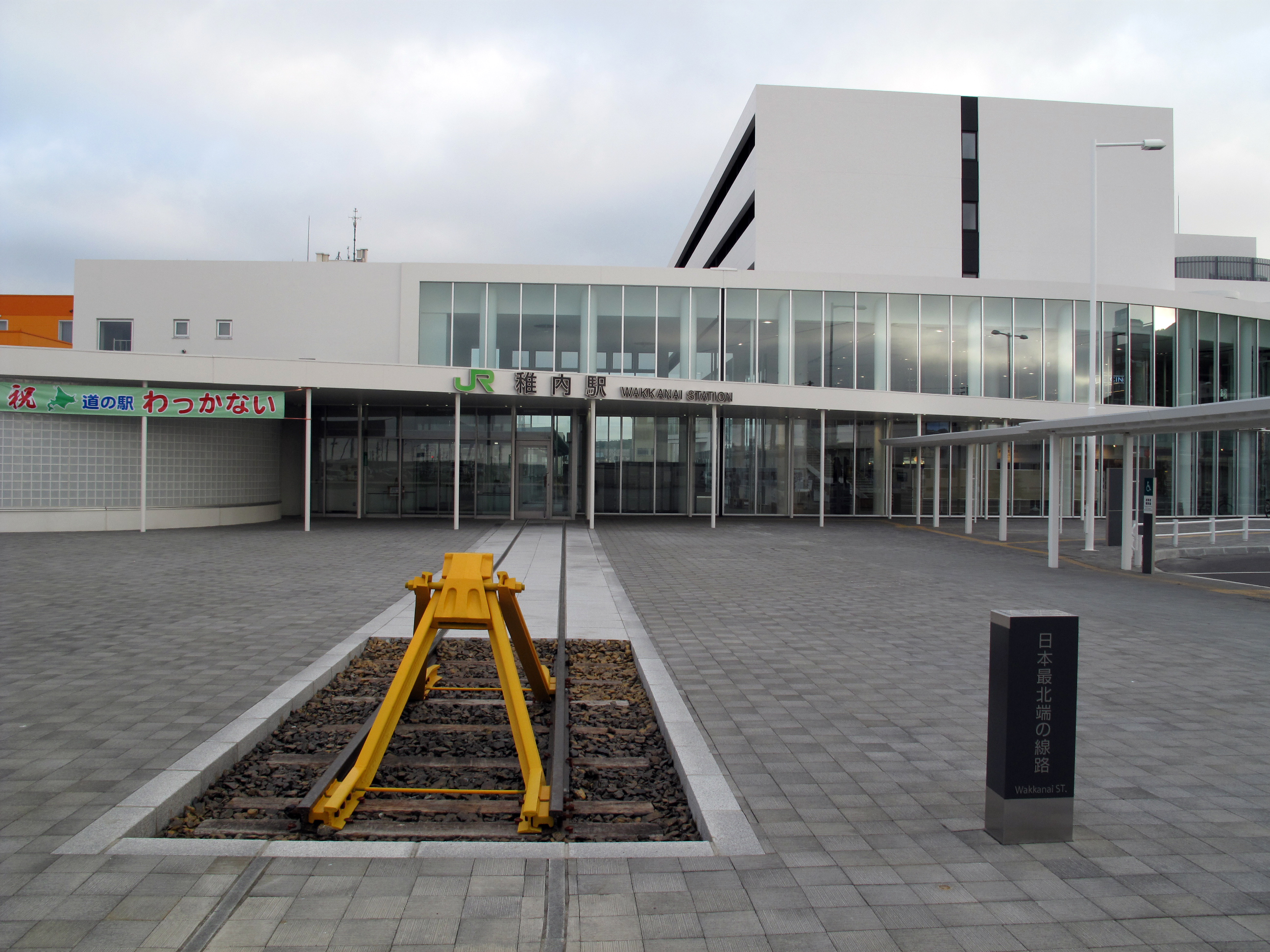
Wakkanai Station in June 2012

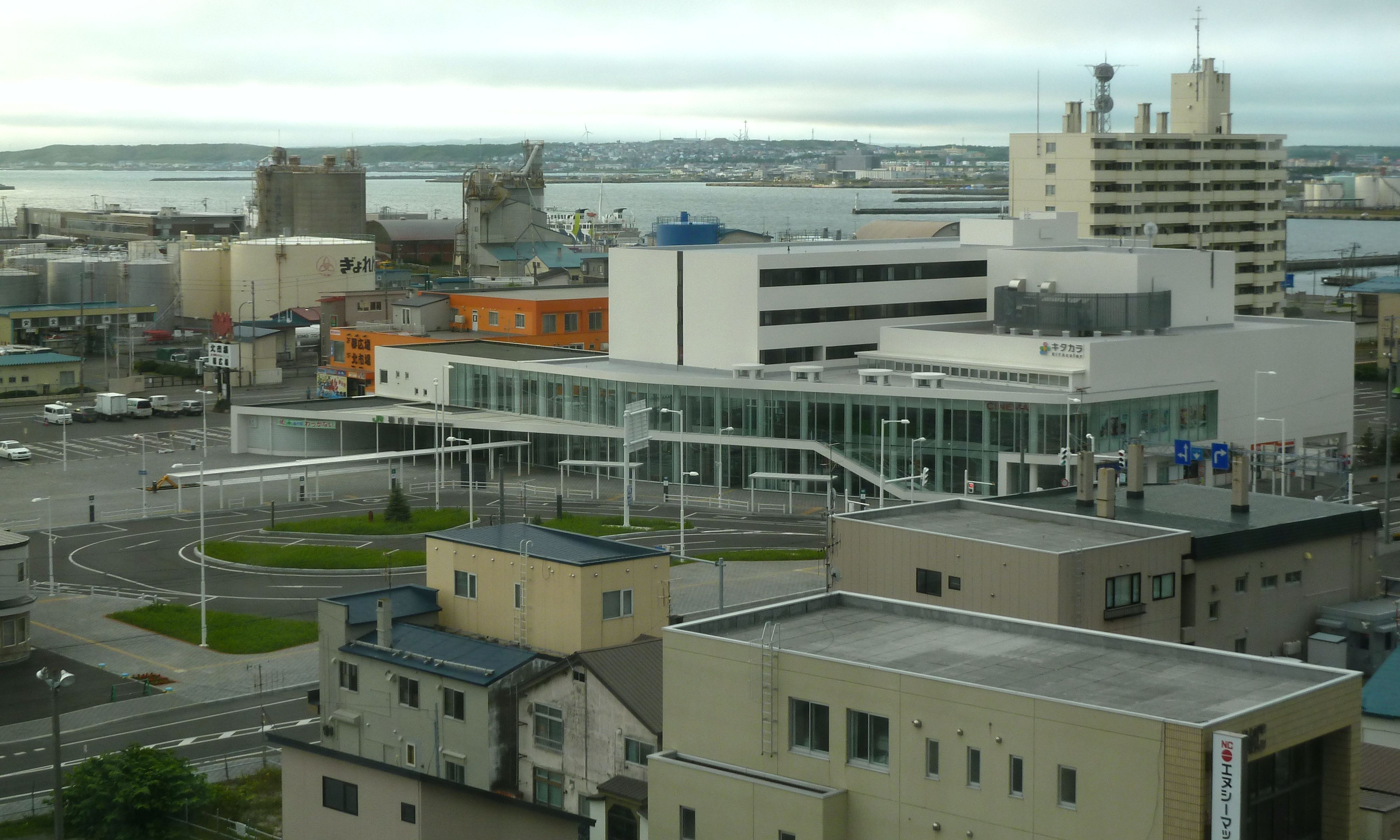
View of the surrounding area of the station, July 2012

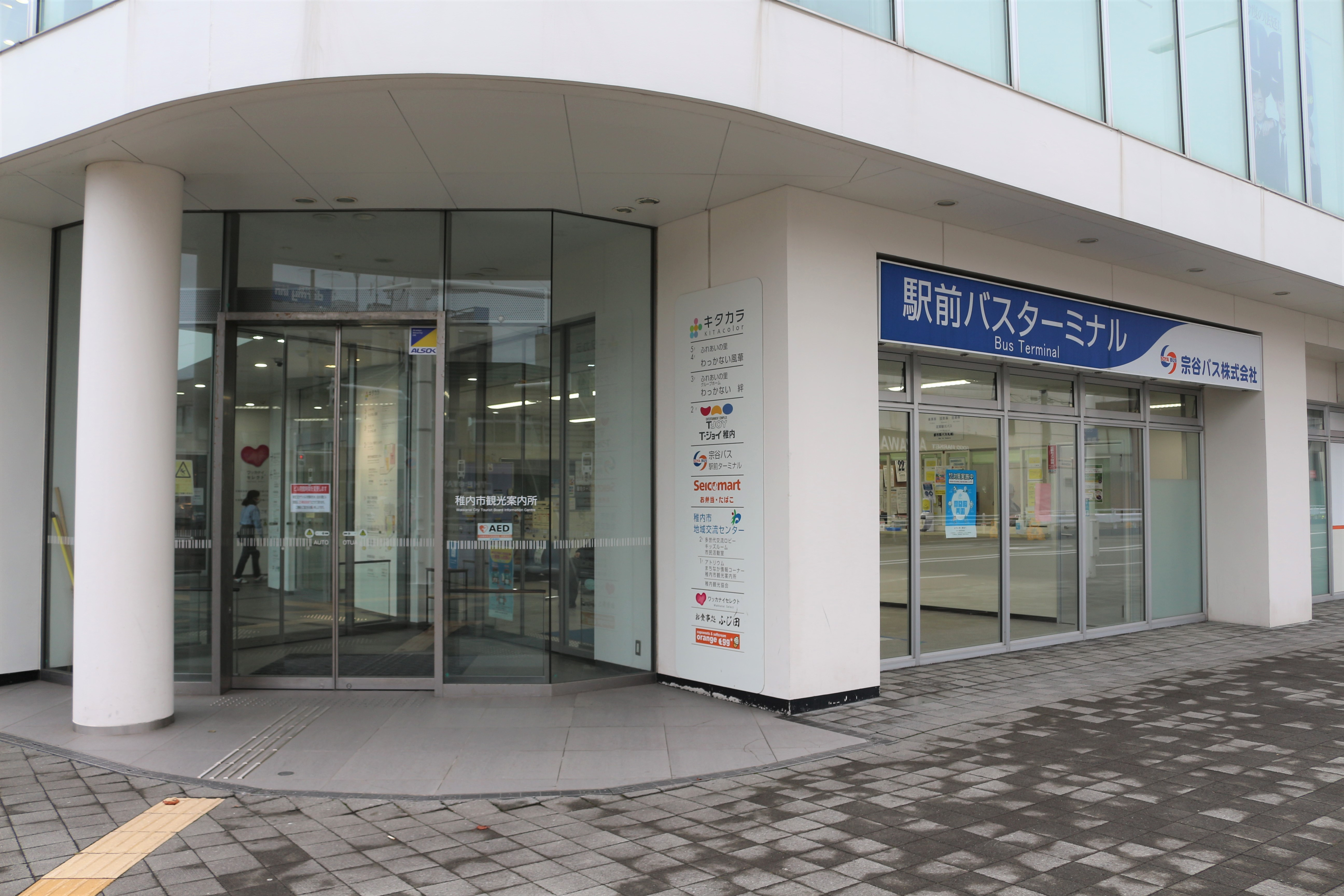
Adjacent bus terminal, November 2021

== See also ==
- List of railway stations in Japan

== In Popular Culture ==
This station was featured as the end destination in Jet Lag: The Game Season 19, where the two teams went from Nishi-Ōyama Station to Wakkanai while having to unlock prefectures through challenges
