= Shibetsu (city) =

Shibetsu 士別市
- City
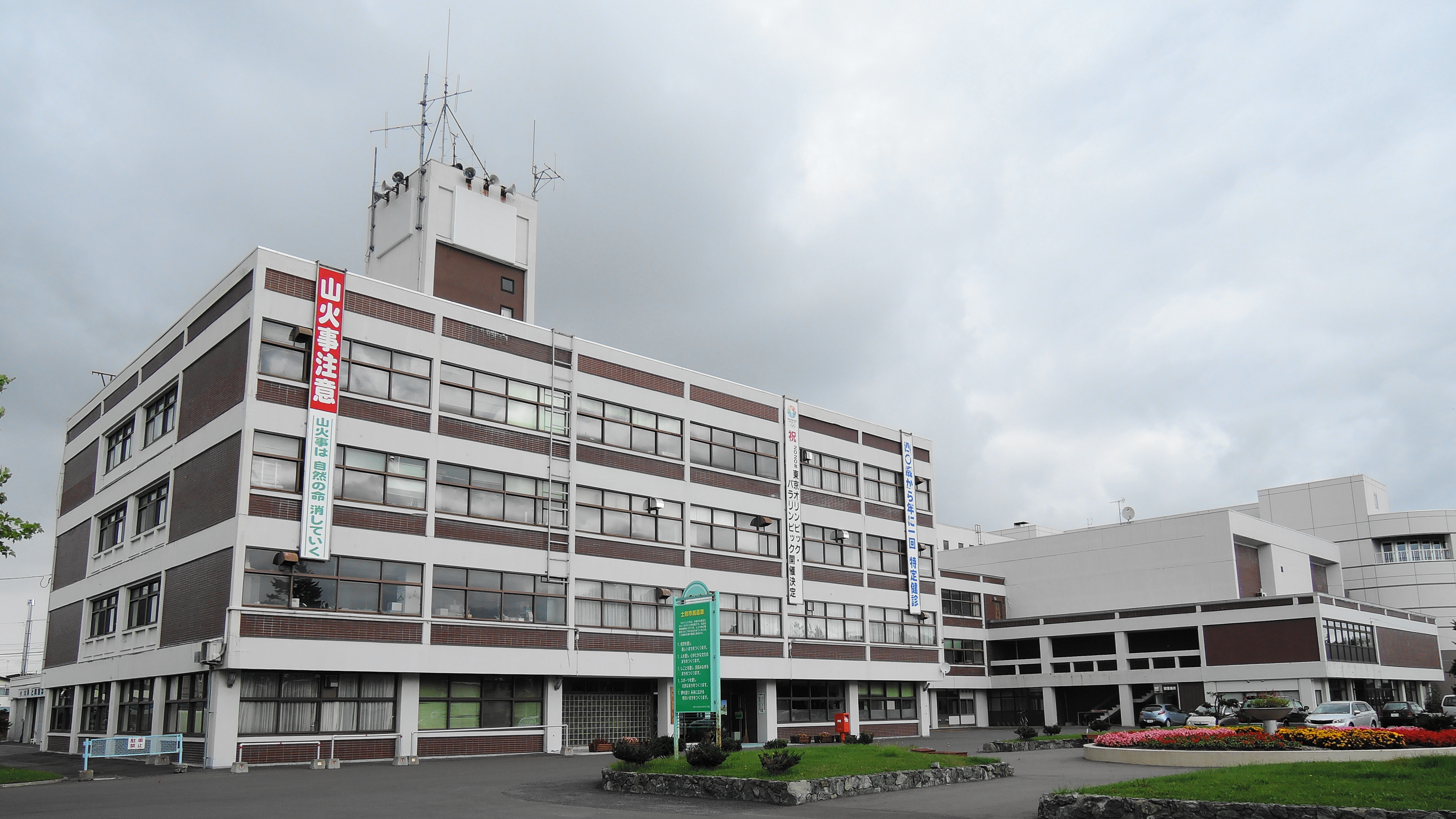
- Shibetsu city hall

- Flag Seal
- Location of Shibetsu in Hokkaido (Kamikawa Subprefecture)

- Location in Japan
- Coordinates: 44°10′37.022″N 142°23′34.652″E
- Country: Japan
- Region: Hokkaido
- Prefecture: Hokkaido (Kamikawa Subprefecture)

Government
  - Mayor: Eiji Watanabe

Area
  - Total: 1,119.22 km^{2} (432.13 sq mi)

Population (January 31, 2025)
  - Total: 16,400
  - Density: 14.7/km^{2} (38.0/sq mi)
- Time zone: UTC+09:00 (JST)
- City hall address: 4-1, Higashi Roku-jō, Shibetsu-shi, Hokkaidō 095-8686
- Climate: Dfb
- Website: Official website
- Symbols
- Flower: Cosmos and Ezo murasaki-tsutsuji (Rhododendron dauricum)
- Mascot: Sahocchi (さほっち), Mei-chan (メイちゃん), Mi-chan (みーちゃん) and Jumpun (ジャンプん)
- Tree: Japanese Rowan and Ezo Spruce

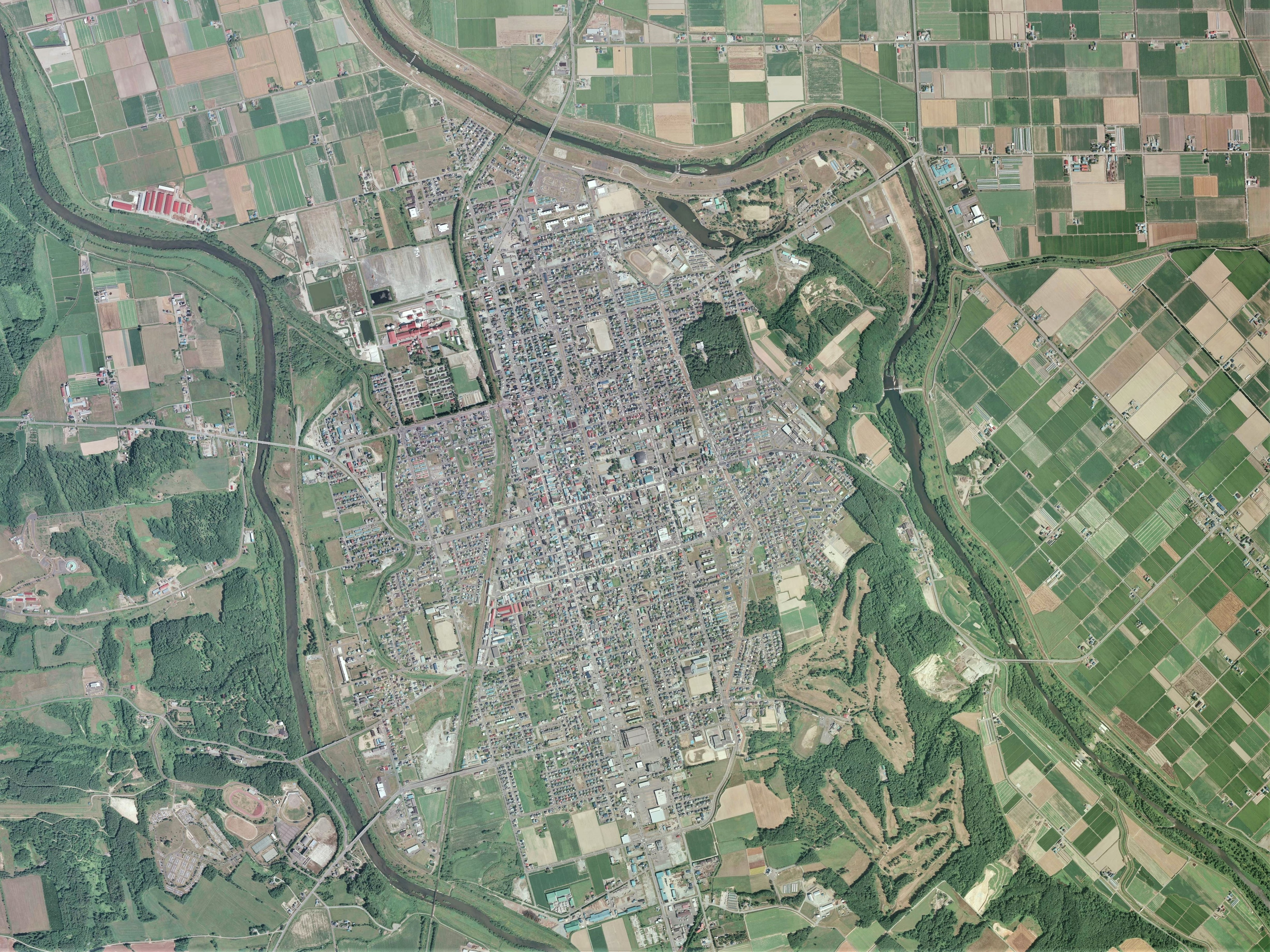
downtown Shibetsu

Shibetsu (士別市, Shibetsu-shi; Ainu: シペㇳ Sipet) is a city located in Kamikawa Subprefecture, Hokkaido, Japan. As of 31 December 2024, the city had an estimated population of 16,400 in 706 households, and a population density of 15 people per km^{2}. The total area of the city is 1,119.22 km^{2} (432.13 sq mi).

== Geography ==
Shibetsu is located N of Asahikawa and NNE of Sapporo. It is situated by the Shibetsu River in the north and its valley. The name comes from the Ainu word for "great river". The city center is located in the southern part of the Nayoro Basin, near the confluence of the Teshio River and the Kenbuchi River. The eastern part of the city is in the Kitami Mountains, while the Onnebetsu area in the west is mountainous land that continues into the Teshio Mountains. Lake Iwaonai, located in the eastern part of the city, is the uppermost reaches of the Teshio River.

=== Neighbouring municipalities ===
- Hokkaido
  - Nayoro
  - Wassamu
  - Kenbuchi
  - Shimokawa
  - Pippu
  - Kamikawa
  - Aibetsu
  - Horokanai
  - Takinoue

=== Demographics ===
Per Japanese census data, the population of Shibetsu is as shown below. The city is in a long period of sustained population loss.

Historical population
Year	Pop.	±%
1940	34,276	—
1950	42,913	+25.2%
1960	45,705	+6.5%
1970	38,145	−16.5%
1980	32,103	−15.8%
1990	28,162	−12.3%
2000	24,991	−11.3%
2010	21,797	−12.8%
2020	17,858	−18.1%

== Climate ==
Shibetsu has a humid continental climate (Köppen Dfb) characterized by cold summers and cold winters with heavy snowfall. The average annual temperature in Shibetsu is 5.5 °C. The average annual rainfall is 1281 mm with September as the wettest month. The temperatures are highest on average in August, at around 19.7 °C, and lowest in January, at around -8.6 °C.

Climate data for Shibetsu (elevation 135 m, 1991–2020 normals, extremes 1977–present)
Month	Jan	Feb	Mar	Apr	May	Jun	Jul	Aug	Sep	Oct	Nov	Dec	Year
Record high °C (°F)	6.8 (44.2)	11.8 (53.2)	14.4 (57.9)	26.6 (79.9)	32.8 (91.0)	36.3 (97.3)	36.2 (97.2)	37.0 (98.6)	31.8 (89.2)	26.6 (79.9)	19.9 (67.8)	11.1 (52.0)	37.0 (98.6)
Mean daily maximum °C (°F)	−4.3 (24.3)	−2.8 (27.0)	1.9 (35.4)	9.5 (49.1)	17.5 (63.5)	22.0 (71.6)	25.4 (77.7)	25.6 (78.1)	21.2 (70.2)	14.1 (57.4)	5.4 (41.7)	−1.8 (28.8)	11.2 (52.2)
Daily mean °C (°F)	−8.5 (16.7)	−7.7 (18.1)	−2.8 (27.0)	4.2 (39.6)	11.2 (52.2)	15.8 (60.4)	19.7 (67.5)	20.1 (68.2)	15.5 (59.9)	8.8 (47.8)	1.7 (35.1)	−5.2 (22.6)	6.1 (43.0)
Mean daily minimum °C (°F)	−14.5 (5.9)	−14.2 (6.4)	−8.5 (16.7)	−0.9 (30.4)	5.2 (41.4)	10.5 (50.9)	15.0 (59.0)	15.7 (60.3)	10.6 (51.1)	4.0 (39.2)	−1.9 (28.6)	−9.9 (14.2)	0.9 (33.6)
Record low °C (°F)	−35.1 (−31.2)	−34.2 (−29.6)	−28.9 (−20.0)	−13.0 (8.6)	−5.0 (23.0)	0.4 (32.7)	4.6 (40.3)	4.5 (40.1)	0.2 (32.4)	−6.4 (20.5)	−20.4 (−4.7)	−29.0 (−20.2)	−35.1 (−31.2)
Average precipitation mm (inches)	64.2 (2.53)	49.2 (1.94)	52.2 (2.06)	46.7 (1.84)	62.9 (2.48)	66.3 (2.61)	130.5 (5.14)	152.3 (6.00)	148.8 (5.86)	116.0 (4.57)	125.7 (4.95)	102.3 (4.03)	1,117.6 (44.00)
Average precipitation days (≥ 1.0 mm)	17.4	14.6	14.7	10.8	10.7	10.0	11.7	12.3	13.9	15.8	19.7	21.5	172.9
Mean monthly sunshine hours	47.6	75.0	117.2	159.3	189.8	168.4	162.6	152.2	147.2	114.6	48.0	31.8	1,410.1
Source: Japan Meteorological Agency (1991–2020 normals, extremes 1977–present)

Climate data for Asahi, Shibetsu (elevation 225 m, 1991–2020 normals, extremes 1977–present)
Month	Jan	Feb	Mar	Apr	May	Jun	Jul	Aug	Sep	Oct	Nov	Dec	Year
Record high °C (°F)	8.3 (46.9)	14.6 (58.3)	15.9 (60.6)	26.7 (80.1)	32.8 (91.0)	36.4 (97.5)	36.9 (98.4)	37.2 (99.0)	32.0 (89.6)	26.6 (79.9)	20.3 (68.5)	12.4 (54.3)	37.2 (99.0)
Mean daily maximum °C (°F)	−3.9 (25.0)	−2.8 (27.0)	1.8 (35.2)	9.4 (48.9)	17.5 (63.5)	22.1 (71.8)	25.6 (78.1)	25.6 (78.1)	21.2 (70.2)	13.9 (57.0)	5.3 (41.5)	−1.6 (29.1)	11.2 (52.2)
Daily mean °C (°F)	−8.0 (17.6)	−7.4 (18.7)	−2.9 (26.8)	3.9 (39.0)	10.9 (51.6)	15.8 (60.4)	19.7 (67.5)	20.0 (68.0)	15.2 (59.4)	8.3 (46.9)	1.5 (34.7)	−5.0 (23.0)	6.0 (42.8)
Mean daily minimum °C (°F)	−13.2 (8.2)	−13.3 (8.1)	−8.5 (16.7)	−1.6 (29.1)	4.5 (40.1)	10.1 (50.2)	14.8 (58.6)	15.4 (59.7)	10.0 (50.0)	3.4 (38.1)	−2.3 (27.9)	−9.3 (15.3)	0.8 (33.4)
Record low °C (°F)	−28.8 (−19.8)	−29.0 (−20.2)	−27.0 (−16.6)	−14.7 (5.5)	−4.8 (23.4)	−0.7 (30.7)	3.5 (38.3)	4.6 (40.3)	0.1 (32.2)	−5.8 (21.6)	−17.1 (1.2)	−26.3 (−15.3)	−29.0 (−20.2)
Average precipitation mm (inches)	48.2 (1.90)	37.1 (1.46)	47.3 (1.86)	49.4 (1.94)	69.5 (2.74)	73.1 (2.88)	139.2 (5.48)	149.1 (5.87)	151.0 (5.94)	123.1 (4.85)	104.8 (4.13)	76.2 (3.00)	1,067.9 (42.04)
Average precipitation days (≥ 1.0 mm)	17.2	13.8	14.5	11.6	11.5	9.7	11.3	11.9	13.5	16.4	19.0	20.0	170.4
Mean monthly sunshine hours	59.5	77.8	117.3	154.4	193.1	172.5	166.1	156.4	151.2	118.6	53.3	38.1	1,460.6
Source: Japan Meteorological Agency (1991–2020 normals, extremes 1977–present)

== History ==
Shibetsu was founded in 1899 as the last of the tondenhei settlements, established by the Meiji government to colonize Hokkaido with soldier-settlers. In 1902: Shibetsu village became a second class village, and was raised to town status in 1925. In 1954 Shibetsu merged with Kamishibetsu village, Tayoro village, and Onneppu village to form Shibetsu city. In 2005 Asahi town was merged into Shibetsu city.

== Government ==
Shibetsu has a mayor-council form of government with a directly elected mayor and a unicameral city council of 14 members. Shibetsu, collectively with the other municipalities of Kawakami sub-prefecture, contributes three members to the Hokkaidō Prefectural Assembly. In terms of national politics, the town is part of the Hokkaidō 6th district of the lower house of the Diet of Japan.

== Economy ==
The economy of Shibetsu is based on agricultural and livestock. Starch manufacturing became popular in the Taisho era, and sugar refining became popular from the early Showa era. Even today, there is a beet sugar factory, and it is a major industry. Under the slogan "Suffolk Land Shibetsu," the city is focusing on sheep farming, and about 30 types of sheep, mainly Suffolk sheep, are raised on the city-run ranch. Testing facilities for automobile and tire manufacturers have been built, and cold weather tests are conducted using the harsh winter cold.

== Education ==
Shibetsu has seven public elementary school, five public junior high schools and one public high school operated by the city government. One more public high school is operated by the Hokkaido Prefectural Board of Education.

== Transportation ==
=== Railways ===
JR Hokkaido - Sōya Main Line

■ Shibetsu - Tayoro - Mizuho

=== Highways ===
- Dō-Ō Expressway
- National Route 40
- National Route 239

== Sister cities and friendship cities ==
=== Sister city ===
- Goulburn, New South Wales, Australia

=== Friendship city ===
- (Japan) Miyoshi, Aichi Prefecture

== Culture ==
=== Mascots ===
Sahocchi, Mei-chan, Mi-chan and Janpun, the city's mascots

Shibetsu's mascots are Sahocchi (さほっち), Mei-chan (メイちゃん), Mi-chan (みーちゃん) and Janpun (ジャンプん).

- Sahocchi, whose real name is Kurosuke Hitsujida (羊田 黒助), is a cheerful and friendly ram. His birthday is July 1. On 24 August 2014, he married Mei-chan at Tsukumosuigo Park.
- Mei-chan, whose real name is Mei Hitsujida (羊田 メイ), is a shy yet kind, kind, cheerful and energetic ewe. Her birthday is May 5.
- Mi-chan, whose real name is Miu Hitsujida (羊田 未生), is a lamb who is the daughter of Sahocchi and Mei-chan. She was born on 1 January 2015.
- Janpun is a farmer boy from Asahi who loves to ski jump. He assists the Asahi Chamber of Commerce and Industry Youth Club. Sahocchi, Mei-chan and Mi-chan depend on him for any advice.
