= Fūren Station =

Railway station in Nayoro, Hokkaido, Japan

W46 Fūren Station 風連駅
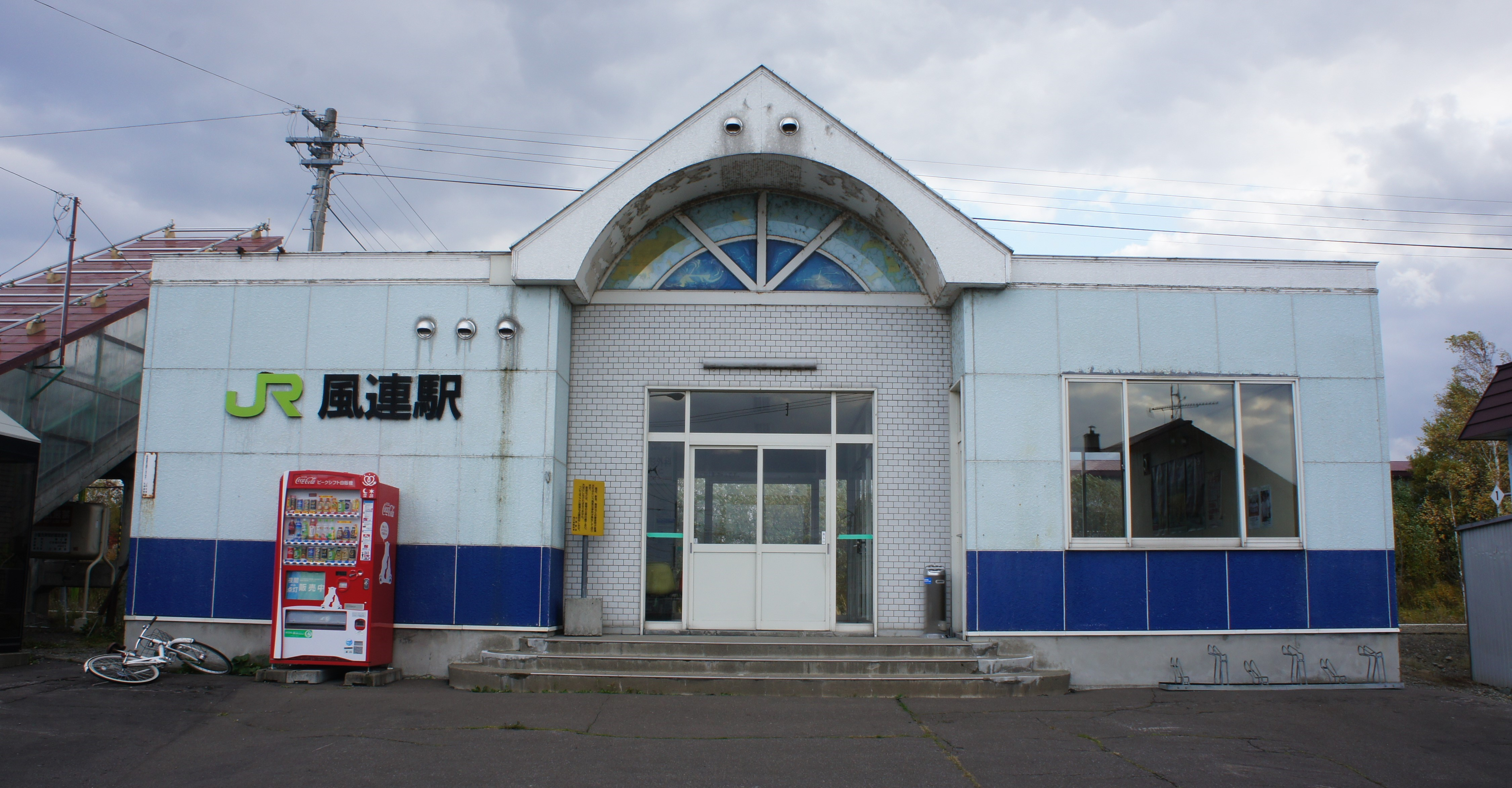
- Fūren Station in 2017

General information
- Location: Tokuda, Nayoro-shi, Hokkaido 096-0071; Japan
- Coordinates: 44°17′32″N 142°25′17″E
- System: regional rail
- Operator: JR Hokkaido
- Line: Sōya Main Line
- Distance: 68.1 km (42.3 mi) from Asahikawa
- Platforms: 1 side platform
- Train operators: JR Hokkaido

Construction
- Structure type: At grade

Other information
- Status: Unattended
- Station code: W46
- Website: Official website

History
- Opened: 3 September 1903

Passengers
- FY2023: 32

Services
Preceding station	JR Hokkaido	Following station
Nayorokōkō towards Wakkanai	Sōya Main Line Local	Mizuho towards Asahikawa
Nayorokōkō towards Wakkanai	Sōya Main Line Limited Express Nayoro	Shibetsu towards Asahikawa
Location
- Location within Hokkaido Location within Japan

Fūren Station (風連駅, Fūren-eki) is a railway station located in the Fūren neighborhood of the city of Nayoro, Hokkaidō, Japan. It is operated by JR Hokkaido.

== Lines ==
The station is served by the 259.4 km (161.2 mi) Soya Main Line from Asahikawa to Wakkanai and is located 68.1 km from the starting point of the line at Asahikawa.

== Layout ==
The station is an above-ground station with two staggered side platforms and two tracks connected by a footbridge. However, the station was remodeled to a single track structure by 1999, with Platform 2 no longer in use. The station is unattended.

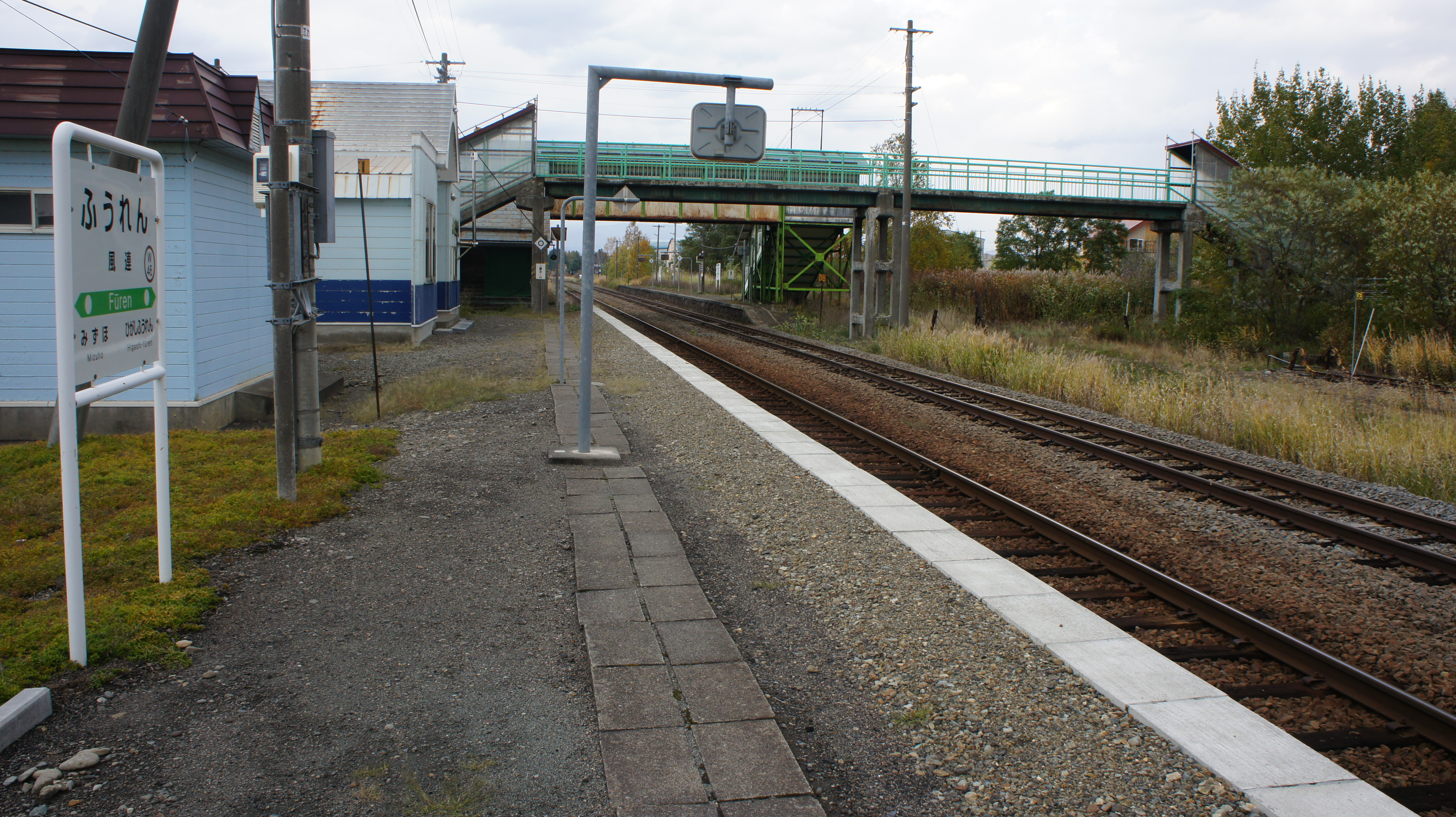
Platform

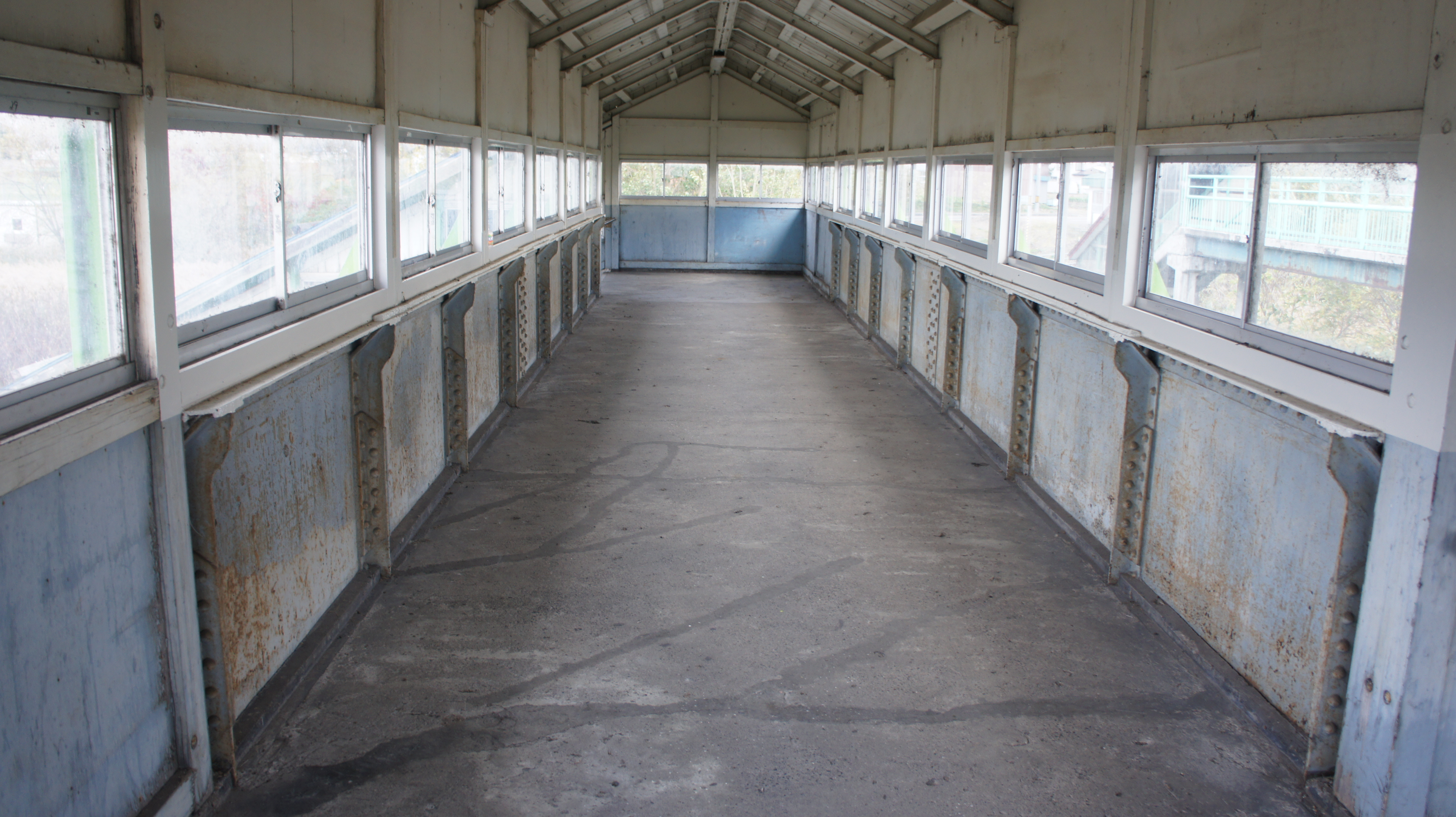
Overpass

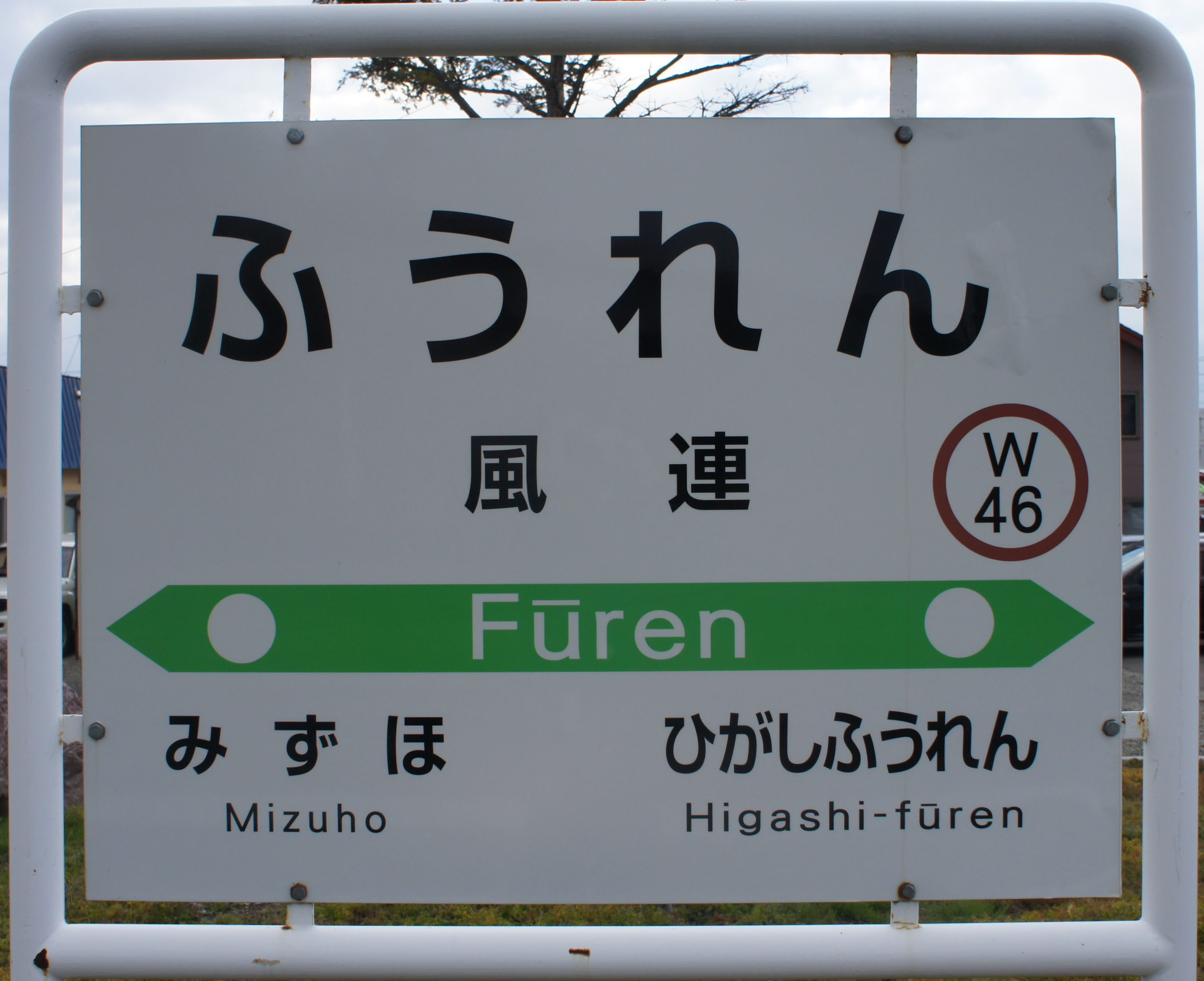
Signage

== History ==
The station was opened as on 3 September 1903. With the privatization of Japanese National Railways (JNR) on 1 April 1987, the station came under the control of JR Hokkaido. The station building was rebuilt in 1989.

== Passenger statistics ==
During fiscal 2023, the station was used on average by 32 passengers daily.

== Surrounding area ==
- former Furen town hall
- Japan National Route 40

== See also ==
- List of railway stations in Japan
