= Nayoro City University Junior College =

Junior college in Nayoro, Hokkaido, Japan

Coordinates: 44.3642°N 142.4591°E

- 名寄市立大学短期大学部
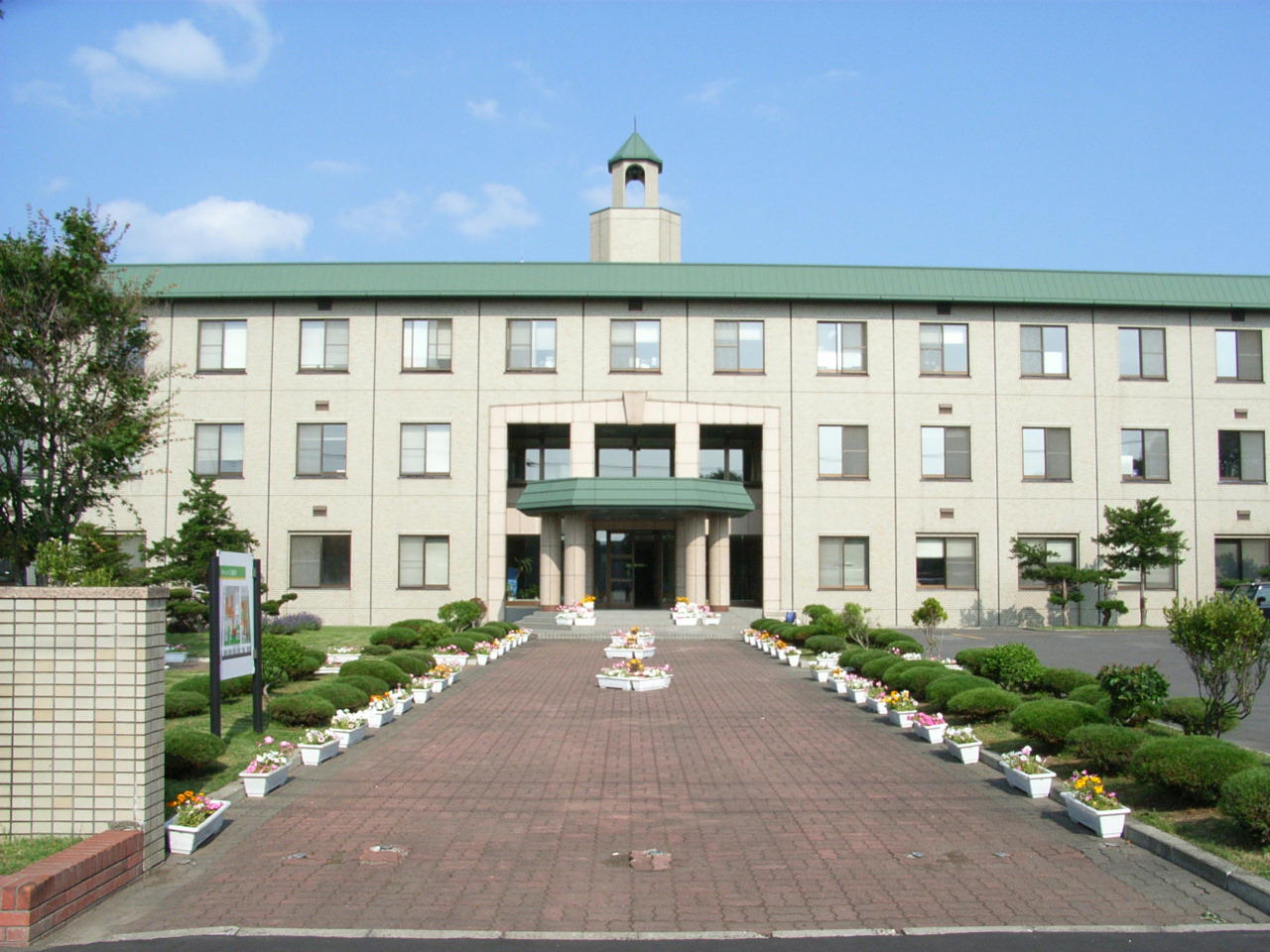
- Nayoro City University and Nayoro City University Junior College
- Type: Junior college
- Established: 1960
- Location: Nayoro, Hokkaido, Japan
- Website: www.nayoro.ac.jp/faculty/j_college/child/index.html

Nayoro City University Junior College (名寄市立大学短期大学部, Nayoro Shiritsu Daigaku Tanki Daigakubu) is a junior college in the city of Nayoro in Hokkaido, Japan.

== History ==
The college opened in April 1960 for women only, but in April 1990, it became coeducational, adopting the present name at the same time.

== See also ==
- Nayoro City University
- List of junior colleges in Japan
