= Nayorokōkō Station =

Railway station in Nayoro, Hokkaido, Japan

W47 Nayorokōkō Station 名寄高校駅
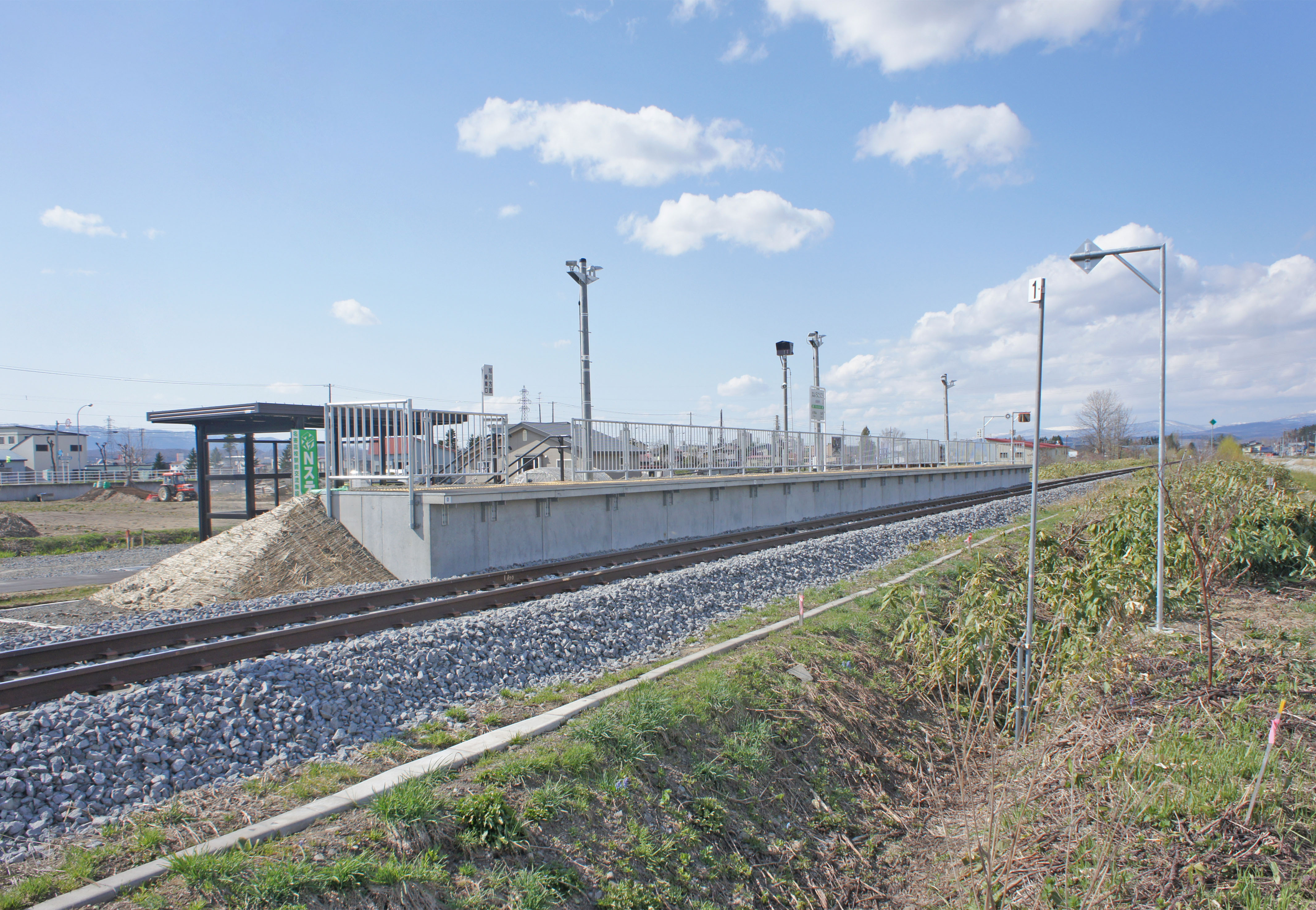
- Nayorokōkō Station

General information
- Location: Tokuda, Nayoro-shi, Hokkaido 096-0071; Japan
- Coordinates: 44°19′51.1″N 142°27′55.5″E
- System: regional rail
- Operator: JR Hokkaido
- Line: Sōya Main Line
- Distance: 74.1 km (46.0 mi) from Asahikawa
- Platforms: 1 side platform
- Train operators: JR Hokkaido

Construction
- Structure type: At grade

Other information
- Status: Unattended
- Station code: W47
- Website: Official website

History
- Opened: 20 September 1956
- Former names: Higashi-Fūren (to 1922)

Passengers
- FY2022: <10

Services
Preceding station	JR Hokkaido	Following station
Nayoro towards Wakkanai	Sōya Main Line Local	Fūren towards Asahikawa
Nayoro towards Wakkanai	Sōya Main Line Limited Express Nayoro	Fūren towards Asahikawa
Location
- Location within Hokkaido Location within Japan

Nayorokōkō Station (名寄高校駅, Nayorokōkō-eki) is a railway station located in the city of Nayoro, Hokkaidō, Japan. It is operated by JR Hokkaido.

== Lines ==
The station is served by the 259.4 km (161.2 mi) Soya Main Line from Asahikawa to Wakkanai and is located 74.1 km from the starting point of the line at Asahikawa.

== Layout ==
The station is an above-ground station with one track and one side platform (approximately 50 meters long and 2 meters wide). The platform is located on the left side when facing towards Wakkanai, and is equipped with stairs and a slope. There is no roof over the platform, but there is a waiting facility in front of the station to protect from rain and snow.

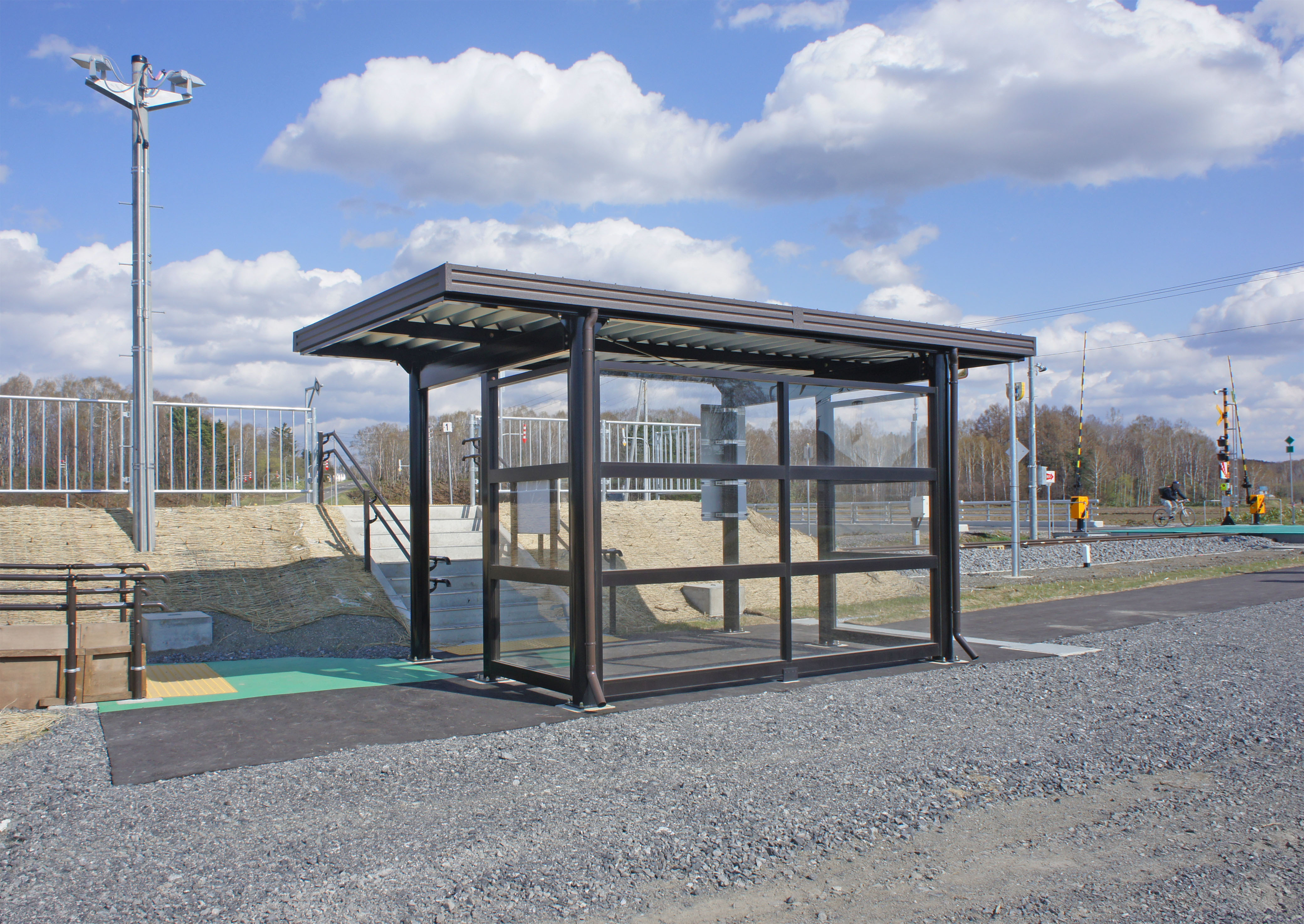
Waiting room

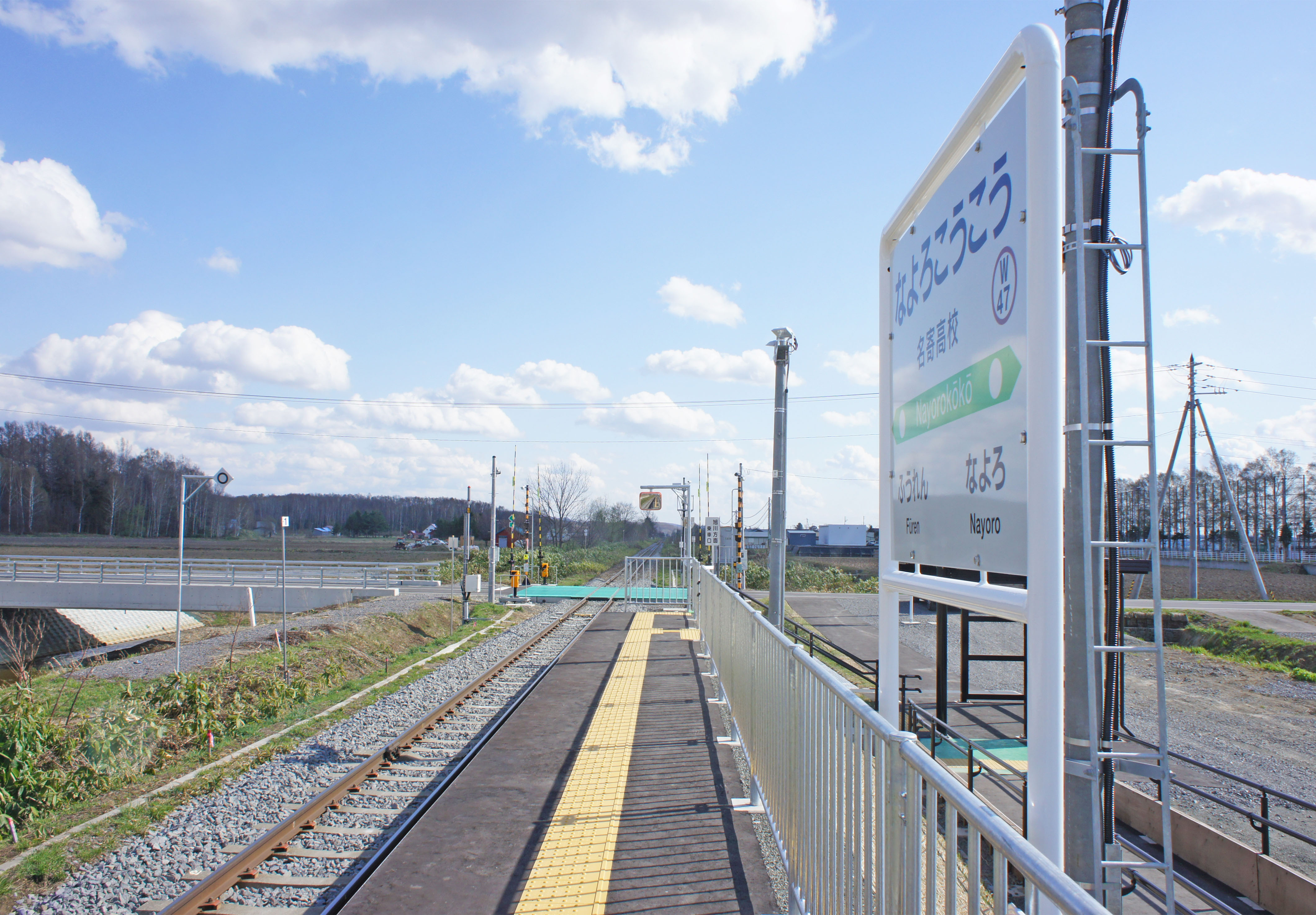
Platform

== History ==
The station was opened as Higashi-Fūren Station (東風連駅) on 20 September 1956. With the privatization of Japanese National Railways (JNR) on 1 April 1987, the station came under the control of JR Hokkaido. In 2018 the city of requested that the station be relocated at the city's expense 1.5 kilometers towards Wakkanai as most of the passengers were students of Nayoro High School. This was implemented on 12 March 2022 and the station renamed on that date.

== Passenger statistics ==
During fiscal 2022, the station was used on average by 2 passengers daily.

== Surrounding area ==
- Hokkaido Nayoro High School
- Japan National Route 40

== See also ==
- List of railway stations in Japan
