= Myra Arai =

Canadian-Japanese actress and model (born 2001)

- 新井 舞良
- Born: 10 January 2001 (age 24); Nayoro, Hokkaido, Japan
- Other names: Myra Meadows (メドウズ 舞良)
- Occupations: Actress; model
- Years active: 2018–
- Agent: Ken-on
- Website: www.ken-on.co.jp/artists/arai/

Myra Meadows (メドウズ 舞良, Medōzu Maira; born January 10, 2001), known professionally as Myra Arai (新井 舞良, Arai Maira), is a Canadian-Japanese actress and model.

== Personal life ==
Born in Nayoro, Hokkaido, Japan, her father is Canadian and her mother Japanese. While still a high-school student, she was scouted by Twin Planet Entertainment in Tokyo. In 2018, she appeared on the "Fall in Love♥Weekend Homestay" reality show broadcast on video streaming website, AbemaTV. That same year, she won the grand prize in a beauty contest run by VoCE Magazine (Kodansha Publishing) and became an exclusive model for said magazine. In February 2019, she was made an official Tourism Ambassador of her hometown, Nayoro in Hokkaido. In May 2021, she joined the Ken-On talent agency, taking the stage name Myra Arai.

== Career ==
Since 2019, Arai has featured in a variety of magazines and fashion shows. She has also made several appearances in dramas, TV shows, music and online videos. In October 2024, the advertising video for Amazon music LIVE in which she appears was released to the world.

== Appearances ==
Movies

- The Great Yokai War: Guardians（released in Japan on August 13, 2021, by Toho and Kadokawa Pictures.）as "Rokurokubi"

Drama

- The Confession of the Sirens（Oct. 18, 2020～、WOWOW）as "Nakata Miku"
- Suicide Dance（peep） as "Riho Sanagi" (leading role)
- Shujinko（Sept. 2, 2019 - YouTube） - as "Yuri Koizumi"
- Red Eyes Surveillance Squad: Episode 1（Jan. 23, 2021、Nihon Television） - as "Tomomi"
- Kamen Rider Genms -The Presidents-（broadcast on Toei Tokusatsu Fan Club April 11 & 18, 2021）as "Rin"

TV shows

- Rose-coloured Dandy on TOKYO MX
- SKATTO JAPAN: The Greatest Collection of Feel-good Stories on Fuji Television
- BeauTV〜VoCE on TV Asahi
- The Gift on Nihon Television
- SengokuchahanTV（Aug. 1, 2020～) on TOKYO MX
- Charidar★Kaikan! Cycle Clinic（Dec. 25,2021) on NHK BS1
- Oruoru Audrey（Oct. 8,2022) on TELASA
- ONE Figft Night8（Mar. 25,2023) on ABEMA Fighting ch.
- Saizensen!Micchaku Police 24h Haru no Tokubetsu Keikai SP（Mar. 29,2023) on TBS
- Nyan-chew!Uchu!Housou-chew!(Apr.6-,2023) on NHK Etele
- ONE Figft Night9（Apr 22,2023) on ABEMA Fighting ch.

TV variety show

- Kiseki Taiken Unbelievable(Oct.24,2019) on Fuji Television
- Gyoretsu no Dekiru Horitsu Sodanjo(Aug.30. 2020) on Nihon Television
- Nichiyoubi no Hatsumimigaku(May 15,2022) on TBS
- Odoru Sanma Goten(Jun. 21,2022) on Nihon Television
- Barbee's HappyPampeeTV（Aug. 14-21,2022) on BSJapanext
- 1okunin no Daishitumon!?Waratte Koraete!（Aug.24,2022） on Nihon Television
- Himitsu no Kenmin Show Kiwami（Dec. 1,2022） on Nihon Television
- Ookami Shonen（Dec. 16,2022) on TBS

Magazines

- 「VoCE」 Exclusive model by Kodansha
- 「bis」 by Kobunsha
- 「CanCam」 by Shogakukan
- 「CM NOW」 by Genkosha
- 「BOMB」 by Gakken Plus
- 「SPA!」 by Fusosha
- 「FLASH Special」 by Kobunsha

Fashion shows

- GirlsAward
- Kobe Collection
- Kansai Collection
- Sapporo Collection

Commercial

- Amazon music "Amazon music LIVE" Oct. 2024

Internet TV

- Fall in Love♥Weekend Homestay on AbemaTV
- ImappoTV on AbemaTV
- Kudo Santa on AbemaTV
- Oruganzaka Seitokai on DHC Television

Music videos

- PELICAN FANCLUB "Sangenshoku -Primary Colors-"
- Chiaki Satoh "Sora kara oshiru hoshi no youni -Like a Star Falling from the Sky-"
- KAF feat. KAFU "Furachi na kassai"
