= Tayoro Station =

Railway station in Shibetsu, Hokkaido, Japan

W44 Tayoro Station 多寄駅
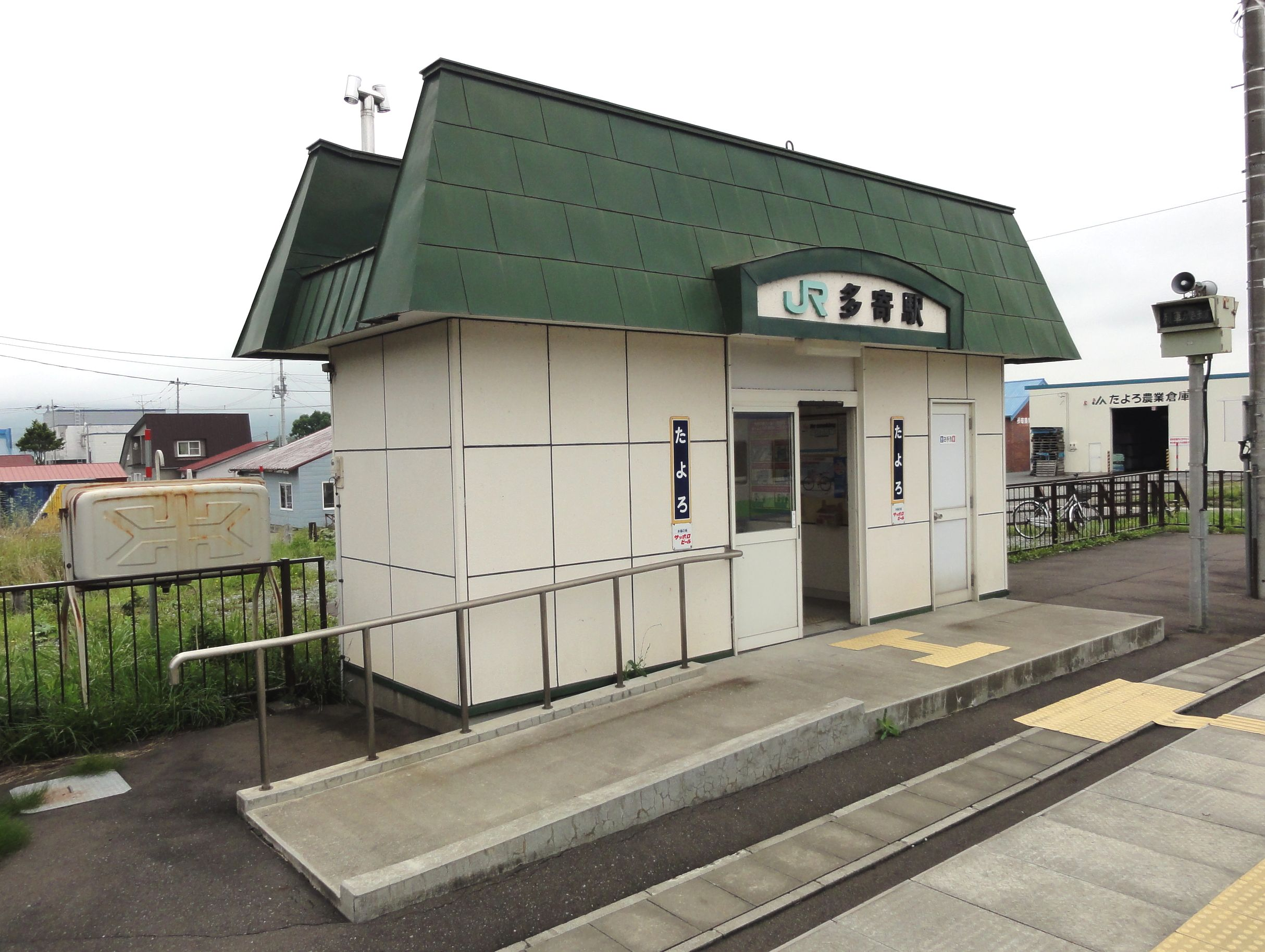
- Tayoro Station

General information
- Location: Tayoro-cho, Shibetsu-shi, Hokkaido 098-0475; Japan
- Coordinates: 44°14′26″N 142°23′46″E operator = JR Hokkaido
- System: regional rail
- Line: Sōya Main Line
- Distance: 61.7 km (38.3 mi) from Asahikawa
- Platforms: 1 side platform
- Train operators: JR Hokkaido

Construction
- Structure type: At grade

Other information
- Status: Unattended
- Station code: W44
- Website: Official website

History
- Opened: 4 September 1903

Passengers
- FY2022: >10 daily

Services
Preceding station	JR Hokkaido	Following station
Mizuho towards Wakkanai	Sōya Main Line Local	Shibetsu towards Asahikawa
Location
- Location within Hokkaido Location within Japan

Tayoro Station (多寄駅, Tayoro-eki) is a railway station located in the Tayoro-chō neighborhood of the city of Shibetsu City, Kamikawa-shichō, Hokkaidō, Hokkaidō, Japan. It is operated by JR Hokkaido.

== Lines ==
The station is served by the 259.4 km (161.2 mi) Soya Main Line from Asahikawa to Wakkanai and is located 61.7 km from the starting point of the line at Asahikawa.

== Layout ==
The station is an above-ground station with one track and one side platform. The station is unattended.

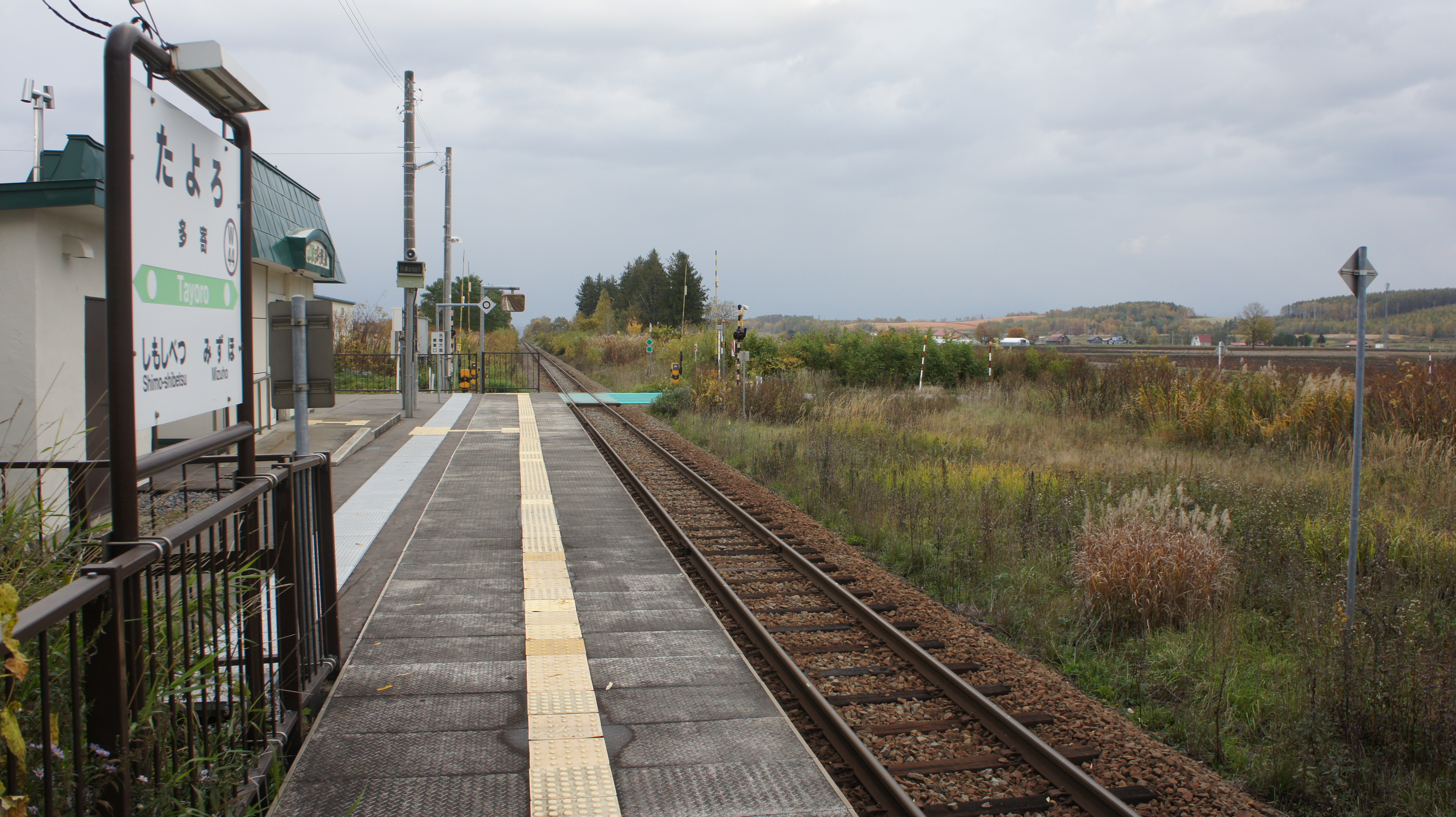
Platform

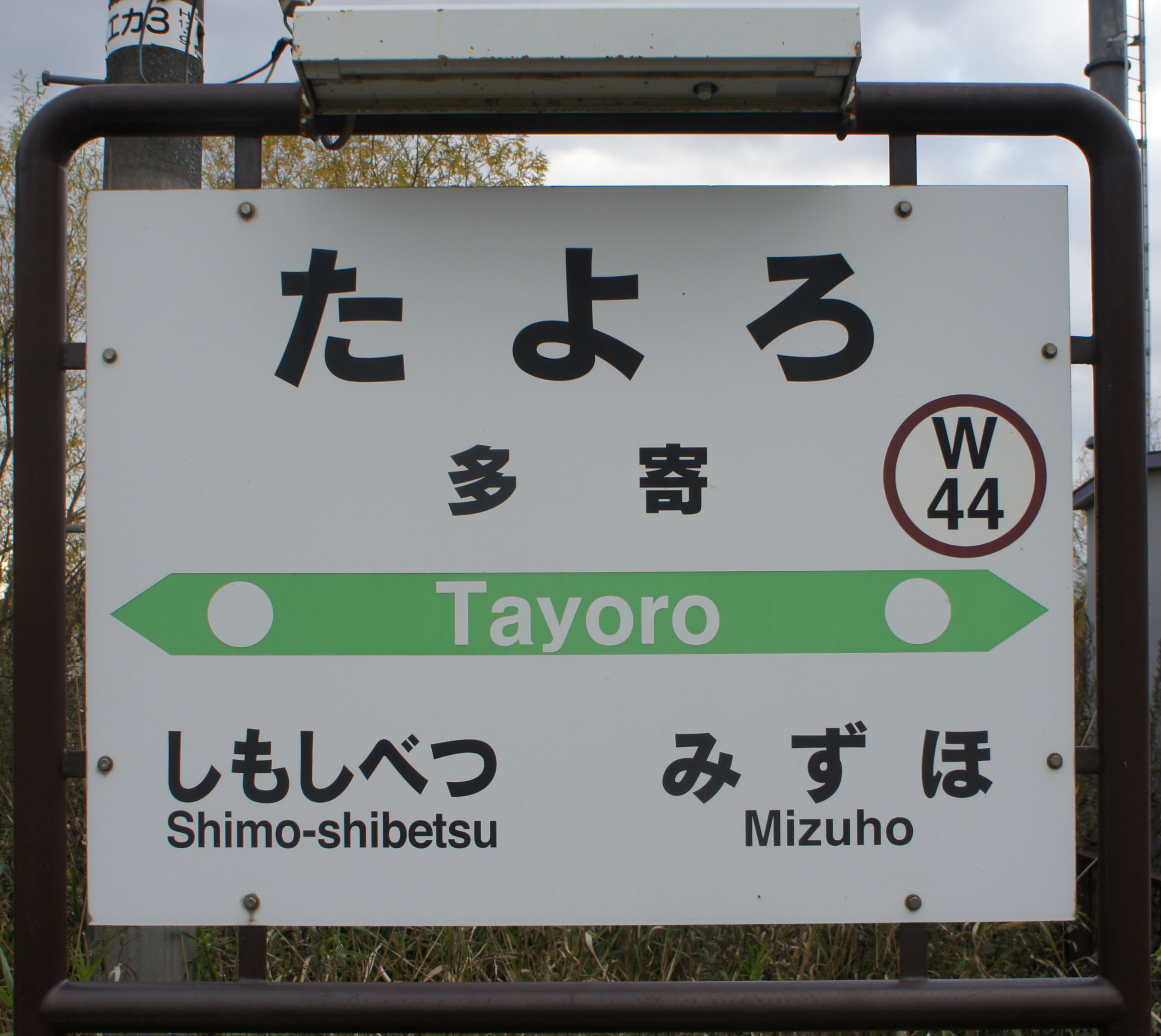
Sign board

== History ==
The station was opened as on 3 September 1903 with the extension of the Hokkaido Government Railway Teshio Line between Shibetsu Station and Nayoro Station. With the privatization of Japanese National Railways (JNR) on 1 April 1987, it was raised to a full passenger train station, and came under the control of JR Hokkaido. The current station building was remodeled in 1988 and was moved approximately 20 meters toward Asahikawa in 1999.

== Passenger statistics ==
During fiscal 2022, the station was used on average less than 10 passengers daily.

== Surrounding area ==
- Japan National Route 40
- former Tayoro Town Hall

== See also ==
- List of railway stations in Japan
