= Nayoro =

Nayoro 名寄市
- City
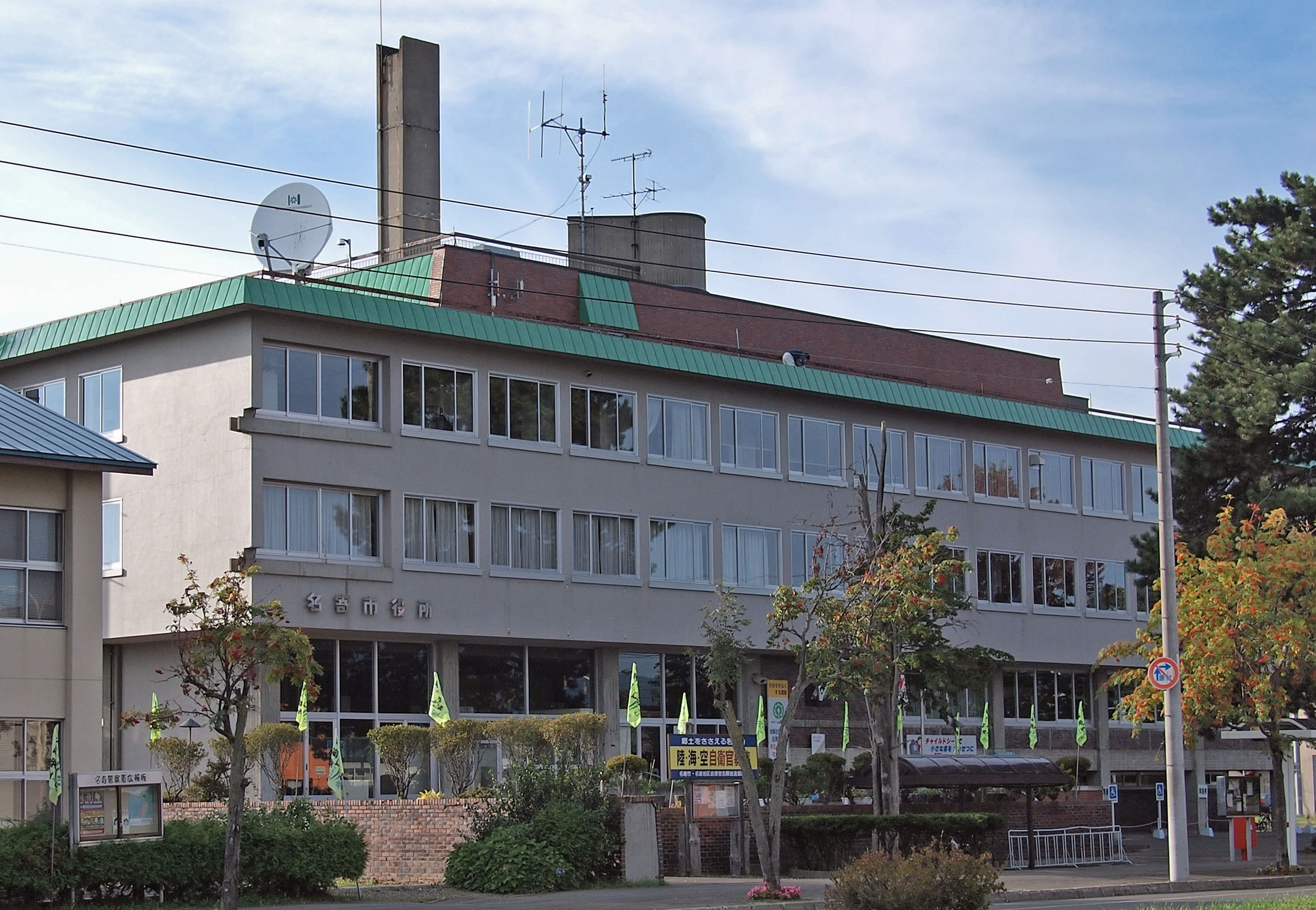
- Nayoro City Hall

- Flag Seal
- Location of Nayoro in Hokkaido (Kamikawa Subprefecture)

- Location in Japan
- Coordinates: 44°21′21″N 142°27′47″E
- Country: Japan
- Region: Hokkaido
- Prefecture: Hokkaido (Kamikawa Subprefecture)

Government
  - Mayor: Takeshi Kato

Area
  - Total: 534.86 km^{2} (206.51 sq mi)

Population (January 31, 2025)
  - Total: 24,702
  - Density: 46.184/km^{2} (119.62/sq mi)
- Time zone: UTC+09:00 (JST)
- City hall address: 1-1 Ōdōri Minami, Nayoro-shi, Hokkaido 096-8686
- Climate: Dfb
- Website: Official website
- Symbols
- Bird: Great spotted woodpecker
- Flower: Ōbana enreisō (Trillium kamtschaticum)
- Mascot: Nayoro-kun (なよろう)
- Tree: Japanese white birch

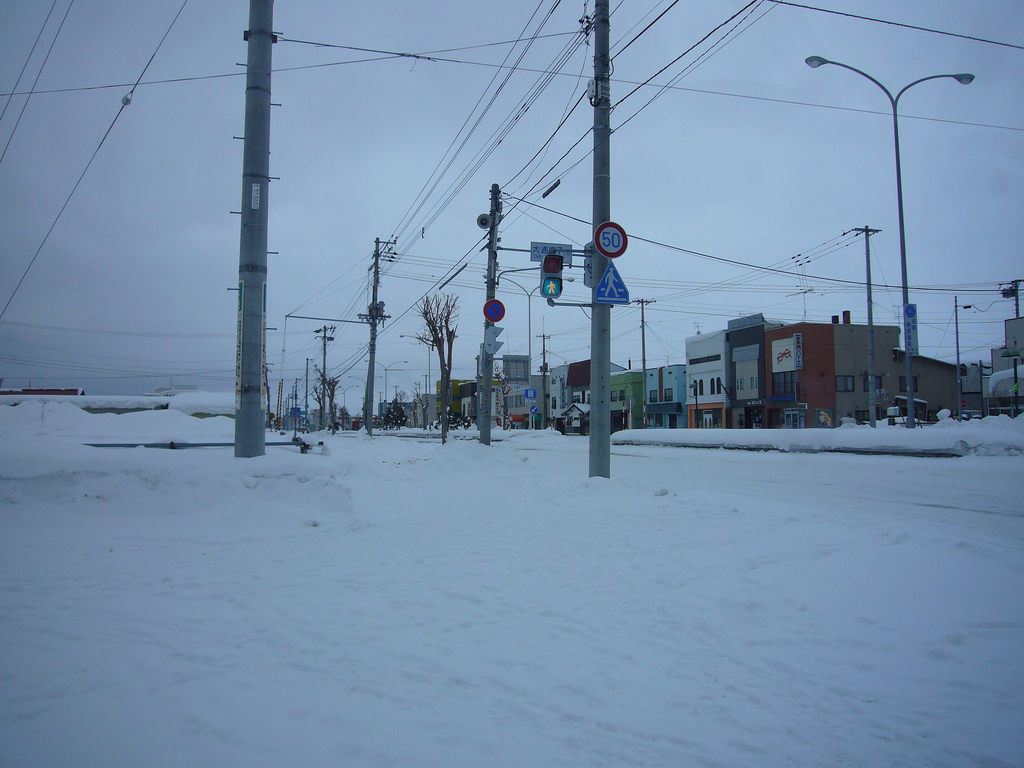
A street in front of Nayoro Station

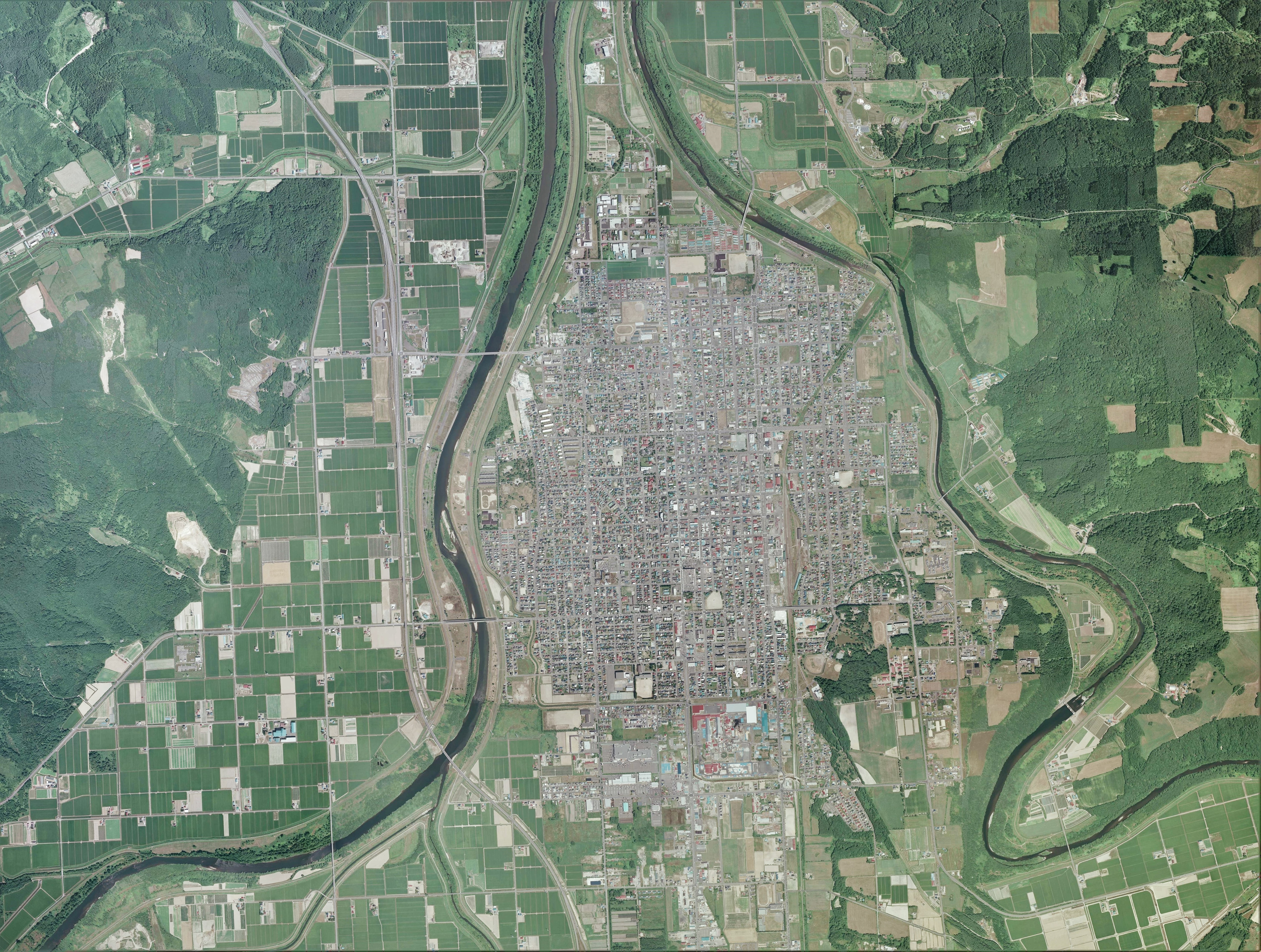
Nayoro city center

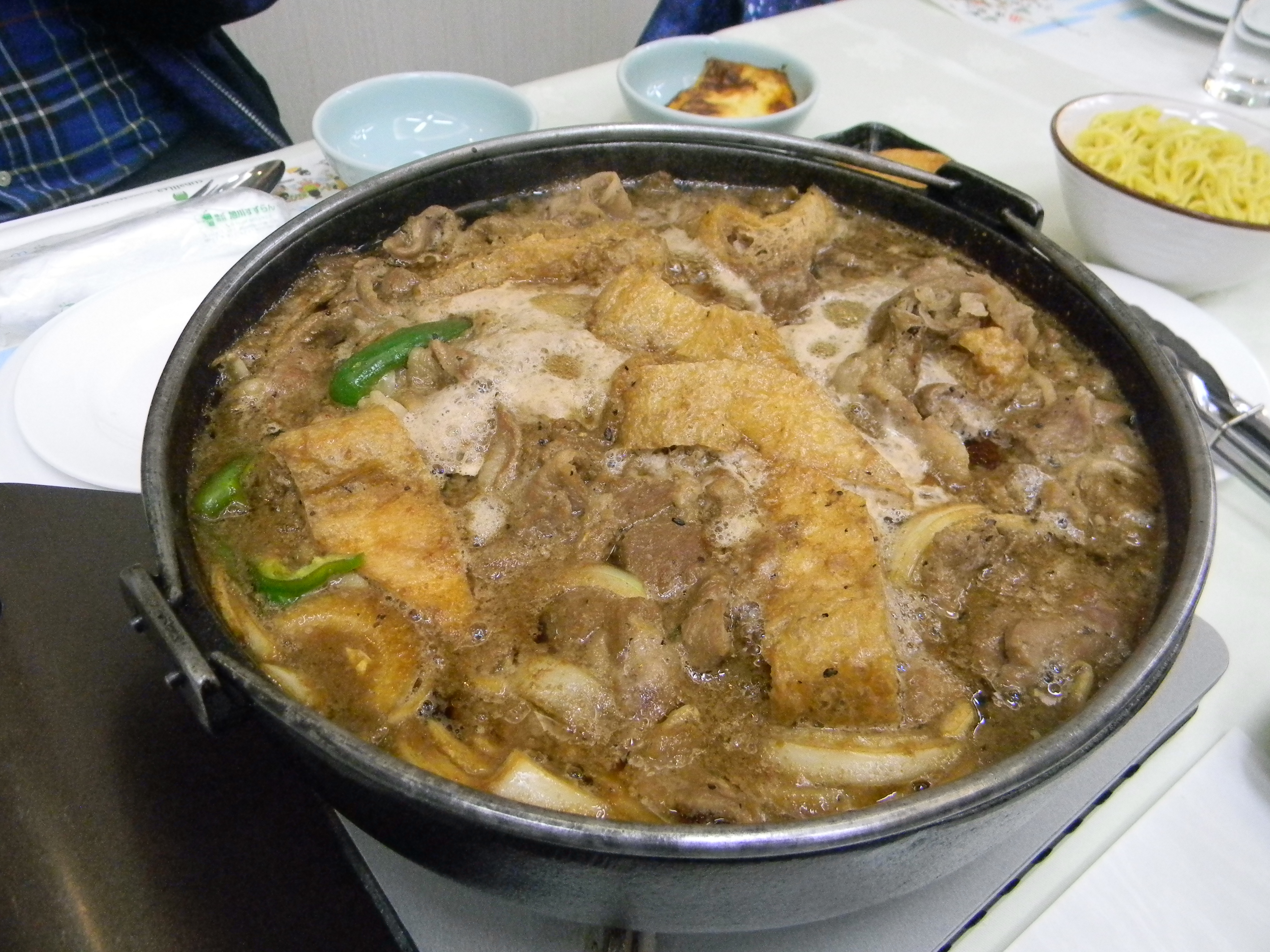
Jingisukan stew in Nayoro

Nayoro (名寄市, Nayoro-shi; Japanese pronunciation: [nä̀.jó̞.ɾó̞(.ɕì), nä́.jò̞.ɾò̞], locally [nä̀.jó̞.ɾó̞], Ainu: Nay Oro lit. 'in the middle of the valley') is a city in Kamikawa Subprefecture, Hokkaido, Japan. As of 31 January 2025, the city had an estimated population of 24,702, and a population density of 46 people per km^{2}. The total area of the city is 534.861 km^{2} (206.511 sq mi).

== Geography ==
The main rivers in the Nayoro Basin in northern Hokkaido are the Teshio River and its tributary, the Nayoro River. The urban area of Nayoro was formed islightly upstream from the confluence of the two rivers.

=== Neighbouring municipalities ===
- Hokkaido
  - Shibetsu
  - Shimokawa
  - Bifuka
  - Horokanai
  - Omu

=== Demographics ===
Per Japanese census data, the population of Nayoro is as shown below. The city is in a long period of sustained population loss.

Historical population
Year	Pop.	±%
1930	32,632	—
1940	40,048	+22.7%
1950	48,180	+20.3%
1960	43,874	−8.9%
1970	42,222	−3.8%
1980	37,194	−11.9%
1990	32,429	−12.8%
2000	33,328	+2.8%
2010	30,582	−8.2%
2020	27,282	−10.8%

== Climate ==
Nayoro has a Humid continental climate (Köppen Dfb) characterized by warm summers and cold winters with heavy snowfall. The average annual temperature in Nayoro is 5.0 °C. The average annual rainfall is 1281 mm with September as the wettest month. The temperatures are highest on average in August, at around 19.2 °C, and lowest in January, at around -9.1 °C.

Climate data for Nayoro (elevation 89 m, 1991–2020 normals, extremes 1976–present)
Month	Jan	Feb	Mar	Apr	May	Jun	Jul	Aug	Sep	Oct	Nov	Dec	Year
Record high °C (°F)	5.5 (41.9)	11.9 (53.4)	14.8 (58.6)	26.4 (79.5)	32.2 (90.0)	35.4 (95.7)	36.4 (97.5)	35.6 (96.1)	31.3 (88.3)	27.6 (81.7)	20.2 (68.4)	10.3 (50.5)	36.4 (97.5)
Mean daily maximum °C (°F)	−4.2 (24.4)	−2.7 (27.1)	2.0 (35.6)	9.3 (48.7)	17.5 (63.5)	22.3 (72.1)	25.6 (78.1)	25.7 (78.3)	21.4 (70.5)	14.2 (57.6)	5.3 (41.5)	−1.8 (28.8)	11.2 (52.2)
Daily mean °C (°F)	−8.6 (16.5)	−8.0 (17.6)	−3.0 (26.6)	3.8 (38.8)	10.8 (51.4)	15.6 (60.1)	19.5 (67.1)	19.9 (67.8)	15.2 (59.4)	8.3 (46.9)	1.5 (34.7)	−5.4 (22.3)	5.8 (42.4)
Mean daily minimum °C (°F)	−14.7 (5.5)	−14.9 (5.2)	−9.1 (15.6)	−1.7 (28.9)	4.1 (39.4)	9.6 (49.3)	14.4 (57.9)	15.1 (59.2)	9.9 (49.8)	3.1 (37.6)	−2.3 (27.9)	−10.1 (13.8)	0.3 (32.5)
Record low °C (°F)	−34.5 (−30.1)	−35.7 (−32.3)	−30.2 (−22.4)	−16.5 (2.3)	−5.9 (21.4)	−1.0 (30.2)	3.4 (38.1)	4.3 (39.7)	0.3 (32.5)	−6.0 (21.2)	−18.1 (−0.6)	−29.4 (−20.9)	−35.7 (−32.3)
Average precipitation mm (inches)	49.4 (1.94)	38.7 (1.52)	44.2 (1.74)	45.5 (1.79)	60.6 (2.39)	65.2 (2.57)	129.4 (5.09)	136.1 (5.36)	138.1 (5.44)	115.6 (4.55)	108.5 (4.27)	83.1 (3.27)	1,006.8 (39.64)
Average snowfall cm (inches)	186 (73)	147 (58)	128 (50)	33 (13)	0 (0)	0 (0)	0 (0)	0 (0)	0 (0)	3 (1.2)	104 (41)	225 (89)	829 (326)
Average precipitation days (≥ 1.0 mm)	16.6	14.1	14.0	10.9	10.4	9.2	10.6	11.4	13.6	16.1	19.3	21.3	166.8
Mean monthly sunshine hours	58.6	79.1	116.2	147.9	178.1	159.7	148.7	142.0	139.4	109.9	50.7	37.6	1,367.8
Source: Japan Meteorological Agency (1991–2020 normals, extremes 1976–present)

== History ==
The area of Nayoro has been inhabited since the Jōmon period, and was the site of a kotan was built by the Ainu people. On June 30, 1888, the Hokkaido government proclaimed the villages of Kaminayoro Shimonayoro. The area was initially settled by a group of colonists from Toei, Yamagata. In 1907, under the second-class town and village system was implemented, and Kaminayoro Village was established. It was raised to town status in 1915, becoming Nayoro Town. In 1920, Chiebun village split off from Shimonayoro village and was annexed by Nayoro in 1954. Nayoro was raised to city status in 1956.On March 27, 2006 Nayoro annexed the town of Fūren.

== Government ==
Nayoro has a mayor-council form of government with a directly elected mayor and a unicameral city council of 18 members. Nayoro, as part of Kawakami sub-prefecture, contributes three members to the Hokkaidō Prefectural Assembly. In terms of national politics, the city is part of the Hokkaidō 6th district of the lower house of the Diet of Japan.

== Economy ==
The economy of Nayoro is centered on agriculture, notably the production of glutinous rice. Asparagus, pumpkins and sunflowers are also produced in the area.

== Education ==
Nayoro has seven public elementary schools and four public junior high schools operated by the city government, and two public high school operated by the Hokkaidō Board of Education.

=== Universities ===
- Nayoro City University

=== Junior colleges ===
- Nayoro City University Junior College

=== High school ===
- Hokkaido Nayoro High School
- Hokkaido Nayoro Industry High School

== Transportation ==
=== Railways ===
JR Hokkaido - Sōya Main Line

■ Fūren - Nayorokōkō - Nayoro - Nisshin - Chiebun - Chihoku

=== Highways ===
Nayoro is linked with National Route 40 linking Wakkanai and southern Hokkaido as well as the Hokkaidō Expressway linking with the island capital of Sapporo. Nayoro is bypassed to the west with the Nayoro-Bifuka Road (Route 40) serving two interchanges.

- National Route 40
- National Route 239

== Sister cities ==
=== International ===
- Lindsay, Ontario, Canada
- Dolinsk, Russia.

=== Domestic ===
- (Japan) Fujishima, Yamagata
- (Japan) Suginami-ku, Tokyo

== Culture ==
=== Mascot ===
Nayoro-kun, the city's mascot

Nayoro's mascot is Nayoro-kun (なよろう). He is a mochi alien who loves star watching and collecting toys. He carries a telescope all the time to study the stars. He is designed by Sakiko Yatani from Ebetsu and was named by Ayumi Hagiwara from Sapporo.

== Noted people from Nayoro ==
- Myra Arai, fashion model
- Ryo Ikuemi, manga artist
- Naohiro Ishida, professional shogi player
- Nayoroiwa Shizuo, sumo wrestler
- Yuki Matsushita, actress
