= Nayoro City University =

Coordinates: 44.3644°N 142.4611°E

- 名寄市立大学
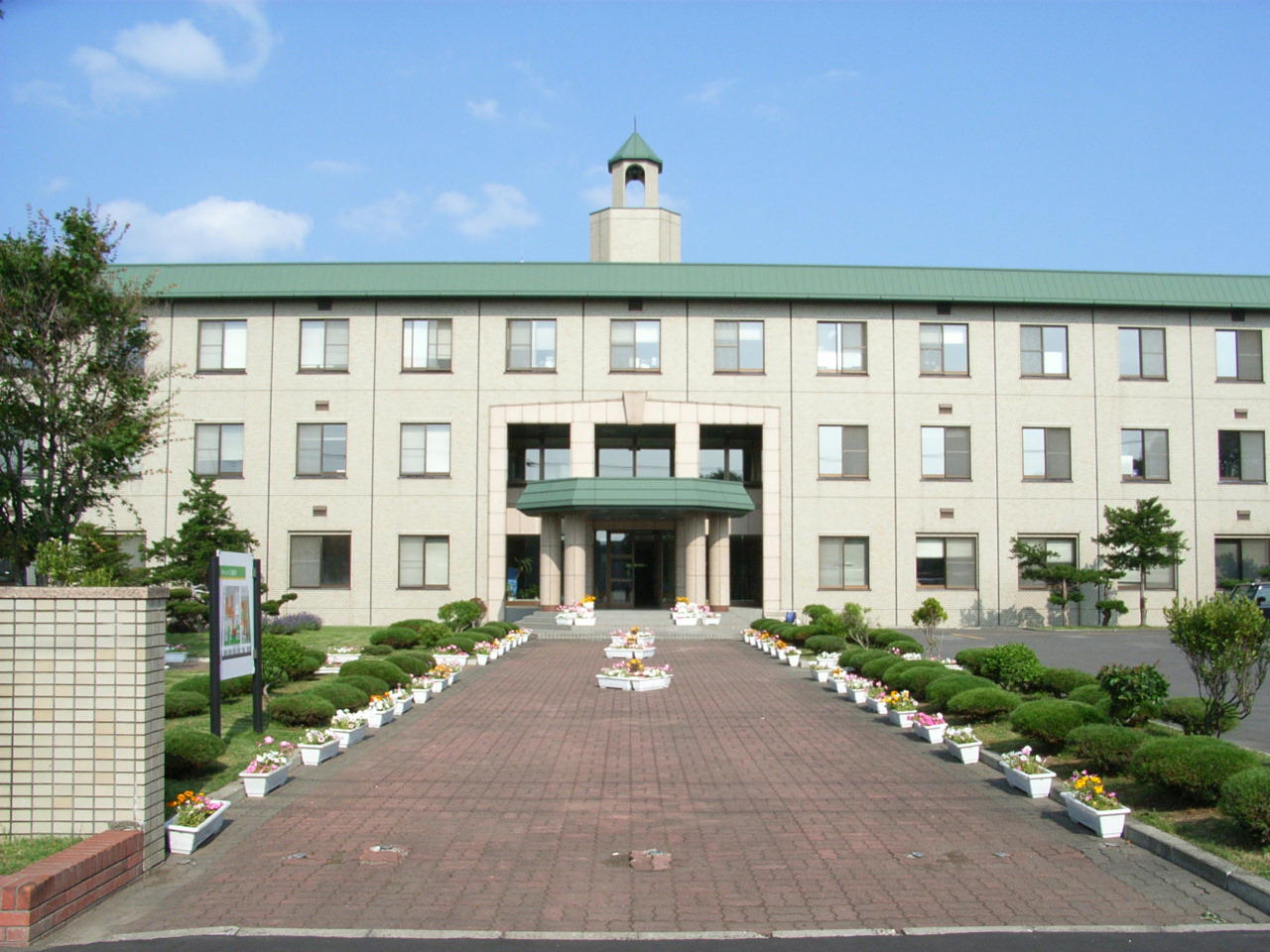
- Type: Public
- Established: 1960
- Location: Nayoro, Hokkaido, Japan
- Website: www.nayoro.ac.jp

Nayoro City University (名寄市立大学, Nayoro shiritsu daigaku) is a public university in Nayoro, Hokkaido, Japan. The school was established as a junior women's college in 1960, and it became a four-year college in 2006.
