= Fūren, Hokkaido =

Fūren 風連町
- Town
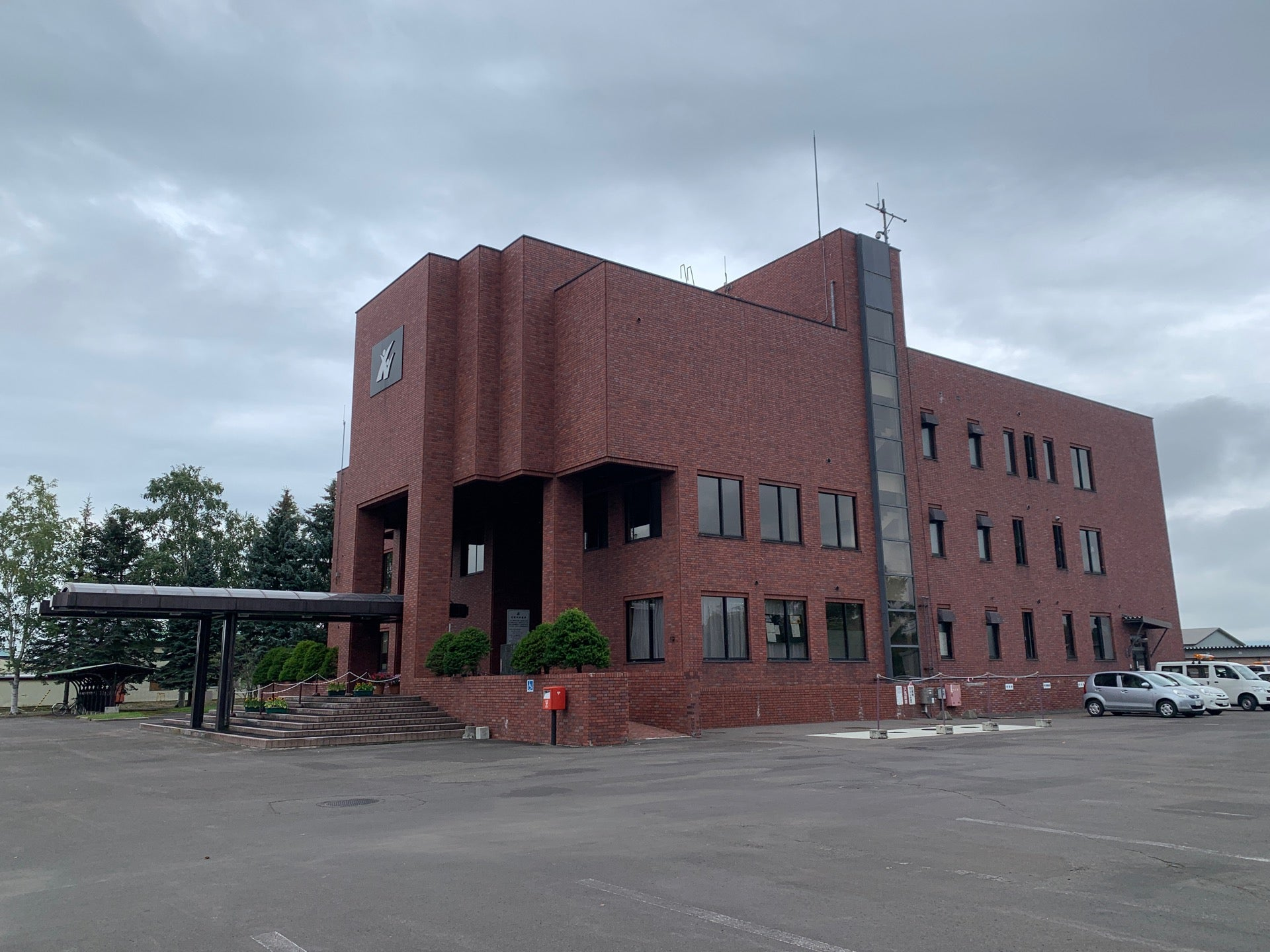
- Furen Town Hall (now Nayoro City Hall Furen Office)

- Flag Emblem

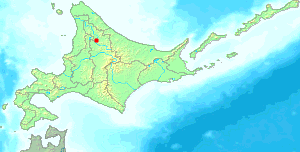
- Location of Fūren in Hokkaido (Kamikawa Subprefecture)

- Location in Japan
- Coordinates: 44°17′32″N 142°24′51″E
- Country: Japan
- Region: Hokkaido
- Prefecture: Hokkaido (Kamikawa Subprefecture)
- Now part of Nayoro: 27 March 2006

Area
  - Total: 220.61 km^{2} (85.18 sq mi)

Population (2005)
  - Total: 5,234
  - Density: 23.73/km^{2} (61.5/sq mi)
- Time zone: UTC+09:00 (JST)
- City hall address: 1 of 196 West, Fūren-cho, Kamikawa-gun, Hokkaido; 095-0507
- Symbols
- Flower: Phlox subulata
- Tree: Betula platyphylla

Fūren (風連町, Fūren-chō) was a town located in Kamikawa (Teshio) District, Kamikawa Subprefecture, Hokkaido, Japan.

As of 2004, the town had an estimated population of 5,234 and a density of 23.73 persons per km^{2}. The total area was 220.61 km^{2}.

On 27 March 2006, Fūren was merged into the expanded city of Nayoro. Before its dissolution, the town mascot was "Fumi-kun".

The primary industry in Fūren-chō is wet-rice farming.
