= Mizuho Station =

Railway station in Shibetsu, Hokkaido, Japan

W45 Mizuho Station 瑞穂駅
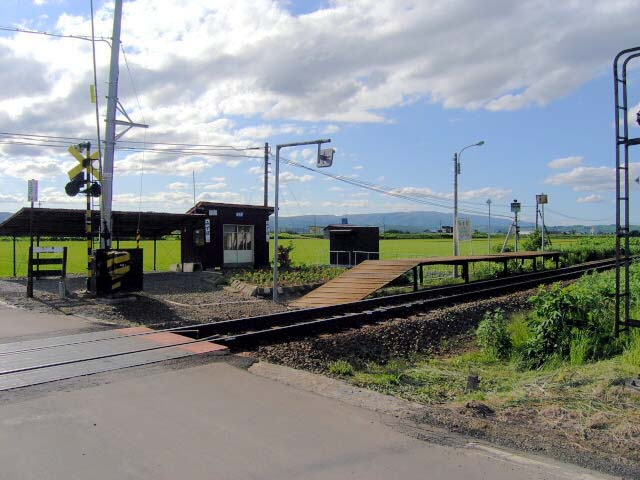
- Mizuho Station

General information
- Location: Tayoro-cho, Shibetsu-shi, Hokkaido 098-0475; Japan
- Coordinates: 44°15′58″N 142°23′46″E
- System: regional rail
- Operator: JR Hokkaido
- Line: Sōya Main Line
- Distance: 64.5 km (40.1 mi) from Asahikawa
- Platforms: 1 side platform
- Train operators: JR Hokkaido

Construction
- Structure type: At grade

Other information
- Status: Unattended
- Station code: W45
- Website: Official website

History
- Opened: 1 September 1956

Passengers
- FY2022: >3 daily

Services
Preceding station	JR Hokkaido	Following station
Fūren towards Wakkanai	Sōya Main Line Local	Tayoro towards Asahikawa
Location
- Location within Hokkaido Location within Japan

Mizuho Station (瑞穂駅, Mizuho-eki) is a railway station located in the Tayoro-chō neighborhood of the city of Shibetsu City, Kamikawa-shichō, Hokkaidō, Hokkaidō, Japan. It is operated by JR Hokkaido.

== Lines ==
The station is served by the 259.4 km (161.2 mi) Soya Main Line from Asahikawa to Wakkanai and is located 64.5 km from the starting point of the line at Asahikawa.

== Layout ==
The station is an above-ground station with one track and one side platform on the right side when facing towards Wakkanai. The platform is made of wood and is only long enough for one train car. A slope leads to the outside of the station on the Asahikawa side. A waiting room and bicycle parking area are located a short distance from the platform. The station is unattended.

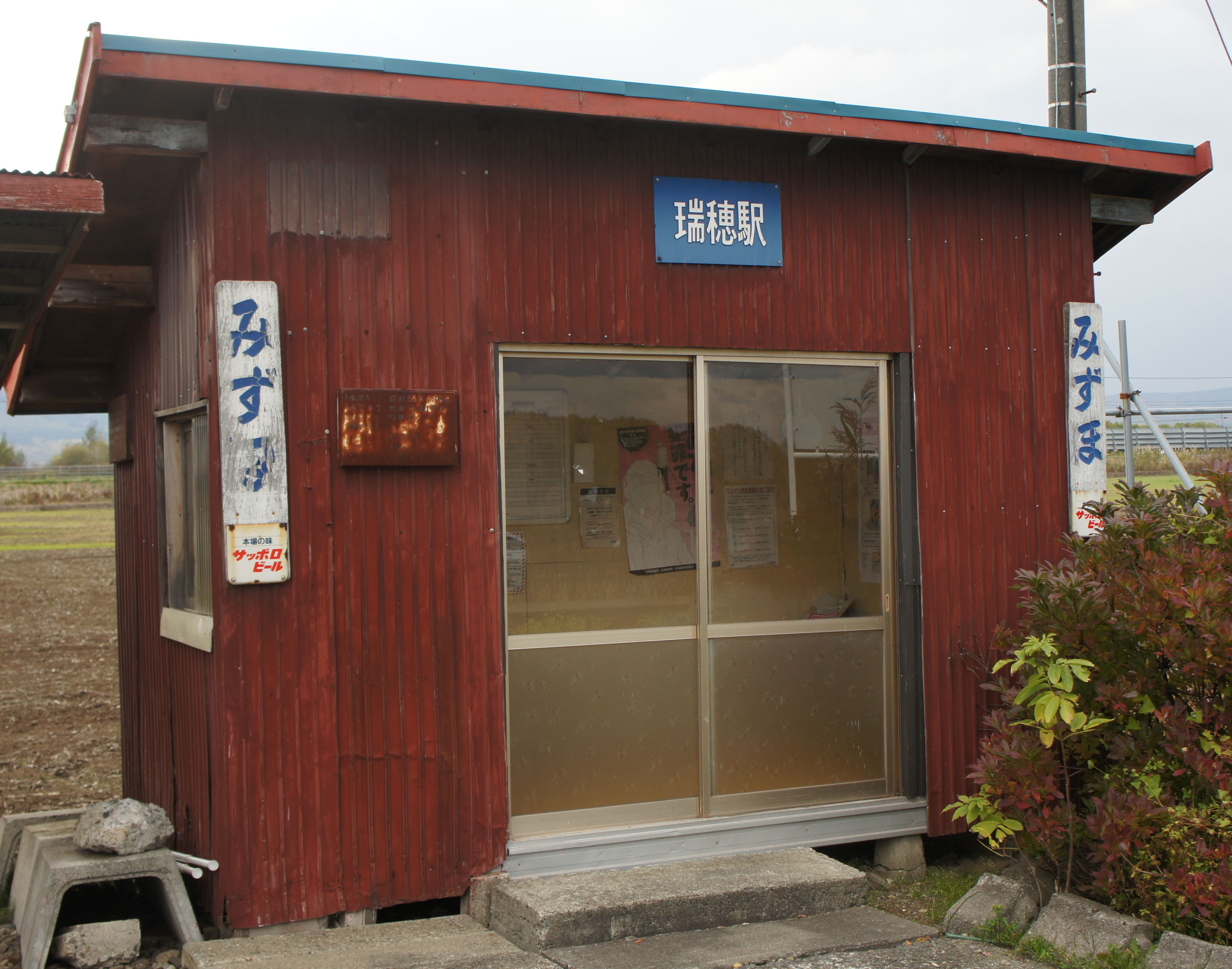
Waiting Room

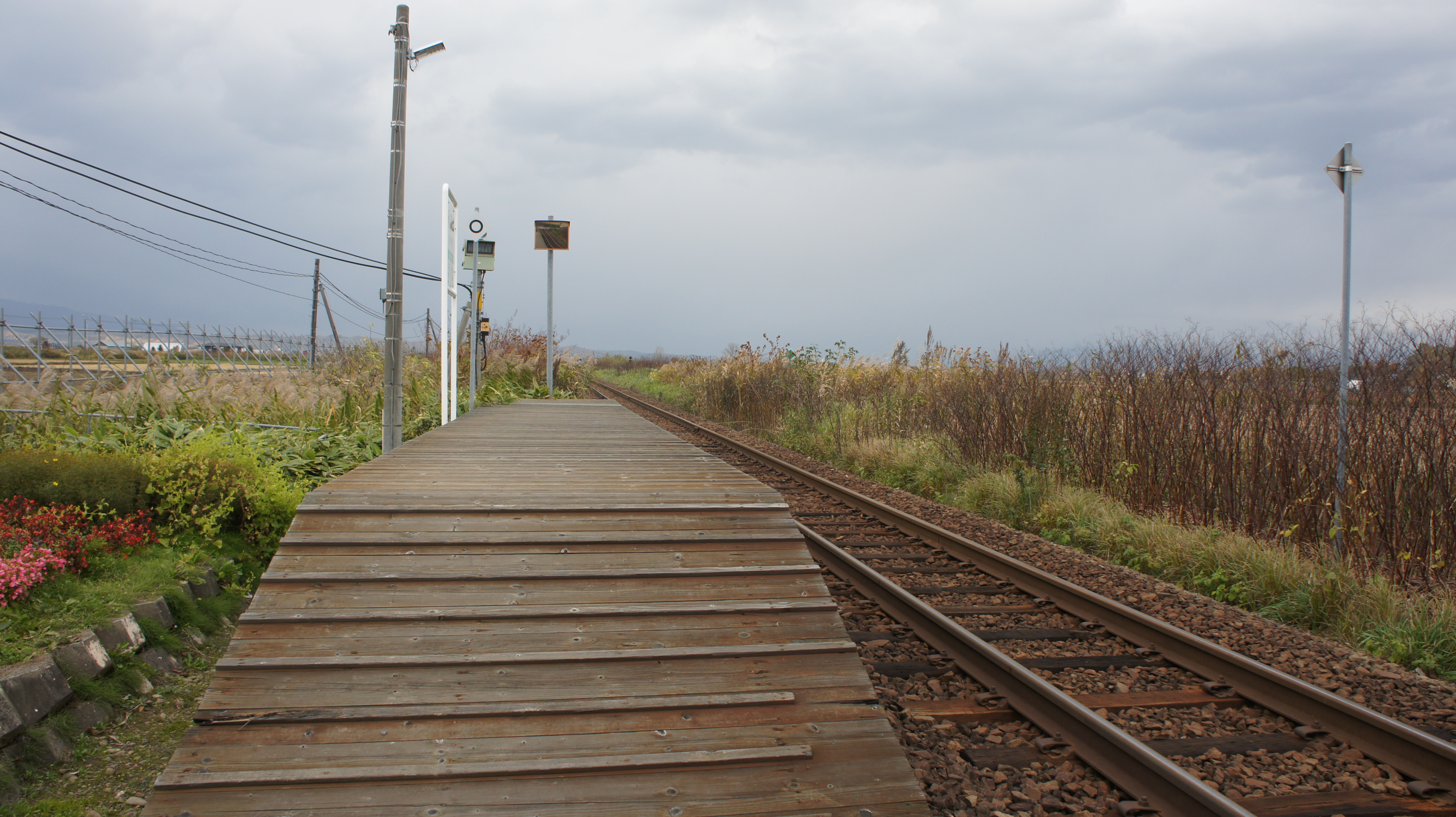
Platform

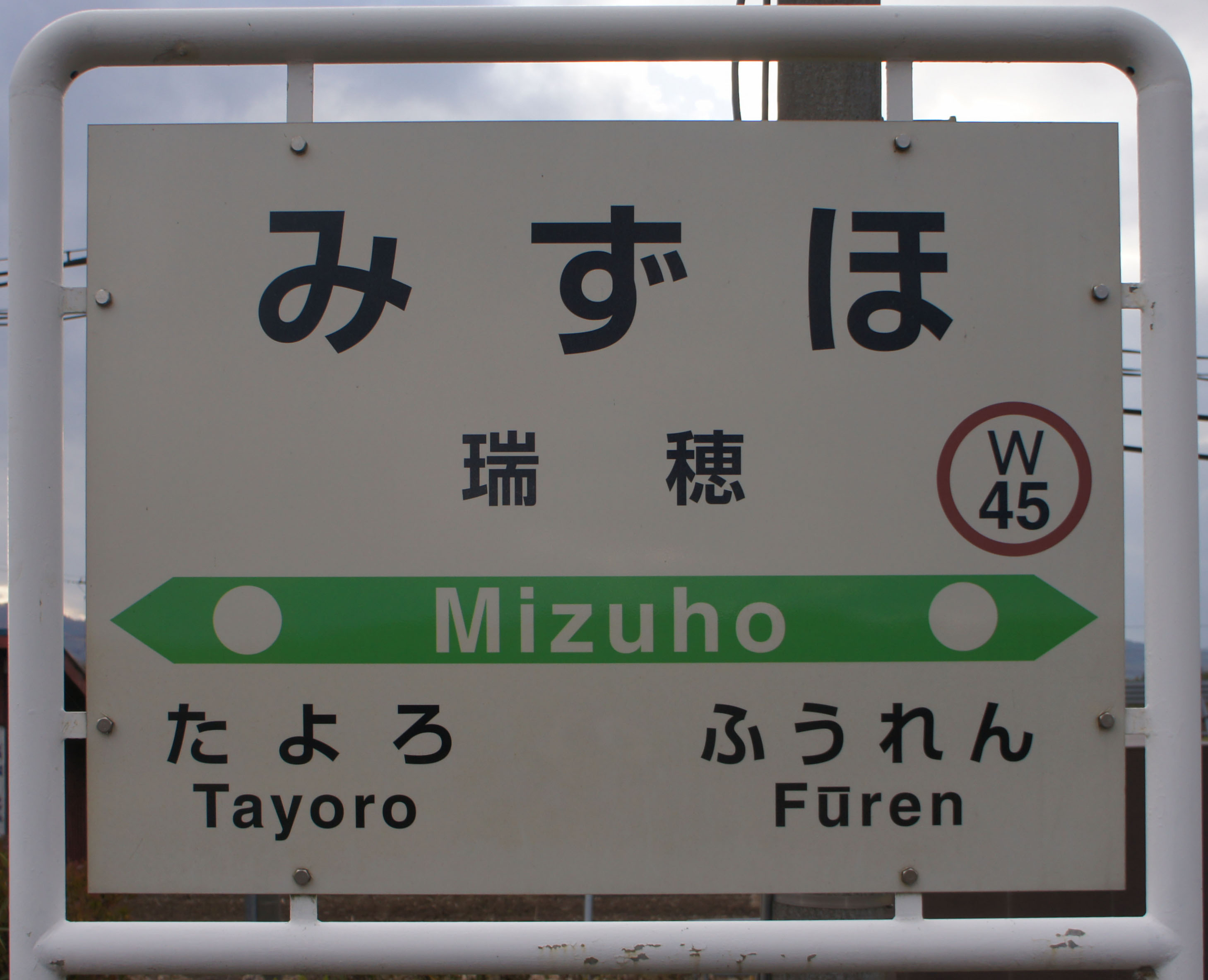
Signage

== History ==
The station was opened as on 1 September 1956 as a temporary station. With the privatization of Japanese National Railways (JNR) on 1 April 1987, it was raised to a full passenger train station, and came under the control of JR Hokkaido. In June 2023, this station was selected to be among 42 stations on the JR Hokkaido network to be slated for abolition.

The station will close in March 2027.

== Passenger statistics ==
During fiscal 2022, the station was used on average less than 3 passengers daily.

== Surrounding area ==
- Japan National Route 40

== See also ==
- List of railway stations in Japan
