= Bakkai Station =

Railway station in Wakkanai, Hokkaido, Japan

W78 Bakkai Station 抜海駅
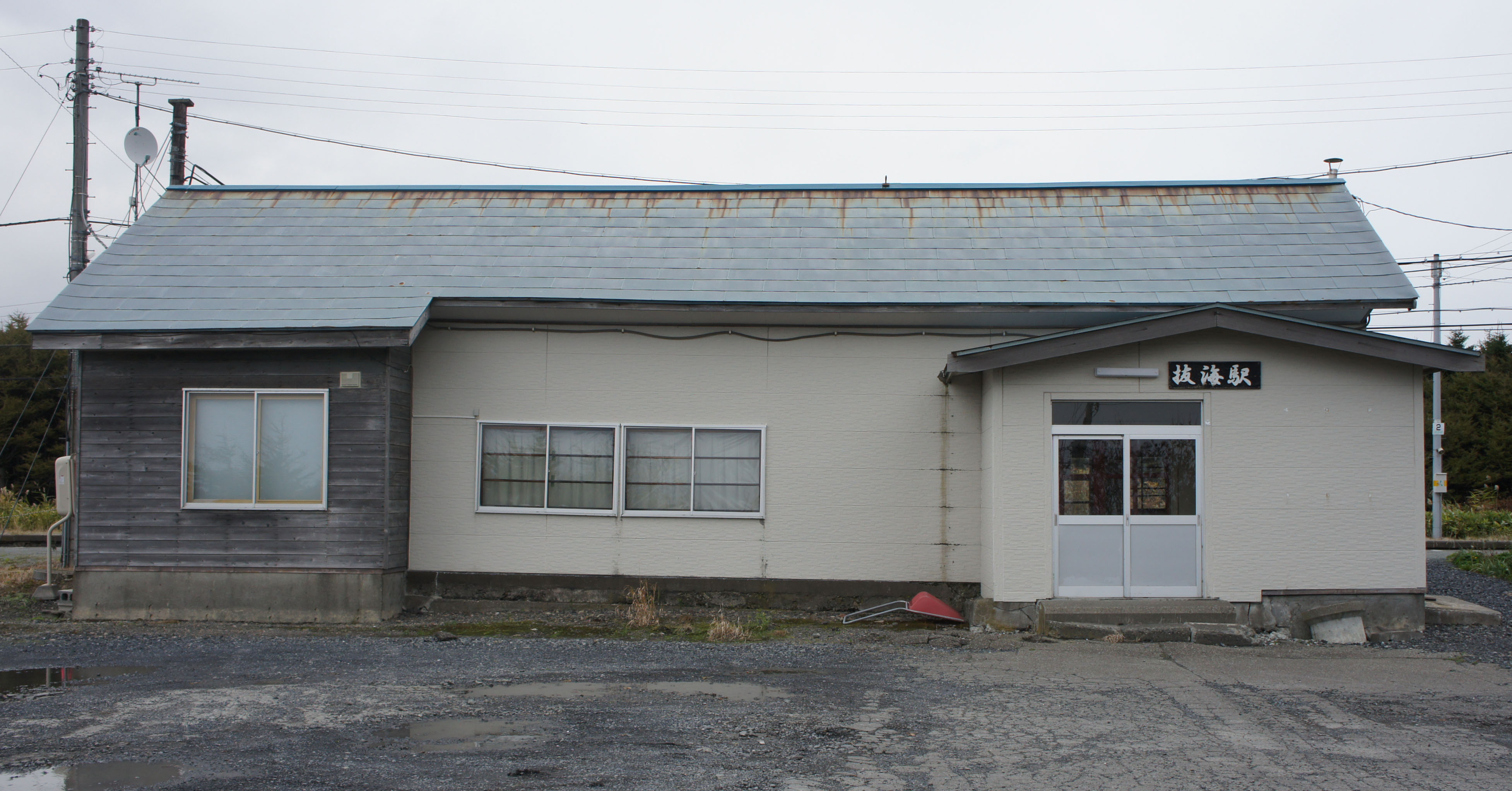
- Bakkai Station in October 2017

General information
- Location: Kutonebetsu, Bakkai-mura, Wakkanai-shi, Hokkaido 097-0036; Japan
- Coordinates: 45°19′0.7″N 141°38′40.4″E
- System: regional rail
- Operator: JR Hokkaido
- Line: Sōya Main Line
- Distance: 245.0 km (152.2 mi) from Asahikawa
- Platforms: 2 side platforms

Construction
- Structure type: At grade
- Accessible: No

Other information
- Status: Unstaffed
- Station code: W78
- Website: Official website

History
- Opened: 25 June 1924
- Closed: 14 March 2025

Passengers
- FY2020: 2.6 daily

Services
| Preceding station | JR Hokkaido | Following station |
|---|---|---|
| Minami-Wakkanai W79 towards Wakkanai | Sōya Main Line Local | Yūchi W77 towards Asahikawa |
Location
- Location within Hokkaido Location within Japan

Bakkai Station (抜海駅, Bakkai-eki) was a railway station located in the city of Wakkanai, Hokkaidō, Japan. It was operated by JR Hokkaido.

On 14 March 2025, the station was closed due to low number of passengers.

== Lines ==
Bakkai Station was served by the 259.4 km (161.2 mi) Sōya Main Line from Asahikawa to Wakkanai, and lay 245.0 km from the starting point of the line at Asahikawa. The station was numbered "W78".

== Layout ==
Bakkai Station was a ground-level station with two opposed side platforms, which formed a passing loop on the otherwise single-track line. The platforms were linked by a level crossing for passengers. The station was unstaffed, and was the northernmost unstaffed station in Japan during the years before its closure.

=== Platforms ===
| 1 | ■ Soya Main Line | for Wakkanai |
| 2 | ■ Soya Main Line | for Horonobe and Nayoro |

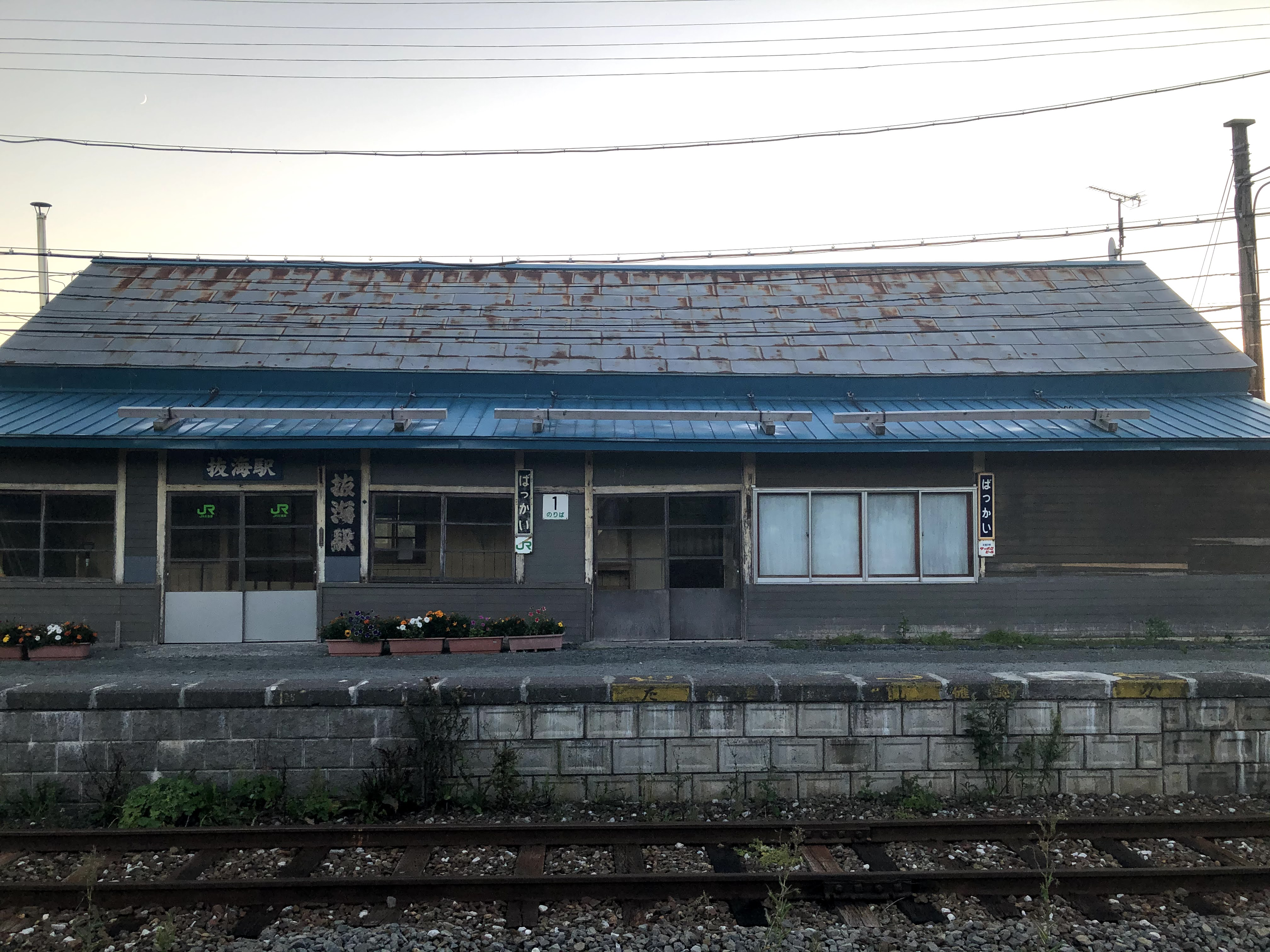
Bakkai Station building (From the platform side)

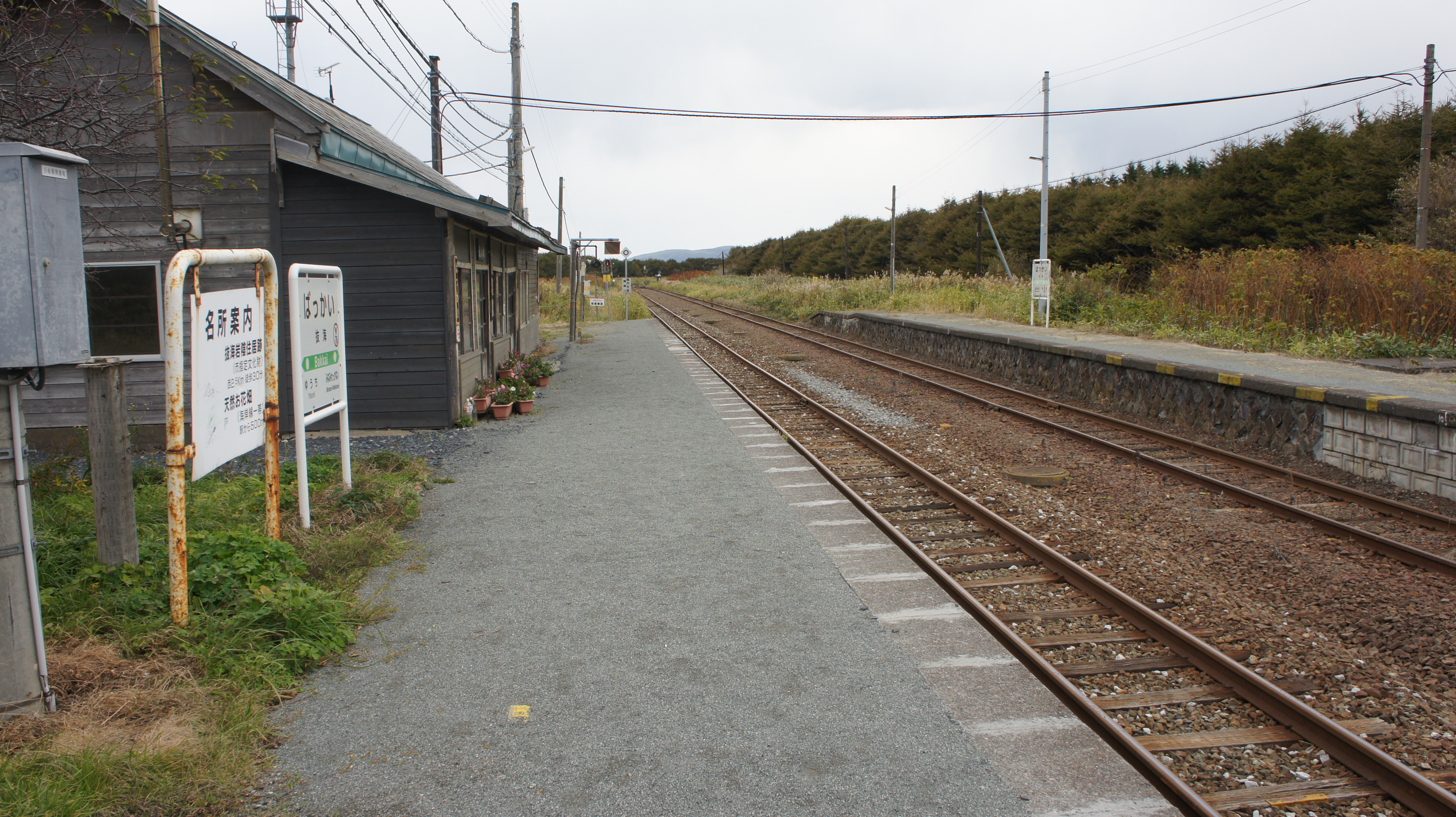
The platforms in October 2017

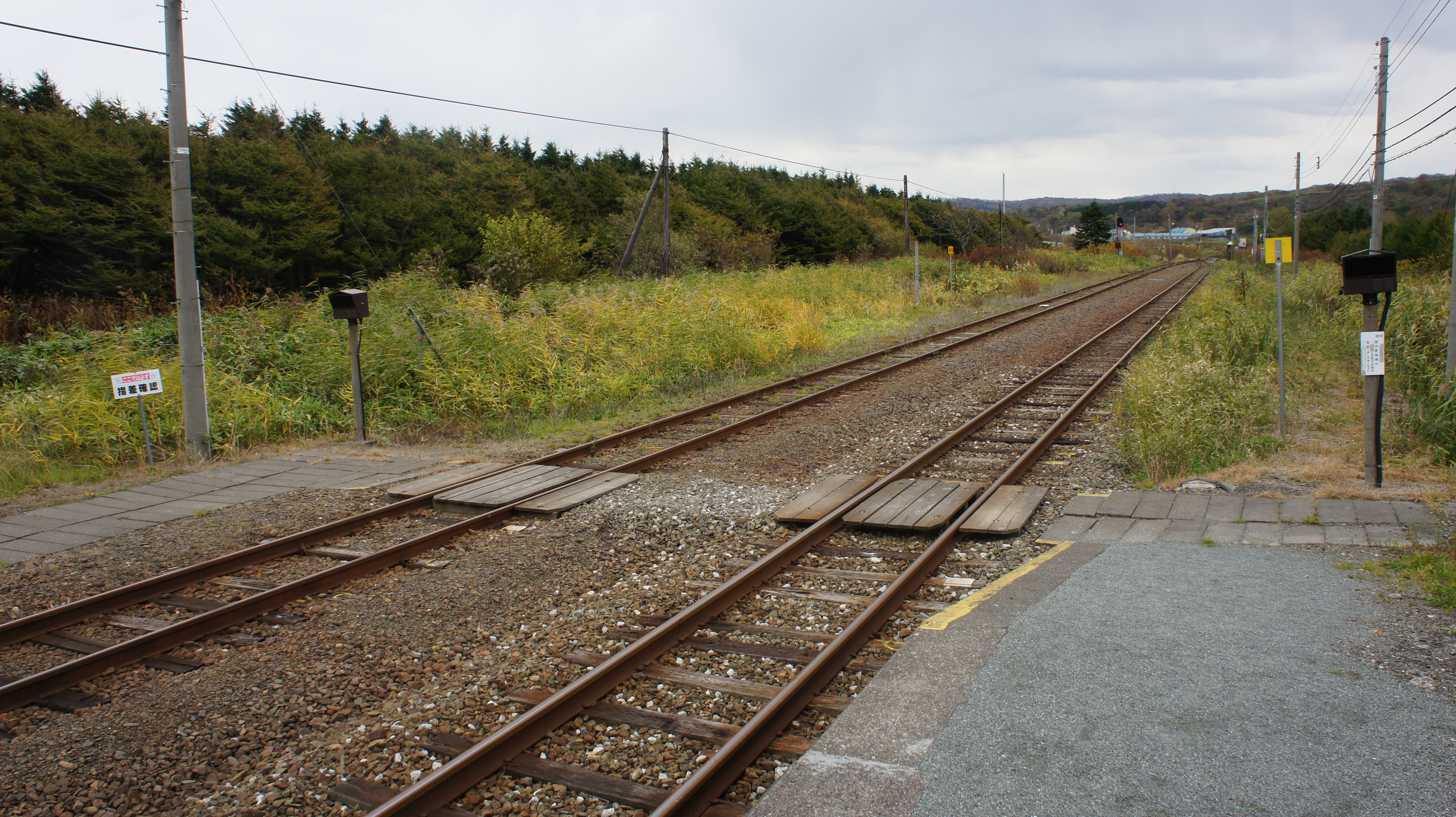
The passenger level crossing between the platforms in October 2017

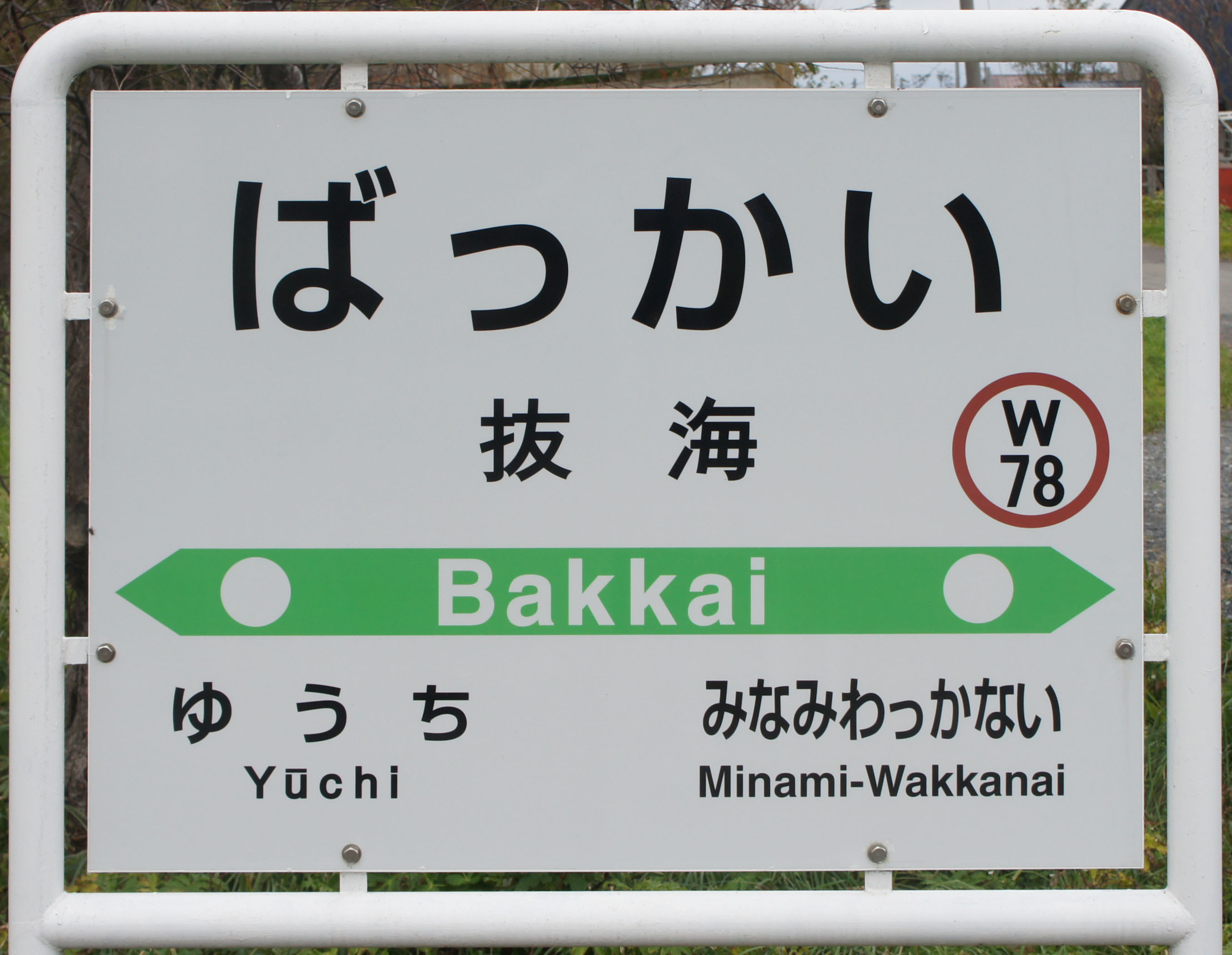
Signboard

== History ==
The station opened on 25 June 1924 with the opening of the Japanese Government Railways (JGR) Teshio North Line between Wakkanai Station (now Minami-Wakkanai Station) and Kabutonuma Station. On 25 September 1926 the Teshio South Line and Teshio North Line were merged and the line name was changed to Teshio Line, and on 1 April 1930 the Teshio Line was incorporated into the Sōya Main Line . With the privatization of Japanese National Railways (JNR), the successor of JGR, on 1 April 1987, JR Hokkaido took over control of the station.

In June 2023, this station was selected to be among 42 stations on the JR Hokkaido network to be slated for abolition owing to low ridership. The station was officially closed down on 14 March 2025.

== Passenger statistics ==
In fiscal 2020, the station was used by an average of 3.8 passengers daily.

== Surrounding area ==
The station was located in the Kutonebetsu district on a hill approximately two kilometers inland away from the coastal settlement of Bakkai (former Bakkai Village). In front of the station, weeds grew everywhere except the road, and there were only a few dilapidated houses and sheds, no stores. Hokkaido Highway 510 Bakkai Kabutonuma Station Line passed near the station.

== See also ==
- List of railway stations in Japan
