= W78 (disambiguation) =

The W78 is an American thermonuclear warhead.

W78 may also refer to:

- Bakkai Station, in Hokkaido, Japan
- Cubohemioctahedron
- Cygnus Loop, a supernova remnant
