= W76 (disambiguation) =

The W76 is an American thermonuclear warhead.

W76 may also refer to:

- Kabutonuma Station, in Hokkaido, Japan
- Rhombidodecadodecahedron, polyhedron with 54 faces
