= W77 =

W77 may refer to:

- Great cubicuboctahedron
- Yūchi Station, in Hokkaido, Japan
