= Minami-Wakkanai Station =

Railway station in Wakkanai, Hokkaido, Japan

W79 Minami-Wakkanai Station 南稚内駅
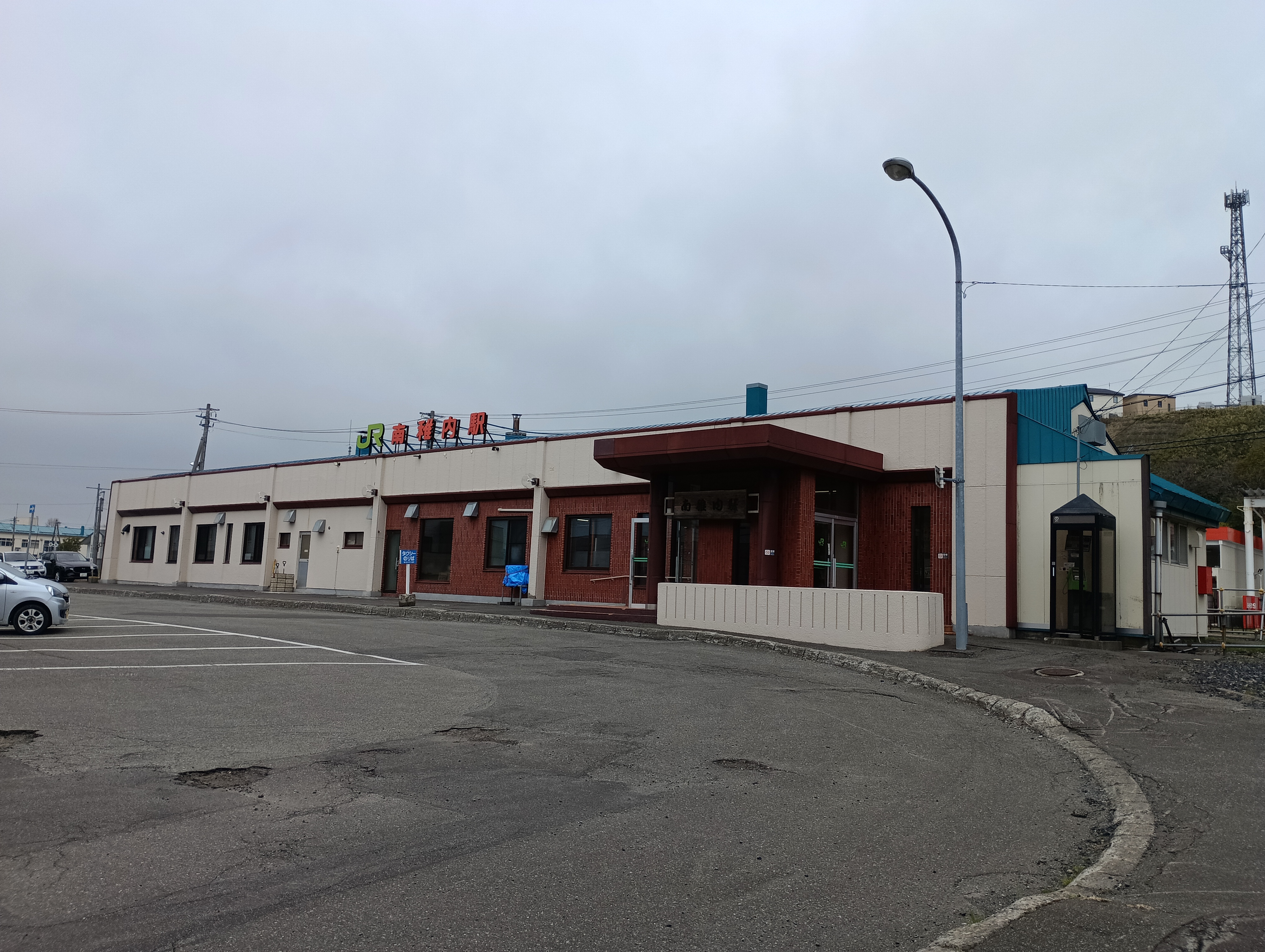
- Minami-Wakkanai Station in May 2026

General information
- Location: 1-8 Daikoku, Wakkanai-shi, Hokkaido 097-0005; Japan
- Coordinates: 45°23′53.5″N 141°40′58.8″E
- System: regional rail
- Operator: JR Hokkaido
- Line: Sōya Main Line
- Distance: 256.7 km (159.5 mi) from Asahikawa
- Platforms: 2 side platforms

Other information
- Status: Staffed (Midori no Madoguchi)
- Station code: W79
- Website: Official website

History
- Opened: 1 November 1922
- Former names: Wakkanai (until 1939)

Passengers
- FY2023: 82 (daily)

Services
Preceding station	JR Hokkaido	Following station
Wakkanai W80 Terminus	Sōya Main Line Local	Yūchi W77 towards Asahikawa
Wakkanai W80 Terminus	Sōya Main Line Sōya / Sarobetsu	Toyotomi W74 towards Asahikawa
Location
- Location within Hokkaido Location within Japan

Minami-Wakkanai Station (南稚内駅, Minami-Wakkanai-eki) is a railway station located in the city of Wakkanai, Hokkaidō, Japan. It is operated by JR Hokkaido. The station is numbered "W79".

== Lines ==
Minami-Wakkanai Station is served by the 259.4 km (161.2 mi) Sōya Main Line from Asahikawa to Wakkanai, and lies 256.7 km from the starting point of the line at Asahikawa. Sōya and Sarobetsu limited express trains stop at this station.

== Layout ==
This is an interchange station with two tracks and one side platform and one island platform (used on one side), connected by a footbridge. Trains generally enter platform 1 on the station building side, and platform 2 on the inside of the island platform is only used when trains, including non-return trains, need to pass each other. Since 2010, the track has been converted to a single track from this station to the end of the track at Wakkanai Station, making this the northernmost station in Japan to have switches, departure signals, and in-station signals.

=== Platforms ===
1	■ Sōya Main Line	for Horonobe and Nayoro for Wakkanai
2	■ Sōya Main Line	<infrequent use for passing trains>

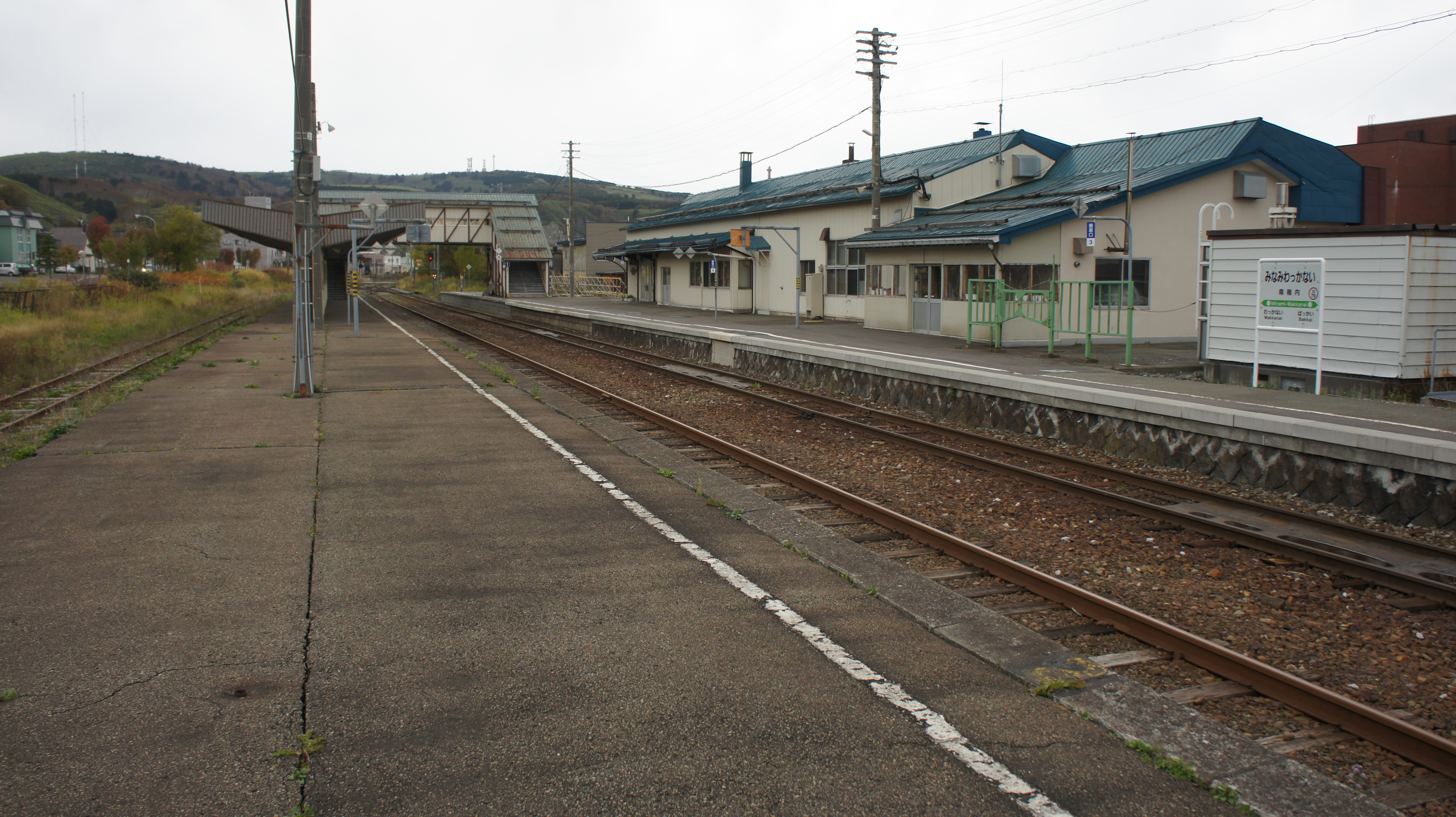
Platform

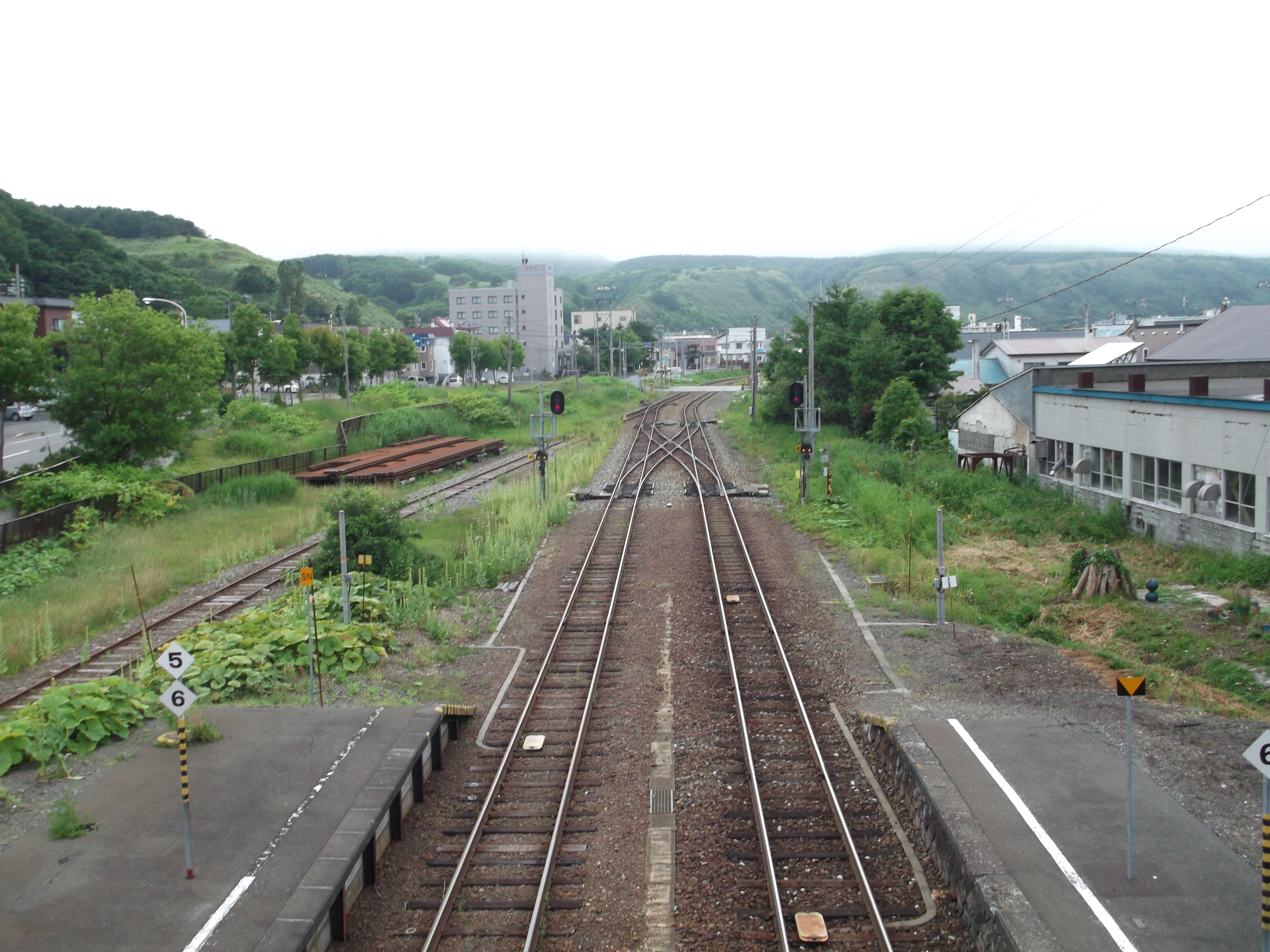
View of tracks from footbridge

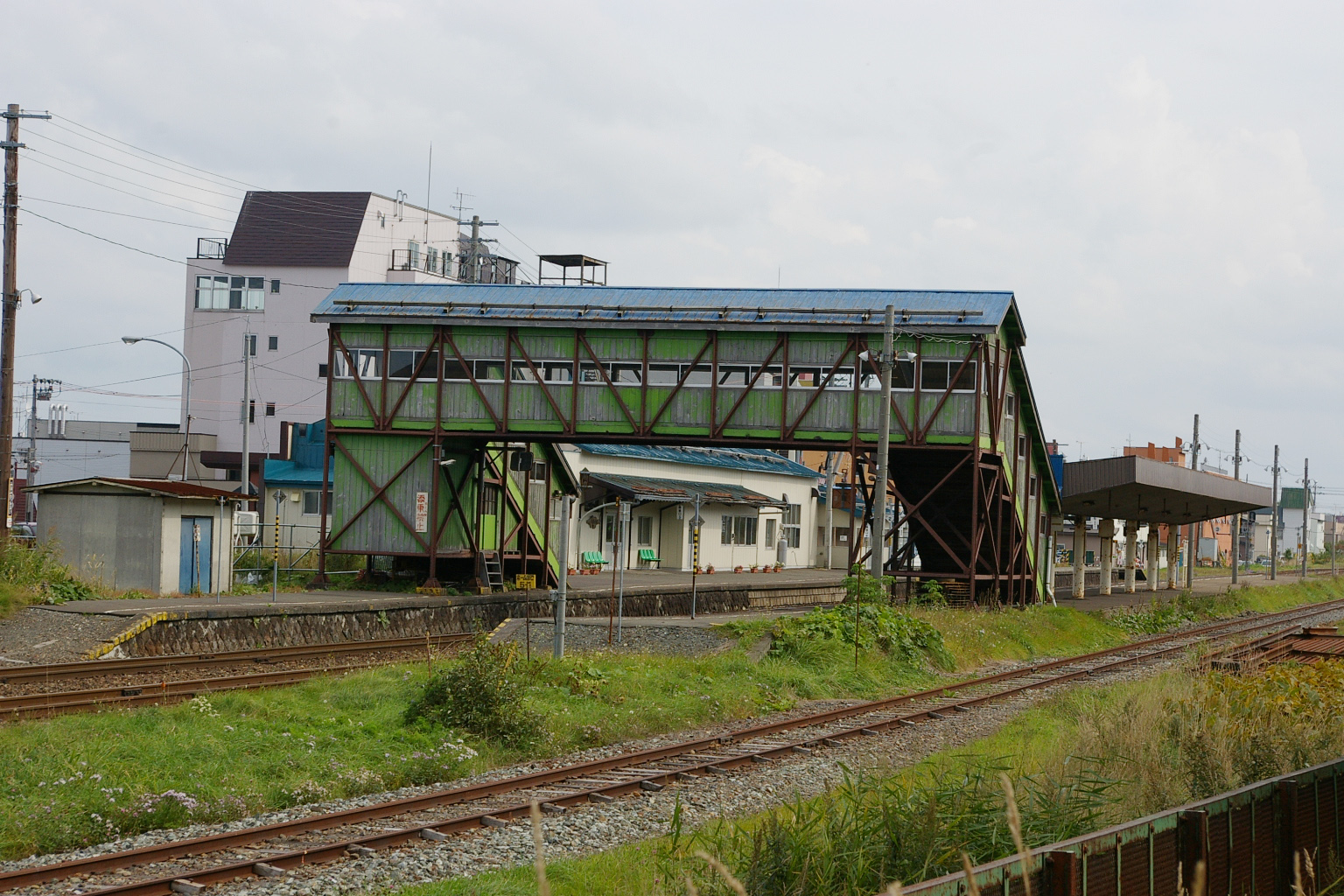
Station from across the railroad bridge

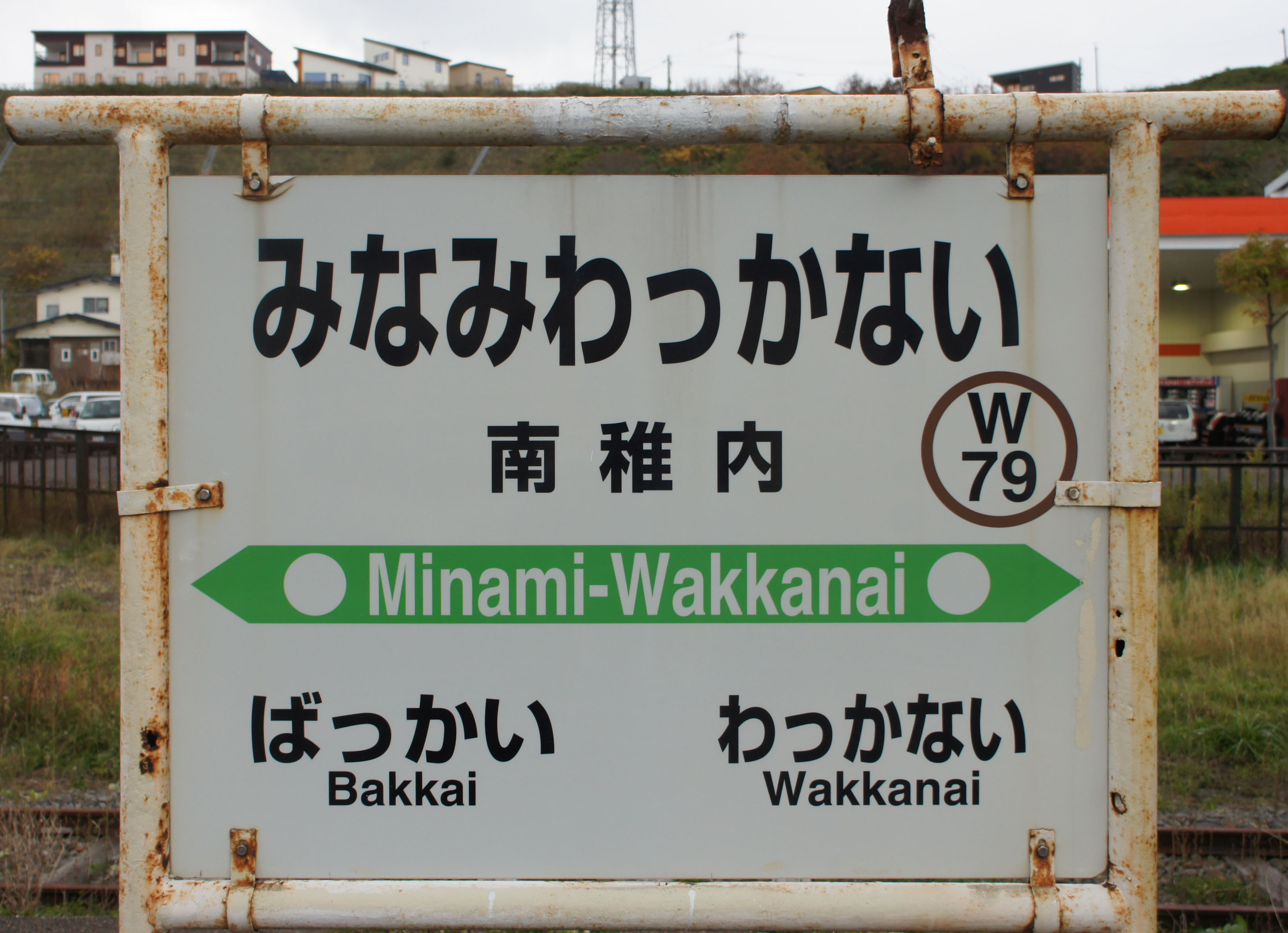
Station sign

== History ==
The station opened on 1 November 1922, initially named Wakkanai Station (稚内駅), with the opening of the Japanese Government Railways (JGR) Tempoku Line between this station and Onishibetsu Station. On 25 June 1924 the track between this station and Kabutonuma on the Teshio Kita Line opened. On 25 September 1926 the Teshio Minami Line and Teshio Kita Line were merged and the line name was changed to Teshio Line. The line was further extended to Wakkanai Minato Station (稚内港駅) (current Wakkanai Station) on 26 December 1928 and on April 1, 1930 the Teshio Line was incorporated into the Sōya Main Line. It was renamed Minami-Wakkanai on 1 February 1939 at the same time as Wakkanai Minato Station was renamed Wakkanai Station.

On 6 November 1952 the station was relocated, moving approximately 1 one kilometer from Wakkanai city center to near the junction of the Soya Main Line and Tempoku Line. The station building was enlarged and modernized in March 1978. With the privatization of Japanese National Railways (JNR) on 1 April 1987, the station came under the control of JR Hokkaido. The Tempoku Line was abolished on 1 May 1989.

== Passenger statistics ==
In FY2023, the station was used by an average of 82 passengers daily. (Note: Data published by the Ministry of Land, Infrastructure, Transport and Tourism state the number of passengers boarding and disembarking by station in a given year. FY2023 covers the period from 1 April 2023 to 31 March 2024. Data published by individual railways directly may state the number boarding only.)

== Surrounding area ==
- National Route 40
- National Route 238
- Sōya Joint Government Building
- Wakkanai Municipal Wakkanai Minami Junior High School
- Wakkanai Municipal Wakkanai Minato Elementary School

== See also ==
- List of railway stations in Japan
