= Kabutonuma Station =

Railway station in Toyotomi, Hokkaido, Japan

W76 Kabutonuma Station 兜沼駅
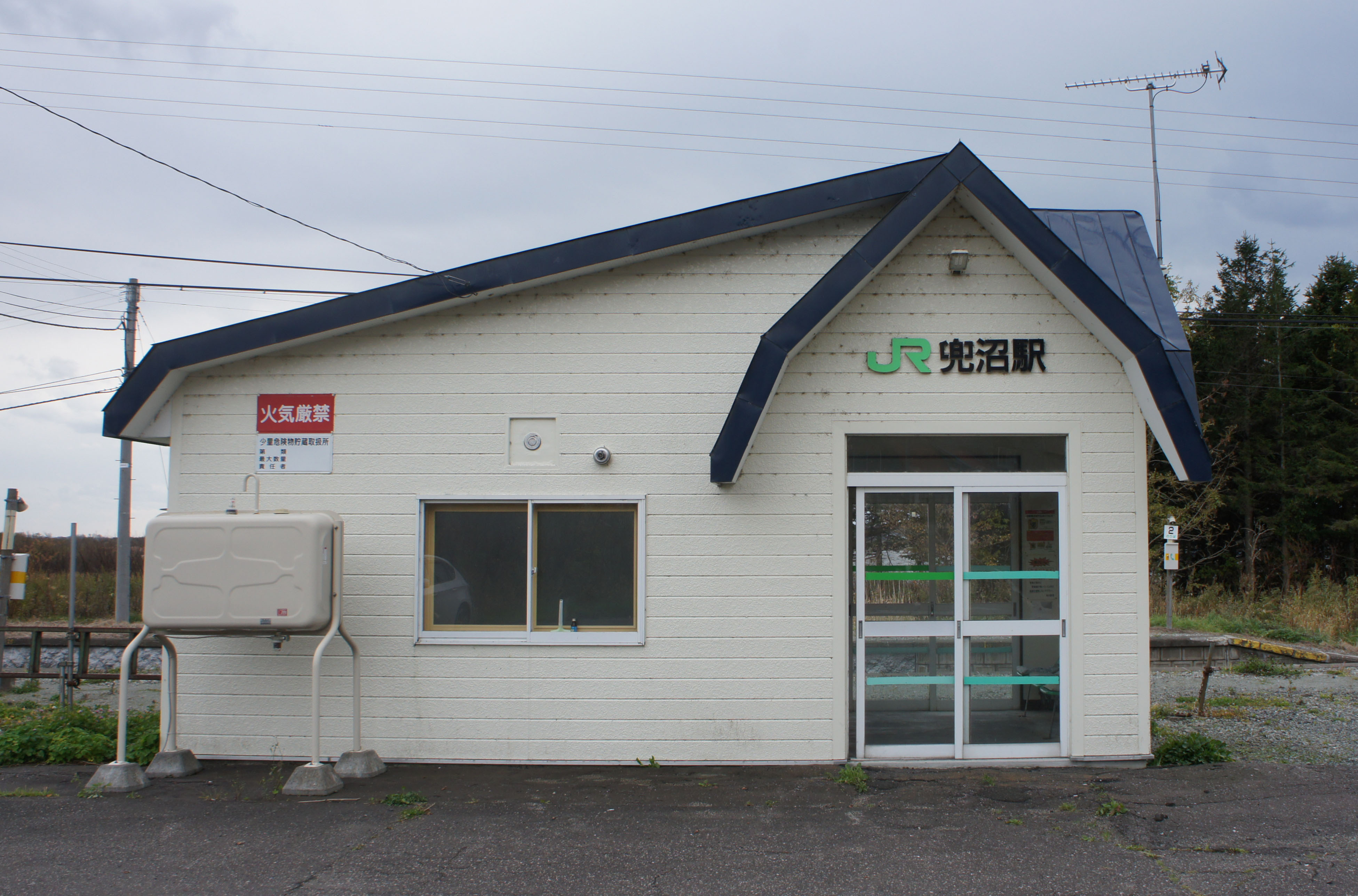
- Kabutonuma Station in October 2017

General information
- Location: 619 Kamisarobetsu, Toyotomi-chō, Teshio-gun, Hokkaidō 098-4451; Japan
- Coordinates: 45°13′12.9″N 141°41′50″E
- System: regional rail
- Operator: JR Hokkaido
- Line: Sōya Main Line
- Distance: 236.7 km (147.1 mi) from Asahikawa
- Platforms: 2 side platforms

Construction
- Structure type: At grade

Other information
- Status: Unstaffed
- Station code: W76
- Website: Official website

History
- Opened: 25 June 1924
- Rebuilt: 1988

Passengers
- 2022: 2.2 daily

Services
Preceding station	JR Hokkaido	Following station
Yūchi towards Wakkanai	Sōya Main Line Local	Toyotomi towards Asahikawa
Location
- Location within Hokkaido Location within Japan

Kabutonuma Station (兜沼駅, Kabutonuma-eki) is a railway station located in the town of Toyotomi, Hokkaidō, Japan. It is operated by JR Hokkaido.

== Lines ==
The station is served by the Sōya Main Line and is located 230.9 km from the starting point of the line at Asahikawa. Only local trains serve the station.

== Layout ==
Kabutonuma Station is a ground-level station with two side platforms and two tracks. The station building is located on the north side of platform 1, and the platforms are connected by a level crossing. In addition, as of March 1993, there was a freight siding that branched off from platform 1 toward Asahikawa and led to the freight platform in a cutout on the west side of the station building. The station building is unattended.

=== Platforms ===
1	■ Soya Main Line	for Wakkanai
2	■ Soya Main Line	for Horonobe and Nayoro

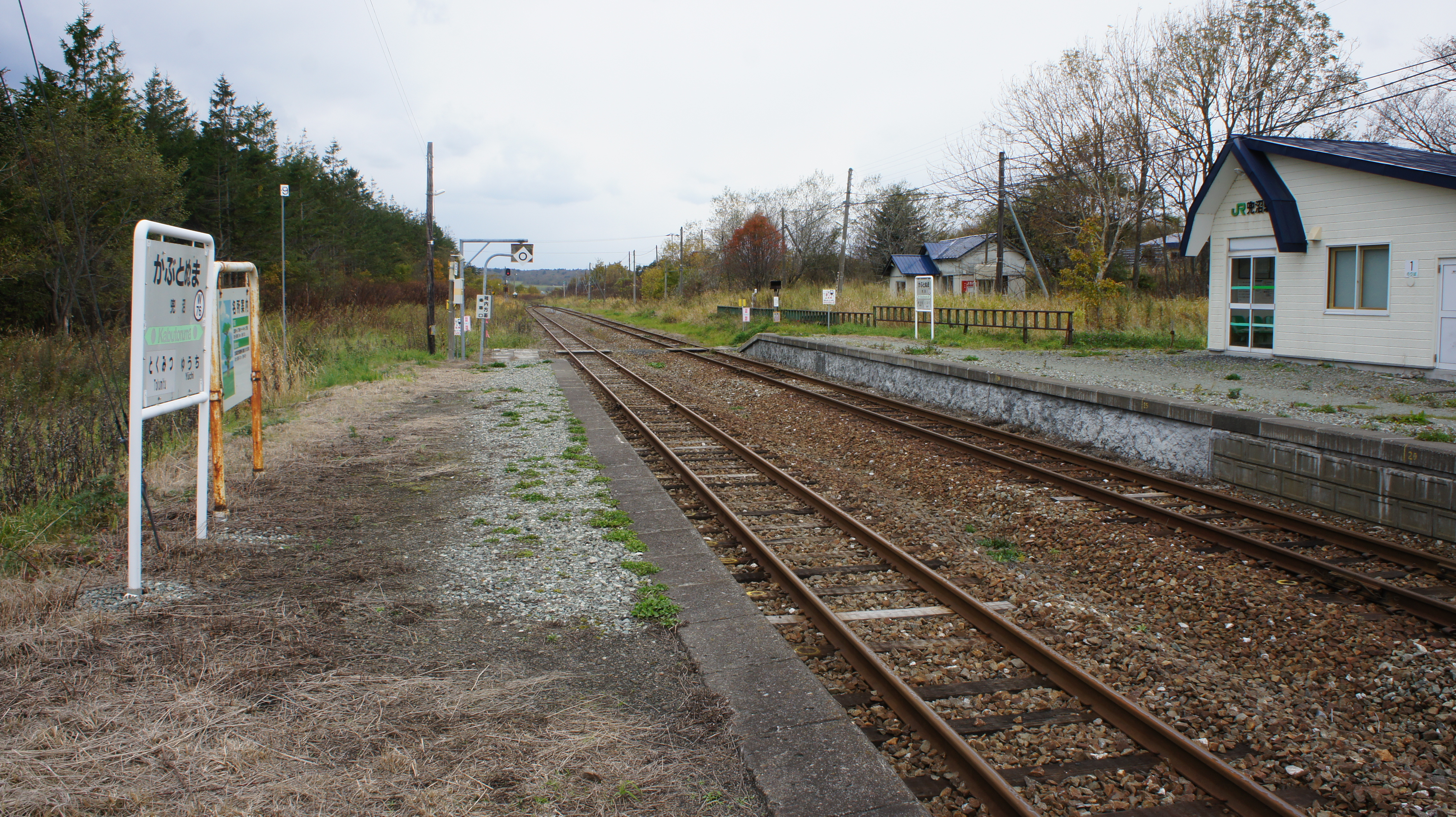
Platform

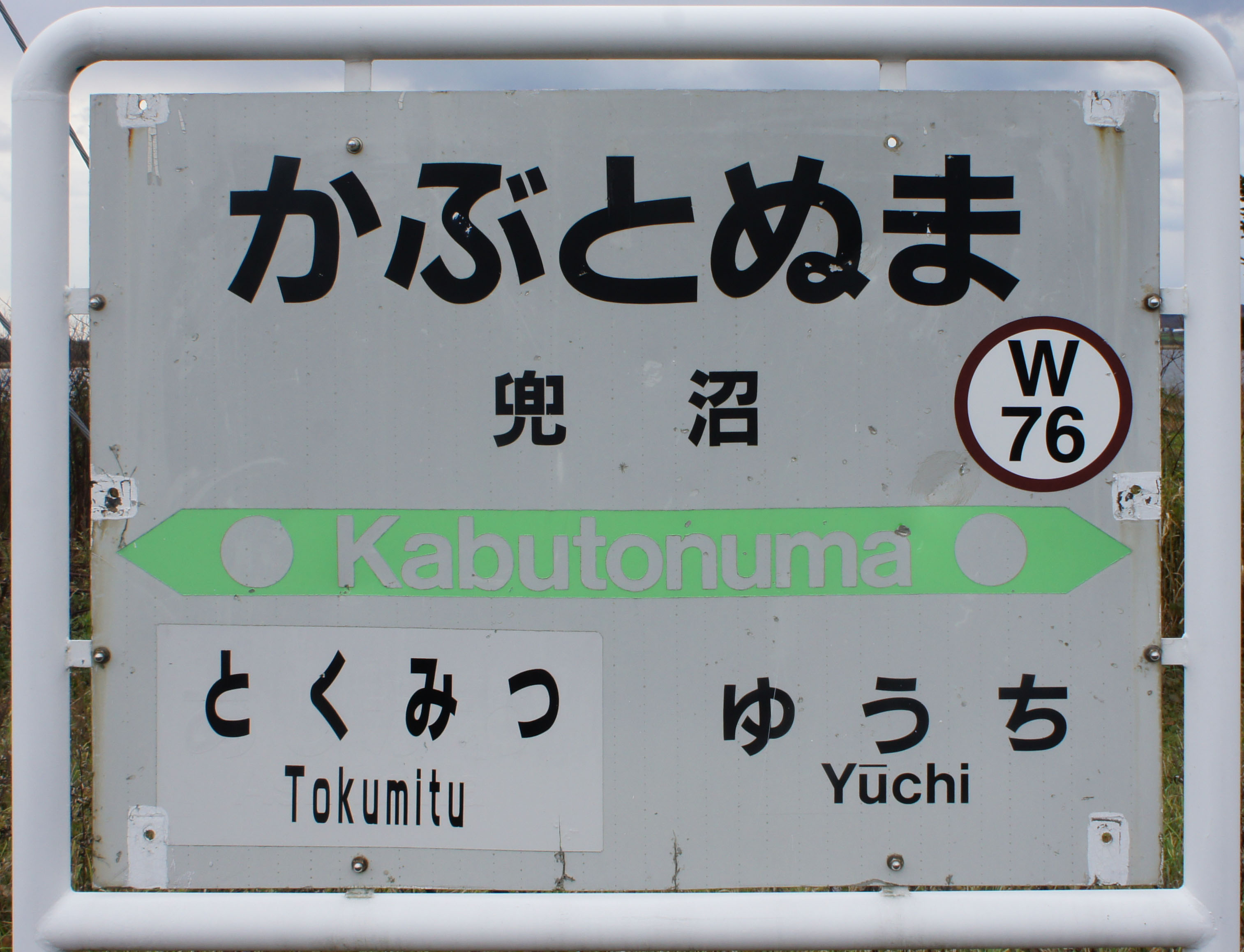
station signage

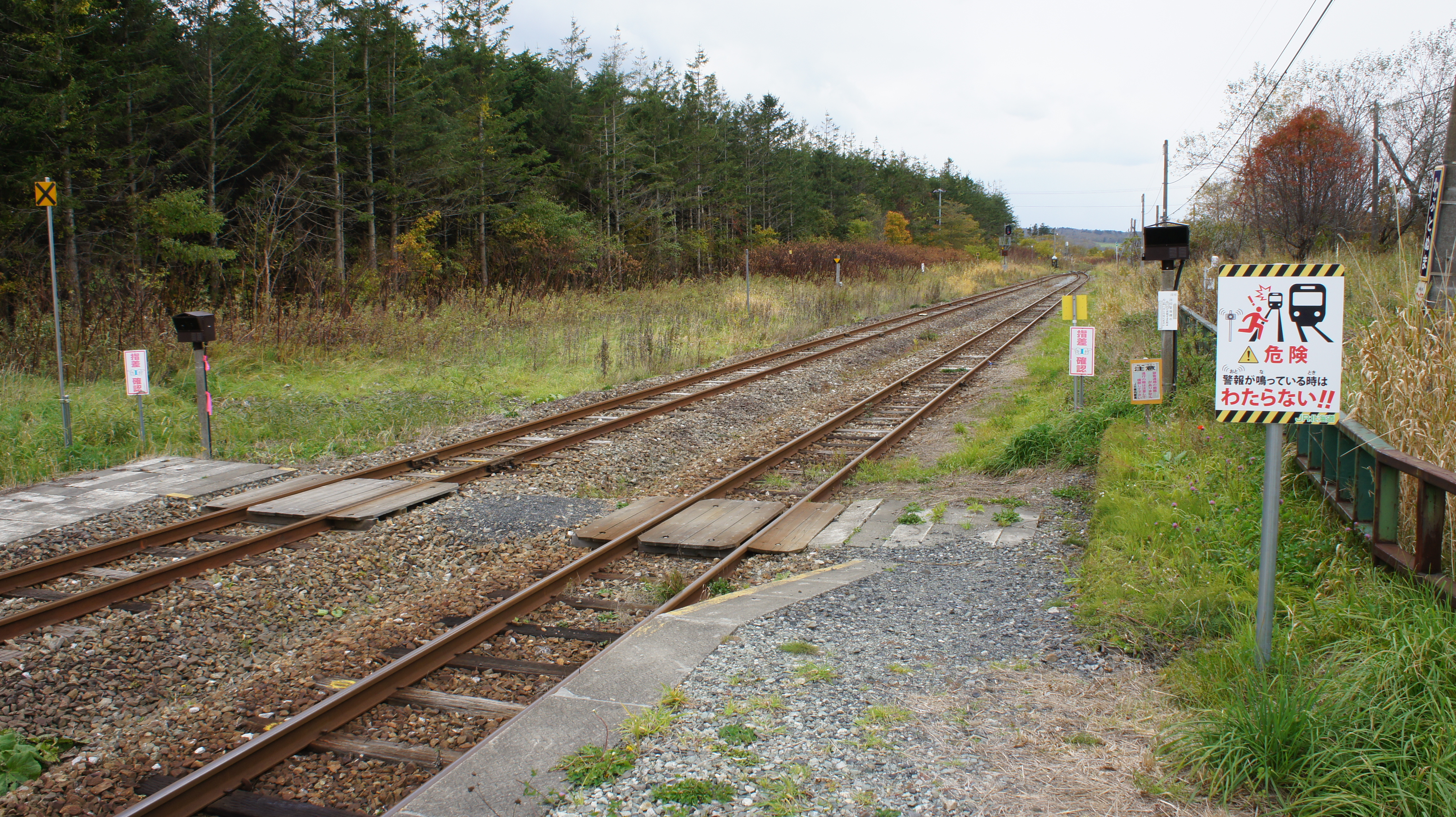
Level crossing

== History ==
The station was opened on 25 June 1924 with the opening of the Japanese Government Railways (JGR) Teshio Kita Line between Wakkanai Station (now Minami-Wakkanai Station) and Kabutonuma Station. On September 25, 1926 the Teshio Minami Line and Teshio Kita Line were merged and the line name was changed to Teshio Line, and on April 1, 1930 the Teshio Line was incorporated into the Sōya Main Line. With the privatization of Japanese National Railways (JNR), the successor of JGR, on 1 April 1987, JR Hokkaido took over control of the station.

=== Future plans ===
In June 2023, this station was selected to be among 42 stations on the JR Hokkaido network to be slated for abolition owing to low ridership.

== Passenger statistics ==
In fiscal 2022, the station was used by an average of 2.2 passengers daily.

== Surrounding area ==
- Toyotomi Town Office Kabutonuma Branch
- Toyotomi Town Kabutonuma Elementary and Junior High School
- Kabutonuma Park

== See also ==
- List of railway stations in Japan
