= Yūchi Station =

Railway station in Wakkanai, Hokkaido, Japan

W77 Yūchi Station 勇知駅
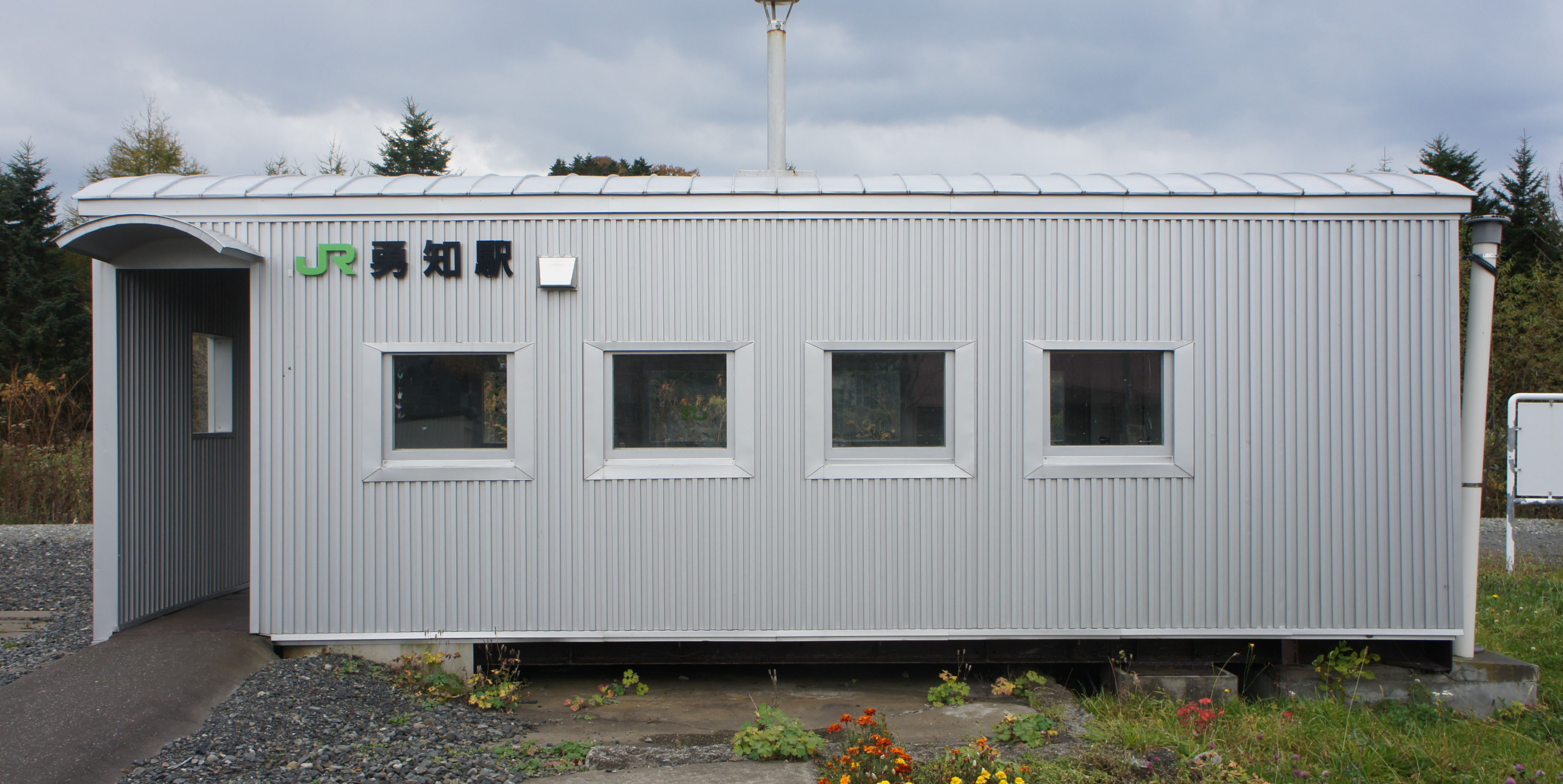
- Yūchi Station in October 2017

General information
- Location: Kamiyuchi Bakkaimura, Wakkanai, Hokkaido 098-4581; Japan
- Coordinates: 45°15′32.9″N 141°41′5.8″E
- System: regional rail
- Operator: JR Hokkaido
- Line: Sōya Main Line
- Distance: 236.7 km (147.1 mi) from Asahikawa
- Platforms: 1 side platform
- Tracks: 1

Construction
- Structure type: At grade

Other information
- Status: Unstaffed
- Station code: W77
- Website: Official website

History
- Opened: 25 June 1924
- Rebuilt: 1985

Passengers
- FY2020: 3.8 daily

Services
Preceding station	JR Hokkaido	Following station
Minami-Wakkanai W79 towards Wakkanai	Sōya Main Line Local	Kabutonuma W76 towards Asahikawa
Location
- Location within Hokkaido Location within Japan

Yūchi Station (勇知駅, Yūchi-eki) is a railway station located in the city of Wakkanai, Hokkaidō, Japan. It is operated by JR Hokkaido.

== Lines ==
The station is served by the Sōya Main Line and is located 236.7 km from the starting point of the line at Asahikawa. Only local trains serve the station.

== Layout ==
Yūchi Station is a ground-level station with one side platform and one track. The platform is located on the east side of the tracks (on the right hand side facing towards Wakkanai. Formerly, this station had two opposing side platforms and two tracks, allowing train interchange. There was also a siding on the side of track 1 that branched off from the Wakkanai side. At the time, the two platforms were connected by a level crossing. The station building is now a repurposed JNR Yo3500 series caboose. The station is unattended.

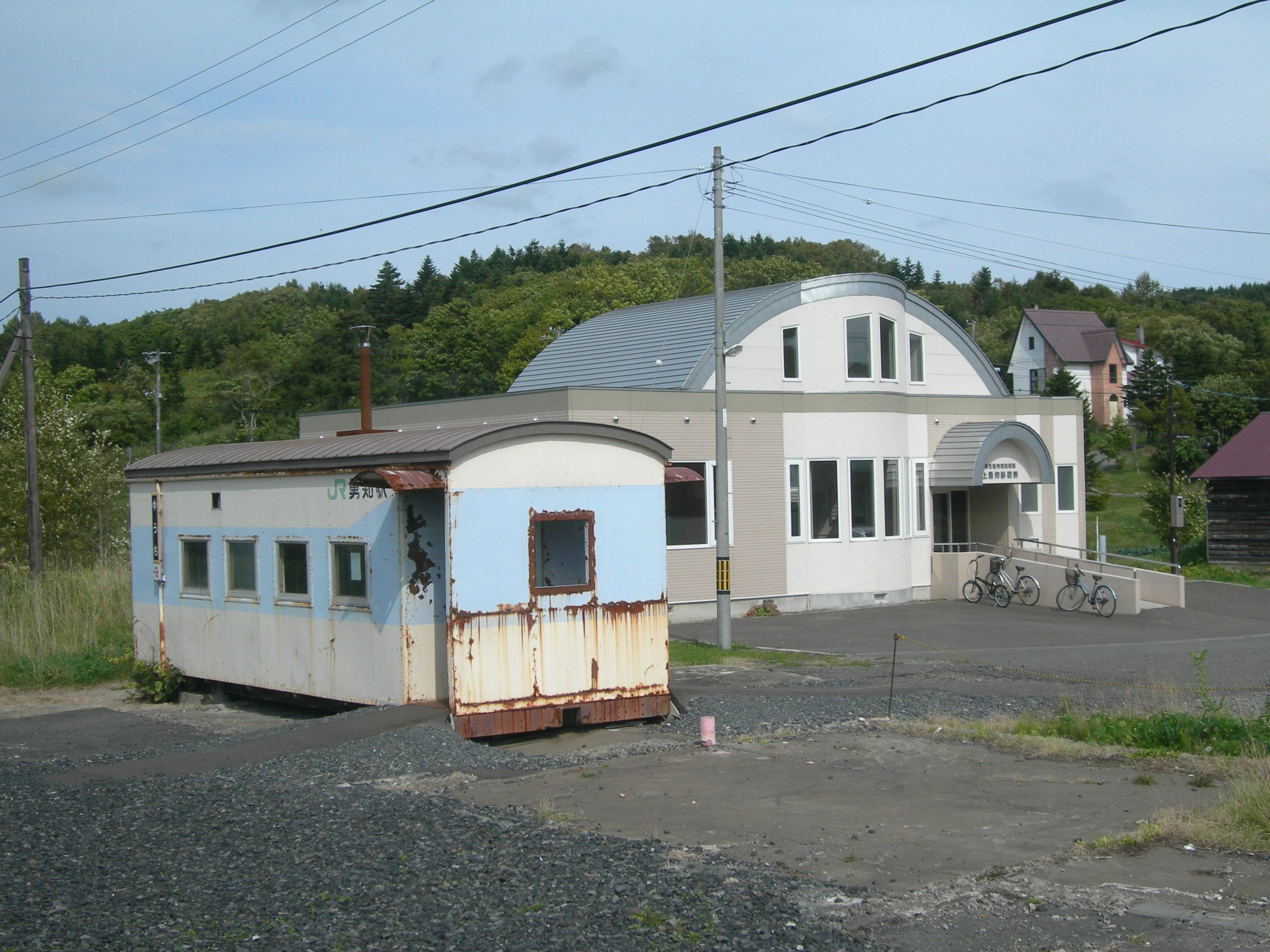
Former station building, made out of a Yo-3500 train car

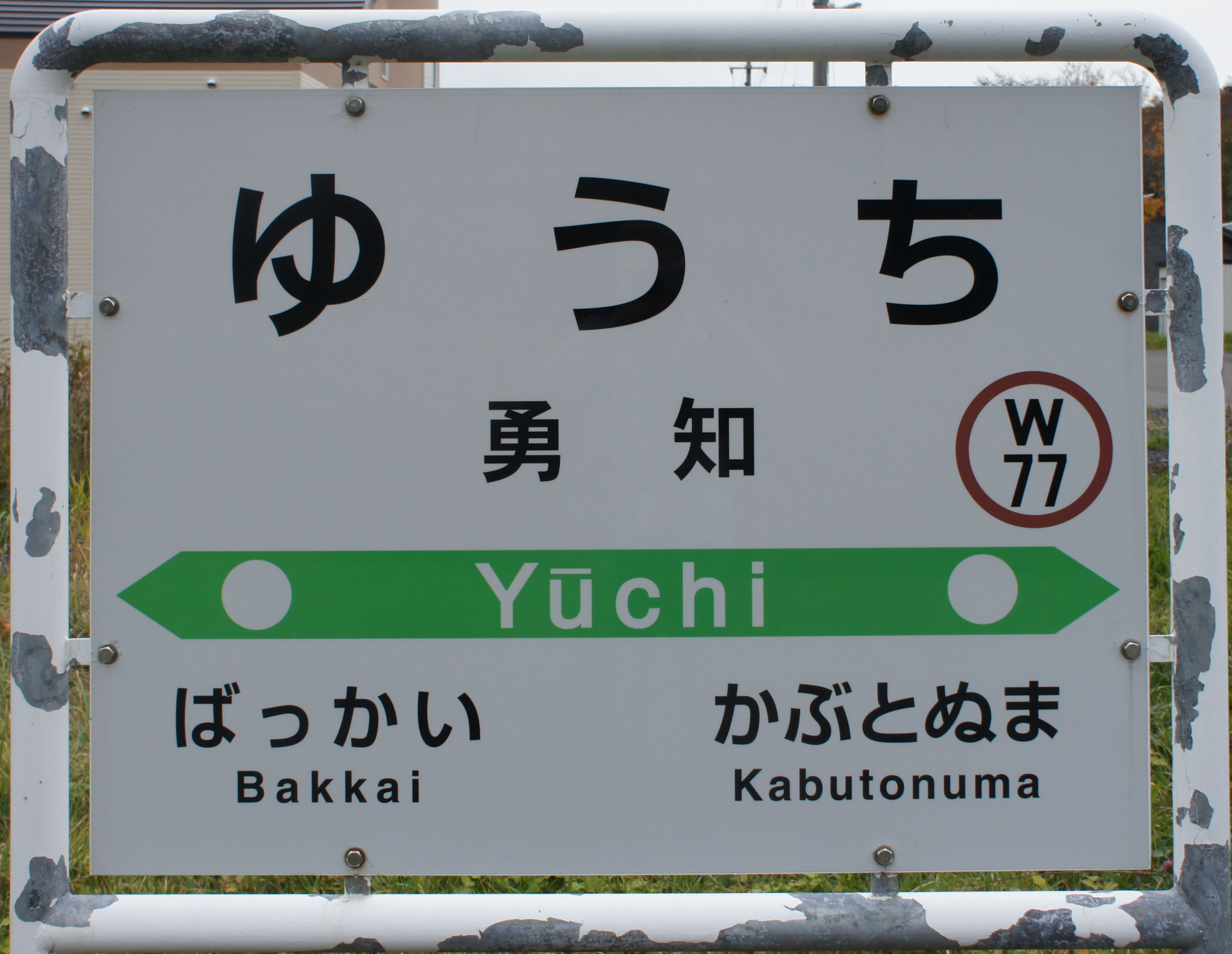
Station signage

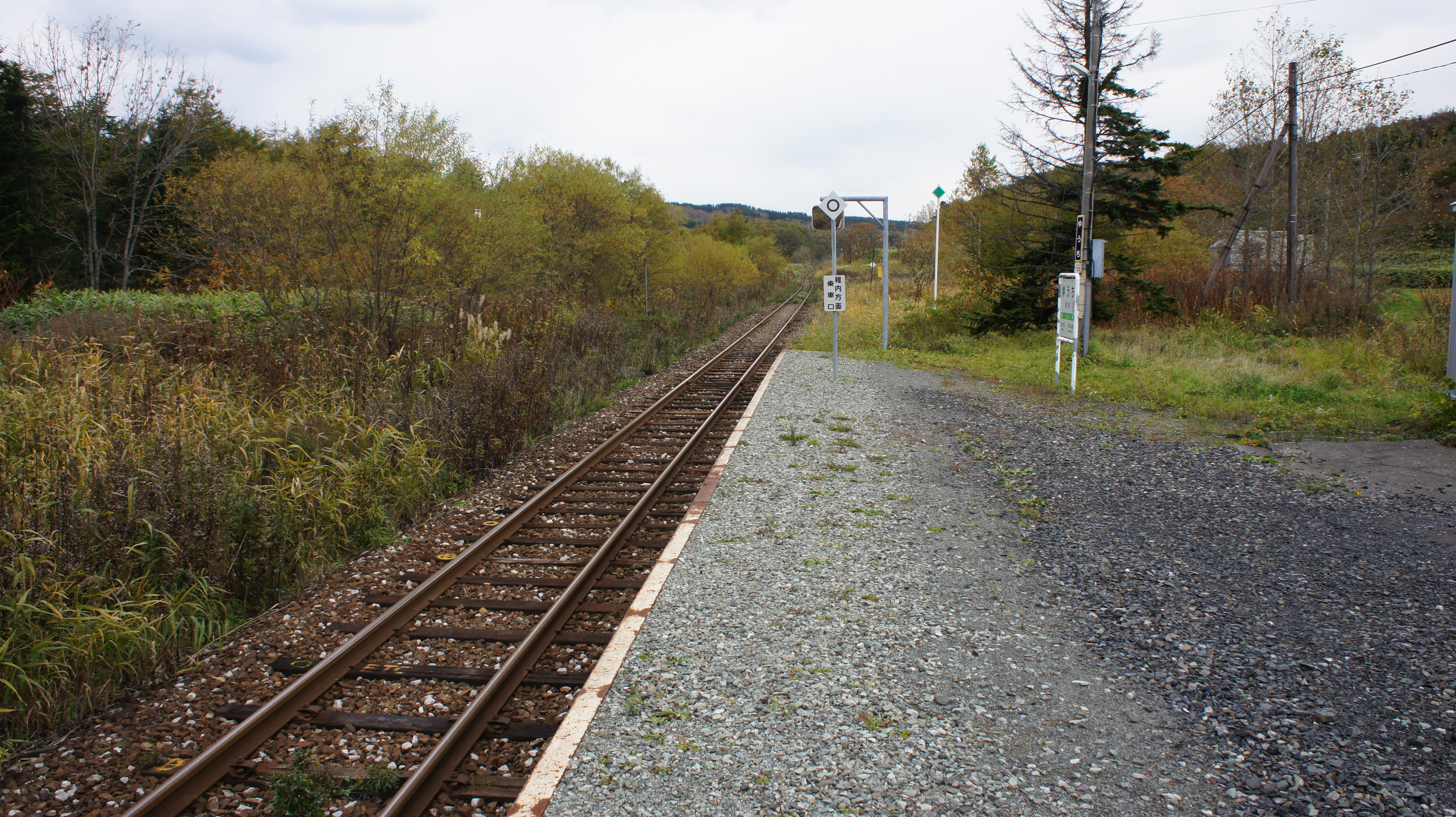
Platform

== History ==
The station was opened on 25 June 1924 with the opening of the Japanese Government Railways (JGR) Teshio Kita Line between Wakkanai Station (now Minami-Wakkanai Station) and Kabutonuma Station. On September 25, 1926 the Teshio Minami Line and Teshio Kita Line were merged and the line name was changed to Teshio Line, and on April 1, 1930 the Teshio Line was incorporated into the Sōya Main Line. With the privatization of Japanese National Railways (JNR), the successor of JGR, on 1 April 1987, JR Hokkaido took over control of the station.

== Passenger statistics ==
In fiscal 2020, the station was used by an average of 3.8 passengers daily.

== Surrounding area ==
- Yuchi Post Office
- Kamiyuchi Hometown Museum (using the abandoned buildings of Wakkanai City Kamiyuchi Elementary and Junior High School)

== See also ==
- List of railway stations in Japan
