= Colonisation of Hokkaido =

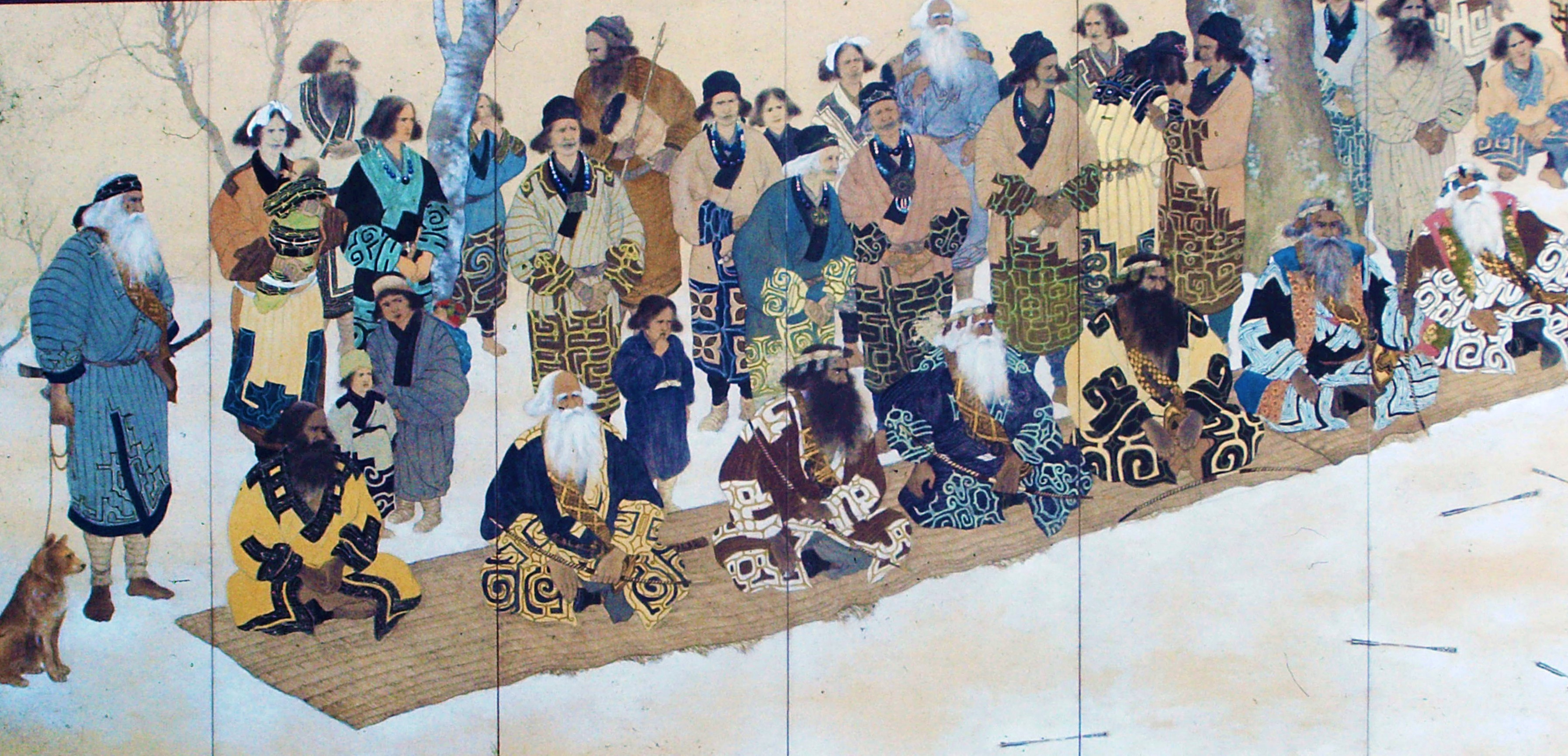
Ainu people, by Murase Yoshinori, 1918

The colonisation of Hokkaido was the process from around the fifteenth century by which the Yamato Japanese took control of Hokkaido and subjugated and assimilated the indigenous Ainu people, whose culture had developed from around the thirteenth century. The process of colonisation began with the trading of fish, furs, and silk between Japan and the Ainu. Despite rebellions against increasing Japanese influence in 1669 and in 1789, their control of the island steadily increased: by 1806, the Tokugawa shogunate directly controlled southern Hokkaido.

In 1869, just after the start of the Meiji era, a development commission was set up to encourage Yamato Japanese settlement on Hokkaido. Colonisation was seen as a solution to multiple problems: it would solve mass unemployment among the former samurai class, provide natural resources needed for industrialisation, ensure a defence against an expansionist Russian Empire, and increase Japan's prestige in the eyes of the West. American advisors were heavily involved in guiding and organising the process. The traditional Ainu subsistence lifestyle was replaced by large-scale farming and coal mining, with the native Ainu, along with political prisoners and indentured Koreans, women and children, forced to provide labour.

Colonisation dispossessed the native Ainu people of their lands and property. Widespread discrimination enforced against them, including their forced relocation into mountain areas and the prohibition of the use of the Ainu language, had the eventual aim of the extinction of Ainu culture and its replacement by Yamato Japanese culture. The process of colonisation and the resultant discrimination has been systematically denied or ignored by Japanese society.

== Background ==
=== Kamakura period ===
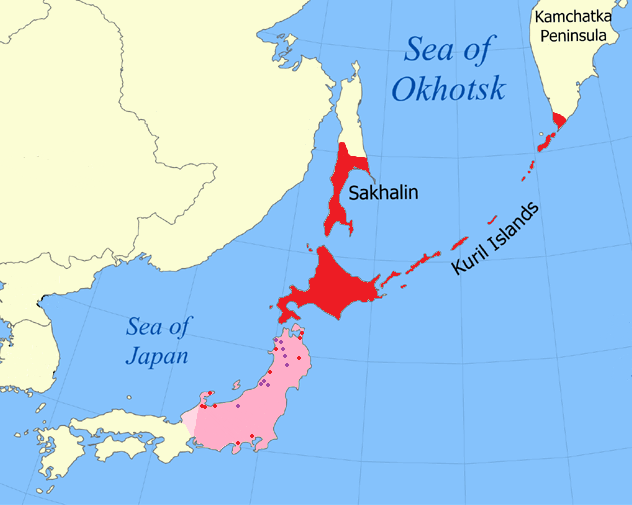
Ainu Moshiri, the traditional expanse of the Ainu people

From around the 13th century an identifiable Ainu cultural complex developed from and replaced the previous Satsumon and Okhotsk cultures in Hokkaido. It was also during this period that economic contact between the Yamato of Honshū and Ainu of Hokkaido began. The Yamato viewed the Ainu as "barbarians", with the contemporaneous Japanese name for the island of Hokkaido, Ezochi (蝦夷地) meaning either "land of the barbarians" or "the land for people who did not obey the government". The Ainu called the territory they inhabited Ainu Moshiri meaning "land of humans/land of the Ainu".

Before the colonisation of Hokkaido, the Yamato and early Japanese polities took control of the region of northern Honshū inhabited by the Emishi people.

By the fifteenth century Yamato fortified trading settlements known as date had been established around the Oshima Peninsula in southern Hokkaido. In 1456, the first recorded instance of fighting between the Ainu and Yamato occurred, building into Koshamain's War in 1457, leading to the destruction of many of the trading settlements. Through the sixteenth century the Yamato engaged in a campaign of inviting Ainu leaders and elders to peace talks, at which the Ainu were ambushed and killed. During this time the Kakizaki family took a leading role in the Yamato settlers on southern Hokkaido, establishing a monopoly of trade with the Ainu.

== Edo period ==
In 1599 the Kakizaki family took the name Matsumae. The Tokugawa shogunate officially granted the Matsumae clan exclusive rights to trade with the Ainu in the northern part of the island. Later, the Matsumae began to lease out trading rights to Yamato Japanese merchants, and contact between Yamato Japanese and Ainu became more extensive. Throughout this period, Ainu groups competed with each other to import goods from the Yamato Japanese, and epidemic diseases such as smallpox reduced the population.

In 1635, Matsumae Kinhiro, the second daimyō of the Matsumae Domain in Hokkaido, sent Murakami Kamonzaemon, Sato Kamoemon, and Kakizaki Hiroshige on an expedition to Sakhalin. One of the Matsumae explorers, Kodō Shōzaemon, stayed on the island during the winter of 1636 and sailed along the east coast to Taraika in the spring of 1637. From 1669 to 1672, Ainu chieftain Shakushain led a rebellion against the Matsumae clan. The rebellion began as a fight for resources between Shakushain's people and another Ainu clan led by Hae in the Shibuchari River basin. After Shakushain killed Hae's son, Hae sent emissaries to the Matsumae to request arms and potential remediation. While travelling back members of the emissaries died of smallpox, with reports reaching Hae and Shakushain that they had been poisoned by the Matsumae. As a result, Shakushain called on all the Ainu of Hokkaido to work together to fight the Matsumae. The Ainu coalition demanded complete political independence from the Matsumae and Yamato, and a return to the direct trading rights with Honshū, instead of the Matsumae mediated trade currently in place. The rebellion was eventually quashed, with Shogun Tokugawa Ienobu rewarding the Matsumae for this result. Historian Brett Walker highlights the rebellion as a watershed moment in the history of the Yamato Japanese conquest of Hokkaido, as it solidified the future involvement of Japanese state powers in colonising Hokkaido instead of it being left to the local Matsumae clan.

Through the Edo period the Matsumae developed the fishing industry in Hokkaido, where Yamato Japanese merchants oversaw Ainu fishers whose catch was processed and sold to the Yamato Japanese of Honshu. The Ainu working in this industry were forced into it, and subjected to rampant exploitation. The development of this industry also had wider ecological impacts, where the increased scale of fishing disrupted the subsistence fishing that many Ainu relied upon.

From 1669, the Matsumae had ships conduct trade with southern Sakhalin, while also exploring the island for exploitable resources. In an early colonisation attempt, a Yamato Japanese settlement called Ōtomari was established by the Matsumae on Sakhalin's southern end in 1679, to control trade with the Ainu and Nivkh who lived on Sakhalin, though trade on the island was still dominated by the Qing dynasty until the 1790s.

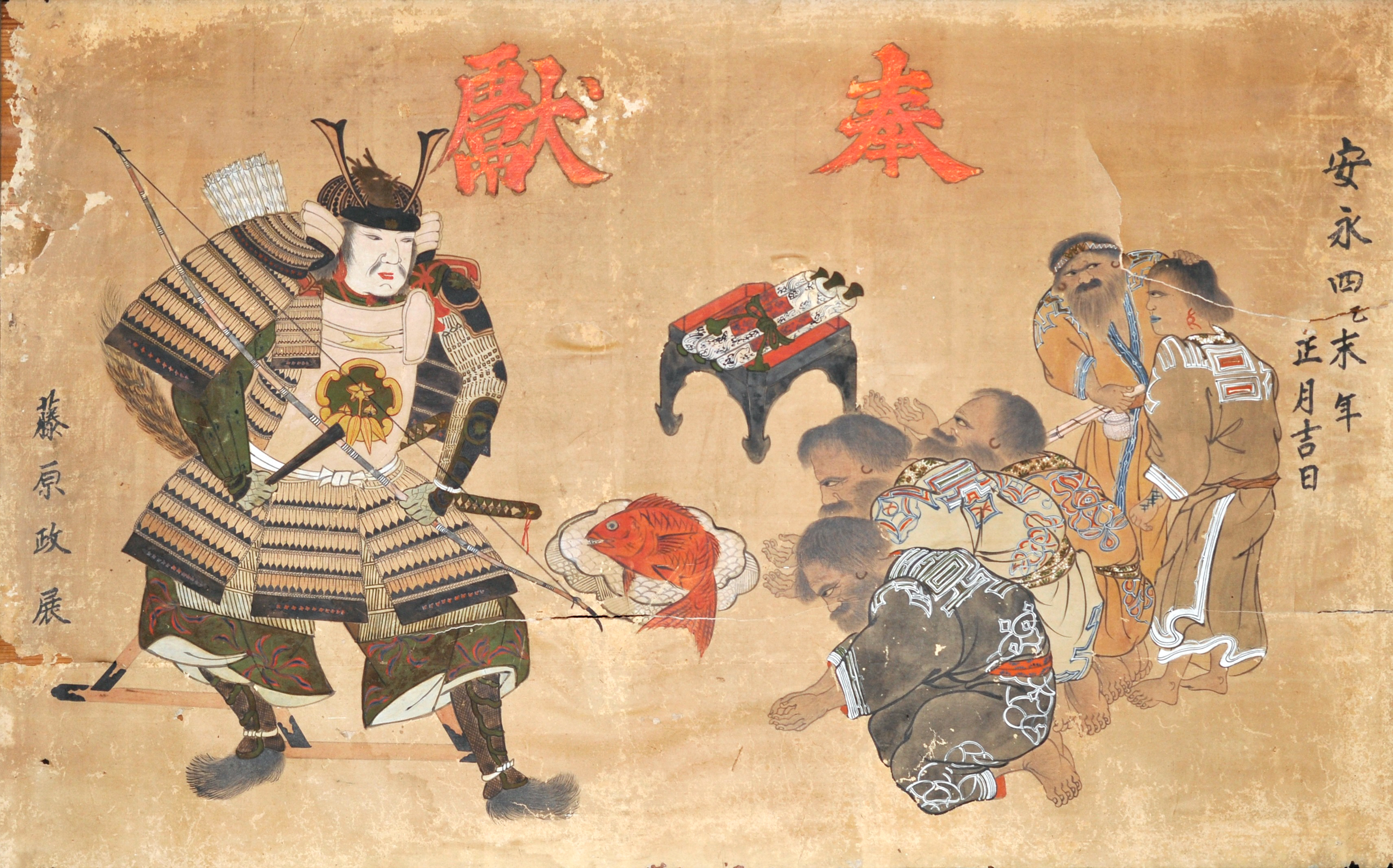
A Japanese samurai with a group of Ainu, c. 1775

In the 1780s, the influence of the Japanese Tokugawa shogunate on the Ainu of southern Sakhalin increased significantly, and by the beginning of the 19th century, the Japanese economic zone extended midway up the east coast, to Taraika. With the exception of the Nayoro Ainu located on the west coast in close proximity to China, most Ainu stopped paying tribute to the Qing. The Matsumae clan was nominally in charge of Sakhalin, but they neither protected nor governed the Ainu there. Instead they extorted the Ainu for Chinese silk, which they sold in Honshū as a special product of the Matsumae domain. To obtain Chinese silk, the Ainu fell into debt, owing much fur to the Santan, a historical grouping composed mostly of the Ulchi, Nanai, and Oroch peoples of the Amur river, who conducted trade along the Amur river and between the coast and the islands of Sakhalin and Ezo. The Ainu also sold the silk uniforms (mangpao, bufu, and chaofu) given to them by the Qing, which made up the majority of what the Yamato Japanese knew as nishiki and jittoku. As dynastic uniforms, the silk was of considerably higher quality than that traded from the Chinese at Nagasaki, and enhanced Matsumae prestige as exotic items. Eventually the Tokugawa government, realising that they could not depend on the Matsumae, took control of Sakhalin in 1807.

Mogami's interest in the Sakhalin trade intensified when he learned that Yaenkoroaino, the above-mentioned elder from Nayoro, possessed a memorandum written in Manchurian, which stated that the Ainu elder was an official of the Qing state. Later surveys on Sakhalin by shogunal officials such as Takahashi Jidayú and Nakamura Koichiró only confirmed earlier observations: Sakhalin and Sóya Ainu traded foreign goods at trading posts, and because of the pressure to meet quotas, they fell into debt. These goods, the officials confirmed, originated at Qing posts, where continental traders acquired them during tributary ceremonies. The information contained in these types of reports turned out to be a serious blow to the future of Matsumae's trade monopoly in Ezo.

— Brett L. Walker

In 1789 a further Ainu rebellion occurred on the Shiretoko Peninsula in northeastern Hokkaido due to labour exploitation of the Ainu working in fisheries. Writing in the same year, Honda Toshiaki, a Yamato political economist, recorded how in the Edo period the Ainu were prohibited from speaking the Japanese language, and called for the full colonisation of Hokkaido.

From 1799 to 1806, the shogunate engaged in a process of consolidation where they took direct control of southern Hokkaido, believing that the Matsumae were unable to resist Russian expansion in the far east. The shogunate chose to move the seat of the government in Ezochi from Matsumae to Hakodate in 1802. Japan proclaimed sovereignty over Sakhalin in 1807, and in 1809 Mamiya Rinzō claimed that it was in fact an island and not attached to the Asian mainland. From 1801, the shogunate began taking registries of the Ainu in Hokkaido, eventually compiling extensive records of families, employment histories and relations, and their level of conformity to Yamato social standards. As part of this consolidation, the shogunate also eased restrictions on Yamato Japanese moving to Hokkaido, and during this period, Ainu women were often separated from their husbands and either subjected to rape or forcibly married to Yamato Japanese men. For those who were married, if they resisted their husbands were sometimes killed. Meanwhile, Ainu men were deported to merchant subcontractors for five- and ten-year terms of service. Policies of family separation and assimilation, combined with the impact of introduced diseases such as smallpox and venereal diseases, caused the Ainu population to drop significantly in the early 19th century. In the 18th century, there were 80,000 Ainu, but by 1868, there were only about 15,000 Ainu in Hokkaido, 2,000 in Sakhalin, and around 100 in the Kuril Islands. Also during this later phase of the Edo period, Ainu remains were taken without consent to be studied and racialised by both Yamato and English researchers.

Despite their growing influence in the area in the early 19th century as a result of these policies, the Tokugawa shogunate was unable to gain a monopoly on Ainu trade with those on the Asian mainland, even by the year 1853. Santan traders, commonly interacted with the Ainu people independent of the Japanese government, especially in the northern part of Hokkaido. In addition to their trading ventures, Santan traders sometimes kidnapped or purchased Ainu women from Rishiri Island to become their wives. This further escalated Japan's presence in the area, as the Tokugawa shogunate believed a monopoly on the Santan trade would better protect the Ainu people from Santan traders.

== Meiji period ==
The Goryōkaku fort in Hakodate, completed 1866, was the headquarters of the Tokugawa loyalist army.

Shortly after the Boshin War in 1868, a group of Tokugawa loyalists led by Enomoto Takeaki temporarily occupied the island (the polity is commonly but mistakenly known as the Republic of Ezo), but the rebellion was defeated at the end of the Battle of Hakodate in June 1869. Through colonial practices, Ezochi was annexed into Japanese territory, and officially in 1872.

=== Development commission ===
In 1869 the Development Commission (開拓使, Kaitakushi) was established by the Meiji government, with the goal of encouraging Yamato Japanese settlers to Hokkaido. Mainland Japanese settlers began migrating to Hokkaido, leading to Japan's colonisation of the island. Motivated by capitalist and industrial goals, the Meiji government forcefully appropriated fertile land and mineral-rich regions throughout Hokkaido, without consideration for their historical Ainu inhabitancy. The Meiji government implemented land seizures and enacted land ownership laws that favoured Yamato Japanese settlers, effectively stripping Ainu people of their customary land rights and traditional means of subsistence.

After 1869, the Japanese name for the island was changed from Ezo to Hokkaido, which can be translated to "northern sea route", and regional subdivisions were established, including the provinces of Oshima, Shiribeshi, Iburi, Ishikari, Teshio, Kitami, Hidaka, Tokachi, Kushiro, Nemuro and Chishima. With professor of Japanese studies Philip Seaton writing how this is viewed as the beginning of the Empire of Japan, with the tactics and lessons learned later deployed in the Japanese colonisation of Korea and Taiwan.

Japanese proponents of colonisation argued that the colonisation of Hokkaido would serve as a strategic move to enhance Japan's standing and influence on the global stage, particularly in negotiations with Western powers, specifically the Russian Empire. It was known as "colonisation" (拓殖, takushoku) at the time, but later by the euphemism "opening up undeveloped land" (開拓). The Meiji government invested heavily in colonising Hokkaido for several reasons. Firstly, they aimed to assert their control over the region as a buffer against potential Russian advances. Secondly, they were attracted to Hokkaido's rich natural resources, including coal, timber, fish, and fertile land. Lastly, since Western powers viewed colonial expansion as a symbol of prestige, Japan viewed the colonisation of Hokkaido as an opportunity to present itself as a modern and respected nation to Western powers. Researcher Katarina Sjöberg quotes Yūko Baba's 1980 account of the Japanese government's reasoning:

... The development of Japan's large northern island had several objectives: First, it was seen as a means to defend Japan from a rapidly developing and expansionist Russia. Second ... it offered a solution to the unemployment for the former samurai class ... Finally, development promised to yield the needed natural resources for a growing capitalist economy.

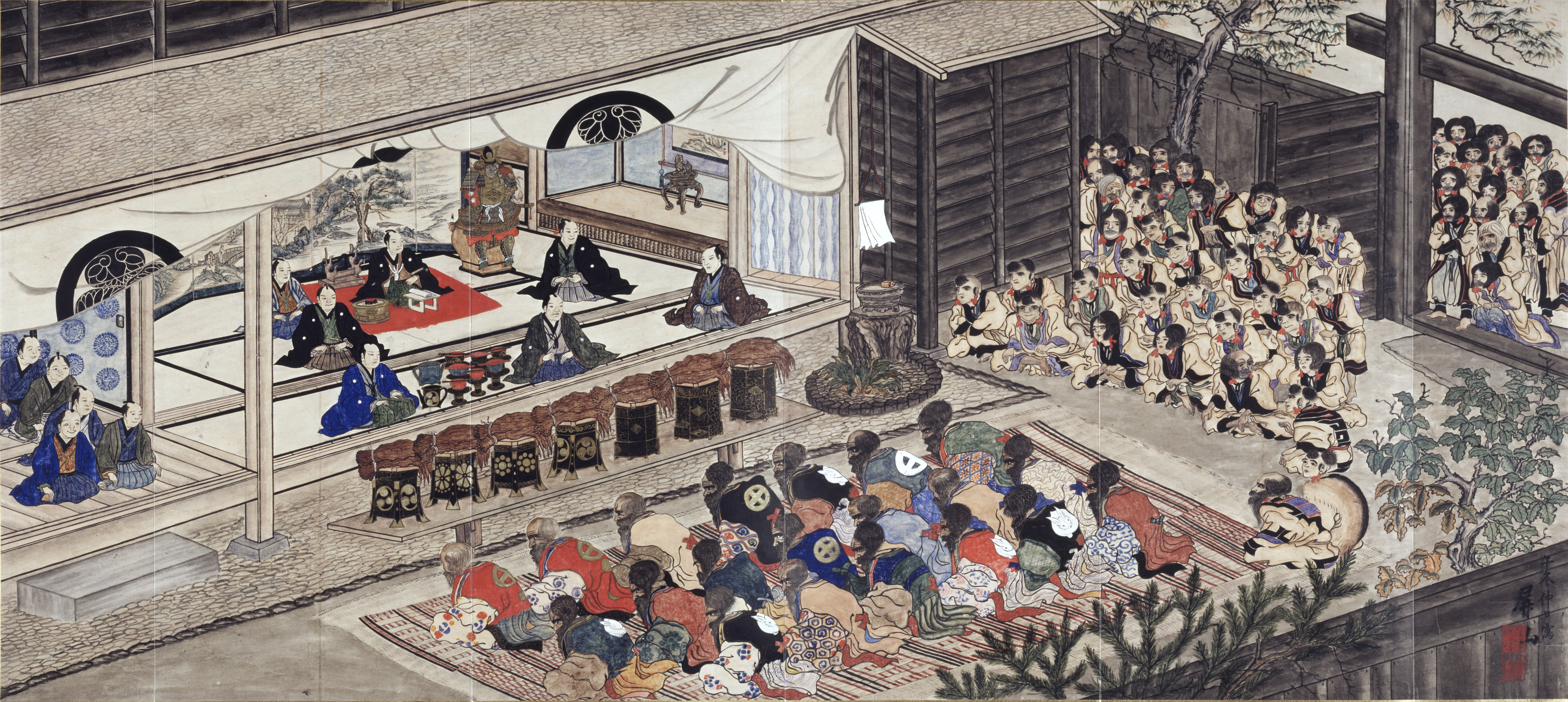
Omusha ceremony involving the Hidaka Ainu, by Hirasawa Byōzan c. 19th century

The Yamato Japanese failed to settle in the interior lowlands of the island because of Ainu resistance. The resistance was eventually destroyed, and the lowlands were under the control of the commission. The most important goal of the Yamato Japanese was to increase the farm population and to create a conducive environment for emigration and settlement. However, the Yamato Japanese did not have expertise in modern agricultural techniques, and only possessed primitive mining and lumbering methods. Thus Japan looked to American experts and technology to aid in the settler-colonisation of Hokkaido. Through the 1870s the Japanese government issued ordinances declaring all fauna and flora on Hokkaido property of the Crown, curtailing the Ainu's hunting and fishing. At the same time, overhunting by the Yamato Japanese lead to the collapse of many animal populations, with over 500,000 Yezo sika deer hunted between 1873 and 1878.

From the 1870s to the 1880s, Japanese leaders placed their efforts on settling Hokkaido by systematically migrating former samurai lords and retainers who had been affected by the political changes of the Meiji restoration, and farmers and peasants who had been negatively impacted by the land tax reform of 1873, providing them with "free" land and financial assistance. This transformation was facilitated with the expertise of American advisors who introduced various colonisation technologies, transforming Hokkaido into land suitable for Japan's capitalist aspirations.

Japanese leaders and colonial officials drew inspiration from American settler-colonialism during their diplomatic visits to the United States. This included declaring large portions of Hokkaido as ownerless land, providing a pretext for the dispossession of the Ainu people.

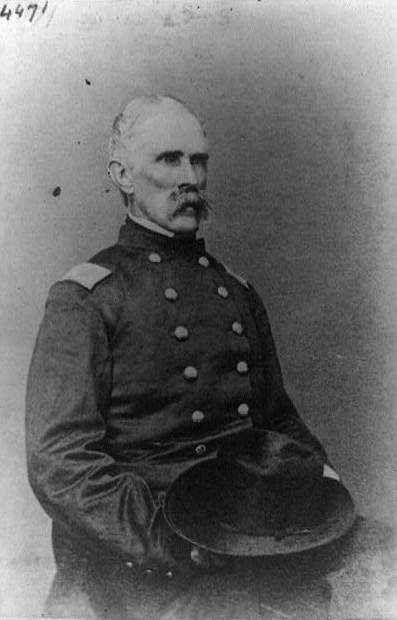
Horace Capron, c. 1861–1865, who served as a foreign advisor on agriculture in Hokkaido

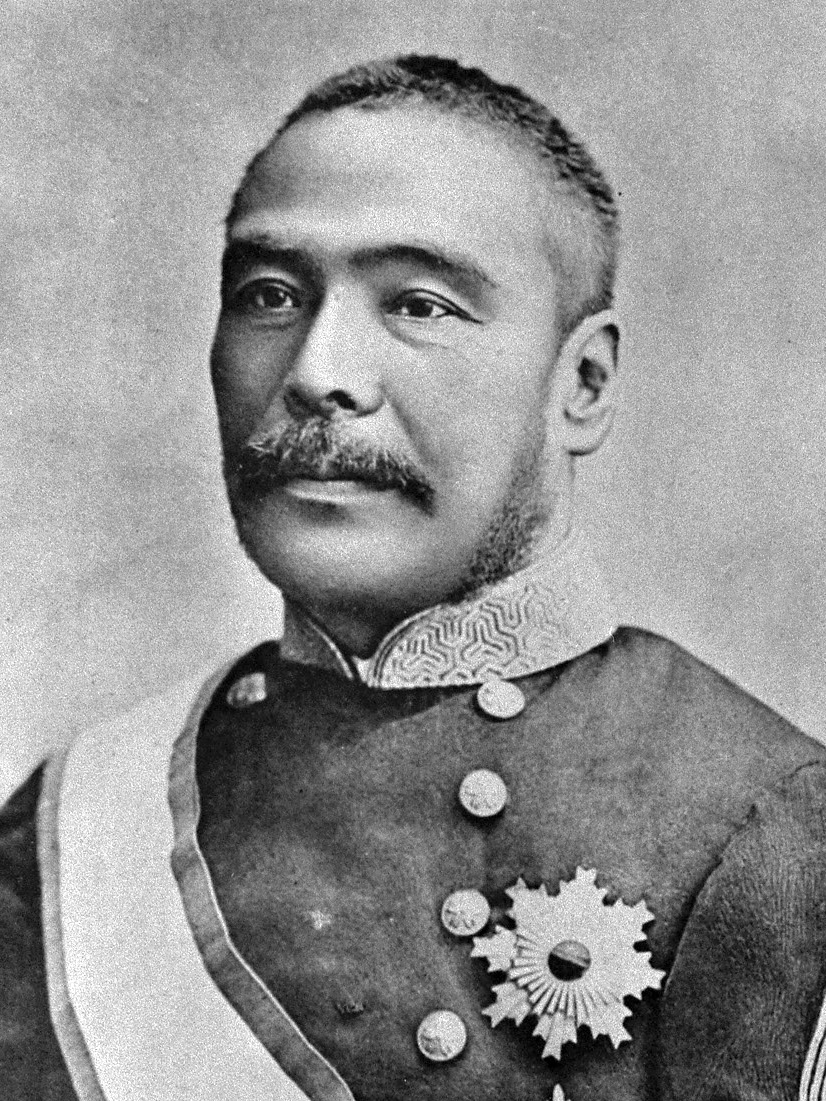
Kuroda Kiyotaka, Director of the Hokkaido Development Commission (1874–1882)

In 1870 Kuroda Kiyotaka proposed hiring experts to aid in the colonisation of Hokkaido, and in 1871 was put in charge of the project of colonisation, travelling to the United States to recruit Horace Capron, President Ulysses S. Grant's commissioner of agriculture. Capron had previous experience in managing the forced removal of multiple Native American nations from Texas after the Mexican-American war, and this was likely an important consideration in Kuroda choosing to hire him. Kuroda hired Capron for $10,000 per year and paid for all expenses related to the mission. From 1871 to 1873 he bent his efforts to expounding Western agriculture and mining, with mixed results. Capron introduced capital-intensive farming techniques by adopting American methods and tools, importing seeds for Western crops, and bringing in European livestock breeds, which included his favourite North Devon cattle. He founded experimental farms in Hokkaido, conducted surveys to assess mineral deposits and agricultural potential, and advocated for improvements in water access, mills, and roads. Frustrated with obstacles to his efforts, Capron returned home in 1875, though believed he had set Japan on the path of an agricultural revolution.

In 1874, the Hokkaido Development Commission were advised by Benjamin Smith Lyman, who had been hired by Capron and the Meiji government to survey Hokkaido for coal deposits, to place bounties on bears and wolves and encourage their hunting so they would not impede on efforts to introduce livestock to the island. To this end, Edwin Dun, a rancher from Ohio employed by the Development Commission, oversaw a mass poisoning campaign of the Hokkaido wolf. This led to the extinction of the Hokkaido wolf, and near extermination of the Ussuri brown bear in Hokkaido. In 1876, William S. Clark arrived to found an agricultural college in Sapporo. Although he only remained a year, Clark left a lasting impression on Hokkaido, having inspired the Yamato Japanese with his teachings on agriculture as well as Christianity. His parting words, "Boys, be ambitious!", can be found on public buildings in Hokkaido to this day. The population of Hokkaido increased from 58,000 to 240,000 during that decade.

Alongside such advisors, a variety of researchers and commentators from the United States and the United Kingdom also conducted research into the Ainu of Hokkaido, often using the same language seen in describing various indigenous peoples at the time. These included Mabel Loomis Todd, Arnold Henry Savage Landor, William Elliot Griffis, and Isabella Bird, with Bird labelling the Ainu as "irreclaimable savages" and Griffis portraying the Ainu as hostile and the instigator of any and all conflict with the Yamato. The same language was employed by Yamato commentators writing in English, such as politician Nitobe Inazō, who described Hokkaido as the "abode of a barbarian folk".

After the Meiji colonisation of Hokkaido, Meiji Japan depended on prison labour to accelerate the colonisation process. The Japanese built three prisons and rendered Hokkaido a prison island, where political prisoners were incarcerated and used as prison labour. During the opening ceremony of the first prison, the Ainu name "Shibetsuputo" was replaced with the Japanese name "Tsukigata", as an attempt to "Japanise" Hokkaido's geography. The second prison opened near the Hokutan Horonai coal mine, where Ainu people were forced to work. Cheap prison labour played an important role in coal and sulphur mining, as well as road construction in Hokkaido. Eventually, several types of indentured labour, Korean labour, child labour and women labour replaced the convict labour in Hokkaido. Working conditions were difficult and dangerous. Japan's transition to capitalism depended heavily on the growth of the coal mining sector in Hokkaido, with its importance increasing throughout World War I, and the mines requiring larger and larger amounts of labourers.

==== Kuril Islands and Sakhalin ====
As a result of the 1875 Treaty of Saint Petersburg, Japanese-administered Sakhalin was given to Russia, while the Kuril Islands—along with their Ainu inhabitants—came under Japanese administration. While the treaty recognised the indigenous peoples of Sakhalin and the Kuril Islands as permanent residents, it explicitly denied them any rights as citizens between the two imperial powers. The Japanese authorities did not trust the Ainu of the formerly Russian controlled Kuril Islands to be loyal to Japan, and so forcefully displaced them from the islands to Hokkaido where they were expected to work as farmers for Yamato Japanese landlords.

During the transfer of Sakhalin, Japan forcefully relocated over 800 Sakhalin Ainu to Hokkaido, with many subsequently dying due to the spread of disease in the overcrowded settlements that they were forced in to.

=== Assimilation ===
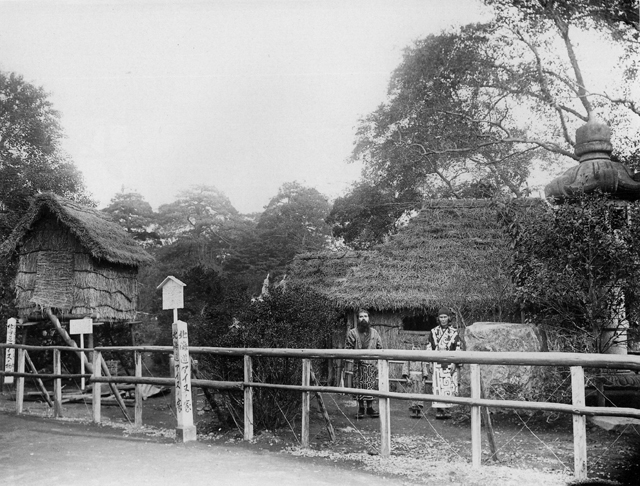
Hokkaido Ainu dwellings and Ainu individuals exhibited at the Takushoku (Colonisation) Exposition held in Tokyo in 1912.

The Meiji government embarked on assimilation campaigns aimed not only at assimilating the Ainu but also eradicating their language and culture entirely. They went from being a relatively isolated group of people to having their land, language, religion, and customs lost and eroded. They were also forced to take on Japanese names.

In 1871, Japan passed the Family Registration Law, which first referred to the Ainu as "former aborigines" and classed such Ainu as commoners within Japan's social hierarchy. In 1899, the Hokkaido Former Aborigines Protection Act was passed, with politicians in the National Diet arguing that the Ainu were in their contemporaneous poor state due to the natural outcomes of social Darwinism, and that the act would help alleviate the condition of and "protect" the Ainu by forcing them into mainstream Japanese society. However, the act further marginalised and impoverished the Ainu people by forcing them to leave their traditional lands and relocating them to the rugged, mountainous regions in the centre of the island. The act prohibited the Ainu from fishing and hunting, which were their main sources of subsistence. The act also impacted the education of Ainu children, where in 1899 22.5% of Ainu children attended Japanese schools, while by 1909, 89.8% of Ainu children were in Japanese schools. It was in 1901 that education of and in the Ainu language and the use of Ainu in schools was formally prohibited with the Education Code for Hokkaido Ainu. This forced enculturation was a colonial policy that led to a dramatic reduction in use of the Ainu language, and its replacement by Japanese. The ultimate goal of such policies was to cause the Ainu to cease to exist as an ethnically distinct group. The Education Code also incorporated discriminatory access to education, whereas Yamato children were obligated to complete six years of primary education, Ainu children were only obligated to complete and provided with four years of education.

A view of the Ainu as being a "backward" people in need of "civilising" provided the basis for assimilation policies, with the Ainu receiving the designation of "former aborigines". To these ends the Development Commission introduced a number of additional "reforms" seeking to destroy cultural practices of the Ainu such as tattooing. The Ainu were valued primarily as a source of inexpensive manual labour, and discriminatory assimilation policies further entrenched their sense of inferiority as well as worsened poverty and disease within Ainu communities. These policies exacerbated diasporic trends among the Ainu population, as many sought employment with the government or private enterprises, often earning meagre wages that barely sustained their families. This trend was seen especially among younger Ainu.

Facing pervasive stigma, many Ainu concealed their heritage. Given the Meiji state's full political control over the island, the subsequent subjugation of its indigenous inhabitants, aggressive economic exploitation, and ambitious permanent settlement endeavours, Hokkaido emerged as the sole successful settler colony of Japan.

During this time, the Ainu were ordered to cease religious practices such as animal sacrifice and the custom of tattooing. The same act applied to the native Ainu on Sakhalin after its annexation as Karafuto Prefecture as part of the 1905 Treaty of Portsmouth.

=== Human pavilions ===
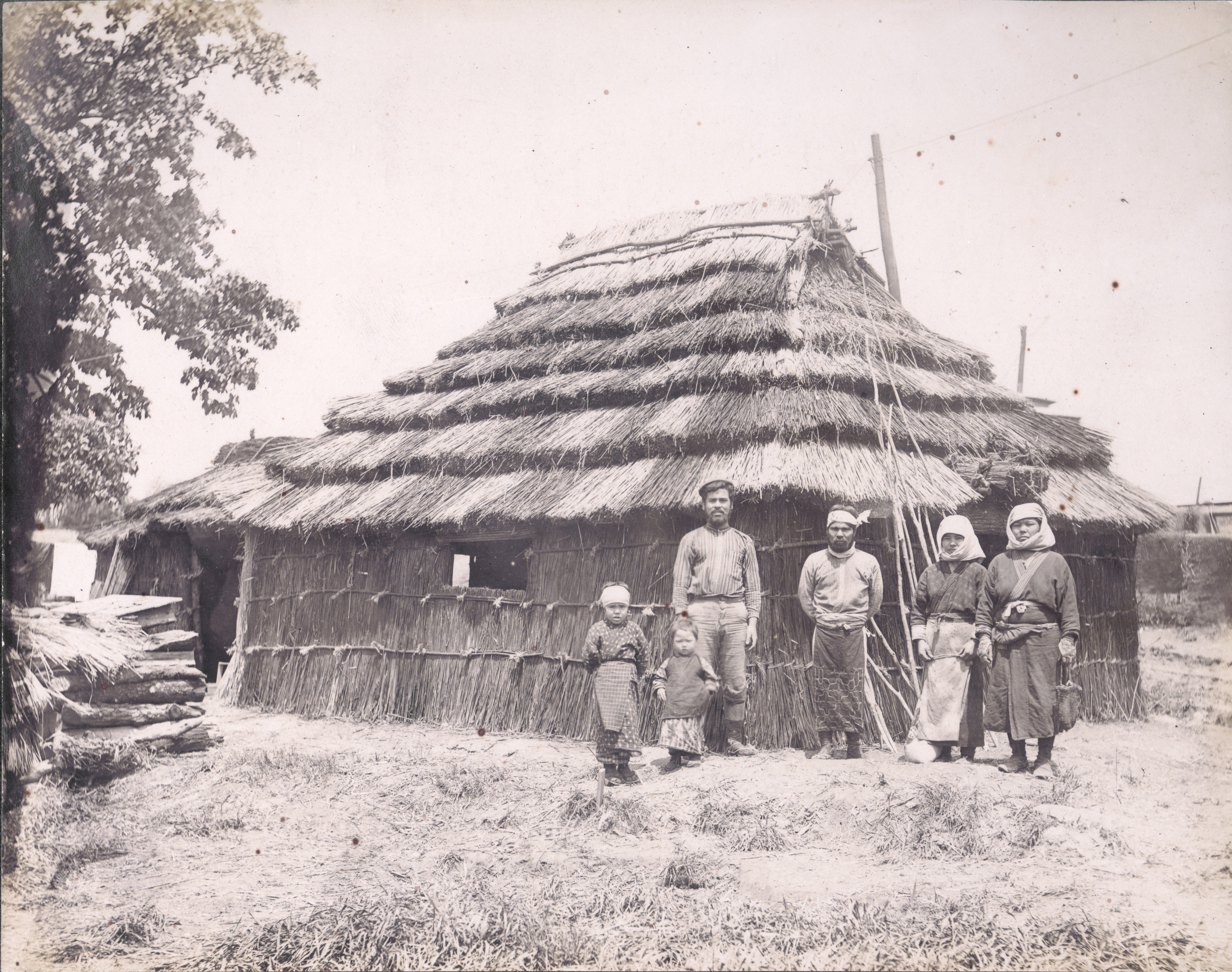
Photograph of an Ainu family exhibited at the 1904 Louisiana Purchase Exposition.

During the Meiji era, the Japanese state organised "human pavilions" that displayed living members of minority groups from across the Japanese empire, including Ainu people. The Fifth National Industrial Exhibition in 1903 contained a human pavilion organised by anthropologist Tsuboi Shogoro where Ainu were displayed alongside Ryukyuans, Koreans, Taiwanese indigenous peoples, and Han Taiwanese. At the Takushoku (Colonisation) Exposition held in Tokyo in 1912, Ainu, Taiwanese indigenous peoples, Han Taiwanese, Oroks, and Nivkh people were displayed as successfully colonised subjects. Later towards the end of the 19th century Japan displayed Ainu artefacts at world's fairs in Europe and America. For the 1904 Louisiana Purchase Exposition, anthropologist Frederick Starr recruited nine Ainu from Hokkaido to be displayed. Attendees at the Exposition were surprised by the courtesy of the Ainu, who were expected to be "savage" according to prior accounts.

== 20th–21st centuries ==
Through the 20th century even areas that had persisted in having distinct Ainu populations saw increasing migration of Yamato Japanese people. From 1900 annual Yamato Japanese migration to Hokkaido numbered around 80,000 people, with the Yamato Japanese population in Hokkaido reaching 1.5 million in 1909.

The prevalence of diseases such as tuberculosis among the Ainu, which had been exacerbated through the process of colonisation, was used as justification for policies that further dismantled Ainu communities and replaced traditional housing with Japanese-style houses. Yamato scholars researching Ainu health during this period, such as Matsuki Akitomo, blamed the Ainu themselves for the poor health outcomes observed among the Ainu, divorcing their health from Japanese government policies and colonialism. By 1939, the Ainu constituted only 0.59% of the population of Hokkaido. This drastic decline in the Ainu population, and the rapidly increasing Yamato population matches with the process that historian Patrick Wolfe described as "genocidal dispossession".

Through the wider colonial period, over 145,000 Koreans were sent to Hokkaido to act as forced labourers. Some of these forced labourers were able to escape, and often found support from Ainu communities, integrating into them and having families. Ainu professionals, students, and community representatives have played key roles since the 1990s in archaeological work to exhume and repatriate the remains of forced labourers who died in Hokkaido.

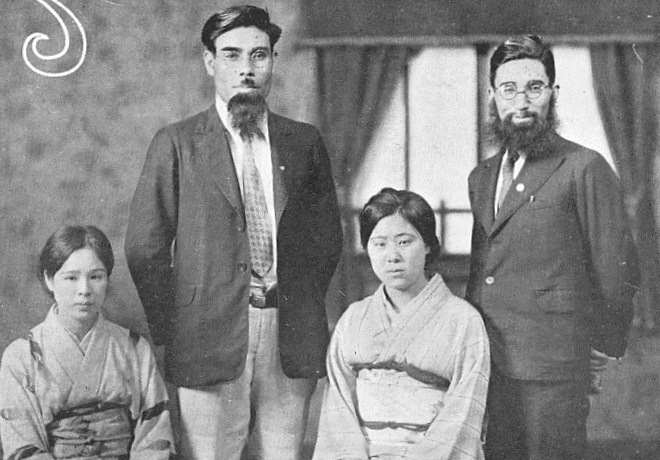
Two Ainu men and their wives in western and Japanese style clothing respectively, in the 1930s.

In 1930 the Ainu Association of Hokkaido (北海道アイヌ協会, Hokkaidō Ainu Kyōkai) was established by the prefectural government with the aim of increasing the rate of Ainu assimilation.

In 1933, the Japan Society for the Promotion of Science set up a committee under the eugenicist Nagai Hisomu to study the Ainu. The research conducted under this committee was funded by the Japanese Association of Race Hygiene, and included important figures such as psychiatrist Uchimura Yushi. The research was then used to provide scientific justifications for the supposed inferiority of the Ainu, and the implementation of new eugenics laws in Japan. In this research the Ainu and the Yamato were explicitly differentiated as different races. The psychiatrists conducting this research echoed the statements of anthropologists during this period, who discussed the Ainu as "a dying and disappearing race", as they viewed anyone who did not have "undiluted bloodlines" as not being Ainu.

The development of the state ideological Emperor system in the Taishō and Shōwa eras demanded a continuation of policies of assimilation to realise Japan as an ethnically homogenous nation. The belief of Japan as an ethnically homogenous nation continued after the defeat of Japan in World War II. Following World War II and the start of the Cold War, Hokkaido was represented as merely "northern Japan", being incorporated as a core part of Japan, as opposed to being viewed as a "frontier" prior to the Meiji period. This was also seen in the expanded deforestation to make way for farms to aid in combatting food shortages in Japan post-World War II. In spite of almost century old policies of assimilation towards the Ainu, in post-war Japan the Ainu were still viewed as inherently "primitive".

A program was introduced in the 1960s to provide financial aid to the Ainu, and while it did raise the majority of Ainu out of their pre-war levels of poverty, they did not reach parity with Yamato Japanese residents of Hokkaido.

At the 1972 joint annual meeting of the Japanese Anthropological Society and Japanese Ethnological Society, during a panel on Ainu studies, Ainu activists took to the stage to denounce the role scholars and academia had played in the "invasion" of Hokkaido and the "genocide" of the Ainu people. From the 1980s Ainu individuals and groups launched lawsuits against a variety of educational and state institutions that still held Ainu remains in their collections, these having been stolen from Ainu burial sites over the past two centuries. Through these lawsuits and negotiations, the majority of the remains have been returned and reburied since 2016, though many still remain in state collections. Through these activities the Ainu have worked with other marginalised groups in Japan, such as the Buraku Liberation League, and have been supported by members of the Japanese Communist Party, such as Seiji Ishii and Harada Ryosuke.

From the 1970s on, Ainu people and communities faced continued dispossession from lands for public works and infrastructure projects, such as Nibutani Dam.

In 1994, the first Ainu representative was elected to the National Diet, Kayano Shigeru as a Japan Socialist Party candidate. He proposed the repeal of the Hokkaido Former Aborigines Protection Act, and in May 1997 it was repealed and replaced by the Ainu Cultural Promotion Act.

Through the latter half of the 20th century, many academics and the government of Japan sought to deny any difference between the Ainu and Yamato Japanese, this has been described as an attempt to obscure the history of colonisation and conquest that the Ainu have been subjected to by international relations scholar Alexander Bukh and political scientist Helix Lo. Despite a history of political and legal discrimination, subjecting the Ainu to racial hierarchies and European style race-science, and propositions and motions in the National Diet, the Ainu were not recognised as an indigenous people until a court decision in 1997 which referred to them as indigenous people (先住民族, Senjūmin-zoku). This recognition began the process of claiming indigenous rights under national and international frameworks. In June 2008, the National Diet passed a non-binding, bipartisan resolution calling upon the government to recognise the Ainu as indigenous people. It was not until 11 years later that the Ainu were officially recognised as an indigenous people by the Japanese government in 2019.

== Negative impacts on the Ainu ==
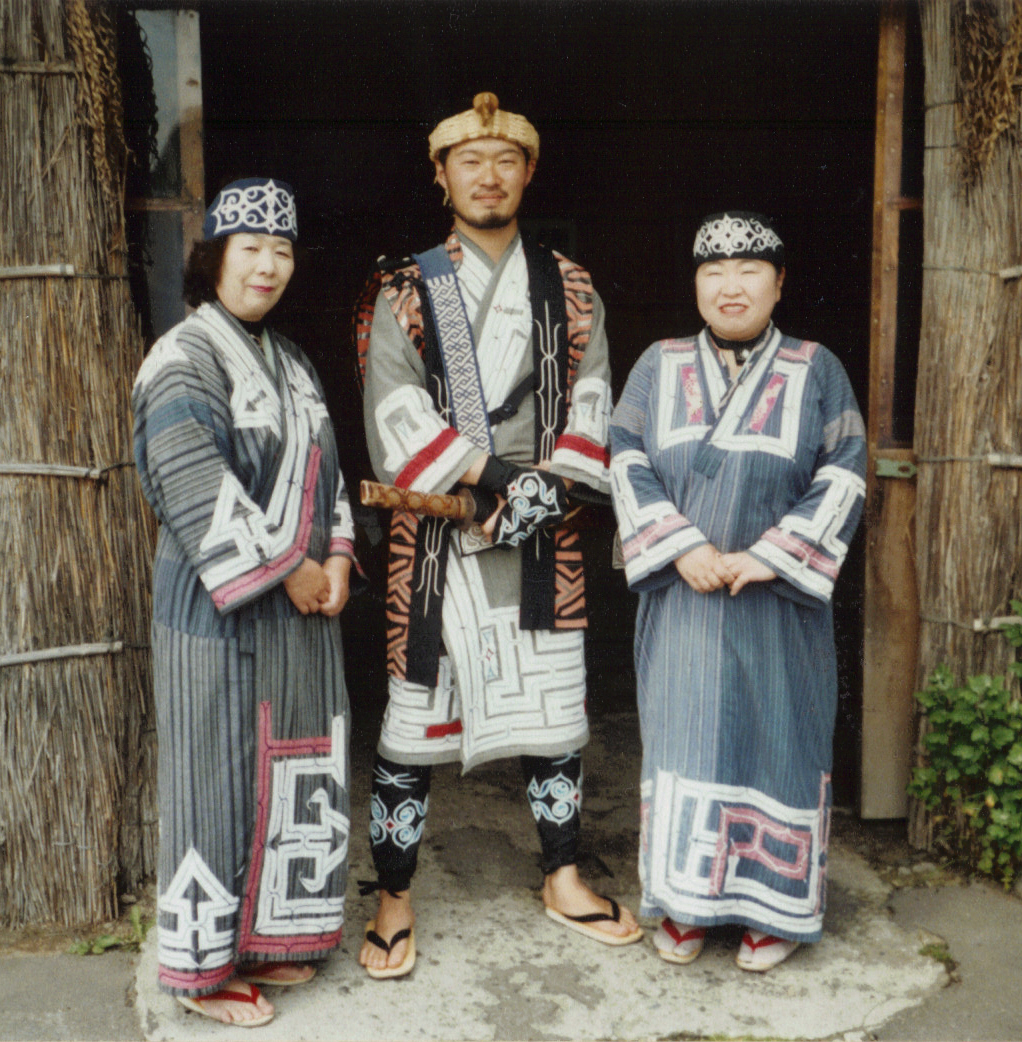
Ainu individuals at the National Ainu Museum, Shiraoi, Hokkaido

While the history of the colonisation of Hokkaido has been portrayed in a positive light in state and popular media, throughout the process of colonisation and settler-colonialism the Ainu have suffered systemically. They were subject to destitution during the Meiji period, with the Japanese state attributing this outcome to the supposed "innate inferiority" of the Ainu. In a 2009 news story, Japan Today reported that through the history of colonisation "many Ainu were forced to work, essentially as slaves, for Wajin (ethnic Japanese), resulting in the breakup of families and the introduction of smallpox, measles, cholera and tuberculosis into their communities." The Japanese government also "banned the Ainu language, took Ainu lands away, and prohibited the Ainu from engaging in salmon fishing and deer hunting." Historian Roy Thomas wrote that the "ill treatment of native peoples is common to all colonial powers, and, at its worst, leads to genocide. Japan's native people, the Ainu, have, however, been the object of a particularly cruel hoax, because the Japanese have refused to accept them officially as a separate minority people."

Ainu writing alongside scholarship have pointed out the parallels between the treatment of the Ainu by the Yamato Japanese and Japanese state, and the treatment of Native Americans and Indigenous peoples by the United States. Similarities between the treatment of the Ainu and other indigenous peoples have also been pointed out and studied, such as the Sámi of Europe and Aboriginal Australians, by researchers including Chisato Dubreuil, Richard Siddle, Ann-Elise Lewallen, Gerald Roche, Åsa Virdi Kroik, Hiroshi Maruyama, Mai Ishihara, Masato Tokutomi, and Yugo Tomonaga.

Continuing trends from the 20th century, research from the 2010s shows that Ainu on average have lower levels of educational attainment, a lower quality of life, and are in worse socioeconomic conditions than Yamato Japanese. Discrimination is a persistent issue, with surveys conducted among Ainu people in 2017 found that 30% had experienced direct discrimination for being Ainu, with more having witnessed anti-Ainu discrimination and having anxiety about potential discrimination. This discrimination ranges from employment discrimination to social discrimination. Such treatment and experiences have led to many Ainu hiding their identity so as to protect themselves, alongside internalising many of the negative views of Ainu that have been perpetuated in Japanese society. Professor of Japanese Culture Michele Mason highlights how these conditions are a result of the assimilation policies of the past and the colonial process that the Ainu were subjected to.

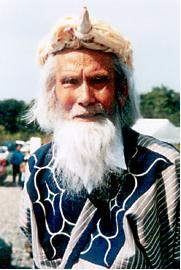
Tatsujiro Kuzuno, a prominent proponent of Ainu culture

One result of the assimilation policies has been the dying off of the Ainu language, with UNESCO recognising it as critically endangered. In 1966, there were about 300 native Ainu speakers; in 2008, there were about 100. There have been continuing efforts through the latter 20th and 21st centuries to revitalise Ainu as a language. Though the language as well as broader Ainu culture is still under threat.

In 2004, the small Ainu community in Russia wrote a letter to Vladimir Putin, urging him to recognise Japanese mistreatment of the Ainu people as a genocide, something which Putin declined to do.

Geographer Naohiro Nakamura and anthropologist Mark Watson identify Japanese governmental and administrative practices in reporting on Ainu people especially in urban settings that erased them from the statistical and demographic record as Ainu. This is shown in a response from the Statistics Bureau of Japan to a request from the Cabinet Secretariat's Ainu Policy Office to include a question on the 2015 census asking if people were Ainu. The Statistics Bureau after arguing that it would be inappropriate due to the Japanese government not having a definition for "ethnicity", additionally said that "including survey items specifically targeting the "Ainu" ethnic group could limit its usefulness and invite unnecessary criticism that it is discriminatory".

Anthropologist Ann-Elise Lewallen wrote in 2016 that the Japanese colonisation of lands inhabited by the Ainu had "genocidal consequences" for the Ainu, and that the Ainu were made indigenous through the "invasion and colonial subjugation of their ancestral lands, lifeways, and attempted genocide of their ancestors". Lewallen, alongside researchers Robert Hughes and Esther Brito Ruiz have detailed how the assimilationist policies of Japan from the 19th century has resulted in a cultural genocide of the Ainu, where their existence was only permitted if they ceased being Ainu. Historian Michael Roellinghoff described the bureaucratic mechanisms that sought to assimilate the Ainu into Japanese society and erase their distinct identity as "insidiously genocidal". In "Hokkaidō 150: settler colonialism and Indigeneity in modern Japan and beyond" historian Tristan Grunow et al. detail how the Ainu of Hokkaido were subjected to a process of settler colonialism and genocidal practices that align with the genocidal actions detailed in the United Nations Genocide Convention.
