= Ishikari (disambiguation) =

Ishikari is a city in Hokkaido, Japan.

Ishikari may also refer to:

== Places in Hokkaido, Japan ==
- Ishikari Subprefecture
- Ishikari District
- Ishikari Province, a former province
- Ishikari River
- Ishikari Bay
- Ishikari Mountains
- Mount Ishikari

== Other ==
- Ishikari (train), a train service in Hokkaido, Japan
- JDS Ishikari (DE-226), a Japanese destroyer escort
- Taichi Ishikari, a Japanese professional wrestler
