= Atsuta =

Atsuta may refer to:

== People ==
- Makoto Atsuta (熱田 眞, born 1976) Japanese football player

== Places ==
- Atsuta-ku, Nagoya one of the 16 wards of the city of Nagoya in Aichi Prefecture
- Atsuta District, Hokkaido a district located in Ishikari Subprefecture, Hokkaido
- Atsuta Station a railway station in Atsuta-ku, Nagoya
- Atsuta Jingu a Shinto shrine
- Atsuta, Hokkaido a village located in Atsuta District.
- Atsuta Jingu Nishi Station an underground metro station located in Atsuta-ku, Nagoya
- Atsuta Jingu Temma-cho Station an underground metro station located in Atsuta-ku, Nagoya

== Other uses ==
- Aichi Atsuta Japanese licensed version of the German Daimler-Benz DB 601
