= Ryōya =

- Gender: Male

Origin
- Origin: Japanese
- Meaning: Different meanings depending on the kanji used

Ryōya, Ryoya or Ryouya (written: 陵矢, 陵弥, 遼哉, 涼矢 or 諒也) is a masculine Japanese given name. Notable people with the name include:

- Ryoya Iizumi (飯泉 涼矢; born 1995), Japanese footballer
- Ryoya Ito (伊藤 遼哉; born 1998), Japanese footballer
- Ryoya Kurihara (栗原 陵矢; born 1996), Japanese baseball player
- Ryoya Ogawa (小川 諒也; born 1996), Japanese footballer
- Ryoya Ueda (上田 陵弥; born 1989), Japanese footballer
