= Ishikari Province =

Former province of Japan

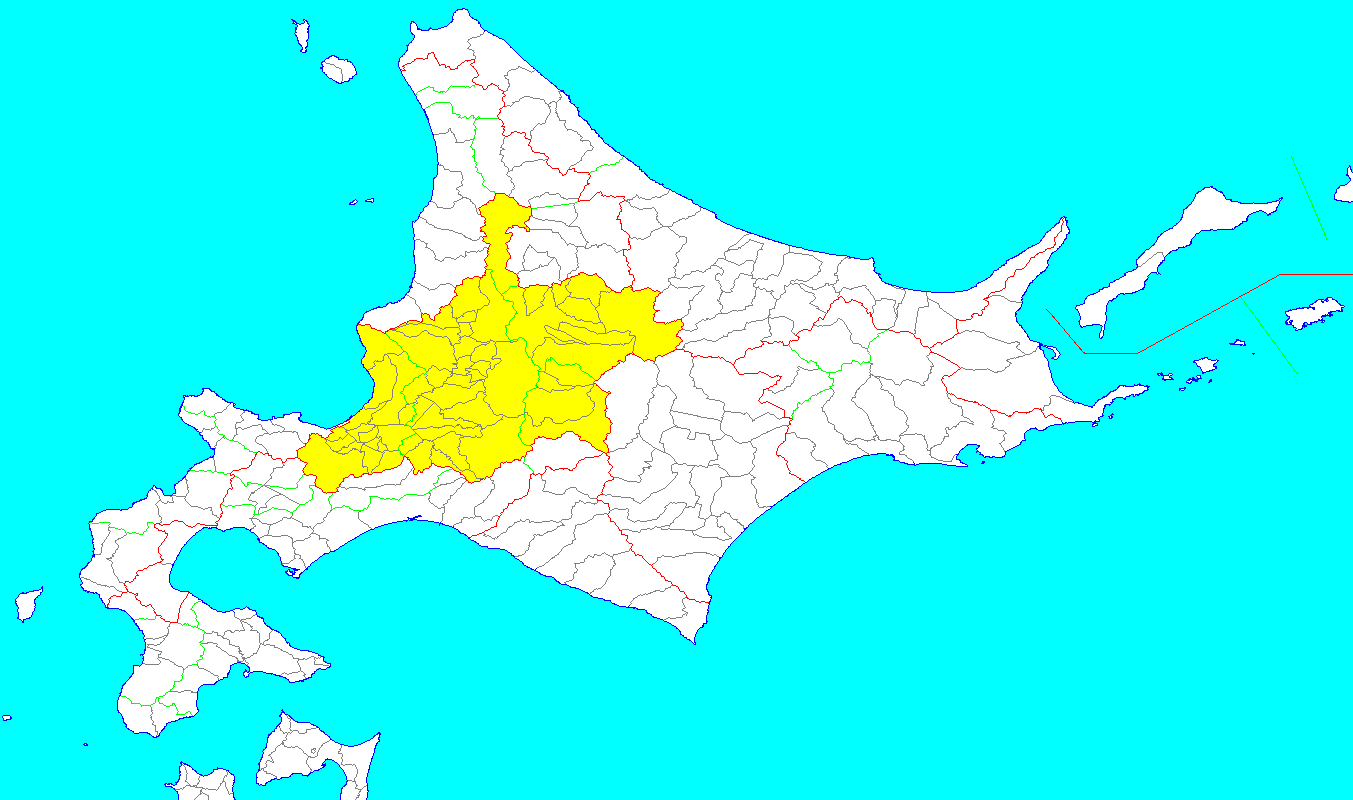
Location of Ishikari Province c. 1869.

Ishikari Province (石狩国, Ishikari no Kuni; Japanese pronunciation: [ì.ɕi̥.kä́.ɾʲí (nó̞ kɯ̈́.ɲ̟í)]) was a short-lived province located in Hokkaidō. It corresponded to modern-day Ishikari Subprefecture minus Chitose and Eniwa, all of Sorachi Subprefecture and the southern half of Kamikawa Subprefecture excluding Shimukappu

== History ==
After 1869, the northern Japanese island was known as Hokkaido; and regional administrative subdivisions were identified, including Ishikari Province.

- August 15, 1869 Ishikari province established with 9 districts
- 1872 Census finds a population of 6,003
- 1882 Provinces dissolved in Hokkaidō.

== Districts ==
- Ishikari (石狩郡)
- Sapporo (札幌郡) Dissolved September 1, 1996 when Hiroshima Town became Kitahiroshima City
- Yūbari (夕張郡)
- Kabato (樺戸郡)
- Sorachi (空知郡)
- Uryū (雨竜郡)
- Kamikawa (上川郡)
- Atsuta (厚田郡)
- Hamamasu (浜益郡)

== Other websites ==
Media related to Ishikari Province at Wikimedia Commons

- Murdoch's map of provinces, 1903
