= Hamamasu District, Hokkaido =

Former district in Hokkaido, Japan

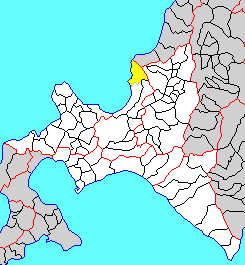
Map of Hamamasu

Hamamasu (浜益郡, Hamamasu-gun) was a district located in Ishikari Subprefecture, Hokkaido, Japan.

As of 2004, the district had an estimated population of 2,179 and a density of 7.00 persons per km^{2}. The total area was 311.16 km^{2}.

== Former towns and villages ==
- Hamamasu

== Merger ==
- On October 1, 2005, the village of Hamamasu, along with the village of Atsuta (from Atsuta District), was merged into the expanded city of Ishikari.
