= Hamamasu, Hokkaido =

Hamamasu 浜益村
- Village
- Flag Emblem

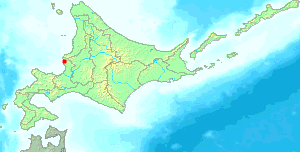
- Location of Hamamasu in Hokkaido (Tokachi Subprefecture)

- Location in Japan
- Coordinates: 43°36′N 141°23′E
- Country: Japan
- Region: Hokkaido
- Prefecture: Hokkaido (Ishikari Subprefecture)
- Now part of Ishikari: October 1, 2005

Area
  - Total: 311.16 km^{2} (120.14 sq mi)

Population (2004)
  - Total: 2,179
  - Density: 7/km^{2} (18/sq mi)
- Time zone: UTC+09:00 (JST)
- City hall address: 2-3 Oaza Hamamasu-mura, Hamamasu District, Hokkaido; 073-1497
- Website: web.archive.org/web/20050702022721/http://www.vill.hamamasu.hokkaido.jp/index2.html
- Symbols
- Bird: Common gull
- Flower: Rosa rugosa
- Tree: Cherry blossom

Hamamasu (浜益村, Hamamasu-mura) was a village located in Hamamasu District, Ishikari Subprefecture, Hokkaido, Japan.

In 2004 the village had an estimated population of 2,179 and a density of 7.00 persons per km^{2}. The total area was 311.16 km^{2}.

On October 1, 2005, Hamamasu, along with the village of Atsuta (from Atsuta District) was merged into the expanded city of Ishikari.

== Climate ==
Climate data for Hamamasu (1991−2020 normals, extremes 1977−present)
Month	Jan	Feb	Mar	Apr	May	Jun	Jul	Aug	Sep	Oct	Nov	Dec	Year
Record high °C (°F)	8.2 (46.8)	10.3 (50.5)	14.9 (58.8)	27.1 (80.8)	29.5 (85.1)	31.5 (88.7)	33.4 (92.1)	34.6 (94.3)	31.7 (89.1)	24.4 (75.9)	20.9 (69.6)	14.4 (57.9)	34.6 (94.3)
Mean daily maximum °C (°F)	−0.3 (31.5)	0.1 (32.2)	3.6 (38.5)	10.1 (50.2)	16.1 (61.0)	20.2 (68.4)	24.0 (75.2)	25.4 (77.7)	22.1 (71.8)	15.7 (60.3)	8.4 (47.1)	2.0 (35.6)	12.3 (54.1)
Daily mean °C (°F)	−3.3 (26.1)	−3.1 (26.4)	0.3 (32.5)	5.9 (42.6)	11.6 (52.9)	16.1 (61.0)	20.0 (68.0)	21.2 (70.2)	17.5 (63.5)	11.5 (52.7)	5.0 (41.0)	−0.8 (30.6)	8.5 (47.3)
Mean daily minimum °C (°F)	−7.1 (19.2)	−7.3 (18.9)	−3.7 (25.3)	1.2 (34.2)	7.0 (44.6)	12.4 (54.3)	16.7 (62.1)	17.5 (63.5)	12.9 (55.2)	6.9 (44.4)	1.4 (34.5)	−4.0 (24.8)	4.5 (40.1)
Record low °C (°F)	−20.3 (−4.5)	−21.0 (−5.8)	−19.4 (−2.9)	−8.9 (16.0)	−2.0 (28.4)	2.3 (36.1)	6.8 (44.2)	8.7 (47.7)	2.9 (37.2)	−2.2 (28.0)	−7.7 (18.1)	−21.5 (−6.7)	−21.5 (−6.7)
Average precipitation mm (inches)	92.3 (3.63)	64.3 (2.53)	54.1 (2.13)	53.1 (2.09)	73.7 (2.90)	57.7 (2.27)	123.9 (4.88)	135.5 (5.33)	144.6 (5.69)	133.1 (5.24)	137.6 (5.42)	104.2 (4.10)	1,174 (46.22)
Average rainy days	19.7	16.1	13.2	10.4	10.4	8.3	9.6	10.5	12.2	15.2	18.5	20.4	164.5
Mean monthly sunshine hours	44.6	63.3	121.3	171.7	200.3	174.9	171.8	173.1	162.3	119.9	56.5	30.2	1,491.1
Source 1: JMA
Source 2: JMA

== See also ==
- Hamamasu District, Hokkaido
