= Aborigines Protection Act =

The Aborigines Protection Act may refer to:

- Half-Caste Act 1886 (title in Victoria), or Aborigines Protection Act 1886 (title in Western Australia)
- Aborigines Protection Act 1909 (NSW)
- Hokkaido Former Aborigines Protection Act, Japanese law of 1899
