= Shōtarō Tashiro =

Japanese baseball player (born 1989)

Free Agent
- Outfielder
- Born: December 13, 1989 (age 36); Ishikari, Hokkaido, Japan
- Bats: Left Throws: Left

debut
- June 29, 2012, for the Saitama Seibu Lions

Career statistics (through 2020 season)
- Batting average: .176
- Runs batted in: 16
- Home runs: 2
- Stolen Bases: 9
- Stats at Baseball Reference

Teams
- Saitama Seibu Lions (2012–2017); Tokyo Yakult Swallows (2018–2020)

Shōtarō Tashiro (田代 将太郎, Tashiro Shōtarō; born December 13, 1989 in Ishikari, Hokkaido, Japan) is a Japanese professional baseball outfielder who is currently a free agent. He has played in Nippon Professional Baseball (NPB) for the Saitama Seibu Lions and Tokyo Yakult Swallows.

On December 2, 2020, he become free agent.
