= Atsuta, Hokkaido =

Atsuta 厚田村
- Village
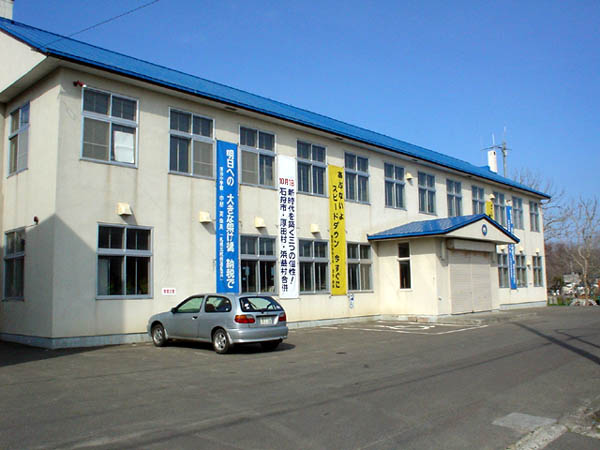
- Atsuta Village Hall

- Flag Emblem

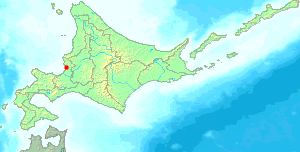
- Location of Atsuta in Hokkaido (Ishikari Subprefecture)

- Location in Japan
- Coordinates: 43°24′N 141°26′E
- Country: Japan
- Region: Hokkaido
- Prefecture: Hokkaido (Ishikari Subprefecture)
- Now part of Ishikari: October 1, 2005

Area
  - Total: 292.84 km^{2} (113.07 sq mi)

Population (2004)
  - Total: 2,592
  - Density: 8.85/km^{2} (22.9/sq mi)
- Time zone: UTC+09:00 (JST)
- City hall address: 18 Oaza, Atsuta-mura, Atsuta-gun, Hokkaido; 061-3692
- Website: web.archive.org/web/20050403160838/http://www.vill.atsuta.hokkaido.jp/
- Symbols
- Flower: Phlox subulata
- Tree: Abies sachalinensis

Atsuta (厚田村, Atsuta-mura) was a village located in Atsuta District, Ishikari Subprefecture, Hokkaido, Japan. The village was situated on the west coast of Hokkaido on Route 231 between Ishikari City and Hamamasu.

As of 2004, the village had an estimated population of 2,592 and a density of 8.85 persons per km^{2}. The total area was 292.84 km^{2}.

Fishing and farming are the main industries in this area.

On October 1, 2005, Atsuta, along with the village of Hamamasu (from Hamamasu District) was merged into the expanded city of Ishikari.

== Climate ==
Climate data for Atsuta, Hokkaido (1991−2020 normals, extremes 1977−present)
Month	Jan	Feb	Mar	Apr	May	Jun	Jul	Aug	Sep	Oct	Nov	Dec	Year
Record high °C (°F)	7.0 (44.6)	9.6 (49.3)	14.4 (57.9)	27.9 (82.2)	31.8 (89.2)	31.3 (88.3)	36.1 (97.0)	35.2 (95.4)	32.6 (90.7)	25.4 (77.7)	20.8 (69.4)	13.8 (56.8)	36.1 (97.0)
Mean daily maximum °C (°F)	−0.5 (31.1)	0.0 (32.0)	3.5 (38.3)	10.3 (50.5)	16.6 (61.9)	20.8 (69.4)	24.5 (76.1)	25.6 (78.1)	22.3 (72.1)	15.8 (60.4)	8.1 (46.6)	1.7 (35.1)	12.4 (54.3)
Daily mean °C (°F)	−3.8 (25.2)	−3.5 (25.7)	−0.1 (31.8)	5.4 (41.7)	11.2 (52.2)	15.6 (60.1)	19.6 (67.3)	20.7 (69.3)	16.9 (62.4)	10.7 (51.3)	4.3 (39.7)	−1.4 (29.5)	8.0 (46.4)
Mean daily minimum °C (°F)	−7.9 (17.8)	−8.0 (17.6)	−4.4 (24.1)	0.4 (32.7)	6.0 (42.8)	11.5 (52.7)	16.0 (60.8)	16.9 (62.4)	12.1 (53.8)	5.9 (42.6)	0.6 (33.1)	−4.8 (23.4)	3.7 (38.7)
Record low °C (°F)	−24.1 (−11.4)	−20.7 (−5.3)	−21.0 (−5.8)	−9.7 (14.5)	−2.6 (27.3)	1.5 (34.7)	5.5 (41.9)	7.6 (45.7)	2.5 (36.5)	−2.3 (27.9)	−9.3 (15.3)	−20.0 (−4.0)	−24.1 (−11.4)
Average precipitation mm (inches)	88.8 (3.50)	58.7 (2.31)	50.2 (1.98)	51.9 (2.04)	79.0 (3.11)	61.7 (2.43)	117.5 (4.63)	141.8 (5.58)	139.0 (5.47)	121.3 (4.78)	142.3 (5.60)	114.7 (4.52)	1,166.9 (45.94)
Average snowfall cm (inches)	229 (90)	178 (70)	107 (42)	9 (3.5)	0 (0)	0 (0)	0 (0)	0 (0)	0 (0)	0 (0)	46 (18)	174 (69)	728 (287)
Average rainy days	20.1	16.0	13.2	10.5	10.7	8.5	9.8	10.6	11.9	15.2	19.1	21.4	167
Average snowy days	20.3	17.6	13.5	1.3	0	0	0	0	0	0	4.5	17.9	75.1
Mean monthly sunshine hours	49.9	72.1	142.0	175.9	195.5	164.4	161.0	171.0	168.9	130.6	63.0	38.2	1,532.5
Source 1: JMA
Source 2: JMA

== See also ==
- Atsuta District, Hokkaido
