= 郡 =

郡 may refer to:

- Commandery (China)
- Districts of Japan
- Counties of North Korea
- Counties of South Korea
- Urban districts of Vietnam
