= Atsuta District, Hokkaido =

Former district in Hokkaido, Japan

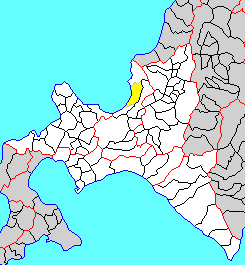
Map of Atsuta, Hokkaido

Atsuta (厚田郡, Atsuta-gun) was a district located in Ishikari Subprefecture, Hokkaido, Japan.

As of 2004, the district had an estimated population of 2,592 and a density of 8.85 persons per km^{2}. The total area was 292.84 km^{2}.

== Former towns and villages ==
- Atsuta

== Mergers ==
- On October 1, 2005, the village of Atsuta, along with the village of Hamamasu (from Hamamasu District), was merged into the expanded city of Ishikari.
