= 781 series =

Japanese train type

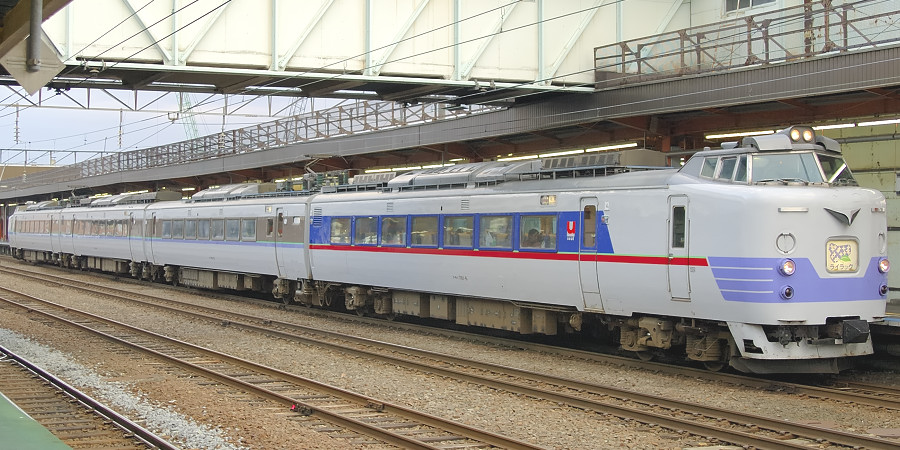
- 781 series on a Lilac service, November 2006
- In service: 1980–2007
- Replaced: 485-1000 series
- Constructed: 1978–1980
- Scrapped: 2006–2007
- Number built: 48 vehicles (12 sets)
- Number in service: None
- Number preserved: 4 vehicles
- Number scrapped: 44 vehicles
- Formation: 4/6 cars per trainset
- Fleet numbers: L1–L7, L101–L104, L901
- Operators: JNR (1980–1987); JR Hokkaido (1987–2007)
- Depot: Sapporo

Specifications
- Car body construction: Steel
- Car length: 21,250 mm (69 ft 9 in) (end cars); 20,500 mm (67 ft 3 in) (intermediate cars)
- Width: 2,949 mm (9 ft 8 in)
- Height: 3,945 mm (12 ft 11 in)
- Doors: 2 per side
- Maximum speed: 120 km/h (75 mph)
- Traction system: Thyristor drive
- Traction motors: MT54E
- Electric system: 20 kV AC (50 Hz)
- Current collection: Overhead line
- Bogies: DT38A (motored), T208A (trailer)
- Track gauge: 1,067 mm (3 ft 6 in)

The 781 series (781系) was an AC electric multiple unit (EMU) train type formerly operated by Japanese National Railways (JNR) and later Hokkaido Railway Company (JR Hokkaido) on limited express services in Hokkaido, Japan, between 1980 and 2007.

== Operations ==
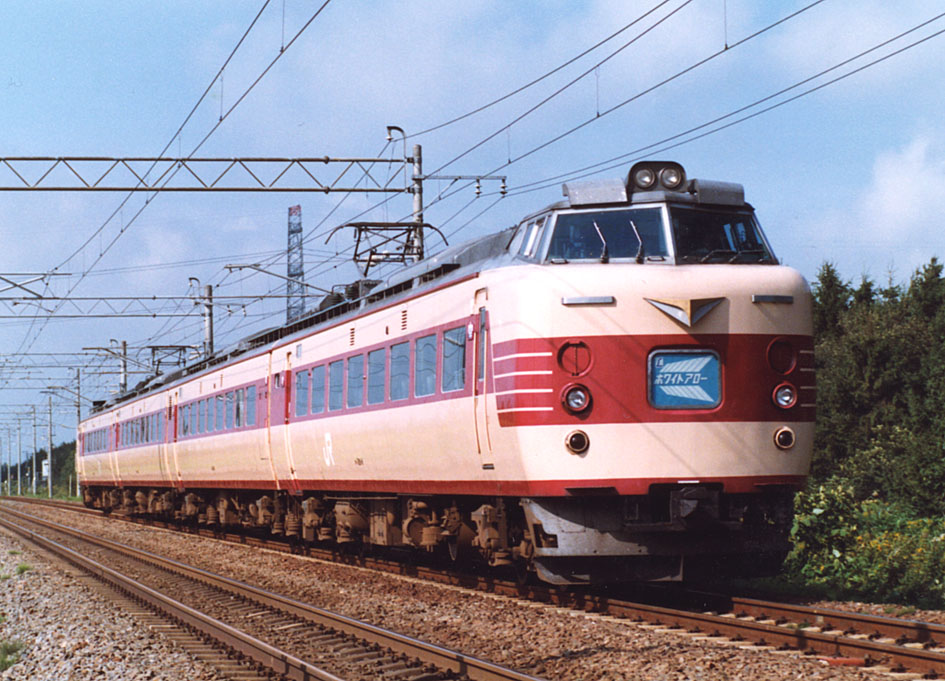
781 series 4-car set in JNR livery on a White Arrow service, 1990

- Ishikari (1980)
- Lilac (1 October 1980 – 30 September 2007)
- White Arrow (3 March 1986 – August 1990)
- Suzuran (1 July 1992 – 30 September 2007)
- Airport Rapid (1992 – 15 March 2002)

== Formations ==
=== 4-car sets (1986–2007) ===
Car No.	1	2	3	4
Designation	TAc'	M	TA	Mc
Numbering	KuHa 780	MoHa 781	SaHa 780	KuMoHa 781
Weight (t)	45.2-45.4	46.2	43.1	48.5-48.8
Capacity	60–64	68	64	56

Cars 1 and 3 were each fitted with one N-PS785 single-arm pantograph (from 2004 onward).

=== 6-car sets (1980–1986) ===
Car No.	1	2	3	4	5	6
Designation	TAc'	M	TA	M	TA	Mc
Numbering	KuHa 780	MoHa 781	SaHa 780	MoHa 781	SaHa 780	KuMoHa 781

Cars 1, 3, and 5 were each fitted with one PS102B scissors-type pantograph.

=== 6-car Doraemon Undersea Train set L7 (2003–2006) ===
Car No.	1	2	3	4	5	6
Designation	TAc'	M	TA	M	TA	Mc
Numbering	KuHa 780	MoHa 781	SaHa 780	MoHa 781	SaHa 780	KuMoHa 781
Colour	Blue	Light green	Yellow	Vermillion	Pink	Red

Cars 1, 3, and 5 were each fitted with one N-PS785 single-arm pantograph.

== Interior ==
The 781 series trainsets did not include Green class (first class) accommodation, but from March to June 2001, improved "u-Seat" seating was added to half of car 4 for reserved seat passengers. All other cars were normally designated as non-reserved seating.

== History ==
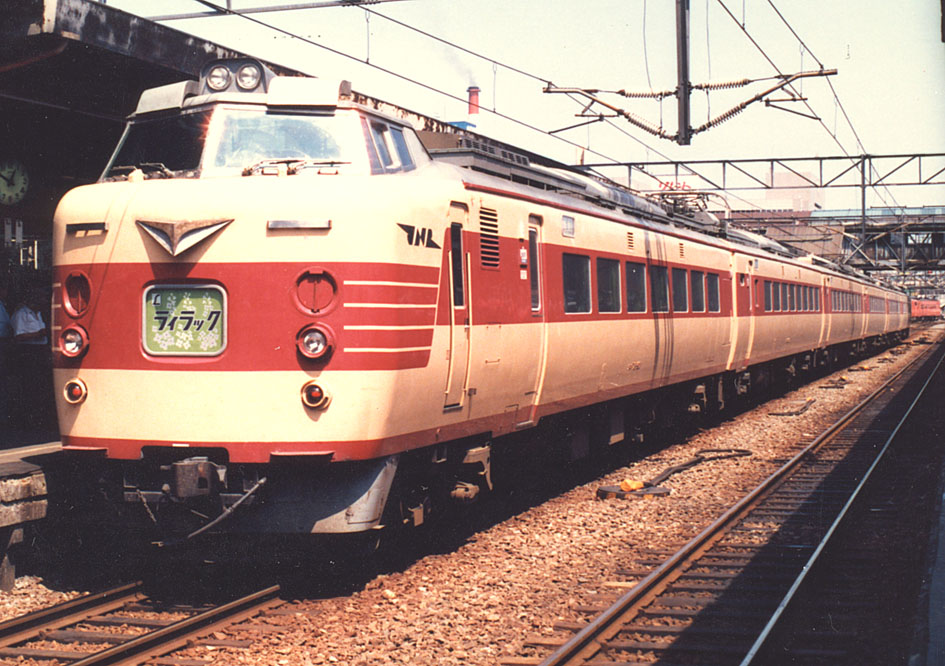
JNR 781 series 6-car set on a Lilac service, 1986

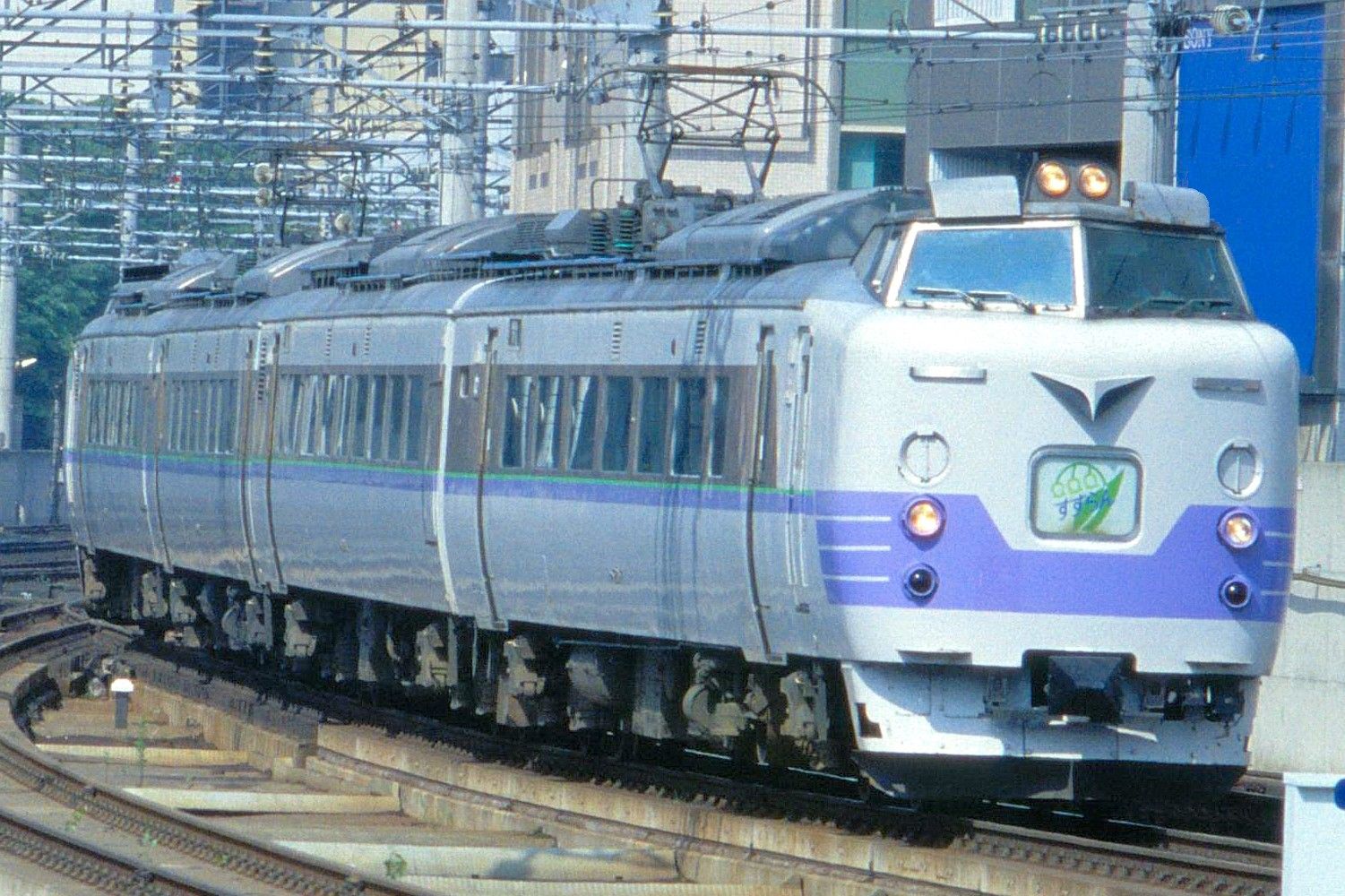
Reliveried 781 series on a Suzuran service, June 2001

The 781 series electric multiple unit was designed specifically for limited express services on electrified lines in the Sapporo area of Hokkaido, to replace the 485-1500 series EMUs first introduced on Ishikari services in 1975, but which proved unreliable in the harsh winter conditions of Hokkaido.

A pre-production 6-car set, classified 781–900 series, was delivered in November 1978. The body was based on the JNR 485 series design, with a more rounded profile to prevent snow adhering, and the electrical systems were based on the earlier 711 series suburban EMU.

Seven full-production 6-car sets were delivered from 1980, with minor improvements including the abolishment of two opening windows on each side. The pre-production set was modified to bring it in line with full production standards in October 1981.

The eight 6-car sets were reformed into twelve 4-car sets to cope with increased service frequency from the November 1986 timetable revision. This entailed converting eight MoHa 781 and SaHa 780 cars into KuMoHa 781-100 and KuHa 780-100 cars respectively by adding new cab ends.

A second side door was added to the KuHa 780 and SaHa 780 cars between 1991 and 1993 to reduce station dwell times. The MoHa 781 cars of sets L1 to L7 only were similarly treated in 1993.

Trains were repainted from the original JNR livery into a new livery based on that of the Super Tokachi between February 1992 and March 1993.

Improved "u-Seat" reserved seating accommodation (rows 1 to 7) was added to half of car 4 between March and June 2001.

In 2003, sets L7 and L104 were reallocated to Hakodate depot and reformed to become 6-car set L7 for use on special Doraemon Undersea Train services between Hakodate and Yoshioka-Kaitei inside the undersea Seikan Tunnel from 19 July 2003. Each car was painted a different colour and decorated with Doraemon characters. This operated until August 2006. The set was subsequently scrapped together with the two stored cars from former set L104.

The remainder of the fleet was withdrawn in September 2007.

== Preserved examples ==
A complete 4-car set, consisting of cars KuHa 780–2, SaHa 780–4, MoHa 780–4, and KuMoHa 781–2, were preserved, minus the bogies, at Kikyo Kindergarten in Hakodate, Hokkaido. They were removed and scheduled to be scrapped in 2025 following the reconstruction of the kindergarten. A crowd-funding campaign raised 20 million yen to restore and preserve KuMoHa 781-2 on new bogies from withdrawn 415 series trains at Poppo no Oka in Chiba Prefecture. As of March 2026, the car is ready for the relocation. KuHa 780-2's cab structure is now privately owned.
