= Teshio Province =

Former province of Japan

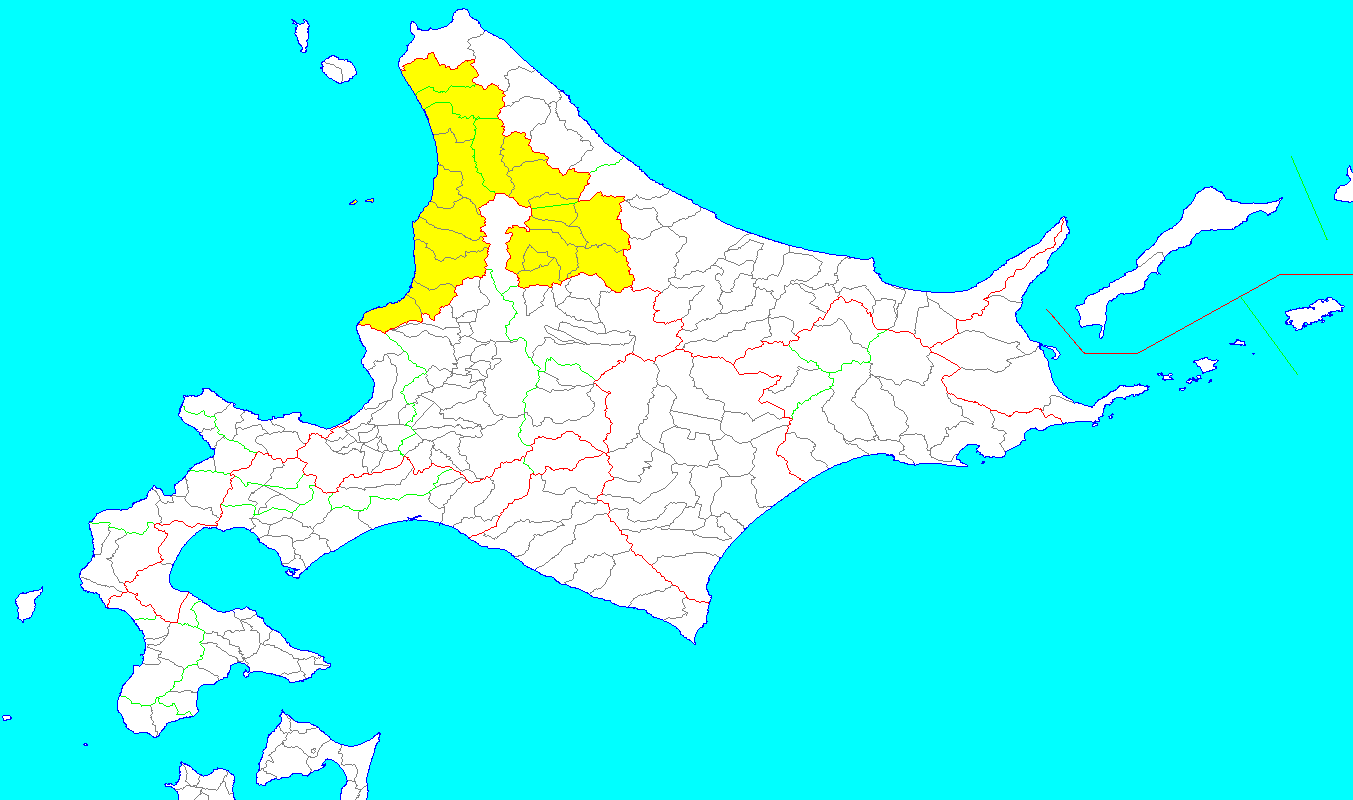
Location of Teshio Province c. 1869.

Teshio Province (天塩国, Teshio no kuni; Japanese pronunciation: [té̞.ɕì.ò̞ (nò̞ kɯ̈̀.ɲ̟ì)]) was a short-lived province located in Hokkaido, Japan, corresponding to all of modern-day Rumoi Subprefecture and the northern half of Kamikawa Subprefecture.

== History ==
After 1869, the northern Japanese island was known as Hokkaido, and regional administrative subdivisions were identified, including Teshio Province. On August 15, 1869, Teshio Province was established with six districts. The 1872 Census listed a population of 1,576. In 1882, provinces were dissolved in Hokkaido.

== Districts ==
- Mashike (増毛郡)
- Rumoi (留萌郡)
- Tomamae (苫前郡)
- Teshio (天塩郡)
- Nakagawa (中川郡)
- Kamikawa (上川郡)
