= Santan trade =

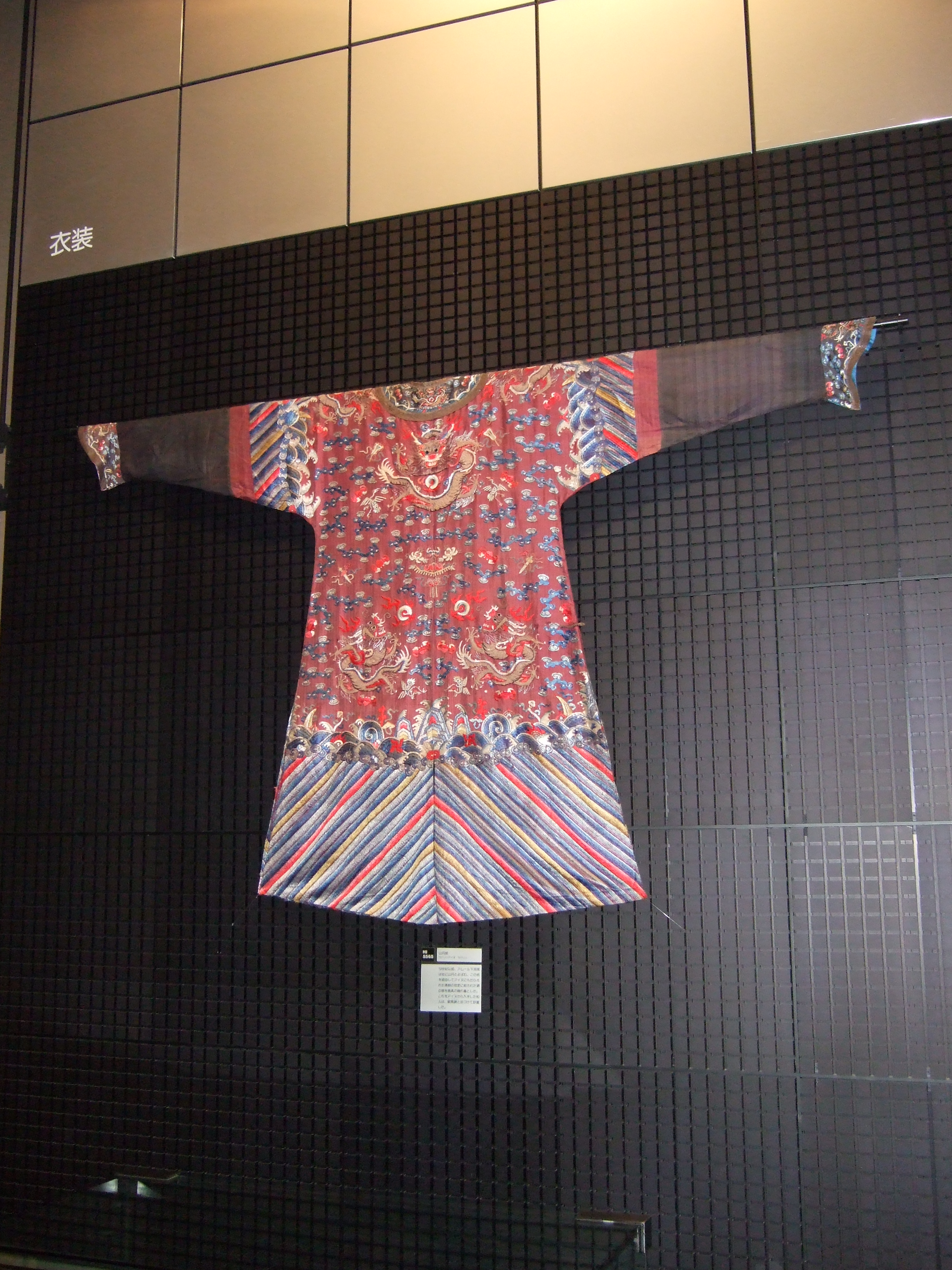
A mǎngpáo referred to as "Santan Clothing" on display at the Museum of Ethnology in Osaka, is a Qing dynasty official uniform that was sold by Santan traders to the Ainu, and subsequently sold to Japanese traders.

Santan trade refers to trade conducted among indigenous peoples along the Amur river and with the neighbouring islands of Sakhalin and Hokkaido, especially during the Edo period. The term "Santan" was also used to refer collectively to these indigenous people, being composed mostly of the Ulchi, Nanai, and Oroch peoples. The term first appeared in Japanese historical records in the 18th century and became widespread in the latter half of the 18th century. The prominence of Santan trade on Sakhalin led to the land where the Santan traders came from being called "Santan" in early Japanese records.

The Santan trade saw goods from further in the interior of Asia, such as Chinese silk, traded to the peoples on Sakhalin and Hokkaido, including the Nivkh and Ainu. The Ainu would then trade a variety of the items that they acquired from the Santan traders with the Japanese in southern Hokkaido. As part of this Santan individuals were regularly temporary residents on Sakhalin as they brought items to trade and resided on the island until they had traded all the items they brought with them. In addition to their trading ventures, Santan traders sometimes kidnapped or purchased Ainu women from Rishiri Island to become their wives.
