= Ryoya Ueda =

Japanese footballer

Ryoya Ueda 上田 陵弥
Personal information
- Full name: Ryoya Ueda
- Date of birth: May 2, 1989 (age 37)
- Place of birth: Ishikari, Hokkaido, Japan
- Height: 1.77 m (5 ft 9 1/2 in)
- Position: Defender

Team information
- Current team: Tokachi FC
- Number: 3

Youth career
- –2004: Ishikari FC
- 2005–2007: Hokkai High School

College career
| Years | Team | Apps | (Gls) |
| 2008–2011 | Chuo Gakuin University | | |

Senior career*
| Years | Team | Apps | (Gls) |
| 2012–2013 | Yokogawa Musashino | 49 | (1) |
| 2014–2015 | FC Ryukyu | 32 | (1) |
| 2016 | Tokyo Musashino City FC | 19 | (1) |
| 2017– | Tokachi FC | | |
- * Club domestic league appearances and goals as of 22 February 2017

Ryoya Ueda (上田 陵弥, Ueda Ryoya; born May 2, 1989) is a Japanese football player. He plays for Tokyo Musashino City FC.

== Career ==
Ryoya Ueda joined Yokogawa Musashino in 2012. In 2014, he moved to J3 League club FC Ryukyu.

== Club statistics ==
Updated to 22 February 2017.

| Club performance | | | League | | Cup | | Total | |
| Season | Club | League | Apps | Goals | Apps | Goals | Apps | Goals |
| Japan | | | League | | Emperor's Cup | | Total | |
|---|---|---|---|---|---|---|---|---|
| 2012 | Yokogawa Musashino | JFL | 23 | 0 | 4 | 0 | 27 | 0 |
| 2013 | Yokogawa Musashino | JFL | 26 | 1 | 0 | 0 | 26 | 1 |
| 2014 | FC Ryukyu | J3 League | 25 | 1 | 1 | 0 | 26 | 1 |
| 2015 | FC Ryukyu | J3 League | 7 | 0 | 0 | 0 | 7 | 0 |
| 2016 | Tokyo Musashino City FC | JFL | 19 | 1 | 0 | 0 | 19 | 1 |
| Total | | | 100 | 3 | 5 | 0 | 105 | 3 |
