= Ishikari (train) =

Japanese limited express train service

Overview
- Service type: Limited express
- Status: Discontinued
- Locale: Hokkaido
- First service: 18 July 1975
- Last service: 1980
- Successor: Lilac
- Former operator(s): JNR

Route
- Termini: Sapporo; Asahikawa

On-board services
- Class(es): Standard class only

Technical
- Rolling stock: 781 series EMUs
- Track gauge: 1,067 mm (3 ft 6 in)
- Electrification: 20 kV AC overhead

The Ishikari (いしかり) was a limited express train service in Japan operated by Japanese National Railways (JNR) between Sapporo and Asahikawa in Hokkaido, Japan, from 1975 to 1980.

== Rolling stock ==
Services comprised 485-1500 series EMUs, and were the first limited express trains comprising electric multiple units to operate in Hokkaido. The 485 series EMUs proved to be unsuited to the harsh weather conditions of Hokkaido, with frequent cancellations, and were later replaced by new 781 series 6-car EMUs.

== Formation ==
The typical 6-car formation (in 1980) was as shown below with car 1 at the Sapporo end.

Car No.	1	2	3	4	5	6
Numbering	KuMoHa 781	SaHa 780	MoHa 781	SaHa 780	MoHa 781	KuHa 780

== History ==
Ishikari services were introduced on 18 July 1975, and continued until the start of the 1 October 1980 timetable revision, when the services were replaced by new Lilac services.
