= Ishikari =

Ishikari 石狩市
- City
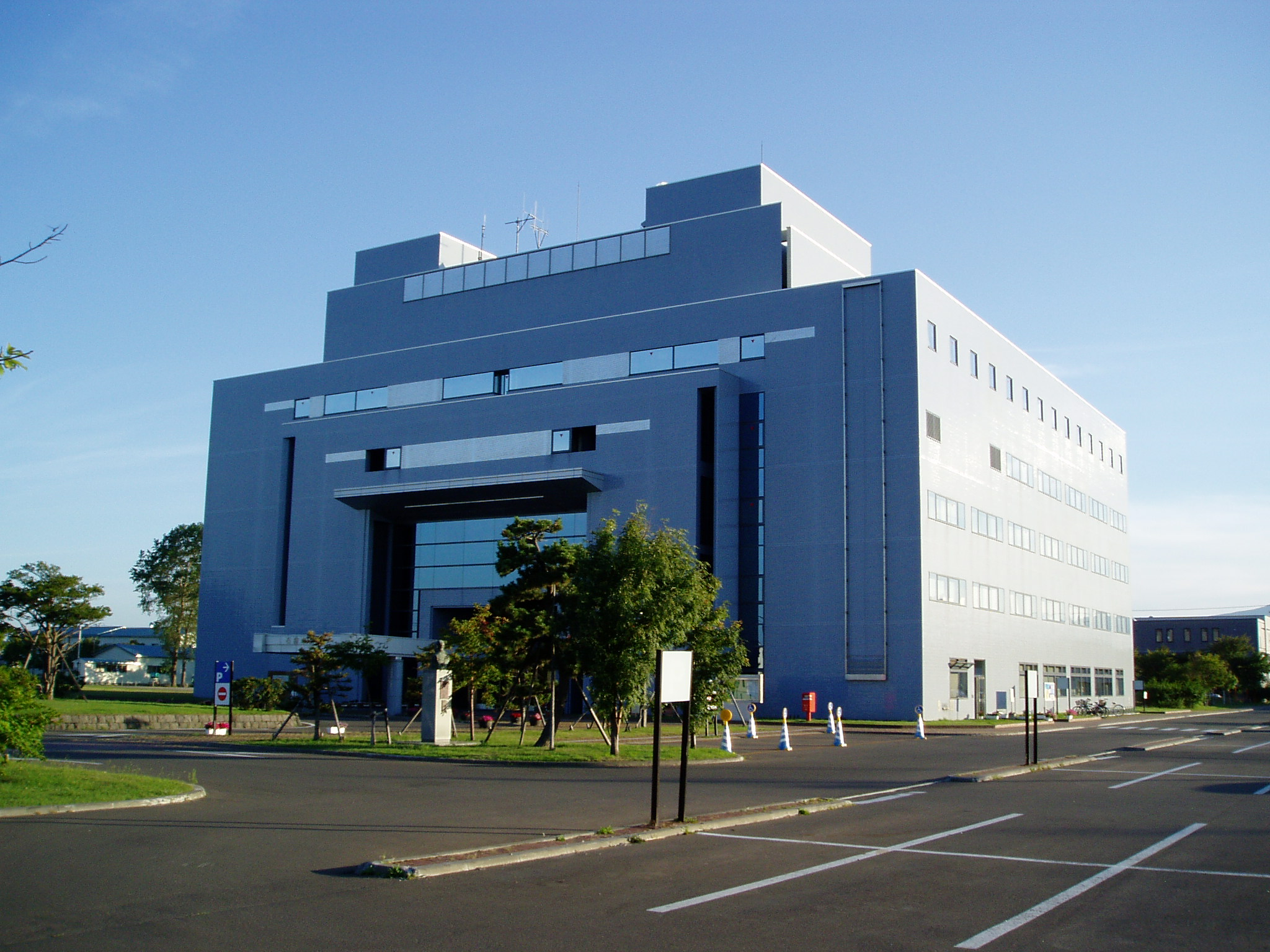
- Ishikari City Hall

- Flag Emblem

- Location of Ishikari in Hokkaido (Ishikari Subprefecture)

- Location in Japan
- Coordinates: 43°10′N 141°19′E
- Country: Japan
- Region: Hokkaido
- Prefecture: Hokkaido (Ishikari Subprefecture)

Government
  - Mayor: Katsusuke Taoka

Area
  - Total: 722.42 km^{2} (278.93 sq mi)

Population (July 31, 2023)
  - Total: 57,764
  - Density: 79.959/km^{2} (207.09/sq mi)
- Time zone: UTC+09:00 (JST)
- City hall address: 1-30-2, Hanakawa Kita Roku-jō, Ishikari-shi, Hokkaido; 061-3292
- Climate: Dfb
- Website: www.city.ishikari.hokkaido.jp
- Symbols
- Bird: Common gull
- Flower: Rugosa rose
- Tree: Daimyo oak

Ishikari (石狩市, Ishikari-shi; Japanese pronunciation: [ì.ɕi̥.kä́.ɾʲí(.ɕì)]; Ainu: Iskarun) is a city located in Ishikari Subprefecture, Hokkaido, Japan.

As of July 31, 2023, the city had an estimated population of 57,764, with 27,434 households, and a density of 80 persons per km². The total area is 722.42 km^{2} (279 sq mi).

On October 1, 2005, the village of Atsuta, from Atsuta District, and the village of Hamamasu, from Hamamasu District, merged into Ishikari.

== History ==
- 1902: Ishikari town was founded.
- 1907: Ishikari town and Hanakawa village were merged to form Ishikari town.
- 1996: Ishikari town became Ishikari city.
- 2005: Atsuta village and Hamamasu village were merged into Ishikari city.

== Climate ==
Climate data for Ishikari (elevation 5 m, 1991–2020 normals, extremes 1990–present)
Month	Jan	Feb	Mar	Apr	May	Jun	Jul	Aug	Sep	Oct	Nov	Dec	Year
Record high °C (°F)	7.6 (45.7)	11.6 (52.9)	16.3 (61.3)	29.8 (85.6)	32.6 (90.7)	32.8 (91.0)	35.4 (95.7)	35.3 (95.5)	31.2 (88.2)	26.5 (79.7)	21.8 (71.2)	15.2 (59.4)	35.4 (95.7)
Mean daily maximum °C (°F)	−1.2 (29.8)	−0.4 (31.3)	3.4 (38.1)	10.6 (51.1)	16.8 (62.2)	20.7 (69.3)	24.3 (75.7)	25.5 (77.9)	22.1 (71.8)	15.7 (60.3)	8.1 (46.6)	1.3 (34.3)	12.3 (54.1)
Daily mean °C (°F)	−4.6 (23.7)	−4.2 (24.4)	−0.3 (31.5)	5.8 (42.4)	11.4 (52.5)	15.6 (60.1)	19.6 (67.3)	20.9 (69.6)	17.2 (63.0)	10.8 (51.4)	4.2 (39.6)	−2.0 (28.4)	7.9 (46.2)
Mean daily minimum °C (°F)	−9.0 (15.8)	−8.9 (16.0)	−4.4 (24.1)	1.3 (34.3)	6.8 (44.2)	11.7 (53.1)	16.1 (61.0)	17.4 (63.3)	12.7 (54.9)	6.2 (43.2)	0.4 (32.7)	−5.7 (21.7)	3.7 (38.7)
Record low °C (°F)	−23.1 (−9.6)	−22.1 (−7.8)	−17.2 (1.0)	−10.4 (13.3)	−3.0 (26.6)	2.4 (36.3)	7.4 (45.3)	8.7 (47.7)	3.0 (37.4)	−2.0 (28.4)	−10.0 (14.0)	−19.4 (−2.9)	−23.1 (−9.6)
Average precipitation mm (inches)	89.1 (3.51)	65.2 (2.57)	46.3 (1.82)	41.0 (1.61)	59.7 (2.35)	55.2 (2.17)	94.9 (3.74)	129.4 (5.09)	123.7 (4.87)	98.6 (3.88)	99.5 (3.92)	90.1 (3.55)	993.8 (39.13)
Average snowfall cm (inches)	201 (79)	153 (60)	96 (38)	11 (4.3)	0 (0)	0 (0)	0 (0)	0 (0)	0 (0)	0 (0)	32 (13)	157 (62)	644 (254)
Average precipitation days (≥ 1.0 mm)	18.1	15.2	11.6	8.9	9.5	8.3	8.8	9.8	11.1	13.1	16.6	17.4	148.3
Mean monthly sunshine hours	66.6	81.4	145.3	178.9	194.9	169.5	163.8	173.2	167.1	142.1	87.2	65.0	1,640.2
Source: Japan Meteorological Agency (1991–2020 normals, extremes 1990–present)

Climate data for Atsuta, Ishikari (elevation 5 m, 1991–2020 normals, extremes 1977–present)
Month	Jan	Feb	Mar	Apr	May	Jun	Jul	Aug	Sep	Oct	Nov	Dec	Year
Record high °C (°F)	7.0 (44.6)	11.6 (52.9)	16.2 (61.2)	27.9 (82.2)	31.8 (89.2)	32.1 (89.8)	36.1 (97.0)	35.2 (95.4)	32.6 (90.7)	27.2 (81.0)	20.8 (69.4)	13.8 (56.8)	36.1 (97.0)
Mean daily maximum °C (°F)	−0.5 (31.1)	0.0 (32.0)	3.5 (38.3)	10.3 (50.5)	16.6 (61.9)	20.8 (69.4)	24.5 (76.1)	25.6 (78.1)	22.3 (72.1)	15.8 (60.4)	8.1 (46.6)	1.7 (35.1)	12.4 (54.3)
Daily mean °C (°F)	−3.8 (25.2)	−3.5 (25.7)	−0.1 (31.8)	5.4 (41.7)	11.2 (52.2)	15.6 (60.1)	19.6 (67.3)	20.7 (69.3)	16.9 (62.4)	10.7 (51.3)	4.3 (39.7)	−1.4 (29.5)	8.0 (46.4)
Mean daily minimum °C (°F)	−7.9 (17.8)	−8.0 (17.6)	−4.4 (24.1)	0.4 (32.7)	6.0 (42.8)	11.5 (52.7)	16.0 (60.8)	16.9 (62.4)	12.1 (53.8)	5.9 (42.6)	0.6 (33.1)	−4.8 (23.4)	3.7 (38.7)
Record low °C (°F)	−24.1 (−11.4)	−20.7 (−5.3)	−21.0 (−5.8)	−9.7 (14.5)	−2.6 (27.3)	1.5 (34.7)	5.5 (41.9)	7.6 (45.7)	2.5 (36.5)	−2.3 (27.9)	−9.3 (15.3)	−20.0 (−4.0)	−24.1 (−11.4)
Average precipitation mm (inches)	88.8 (3.50)	58.7 (2.31)	50.2 (1.98)	51.9 (2.04)	79.0 (3.11)	61.7 (2.43)	117.5 (4.63)	141.8 (5.58)	139.0 (5.47)	121.3 (4.78)	142.3 (5.60)	114.7 (4.52)	1,166.9 (45.94)
Average snowfall cm (inches)	229 (90)	178 (70)	107 (42)	9 (3.5)	0 (0)	0 (0)	0 (0)	0 (0)	0 (0)	0 (0)	46 (18)	174 (69)	728 (287)
Average precipitation days (≥ 1.0 mm)	20.1	16.0	13.2	10.5	10.7	8.5	9.8	10.6	11.9	15.2	19.1	21.4	167.0
Mean monthly sunshine hours	49.9	72.1	142.0	175.9	195.5	164.4	161.0	171.0	168.9	130.6	63.0	38.2	1,532.5
Source: Japan Meteorological Agency (1991–2020 normals, extremes 1977–present)

Climate data for Hamamasu, Ishikari (elevation 3 m, 1991–2020 normals, extremes 1977–present)
Month	Jan	Feb	Mar	Apr	May	Jun	Jul	Aug	Sep	Oct	Nov	Dec	Year
Record high °C (°F)	8.2 (46.8)	11.8 (53.2)	17.2 (63.0)	27.1 (80.8)	29.5 (85.1)	31.5 (88.7)	33.4 (92.1)	34.6 (94.3)	31.7 (89.1)	28.0 (82.4)	20.9 (69.6)	14.4 (57.9)	34.6 (94.3)
Mean daily maximum °C (°F)	−0.3 (31.5)	0.1 (32.2)	3.6 (38.5)	10.1 (50.2)	16.1 (61.0)	20.2 (68.4)	24.0 (75.2)	25.4 (77.7)	22.1 (71.8)	15.7 (60.3)	8.4 (47.1)	2.0 (35.6)	12.3 (54.1)
Daily mean °C (°F)	−3.3 (26.1)	−3.1 (26.4)	0.3 (32.5)	5.9 (42.6)	11.6 (52.9)	16.1 (61.0)	20.0 (68.0)	21.2 (70.2)	17.5 (63.5)	11.5 (52.7)	5.0 (41.0)	−0.8 (30.6)	8.5 (47.3)
Mean daily minimum °C (°F)	−7.1 (19.2)	−7.3 (18.9)	−3.7 (25.3)	1.2 (34.2)	7.0 (44.6)	12.4 (54.3)	16.7 (62.1)	17.5 (63.5)	12.9 (55.2)	6.9 (44.4)	1.4 (34.5)	−4.0 (24.8)	4.5 (40.1)
Record low °C (°F)	−20.3 (−4.5)	−21.0 (−5.8)	−19.4 (−2.9)	−8.9 (16.0)	−2.0 (28.4)	2.3 (36.1)	6.8 (44.2)	8.7 (47.7)	2.9 (37.2)	−2.2 (28.0)	−7.7 (18.1)	−21.5 (−6.7)	−21.5 (−6.7)
Average precipitation mm (inches)	92.3 (3.63)	64.3 (2.53)	54.1 (2.13)	53.1 (2.09)	73.7 (2.90)	57.7 (2.27)	123.9 (4.88)	135.5 (5.33)	144.6 (5.69)	133.1 (5.24)	137.6 (5.42)	104.2 (4.10)	1,174 (46.22)
Average precipitation days (≥ 1.0 mm)	19.7	16.1	13.2	10.4	10.4	8.3	9.6	10.5	12.2	15.2	18.5	20.4	164.5
Mean monthly sunshine hours	44.6	63.3	121.3	171.7	200.3	174.9	171.8	173.1	162.3	119.9	56.5	30.2	1,491.1
Source: Japan Meteorological Agency (1991–2020 normals, extremes 1977–present)

== Sister cities ==
=== International ===
- Campbell River, British Columbia (since 1983)
- Vanino, Russia (since 1993)
- Pengzhou, China (since 2000)

=== Domestic ===
- (Japan) Wajima, Ishikawa (since 2012)
- (Japan) Onna, Okinawa (since 2013)

== Education ==
=== University ===
- Fuji Women's University, Hanakawa campus

=== High schools ===
- Ishikari Minami High School (石狩南高校)
- Ishikari Shōyō High School (石狩翔陽高校)

It also hosts Christ for the Nations Japan bible school, an official associate of the Christ for the Nations Institute in Texas.

== Mascots ==
Saketaro and Sakeko, the city's mascots

Ishikari's mascots are Saketaro (さけ太郎) and Sakeko (さけ子). They are kappas who dressed up as salmons and loved Ishikari pot (a hotpot). They loved events that occurred in the city and all around the world (not just Japan).

- Saketaro is a blue kappa. He can communicate with sea animals and humans alike. His body contains docosahexaenoic acid (the same nutrient found in fishes) which has various health benefits. As a result, he has a "DHA" tattoo on his torso. He is first discovered in 1996.
- Sakeko is a pink kappa. Her body contains eicosapentaenoic acid (the same nutrient found in fishes) which smoothens blood. As a result, she wears a "EPA" dress. Her charm point is her luxurious ribbon that she wears on her head and long eyelashes. The year of her discovery is still unknown.

== Notable people from Ishikari, Hokkaido ==
- Kazuhiro Kokubo (born 1988), Japanese snowboarder
- Taichi (born 1980), professional wrestler (Real Name: Taichiro Maki, Nihongo: 牧 太一郎, Maki Taichiro)
- Mai (born 1984), J-Pop singer (Real Name: Mai Kudo, Nihongo: 工藤 舞, Kudō Mai)
- Kengo Ishii (born 1986), Japanese football player
- Ryoya Ueda (born 1989), Japanese football player (Tokyo Musashino City FC)
- Shōtarō Tashiro (born 1989), professional Japanese baseball player (outfielder for the Tokyo Yakult Swallows)
- Yoyoka Soma (born 2009), Japanese drummer
