= Honda Toshiaki =

Japanese political economist (1744–1821)

Honda Toshiaki (本多 利明; 1744 - January 25, 1821, born in Murakami, Niigata Prefecture) was a Japanese political economist in the late Edo period.

Born in Echigo, Toshiaki went to Edo to study astronomy, mathematics and kendo. At the age of 24, he opened his own school. He wrote A Secret Plan of Government (Keisei Hisaku; 経世秘策), in which he proposed lifting a ban on foreign trade and the colonization of Ezo, and Tales of the West (Seiiki Monogatari; 西域物語), both in 1798.

Toshiaki was a polymath who had some knowledge of the Western world, and wrote that Japan ought to mimic the policies of England, another island country, and "called for more active official promotion of national wealth and strength". In particular, he wrote about four goals for the Japan of his day:

- Production of gunpowder
- Smelting of iron and other metals
- Setting up a merchant fleet
- Settlement of Ezo in the north

== Bibliography ==
- Keene, Donald. The Japanese Discovery of Europe, 1720-1830. Stanford: Stanford University Press. ISBN 0-8047-0668-9. [revised and expanded edition of The Discovery of Europe: Honda Toshiaki and Other Discoverers, 1720-1798, London, 1952]
