= Hokkaido Former Aborigines Protection Act =

1899 Japanese law

Hokkaido Former Aborigines Protection Act 北海道旧土人保護法公布

National Diet of Japan
- Territorial extent: Empire of Japan
- Passed by: National Diet of Japan
- Passed: 1899
- Repealed: 1997

Summary
- A bill that designated the native Ainu people of Hokkaido a "former" indigenous people who would be subject to assimilation
- Status: Repealed

The Hokkaido Former Aborigines Protection Act (Japanese: 北海道旧土人保護法公布) was a Japanese law enacted by the Imperial Diet in 1899 during the reign of Emperor Meiji. The law concerned the status of the indigenous Ainu people of Hokkaido, a population the Imperial government sought to forcibly assimilate. The law was repealed in 1997 and replaced by the Ainu Cultural Promotion Act (CPA).

Created under the pretense of protecting the Ainu people, organizations such as the Ainu Association of Hokkaido argue that the law served to confiscate Ainu land and destroy their traditional culture. According to a paper published in the Georgetown Journal of Asian Affairs, "The aim of [the law] was to 'civilize' and 'Japanize' the Ainu from 'barbarians' to 'primitive Japanese'.”

== Background ==
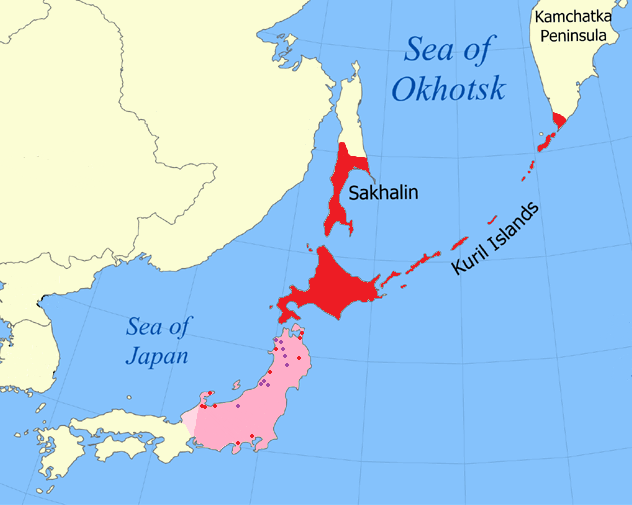
'Aynurmosir', the traditional land of the Ainu people

== Provisions and consequences ==
=== Land ownership and poverty ===
Under the pretense of alleviating Ainu poverty, the legislation created individual land grants and promoted the adoption of Japanese agricultural practices over hunting. The legislation has been criticized as a means by which the Imperial government forcibly confiscated Ainu lands and impeded traditional Ainu culture. The land allotted to Ainu farmers was generally of poorer quality than that received by Japanese settlers in Hokkaido.

=== Cultural impact ===
The law prohibited the Ainu from speaking their native language or practicing their traditional animistic religion. Through the legislation, Ainu children received "a rudimentary education in the Japanese language that focused on “national” ethics".

== Legacy ==
A 1993 survey found that the law was only mentioned in a minority of Japanese textbooks. Ainu activists consider the legislation to have helped facilitate the destruction of Ainu traditional customs to the benefit of Japanese settlers.

== See also ==
- Hokkaidō Development Commission
- Natives Land Act, 1913 (South Africa)
