= Ishikari Subprefecture =

Coordinates: 43°03′52″N 141°20′45″E

Ishikari Subprefecture 石狩振興局 Ishikarapet (Ainu)
- Ishikari-shinkō-kyoku
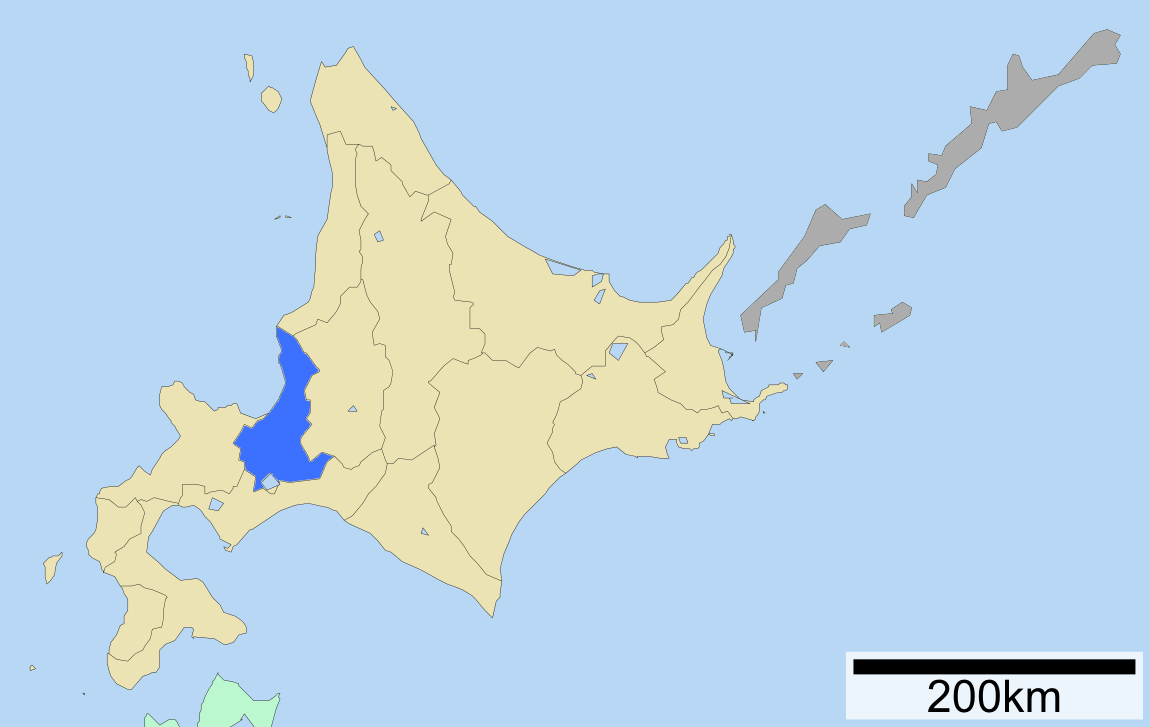
- Prefecture: Hokkaido
- Capital: Sapporo

Area
  - Total: 3,539.86 km^{2} (1,366.75 sq mi)

Population (July 31, 2023)
  - Total: 2,379,802
  - Density: 672.287/km^{2} (1,741.22/sq mi)
- Website: ishikari.pref.hokkaido.lg.jp

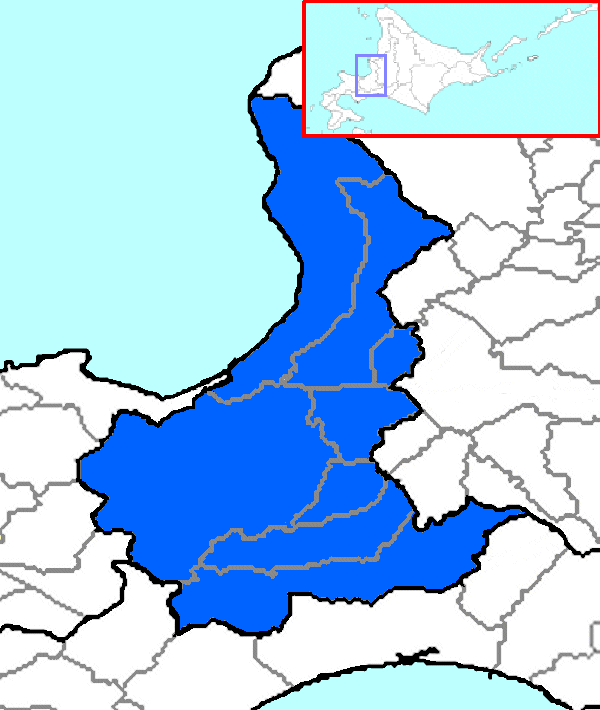
Ishikari Subprefecture

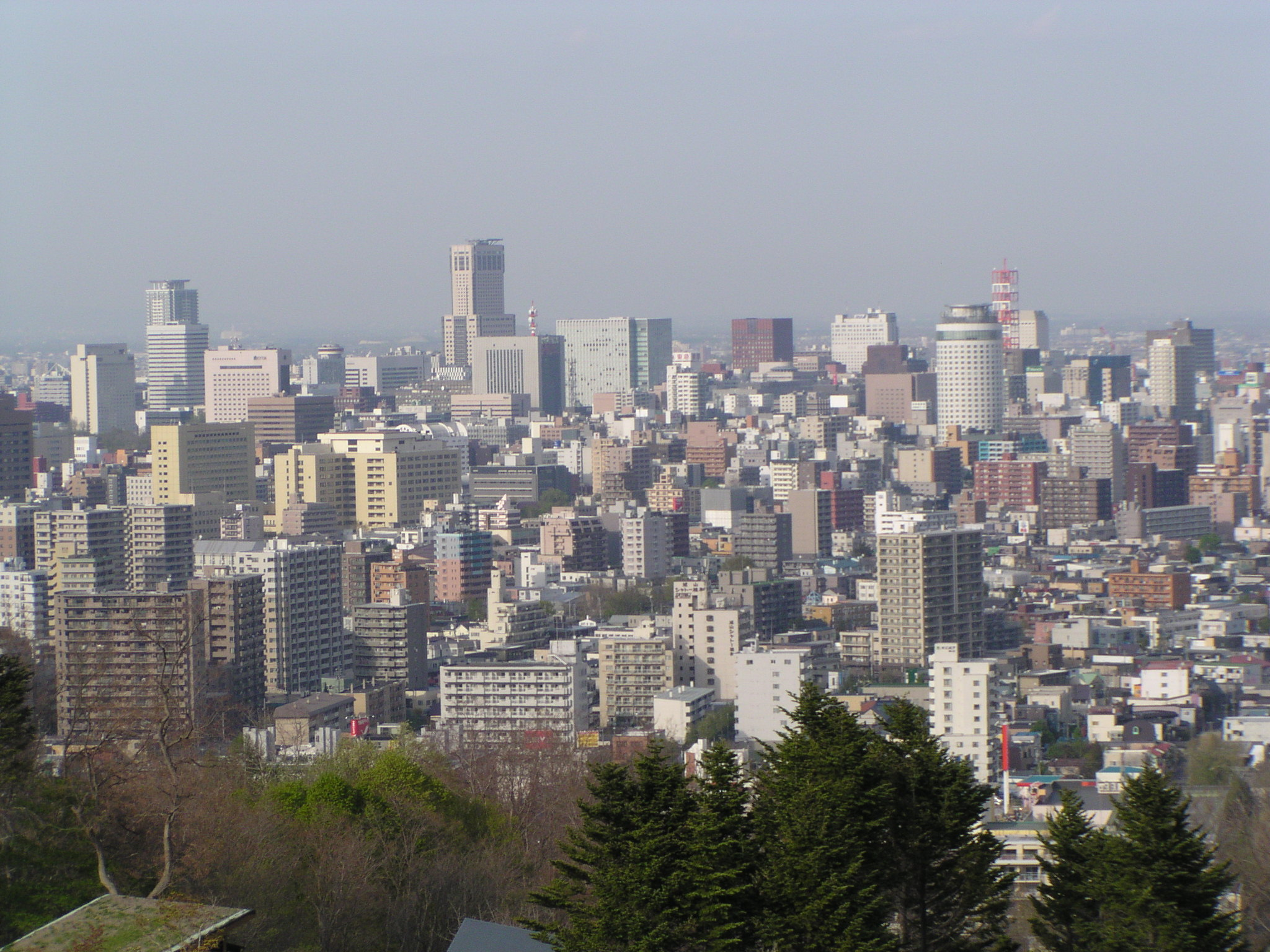
Sapporo

Ishikari Subprefecture (石狩振興局, Ishikari-shinkō-kyoku) is a subprefecture of Hokkaido Prefecture, Japan, located in the western part of the island. The subprefecture covers 3,539.86 square kilometres (1,366.75 mi^{2}) and on July 31, 2023 had a population of 2,379,802. The subprefecture takes its name from the Ishikari River, the third longest in Japan, which flows through western Hokkaido and empties into the Sea of Japan in the city of Ishikari. There are 6 cities, three towns, and one village under its jurisdiction. Sapporo is both the capital of Hokkaido Prefecture and Ishikari Subprefecture. Shikotsu-Toya National Park is located in the southern part of the subprefecture, and Shokanbetsu-Teuri-Yagishiri Quasi-National Park in the north.

== Etymology ==
The word Ishikari comes from the Ainu language, and several theories exist as to the meaning of the name.

- The most common translation of "Ishikari", proposed by the missionary and researcher of the Ainu language John Batchelor (1854 – 1944) in 1935, is "a greatly wandering river", a reference to the meandering path of the Ishikari River. According to Batchelor Ishikari is a corruption of "i-sikar-pet" or "ishikaripet". The 'i' sound of i-sikar-pet is a prefix meaning "greatly" or "exceedingly"; shikari meaning "zigzag" or "serpentine", and pet is the Ainu word for river.
- Tōgo Yoshida (1864 – 1918), proposed in the Dai Nihon Chimei Jisho, published between 1907 and 1910, that "Ishikaripet" had its origin in the Ainu language word "Ishikarapet", meaning "a beautifully formed river"; ishu meaning "beautiful", kara meaning "constructed" and pet meaning river.

"Ishikari" is written in the Japanese language using ateji, or kanji characters used to phonetically represent native or borrowed words. The first, 石, means to "stone", and the second, 狩, means "to hunt". The meaning of the written form of Ishikari has no relationship to the meaning of word in the Ainu language.

== Geography ==
=== Municipalities ===
Name		Area (km^{2})	Population	District	Type	Map
Rōmaji	Kanji	Area (km^{2})	Population	District	Type	Map
Chitose	千歳市	594.5	98,047	no district	City	
Ebetsu	江別市	187.38	118,764	no district	City	
Eniwa	恵庭市	294.65	70,278	no district	City	
Ishikari	石狩市	722.42	57,764	no district	City	
Kitahiroshima	北広島市	119.05	57,019	no district	City	
Sapporo (prefectural and subprefectural capital)	札幌市	1,121.26	1,959,750	no district	City	
Shinshinotsu	新篠津村	78.04	2,833	Ishikari District	Village	
Tōbetsu	当別町	422.86	15,347	Ishikari District	Town	

== History ==
- 1897: Sapporo Subprefecture established.
- 1922: Renamed Ishikari Subprefecture.
- 1996: Hiroshima Town becomes Kitahiroshima City, dissolving Sapporo District.

== Transportation ==
Ishikari Prefecture has two airports, both serving the greater Sapporo area.

- Okadama Airport (Domestic)
- New Chitose Airport (International) (Located in the city of Chitose)
