= Airport (train) =

Japanese rapid train service

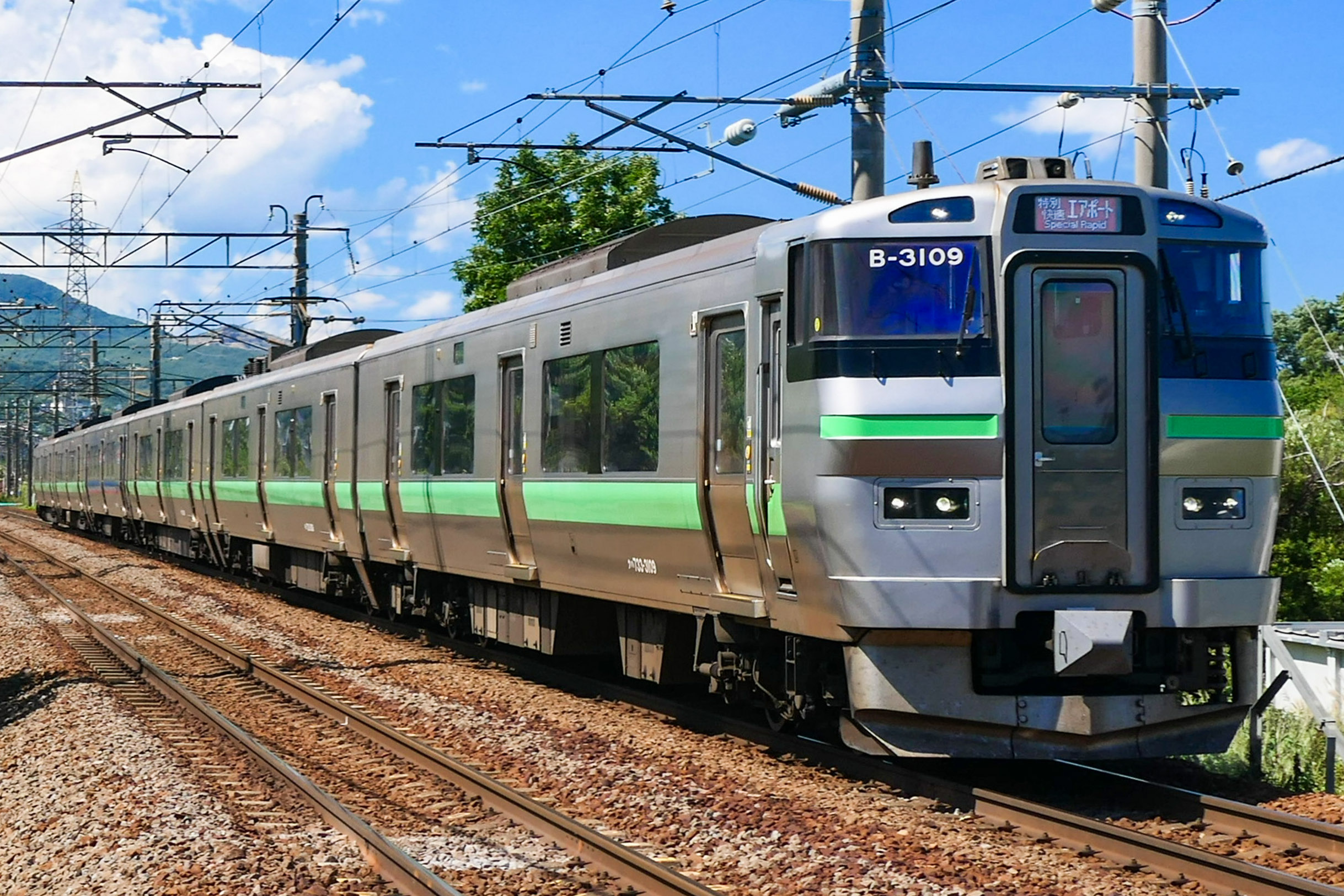
- A 733-3000 series set on a Special Rapid Airport service in August 2024

Overview
- Service type: Special Rapid; Rapid; Semi-Rapid
- Locale: Hokkaido
- First service: 1 July 1992 (Rapid); 14 March 2020 (Special Rapid); 16 March 2024 (Semi-Rapid)
- Current operator: JR Hokkaido

Route
- Termini: New Chitose Airport; Otaru/Sapporo
- Lines used: Chitose Line, Hakodate Main Line

On-board services
- Class: Standard class only

Technical
- Rolling stock: 721 series and 733 series EMUs
- Track gauge: 1,067 mm (3 ft 6 in)
- Electrification: 20 kV AC overhead
- Operating speed: 120 km/h (75 mph)

The Airport (エアポート) is a series of rapid train services operated by Hokkaido Railway Company (JR Hokkaido), which run from New Chitose Airport to Sapporo and Otaru on the Chitose Line and Hakodate Main Line.

== Operations ==
As of 16 March 2024, during daytime hours, six Airport services (one Special Rapid, three Rapid and two Semi-Rapid) operate every hour between New Chitose Airport and Sapporo. Of these, one Special Rapid service and one Rapid service per hour operate to and from Otaru.

=== Stations served ===
Airport services stop at the following stations:

Legend

●	All trains stop
▲	Some trains stop
△	Trains stop only during special events

Station		Semi-Rapid	Rapid	Special Rapid
AP15	New Chitose Airport	●	●	●
H14	Minami-Chitose	●	●	●
H13	Chitose	●	●	｜
H12	Osatsu	●	｜	｜
H11	Sapporo Beer Teien	●	｜	｜
H10	Eniwa	●	●	｜
H09	Megumino	●	｜	｜
H08	Shimamatsu	●	｜	｜
H07	Kita-Hiroshima	●	●	△
H05	Shin-Sapporo	●	●	●
H03	Shiroishi	｜	▲	｜
01	Sapporo	●	●	●
S02	Sōen		●	●
S03	Kotoni		●	●
S07	Teine		●	●
S08	Inaho		▲	｜
S09	Hoshioki		▲	｜
S10	Hoshimi		▲	｜
S11	Zenibako		▲	｜
S12	Asari		▲	｜
S13	Otaru-Chikkō		●	●
S14	Minami-Otaru		●	●
S15	Otaru		●	●

Some Special Rapid trains bound for Sapporo make an extra stop at Kita-Hiroshima Station only when there are night baseball events at Es Con Field Hokkaido.

== Rolling stock ==
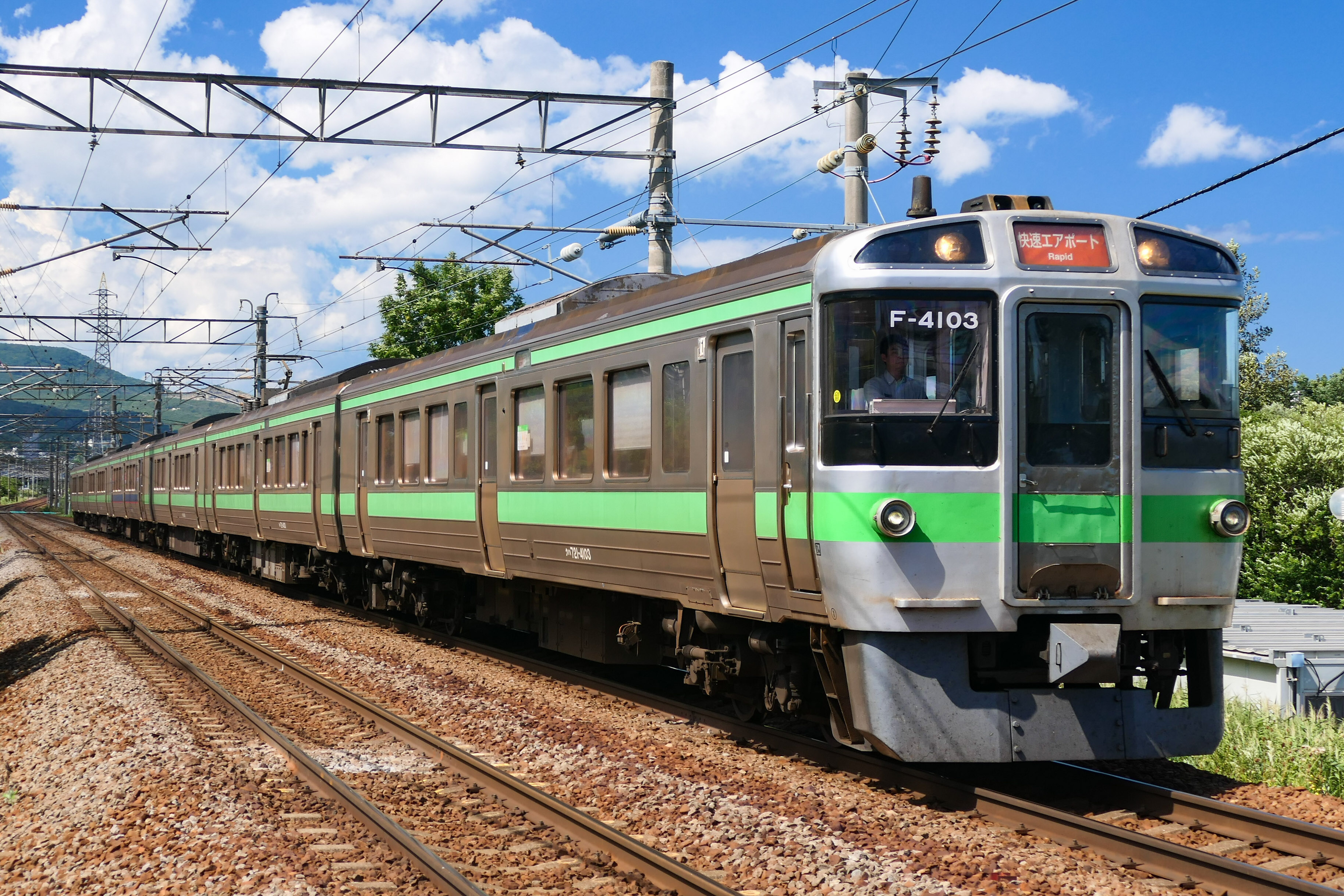
A 721 series set on a Rapid Airport service in August 2024

Services are formed of 6-car 721 series and 733 series EMUs.

Car No.	1	2	3	4	5	6
Accommodation	Non-reserved	Non-reserved	Non-reserved	Reserved (u-Seat)	Non-reserved	Non-reserved

=== Former rolling stock ===
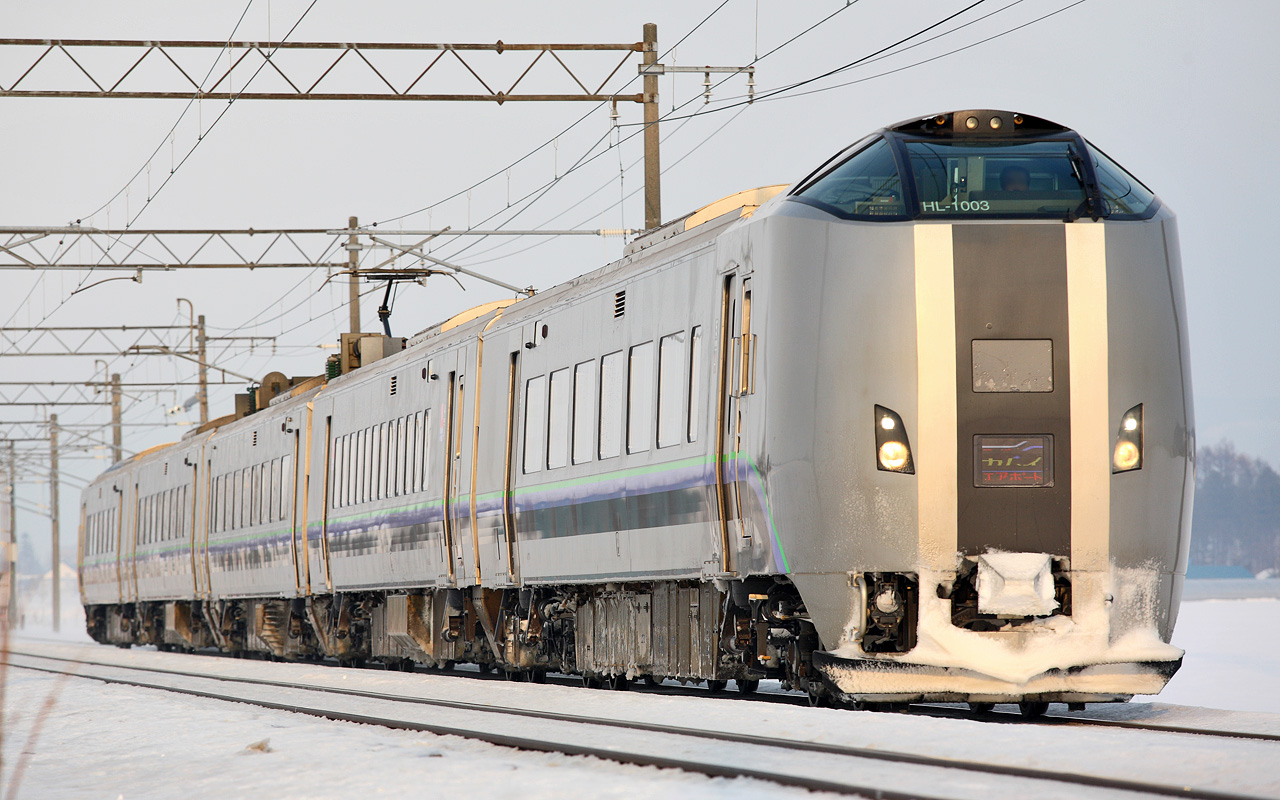
A 789-1000 series set on a Super Kamui/Airport service in January 2009

Prior to the start of the revised timetable on 26 March 2016, services between New Chitose Airport and Asahikawa via Sapporo were operated by five-car 785 series and 789-1000 series trains.

== History ==
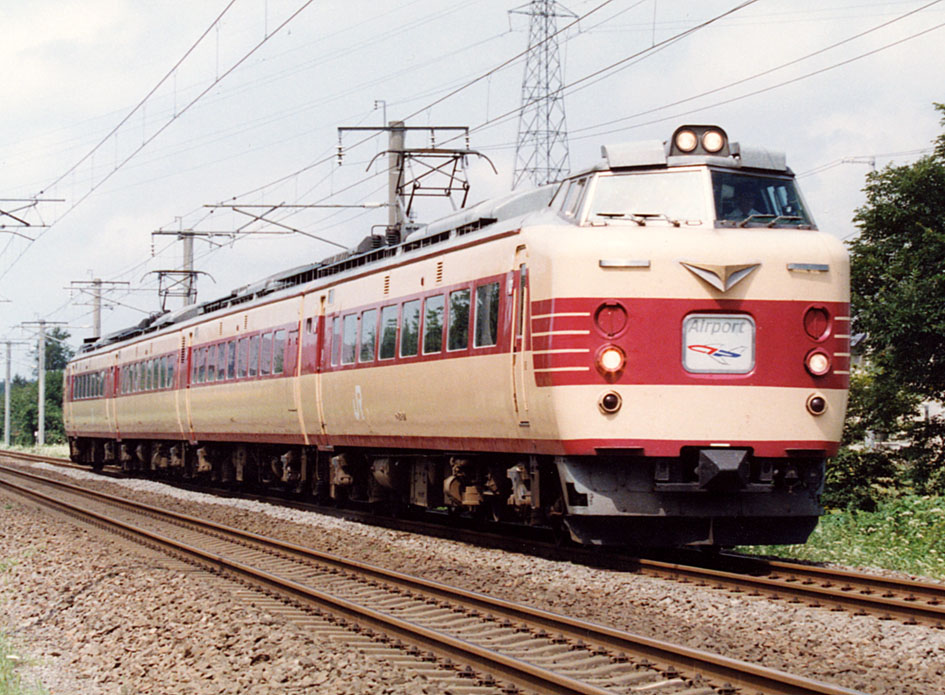
A 781 series set on an Airport service in 1992

The Airport service was first introduced on 1 July 1992 in tandem with the opening of New Chitose Airport as a rapid service between New Chitose Airport and Otaru or Asahikawa via Sapporo. The services that directly operated to Asahikawa were operated as the Lilac limited express service between Sapporo and Asahikawa. The 781 series was initially deployed for services that operated as far as Asahikawa while the other services used the 721 series. On 1 October 2007, the Lilac services merged with the former Super White Arrow services to become Super Kamui services.

On 19 July 2014, the 733-3000 series fleet was introduced on Airport services.

From the start of the revised timetable on 26 March 2016, with the opening of the Hokkaido Shinkansen, the remaining Airport services that continued from Sapporo to Asahikawa as the Super Kamui limited express service were discontinued and limited express train sets were no longer used on Airport services.

On 14 March 2020, the frequency of Airport trains per hour was increased from four to five. In addition, Special Rapid Airport services were introduced.

From the start of the revised timetable on 16 March 2024, all Airport trains that operate as far as Otaru began serving an additional stop at Sōen. In addition, Special Rapid Airport services to and from Otaru were added and a new Semi-Rapid Airport service was introduced, operating between Sapporo and New Chitose Airport during daytime hours only. Rapid Airport services were also designated to stop at all stations between Teine and Otaru during daytime hours.

Starting from 25 October 2024, new 733-4000 series sets entered service, replacing ageing 721 series sets on Airport services.

New 739 series sets are to be introduced on Airport services from the first half of 2027 to also replace the 721 series trains used on these services.
