= 785 series =

Japanese train type

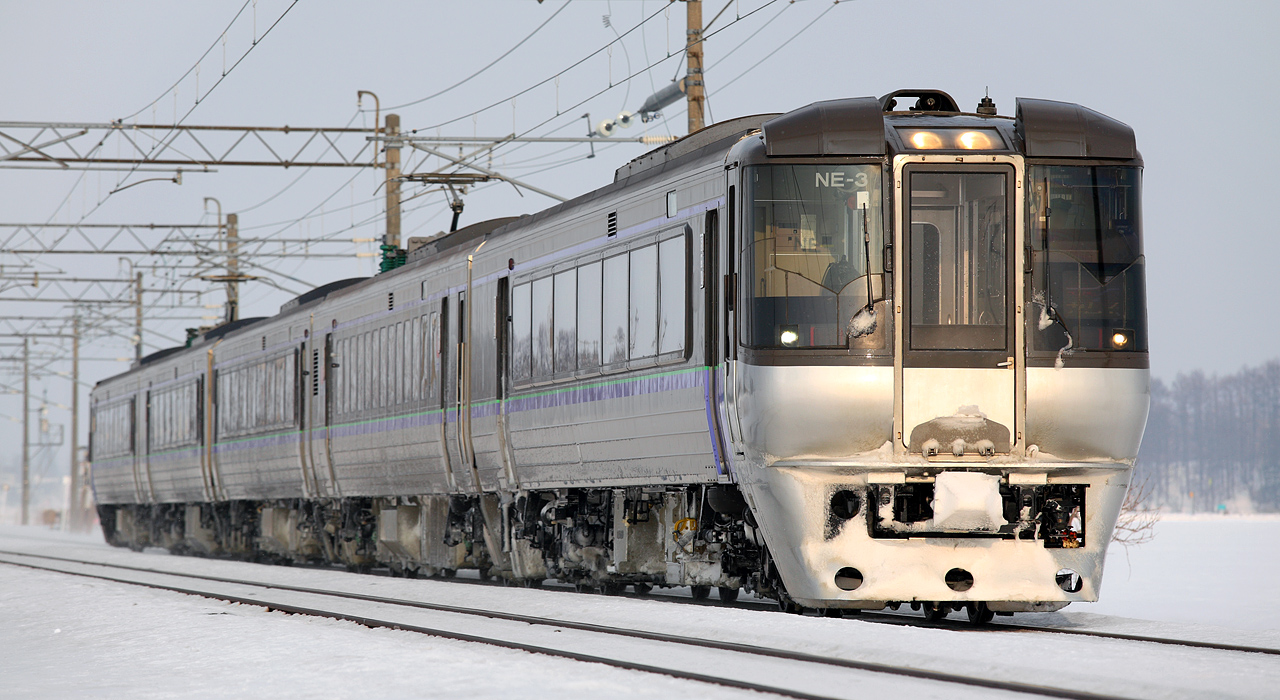
- 785 series on a Super Kamui service, January 2009
- In service: 1990–Present
- Manufacturer: Hitachi, Kawasaki Heavy Industries
- Constructed: 1990–2002
- Refurbished: 2005–2006
- Number built: 37 vehicles
- Number in service: 37 vehicles (8 sets)
- Formation: 2/5 cars per trainset
- Fleet numbers: NE 1–5, NE 501–502
- Operators: JR Hokkaido
- Depots: Sapporo

Specifications
- Car body construction: Stainless steel
- Car length: 21,620 mm (70 ft 11 in) (end cars), 21,300 mm (69 ft 11 in) (intermediate cars)
- Width: 2,954 mm (9 ft 8.3 in)
- Height: 4,090 mm (13 ft 5 in)
- Doors: 2 per side
- Maximum speed: 130 km/h (80 mph)
- Electric system(s): 20 kV AC (50 Hz)
- Current collection: Overhead line
- Track gauge: 1,067 mm (3 ft 6 in)

The 785 series (785系) is an AC electric multiple unit (EMU) train type operated by Hokkaido Railway Company (JR Hokkaido) on Kamui and Suzuran limited express services in Hokkaido, Japan, since 1990.

== Design ==
The trains were built jointly by Hitachi and Kawasaki Heavy Industries.

== Formations ==
=== Sets NE 1–5 ===
Car No.	1	2	3	4	5
Designation	Mc	T	M	M1	Tc'
Numbering	KuMoHa 785	SaHa 784	MoHa 785	MoHa 784-500	KuHa 785
Weight (t)	40.0	37.0	37.3	43.0	34.1
Capacity	60	60	68	49	56

Cars 2 and 4 are each fitted with one N-PS785S single-arm pantograph.

=== Sets NE 501–502 ===
Car No.	1	2	3	4	5
Designation	Mc	TAc	Mc	M1'	TAc'
Numbering	KuMoHa 785-100	KuHa 784	KuMoHa 785-100	MoHa 785-500	KuHa 784
Weight (t)	40.0	38.5	40.0	39.3	38.5
Capacity	60	56	60	49	56

Cars 2 and 5 are each fitted with one N-PS785S single-arm pantograph.

=== Original 2+4-car sets ===
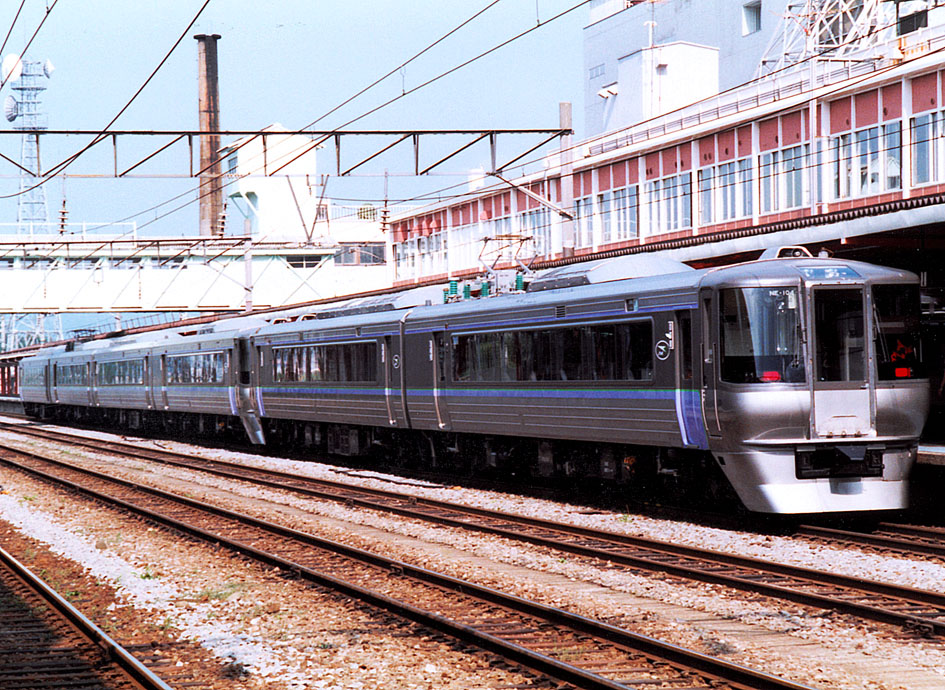
2+4-car formation on a Super White Arrow service, September 1990

(1990–2002)

Car No.	6	5	4	3	2	1
Designation	Mc	TAc'	Mc	TA	M	Tc'
Numbering	KuMoHa 785-100	KuHa 784	KuMoHa 785	SaHa 784	MoHa 785	KuHa 785

Cars 3 and 5 were each fitted with one N-PS721B scissors-type pantograph.

=== 785-300 series Super Hakuchō set NE303 ===
2-car set converted from former stored cars for use on Super Hakuchō services from December 2010

Car No.	7	8
Numbering	MoHa 785-303	KuHa 784-303

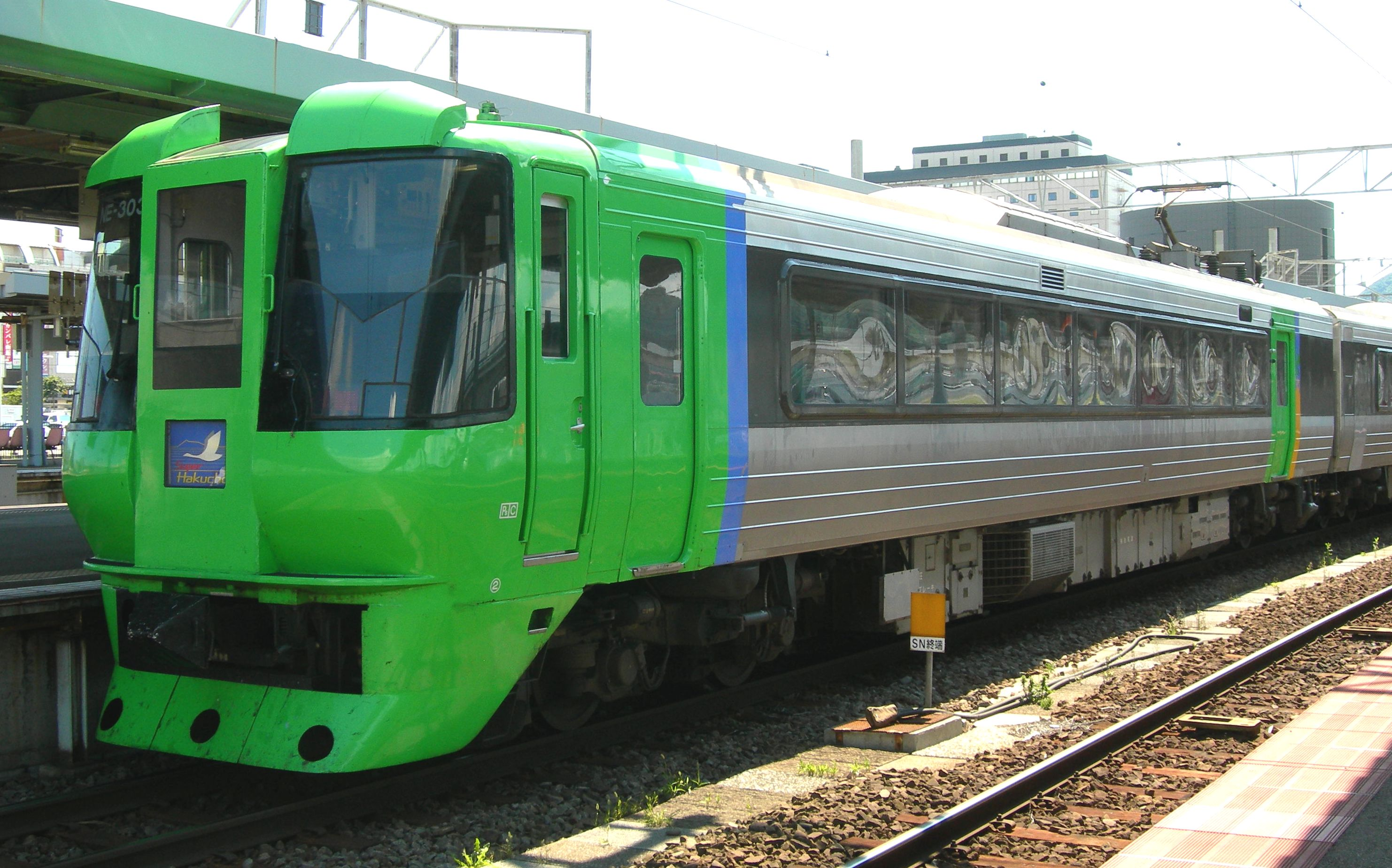
KuHa 784-300, August 2011

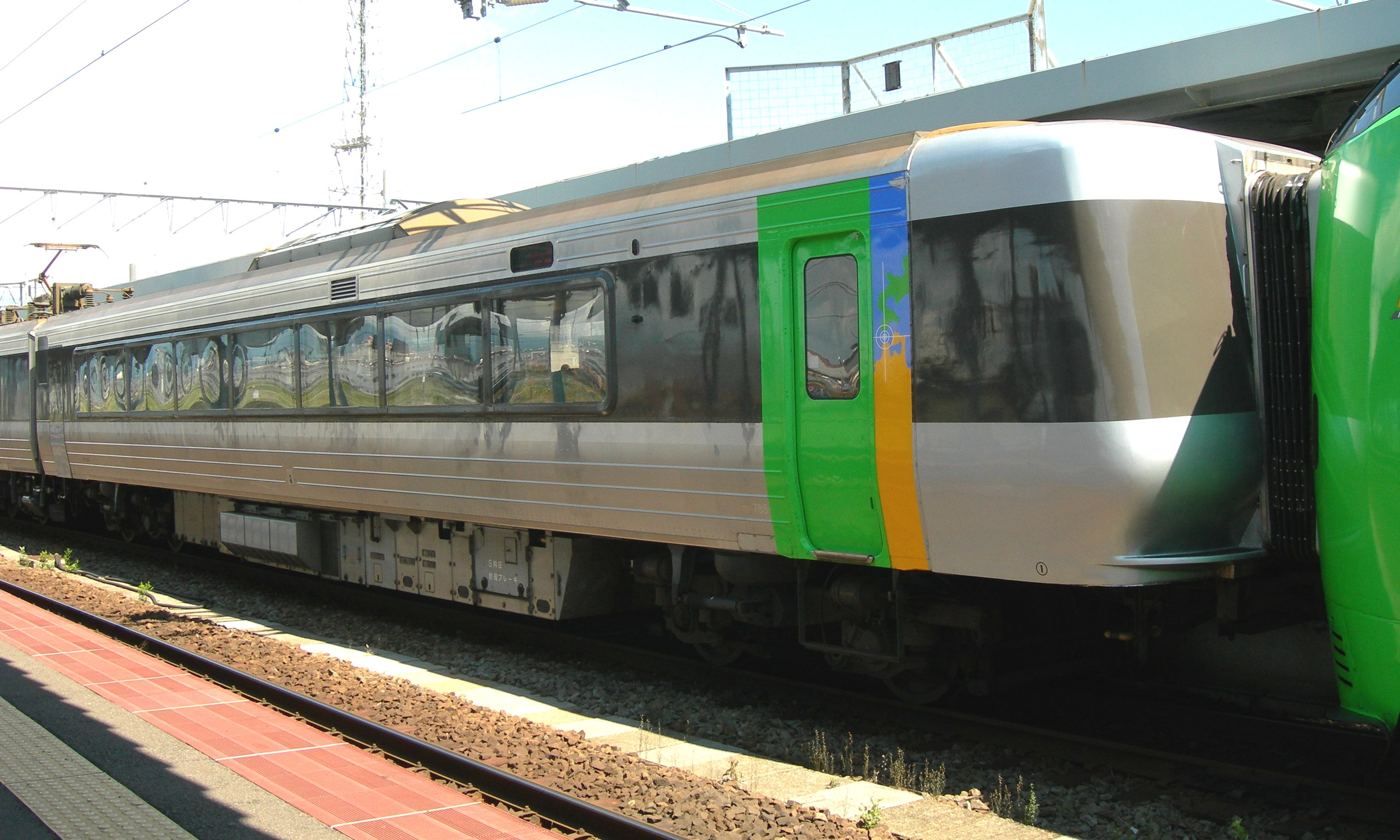
MoHa 785-300, August 2011

== Interior ==
The 785 series trainsets do not include Green class (first class) accommodation, but car 4 is designated as a "u-Seat" car with improved seating for reserved seat passengers. All other cars are normally designated as non-reserved seating.

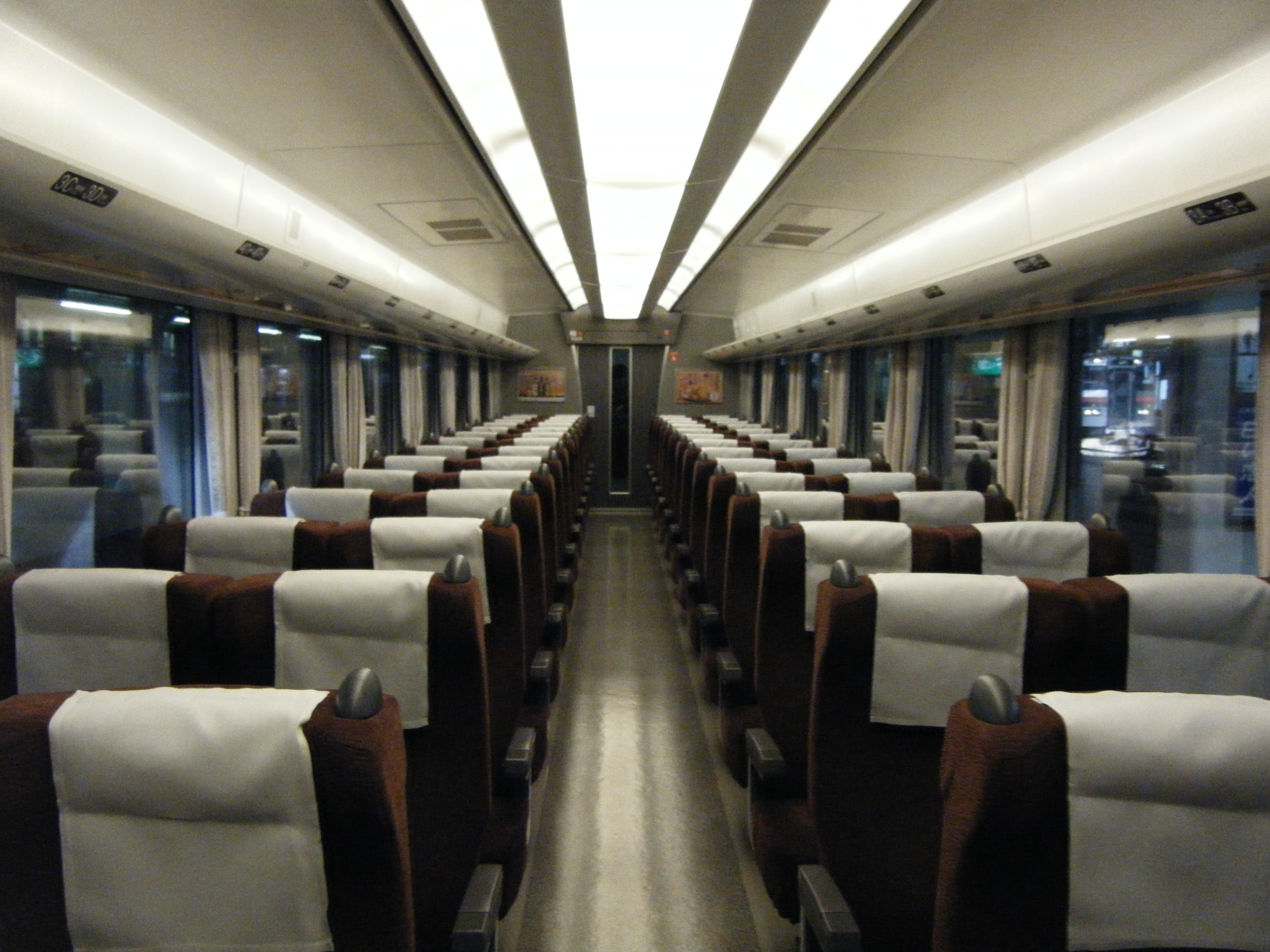
Interior view, May 2008

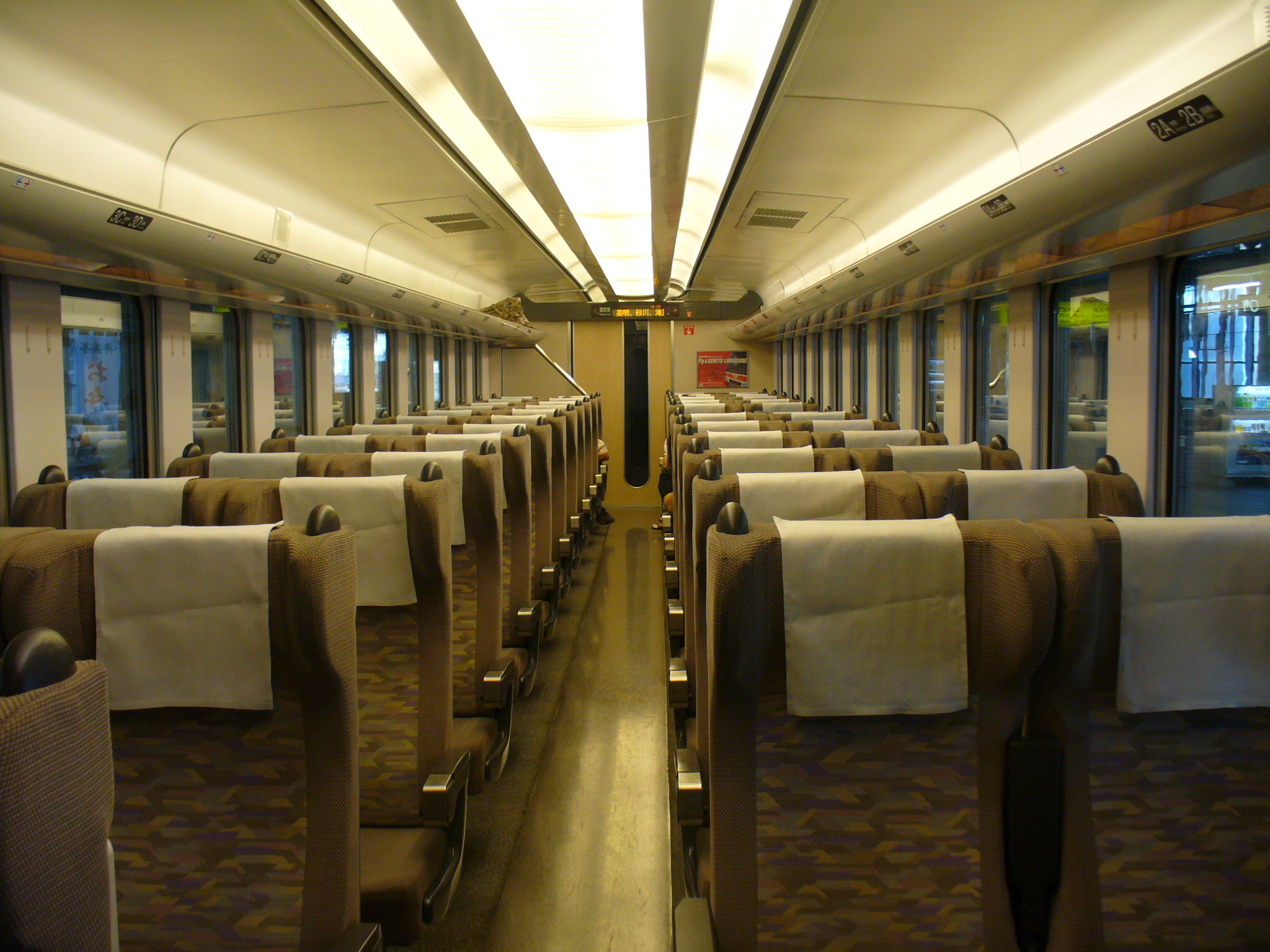
Interior view of "u-Seat" car 4, August 2007

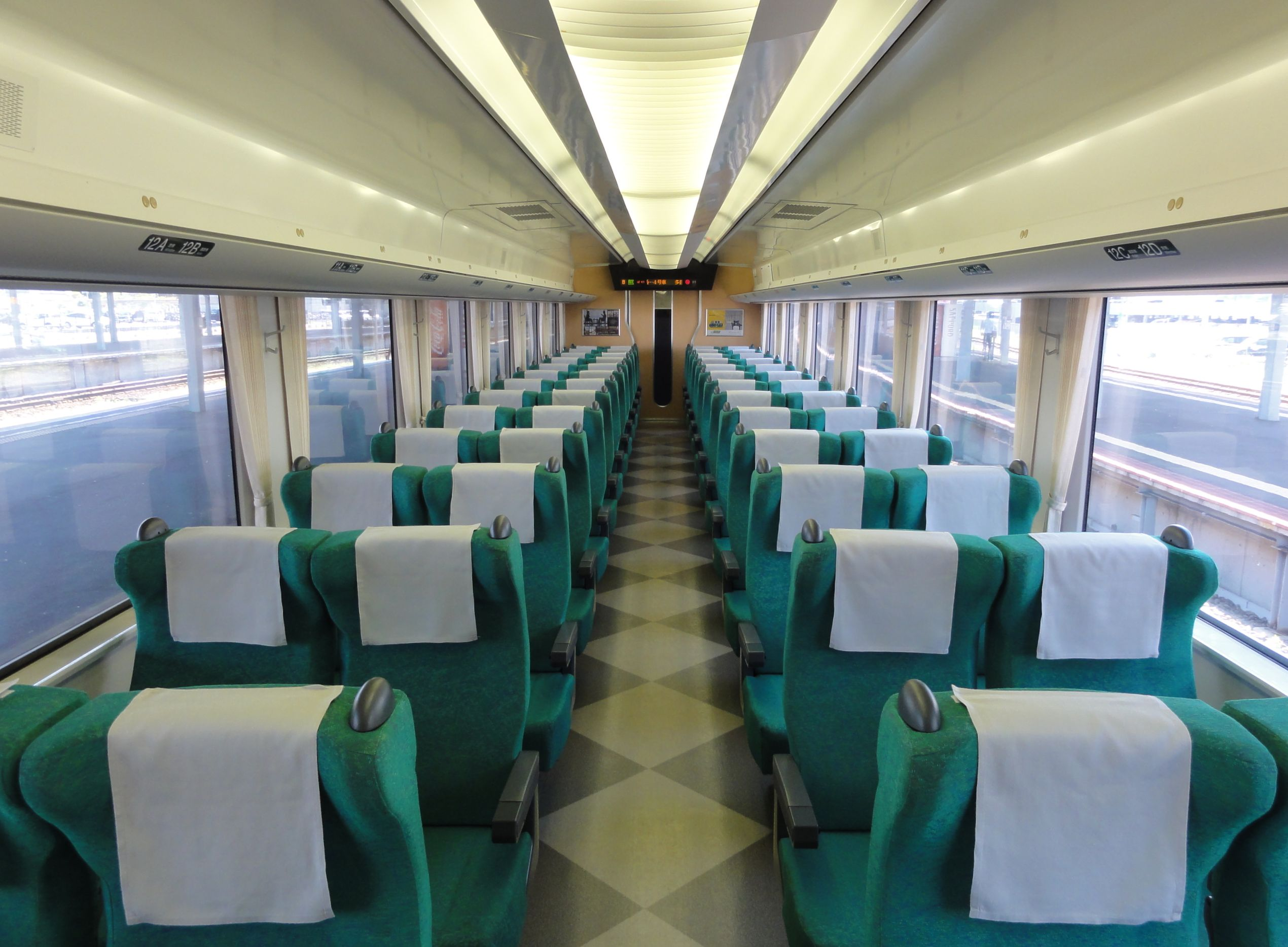
Interior view of Super Hakuchō KuHa 784-300, August 2011

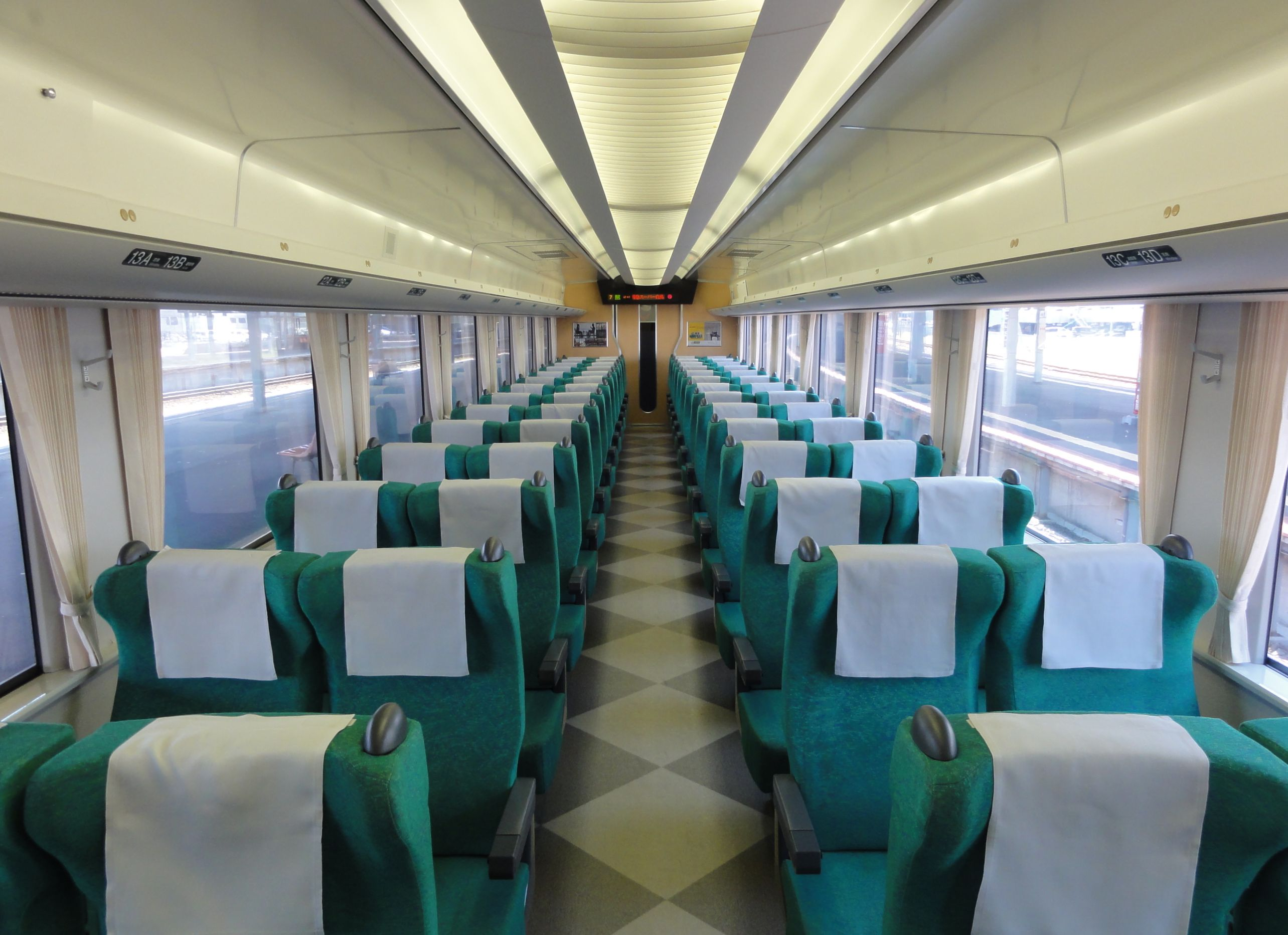
Interior view of Super Hakuchō MoHa 785-300, August 2011

== History ==
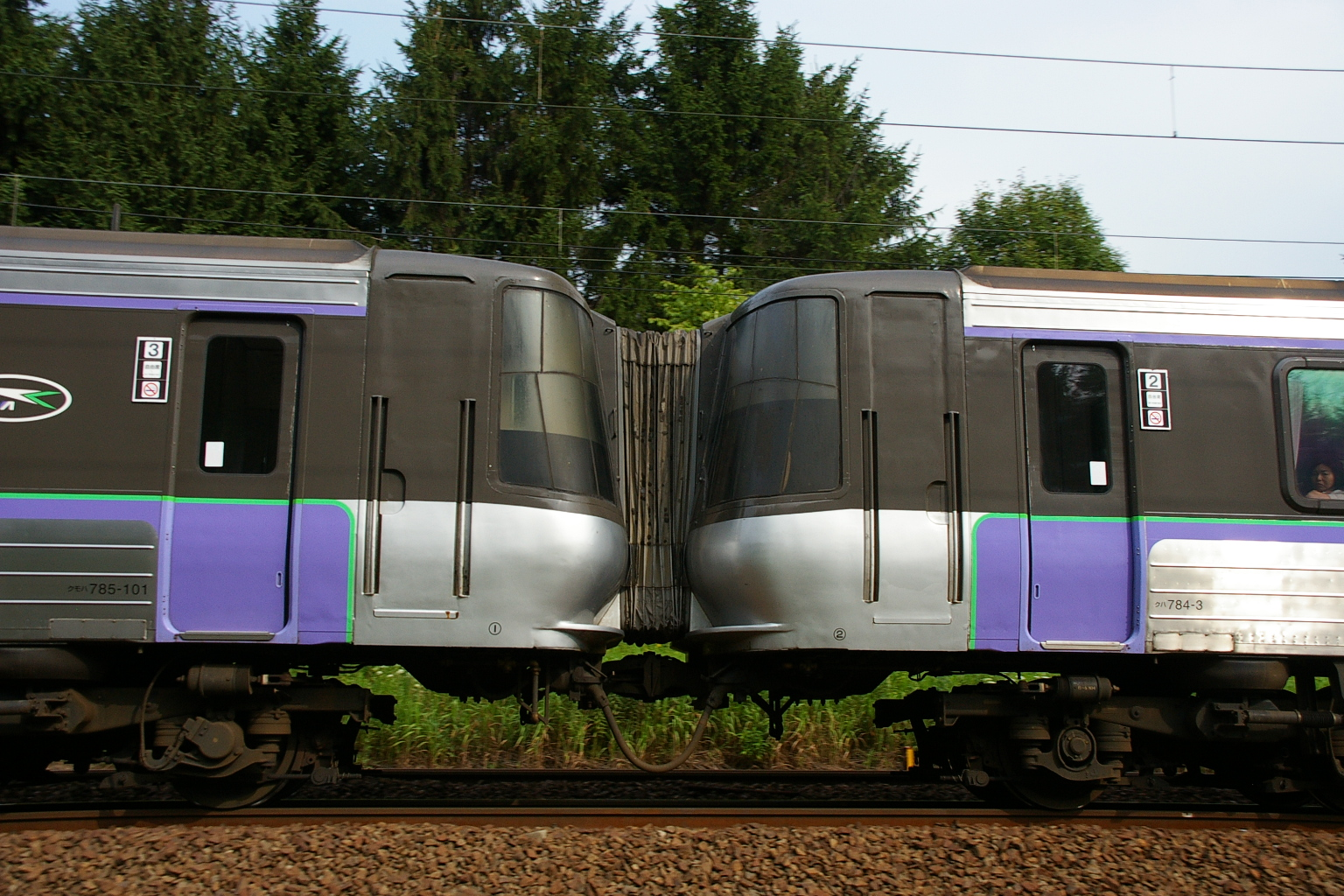
Former driving cars with blanked off doors, 2008

30 vehicles were delivered in 1990, formed as five 2-car (NE 101–105) and five 4-car (NE 1–5) sets. These entered service from 1 September 1990 on new Super White Arrow limited express services between Sapporo and Asahikawa. Sets were also used on some Lilac services.

From 18 February 2002, the original 4- and 2-car sets were reformed with the addition of newly built MoHa 784-500 and MoHa 785-500 cars to create a fleet of seven 5-car sets and one spare 2-car set, which was kept in storage. The control equipment from the cabs of cars within sets was removed between 2007 and 2008.

From 1 October 2007, they were reassigned to new Super Kamui limited express services between Sapporo and Asahikawa, and Airport rapid services between Sapporo and New Chitose Airport in conjunction with 789-1000 series EMUs.

The spare 2-car set, NE 105, stored out of use since 2002 was modified in 2010 and repainted with green cab ends for use in conjunction with 789 series sets on Super Hakuchō services from the start of the revised timetable on 4 December 2010. This set has a maximum speed of 140 km/h.
