= White Arrow =

Japanese limited express train service

White Arrow Super White Arrow
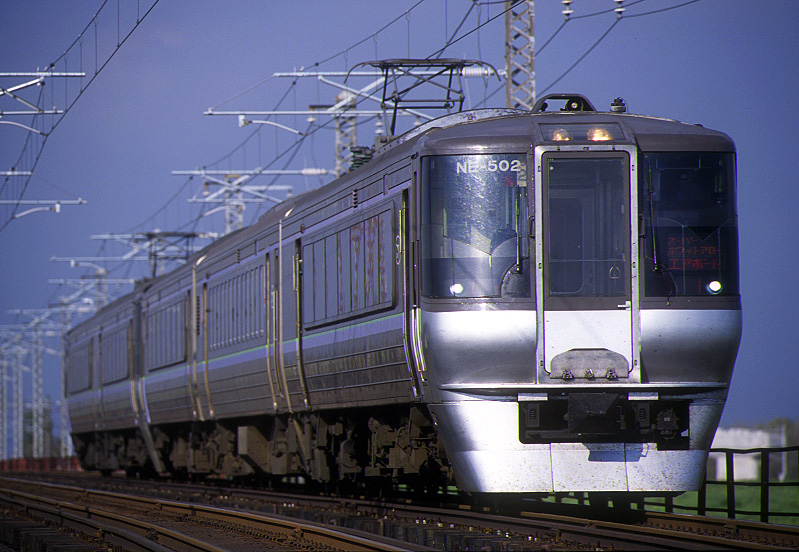
- 785 series EMU on a Super White Arrow service, October 2002

Overview
- Service type: Limited express
- Locale: Hokkaido
- First service: 3 March 1986 (White Arrow); 1 September 1990 (Super White Arrow)
- Last service: 30 September 2007
- Successor: Super Kamui
- Current operator(s): JR Hokkaido
- Former operator(s): JNR

Route
- Termini: Sapporo; Asahikawa
- Distance travelled: 136.8 km
- Average journey time: 1 hr 20 mins

Technical
- Rolling stock: 781 series & 785 series EMUs
- Track gauge: 1,067 mm (3 ft 6 in)
- Electrification: 20 kV AC overhead
- Operating speed: 130 km/h (80 mph)

The White Arrow (ホワイトアロー, howaito arō), and later Super White Arrow (スーパーホワイトアロー, sūpā howaito arō) were limited express train services operated by Hokkaido Railway Company (JR Hokkaido) on the Hakodate Main Line between the cities of Sapporo and Asahikawa in Hokkaido, Japan, between 1986 and 2007.

== History ==
White Arrow services began on 3 March 1986 as a new limited express operating between Sapporo and Asahikawa via the Hakodate Main Line, supplementing the existing Lilac services also operating between Sapporo and Asahikawa.

From 1 September 1990, the service was renamed Super White Arrow with the introduction of new 785 series EMUs.

Services were discontinued from the start of the 1 October 2007 timetable revision when the Super White Arrow was combined with the Lilac service to form the new Super Kamui service.

== Service pattern ==
White Arrow services served the following stations:

- Sapporo - Iwamizawa - Fukagawa - Asahikawa

Super White Arrow services operated at hourly intervals, with 13 return workings daily, departing on the hour from Sapporo and Asahikawa, and served the following stations:

- Sapporo - Iwamizawa - Bibai (some trains only) - Sunagawa (some trains only) - Takikawa - Fukagawa - Asahikawa

The Super White Arrow services operated at a maximum speed of 130 km/h, with an average speed of 102.6 km/h, completing the 136.8 km journey in 1 hour and 20 minutes.

== Rolling stock ==
- 781 series 4-car EMUs (White Arrow) 1986–1990
- 785 series 4/6-car (later 5-car) EMUs (Super White Arrow) 1990–2007
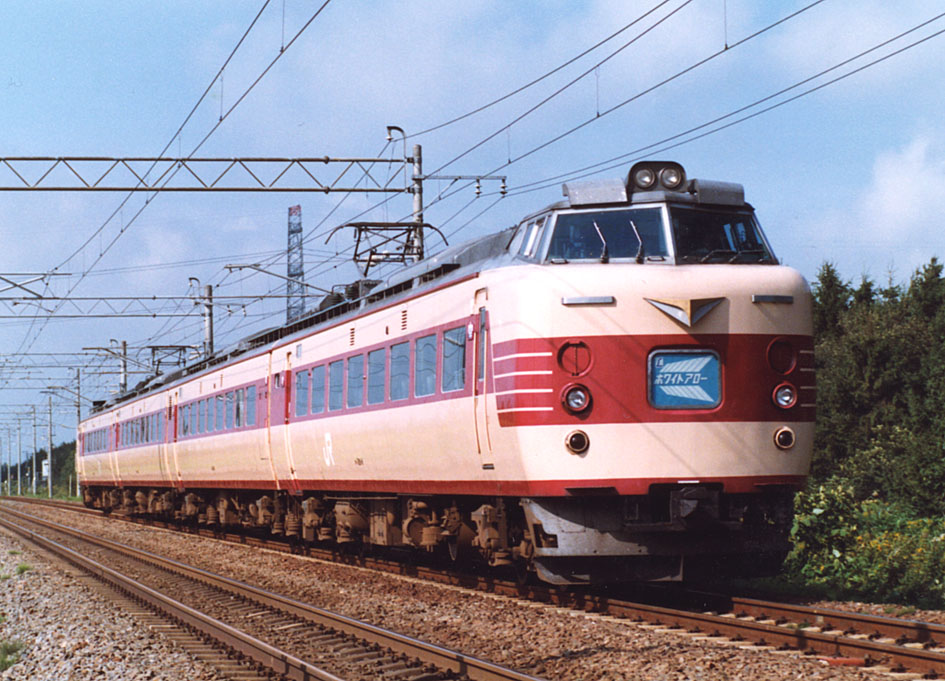
781 series EMU on a White Arrow service, 1990

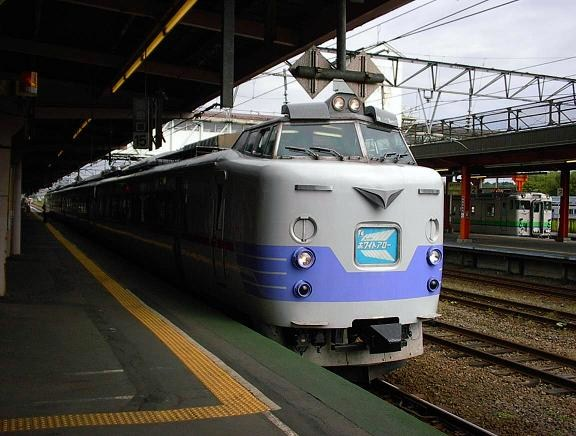
781 series substituting on a Super White Arrow service, June 2004

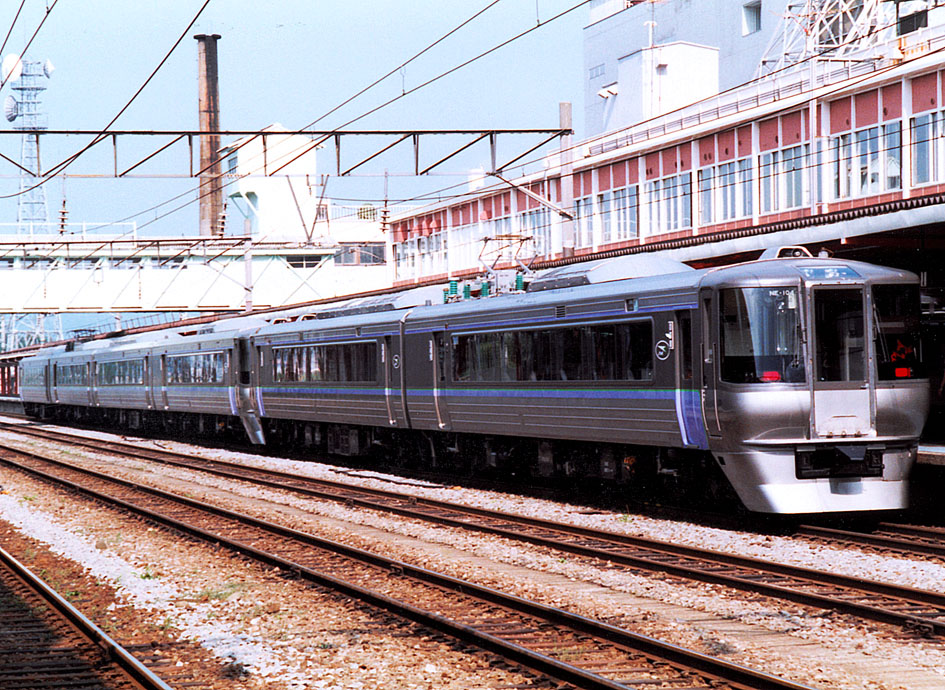
785 series on a Super White Arrow service, 1990
