= Kamui (train) =

Train service in Japan

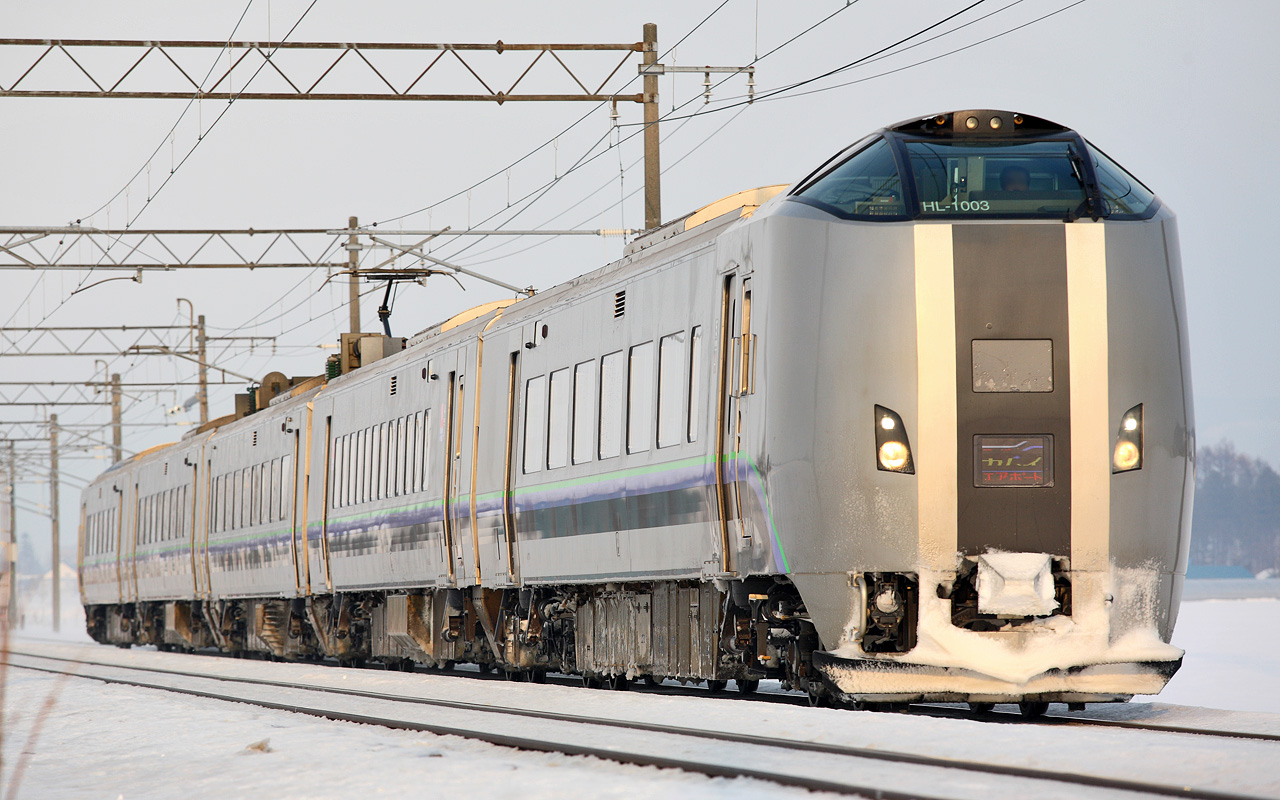
- A 789-1000 series EMU on a Super Kamui / Airport service in January 2009

Overview
- Service type: Limited express
- Locale: Hokkaido
- First service: 22 September 1959 (Kamui); 1 October 2007 (Super Kamui); 4 March 2017 (Kamui)
- Current operator: JR Hokkaido
- Former operator: JNR

Route
- Termini: Sapporo; Asahikawa
- Distance travelled: 136.8 km (85.0 mi)
- Average journey time: 1 hour 20 minutes
- Service frequency: Half-hourly

On-board services
- Class: Standard class only

Technical
- Rolling stock: 789-1000 series EMUs
- Track gauge: 1,067 mm (3 ft 6 in)
- Electrification: 20 kV AC overhead
- Operating speed: 130 km/h (80 mph)

The Kamui (カムイ) (named Super Kamui (スーパーカムイ) between 2007 and 2017) is a limited express train service operated by Hokkaido Railway Company (JR Hokkaido) since 2007 on the Hakodate Main Line, connecting Sapporo and Asahikawa in Hokkaido, Japan.

== Service pattern ==
Services run every 30 minutes, with a journey time of 1 hour and 20 minutes for the 136.8 km (85.0 mi) between Sapporo and Asahikawa, giving an average start-to-stop speed of 102.6 km/h (63.8 mph). Up until the opening of the Hokkaido Shinkansen on 26 March 2016, services departing from Asahikawa on the hour continue from Sapporo to New Chitose Airport as Airport rapid services, reversing direction at Sapporo vice-versa.

Services stop at the following stations.

- Sapporo
- Iwamizawa
- Bibai
- Sunagawa
- Takikawa
- Fukagawa
- Asahikawa

== Rolling stock ==
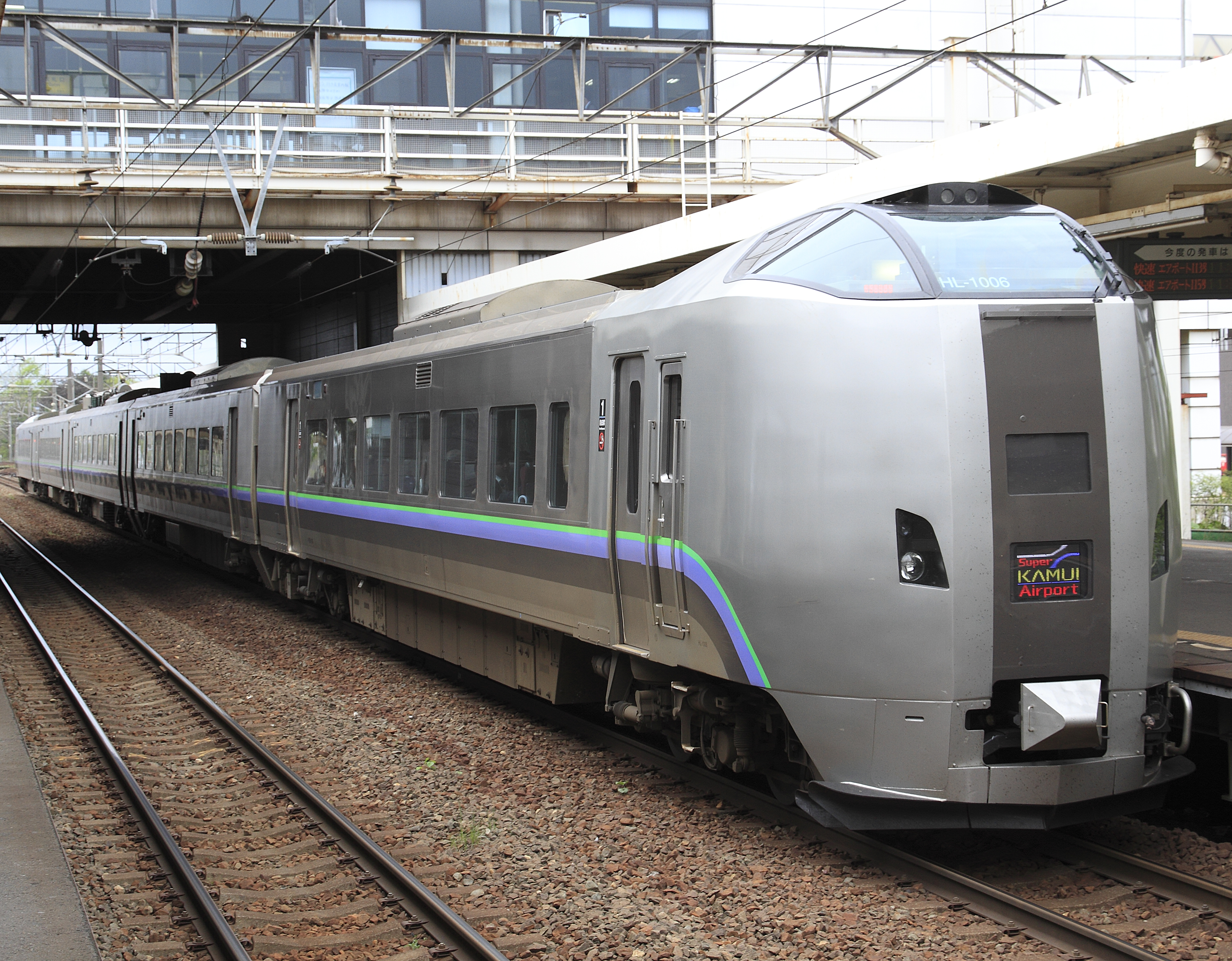
A 789-1000 series EMU on an Airport/Super Kamui service in May 2011

Services are formed of five-car 789-1000 series EMUs. All seats are non-reserved, except for car 4, which has upgraded "u-Seat" accommodation, including AC outlets for personal use.

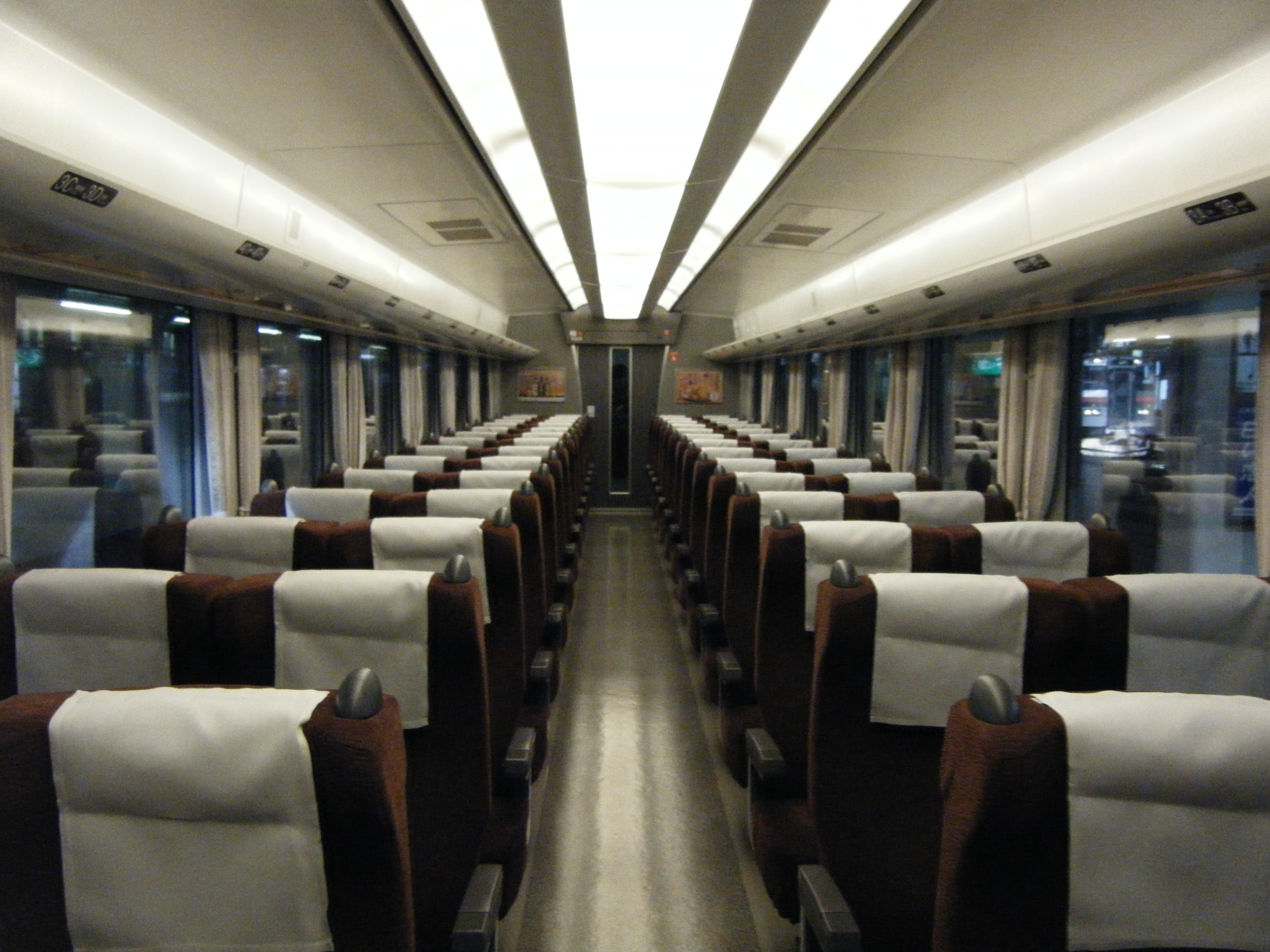
785 series non-reserved seating, May 2008

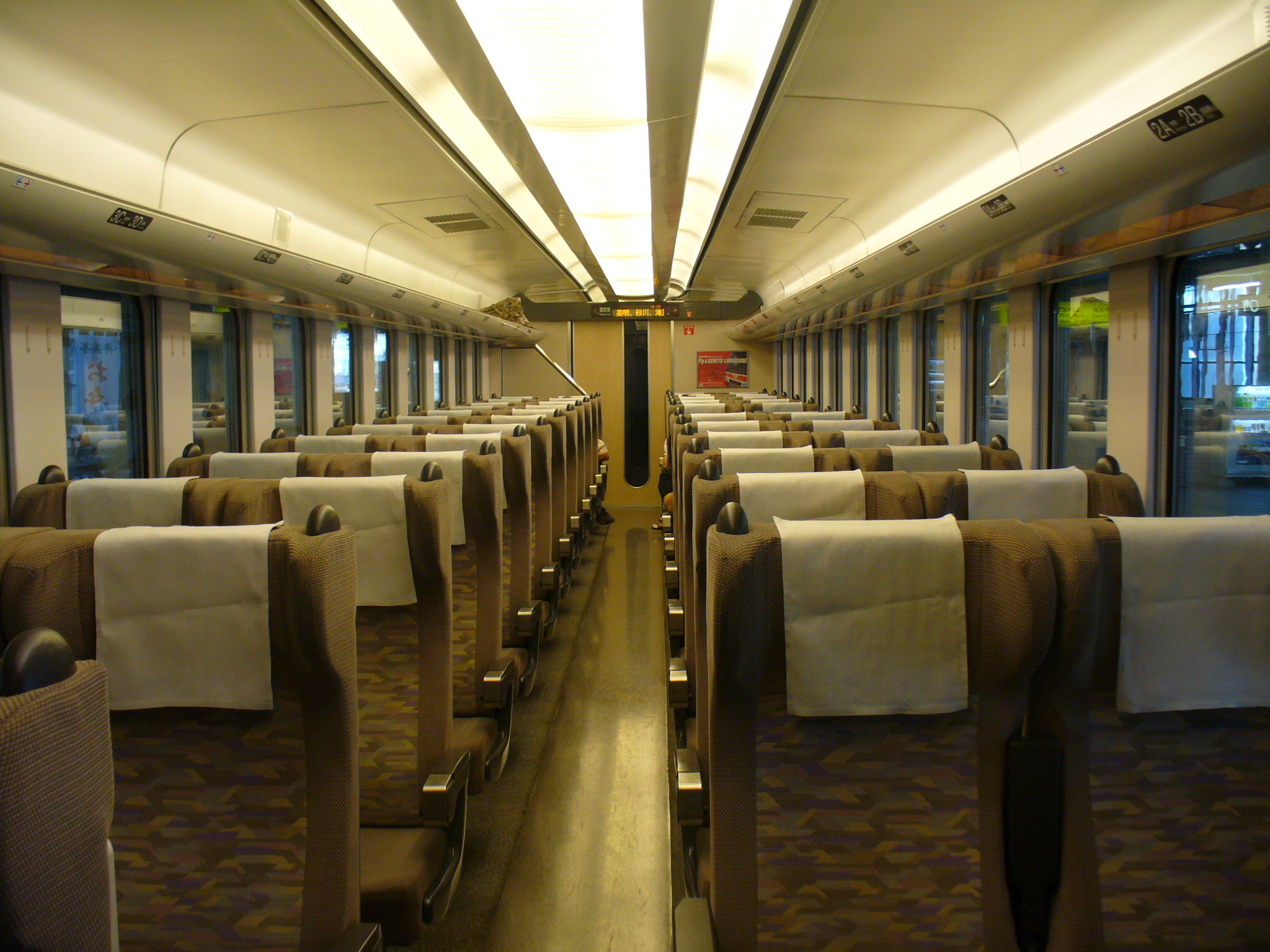
785 series reserved "u-Seat" car, August 2007

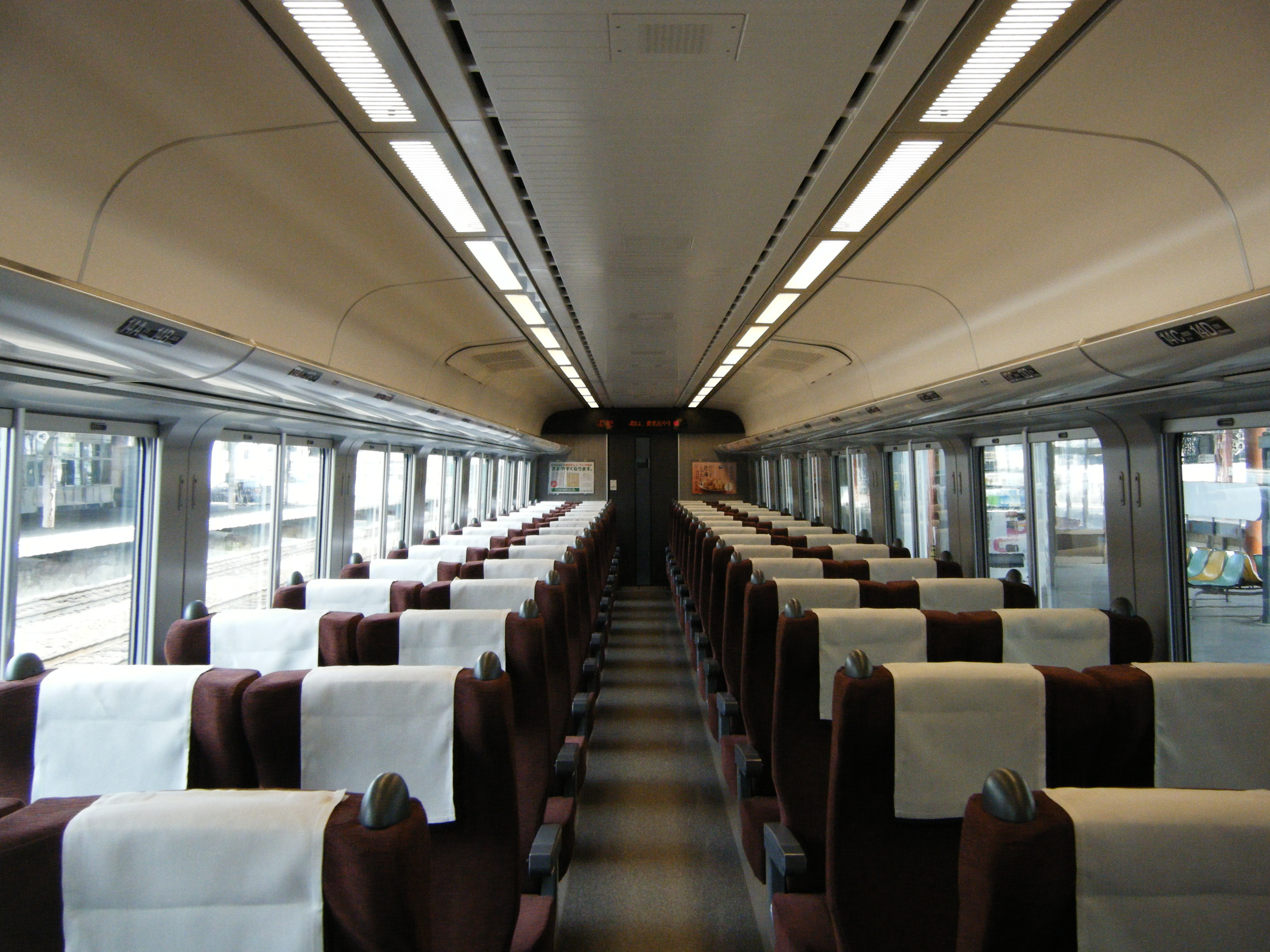
789-1000 series non-reserved seating, May 2008

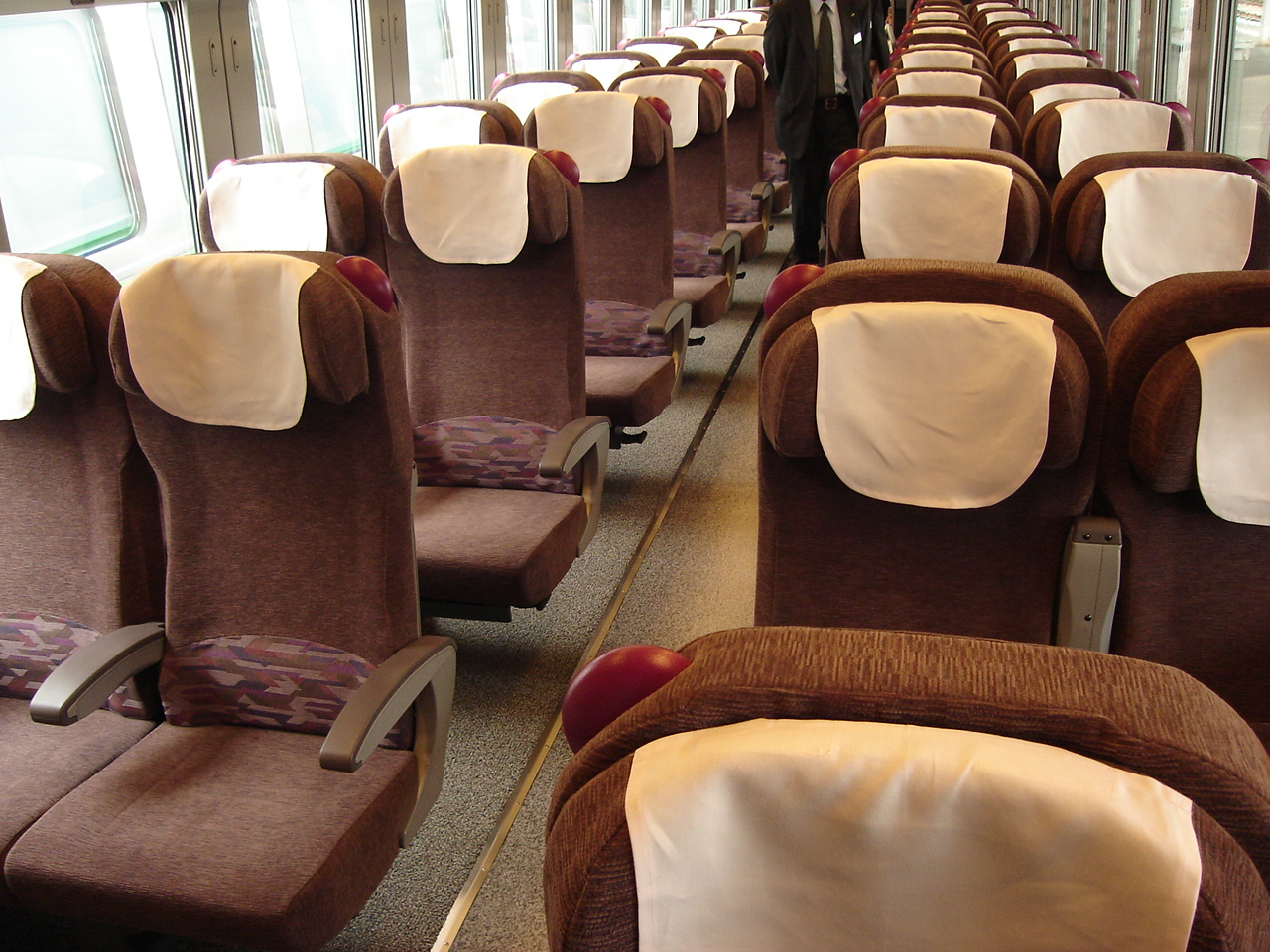
789-1000 series reserved "u-Seat" car, September 2007

=== Formations ===
The Kamui is operated by 5-car 789 series EMUs, formed as shown below, with car 1 at the Asahikawa end. No "Green cars" exist in all departures, and all cars are non-smoking.

==== Future plans ====
On 19 November 2025, JR Hokkaido announced that all non-reserved seating on Kamui services would be eliminated effective the next timetable revision, making all trains operate solely with reserved seating.

Car No.	1	2	3	4	5
Accommodation	Non-reserved	Non-reserved	Non-reserved	Reserved (u-Seat)	Non-reserved
Facilities		Toilet		Wheelchair space, toilet	Toilet

== History ==
=== Kamui (1959–1988) ===
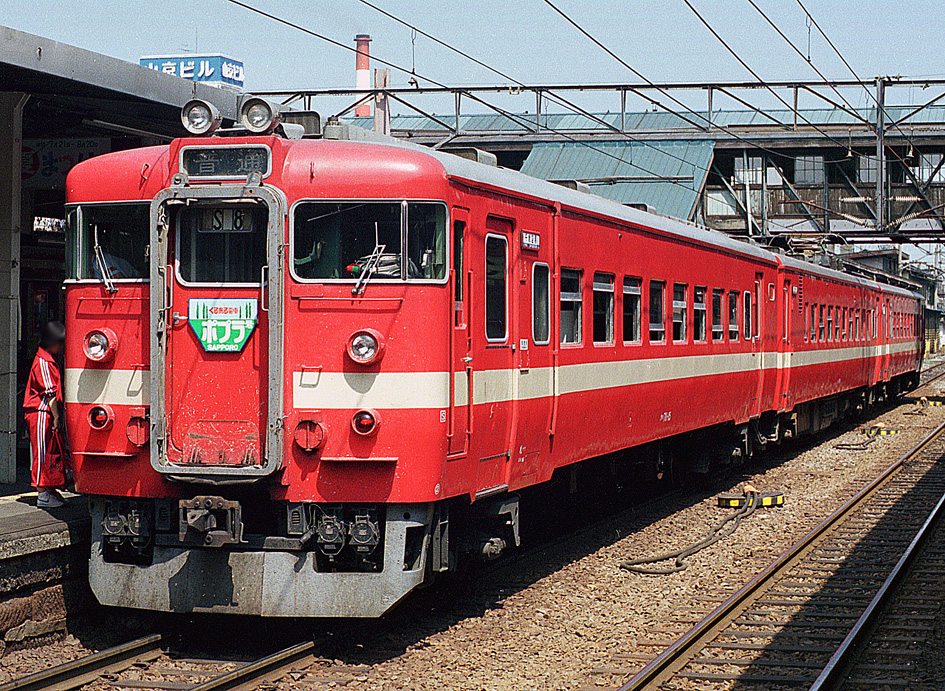
A JNR 711 series EMU in 1986

The original Kamui service started on 22 September 1959, as a "semi-express" service operating between Otaru and Asahikawa. From 1961, KiHa 56 express diesel multiple unit trains were introduced, and Kamui services were formally upgraded to "express" status from the start of the revised timetable on 5 March 1966. Following the electrification of the route, 711 series three-car EMUs were introduced on the Kamui 3 and 4 services from October 1968. From 1 October 1969, these were increased to six-car formations.

Typical 711 series EMU Kamui express formations were formed below as of 1 October 1969, with car 1 at the Asahikawa end.

Car No.	1	2	3	4	5	6
Numbering	KuHa 711	MoHa 711	KuHa 711	KuHa 711	MoHa 711	KuHa 711

From 15 March 1972, Kamui services increased daily from seven to ten return workings.

Kamui services were discontinued on 13 March 1988, when they were integrated with Sorachi express services.

=== Super Kamui (2007–2017) ===
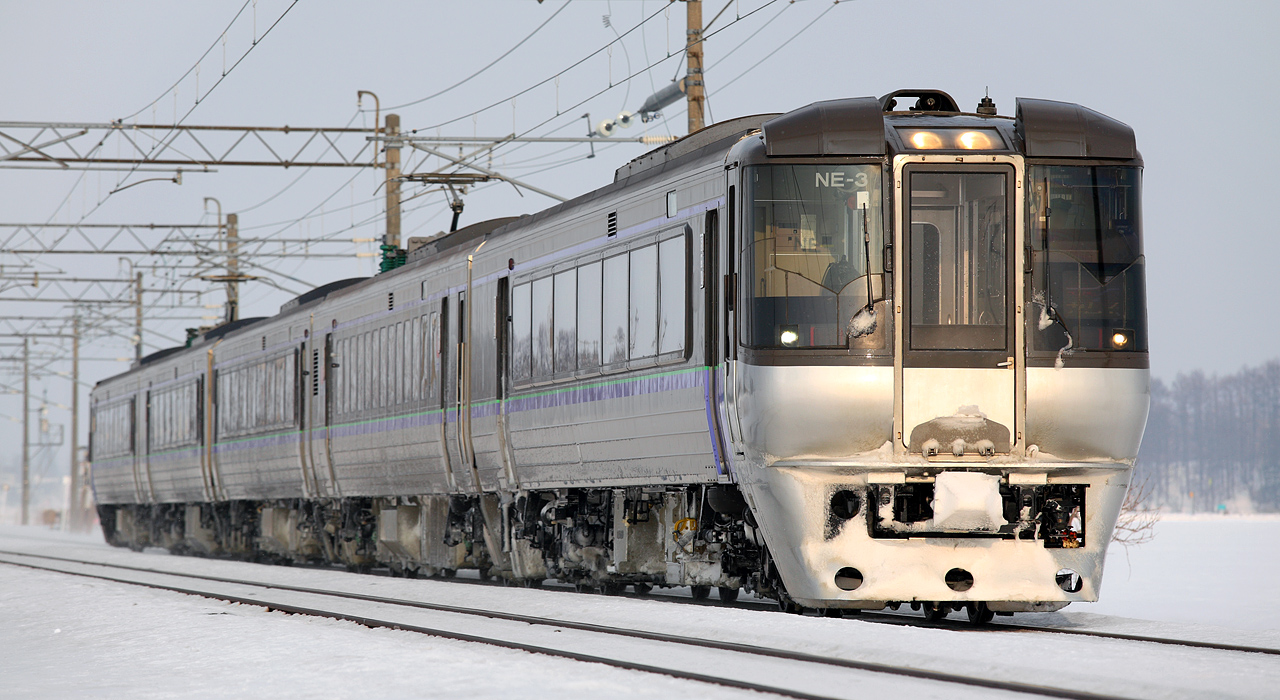
A 785 series EMU on a Super Kamui service in January 2009

The Super Kamui service commenced on 1 October 2007. Before this, two limited express trains, the Lilac and the Super White Arrow, ran on the same route between Sapporo and Asahikawa. These were integrated and remodeled into one service simultaneously, as the ageing 781 series EMUs previously used on Lilac services were withdrawn.

=== Kamui (2017–present) ===
From the start of the revised timetable on 4 March 2017, Super Kamui services were renamed simply Kamui, and are complemented by newly-introduced Lilac limited express services on the same route, which use six-car 789-0 series EMUs.

== Accidents ==
On 29 January 2010, the Super Kamui 24 service from Asahikawa to Sapporo was derailed after hitting a truck at a level crossing on the Hakodate Main Line between Fukagawa and Moseushi. 23 passengers, the train driver, and the truck driver sustained minor injuries. The five-car 789-1000 series set involved, HL-1005, was removed from service due to damage and was officially withdrawn on 24 March 2011.
