= 789 series =

Japanese train type

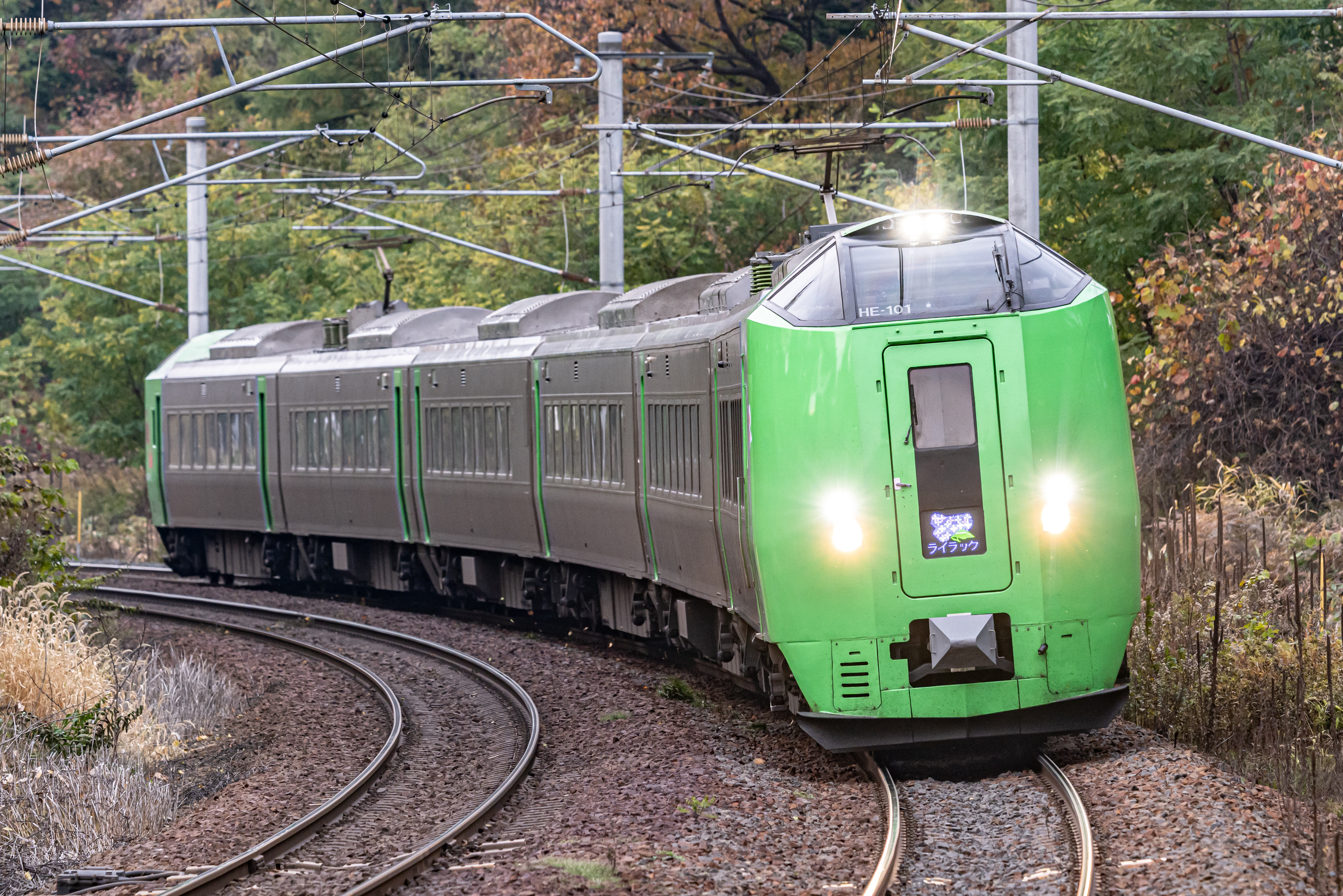
- 789 series on a Lilac service in October 2025
- In service: 2002–present
- Manufacturer: Kawasaki Heavy Industries
- Replaced: 485 series, 781 series
- Constructed: 2002–2011
- Number built: 75 vehicles
- Number in service: 70 vehicles
- Number scrapped: 5 vehicles (accident damage)
- Formation: 5–8 cars per trainset
- Operators: JR Hokkaido
- Depots: Hakodate (789 series), Sapporo (789-1000 series)

Specifications
- Car body construction: Stainless steel
- Car length: 21,670 mm (71 ft 1 in) (end cars); 21,300 mm (69 ft 11 in) (intermediate cars)
- Width: 2,928 mm (9 ft 7 in)
- Height: 4,020 mm (13 ft 2 in)
- Doors: 2 per side
- Maximum speed: 140 km/h (87 mph) (789 series); 130 km/h (81 mph) (789-1000 series)
- Traction system: IGBT-VVVF
- Electric system(s): 20 kV AC (50 Hz)
- Current collection: Overhead line
- Safety system(s): ATS-PS, ATS-DN
- Track gauge: 1,067 mm (3 ft 6 in)

The 789 series (789系) is an AC electric multiple unit (EMU) train type operated by Hokkaido Railway Company (JR Hokkaido) on limited express services in Hokkaido, Japan, since 2002. Two variants exist: the original 789 series for use on Lilac services (formerly used on Super Hakuchō services), and the 789-1000 series for use on Kamui and Suzuran services. Also, it has three related train types, the KiHa 261 series, KiHa 281 series and KiHa 283 series, all of which run on diesel.

== Lilac 789-0 series ==
A total of 40 cars were built between 2002 and 2005 for use on new Super Hakuchō services introduced from 1 December 2002 between Hachinohe (Shin-Aomori from December 2010) and Hakodate via the undersea Seikan Tunnel coinciding with the opening of the Tōhoku Shinkansen extension to Hachinohe.

The trainsets were formed as four 2-car half sets, HE-101–104, and five 3-car half-sets, HE-201–205, which were coupled to produce 5- or 8-car formations.

From December 2005, new SaHa 789-100 trailer cars were added to the original 2-car sets HE-101–104, and a fifth set, HE-105 was delivered. Two additional 2-car sets, HE-301 and HE-302, were also delivered for extending trains to up to eight cars during period seasons.

Two new 3-car sets, HE-106 and HE-206, were delivered in April 2011.

In March 2016, Super Hakucho services were discontinued because the new Hokkaido Shinkansen services ran on the same route, this meant that the 789-0 services (along with the 785-300 series trains) operating on the Super Hakucho services were completely taken out of service.

From the start of the revised timetable on 4 March 2017, Lilac limited express services were reintroduced between Sapporo and Asahikawa using six-car 789-0 series EMUs previously used on Super Hakucho services until March 2016. These services complement the Kamui services using five-car 789-1000 series EMUs.

=== December 2002 – December 2005 ===
Car No.	1	2	3	4	5	6	7	8
Designation	Tsc	M1	M2	M3	Tc'	M2	M3	Tc'
Numbering	KuRoHa 789-100	MoHa 788-100	MoHa 789-200	MoHa 788-200	KuHa 789-200	MoHa 789-200	MoHa 788-200	KuHa 789-200

Cars 2, 4, and 7 were each fitted with one N-PS789 single-arm pantograph.

=== December 2005 – March 2016 ===
Car No.	1	2	3	4	5	6	7	8
Designation	Tsc	M1	T	M2	M3	Tc'	M3j	Tc'
Numbering	KuRoHa 789-100	MoHa 788-100	SaHa 789-100	MoHa 789-200	MoHa 788-200	KuHa 789-200	MoHa 788-300	KuHa 789-300
Weight (t)	39.0	42.0	34.5	42.0	43.0	38.0	43.0	38.0
Capacity	29 (15 Grn + 14 Std)	60	68	64	68	56	68	56

Cars 2, 5, and 7 are each fitted with one N-PS789 single-arm pantograph.

=== Interior ===
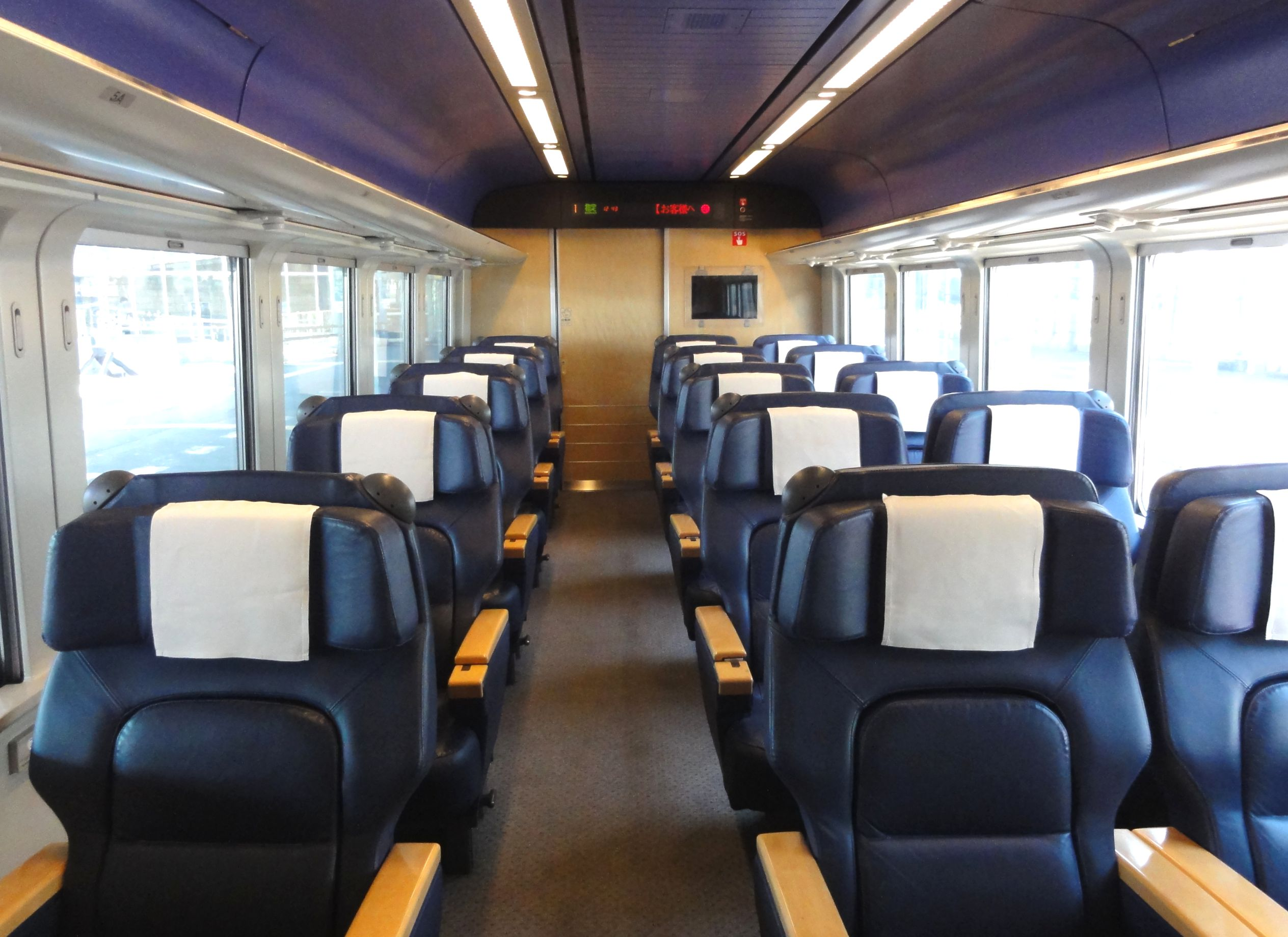
Green class saloon of KuRoHa 789-100 car, August 2011

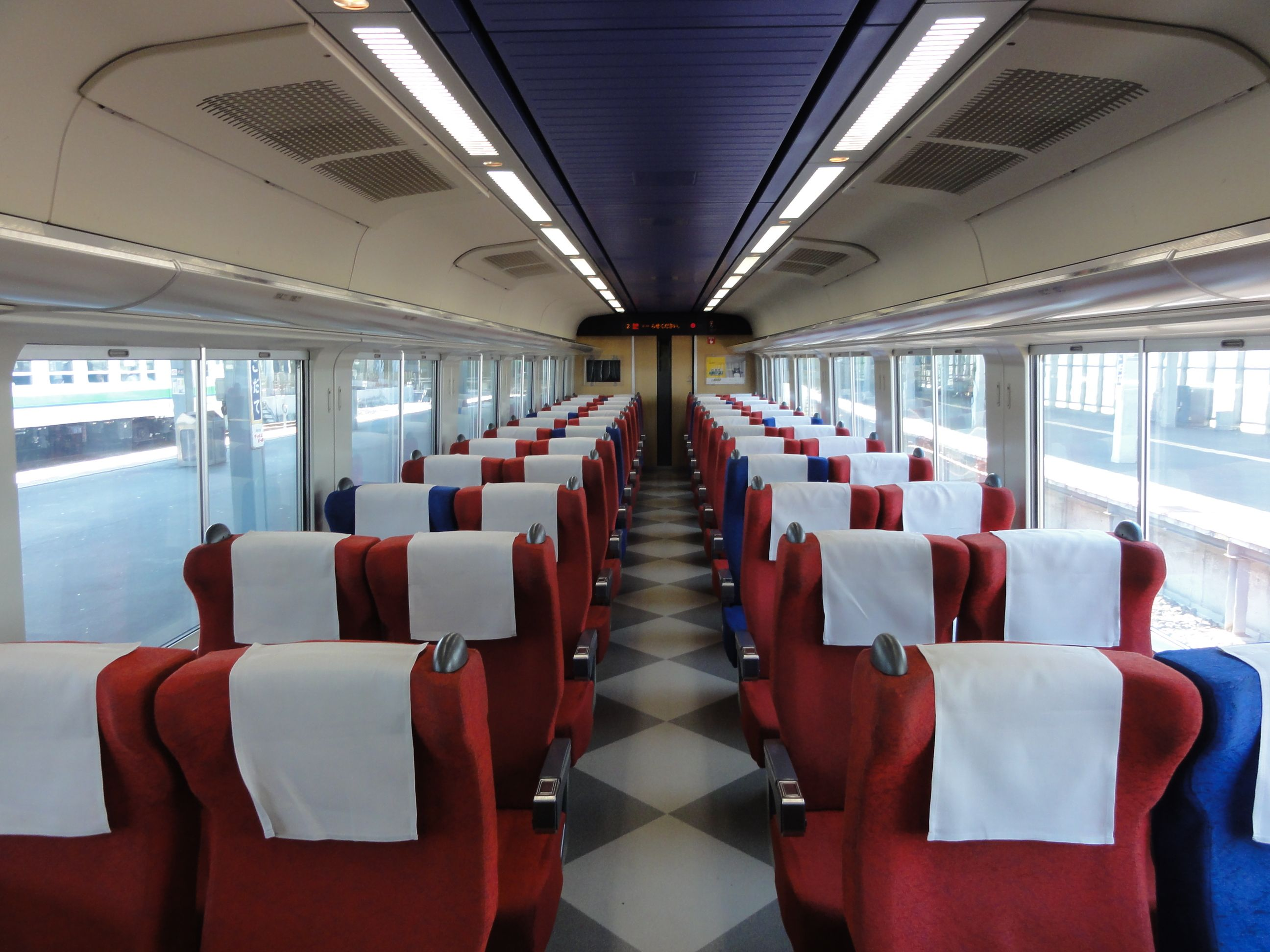
Interior of MoHa 788-100 car, August 2011

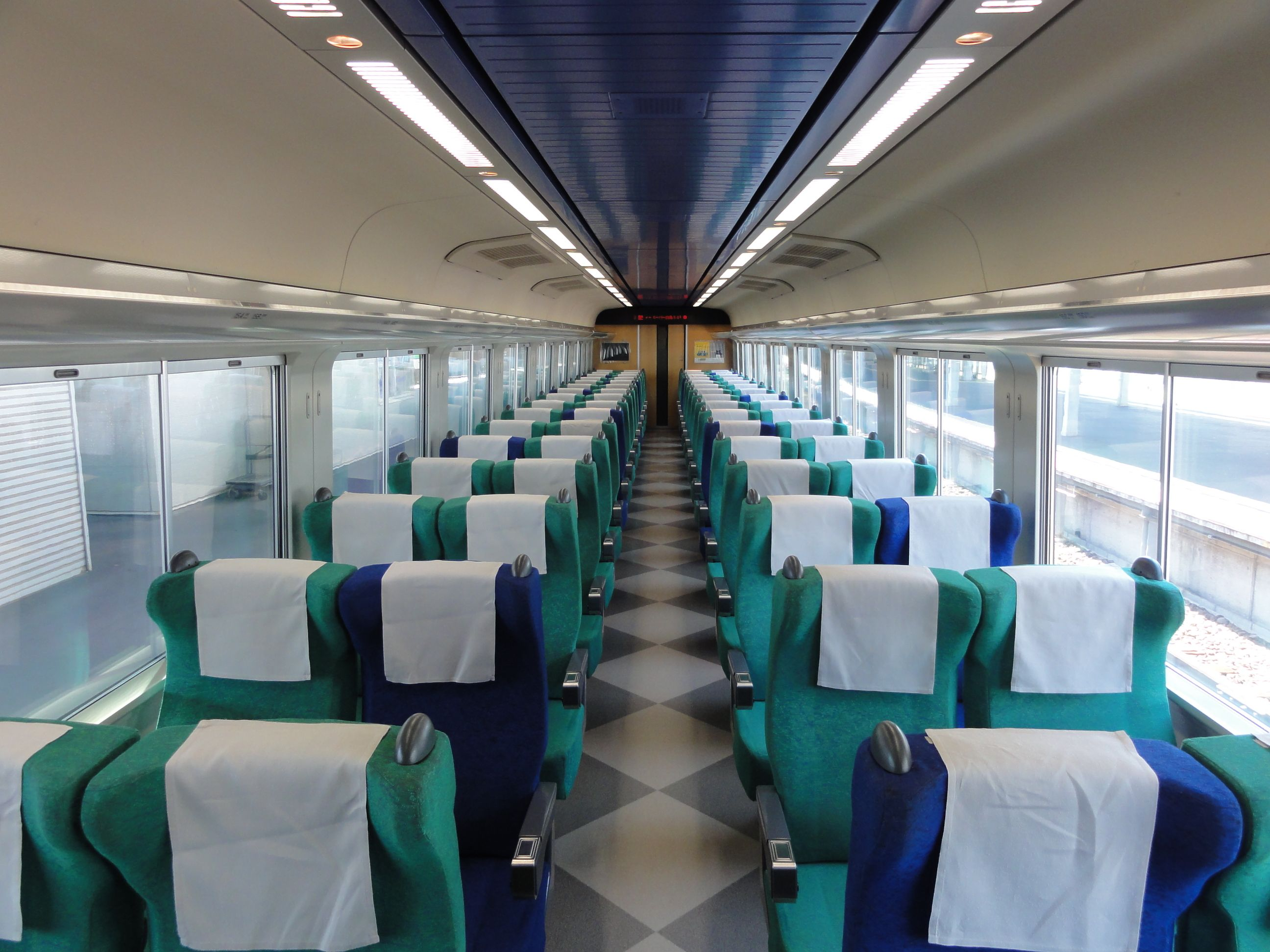
Interior of MoHa 789-200 car, August 2011

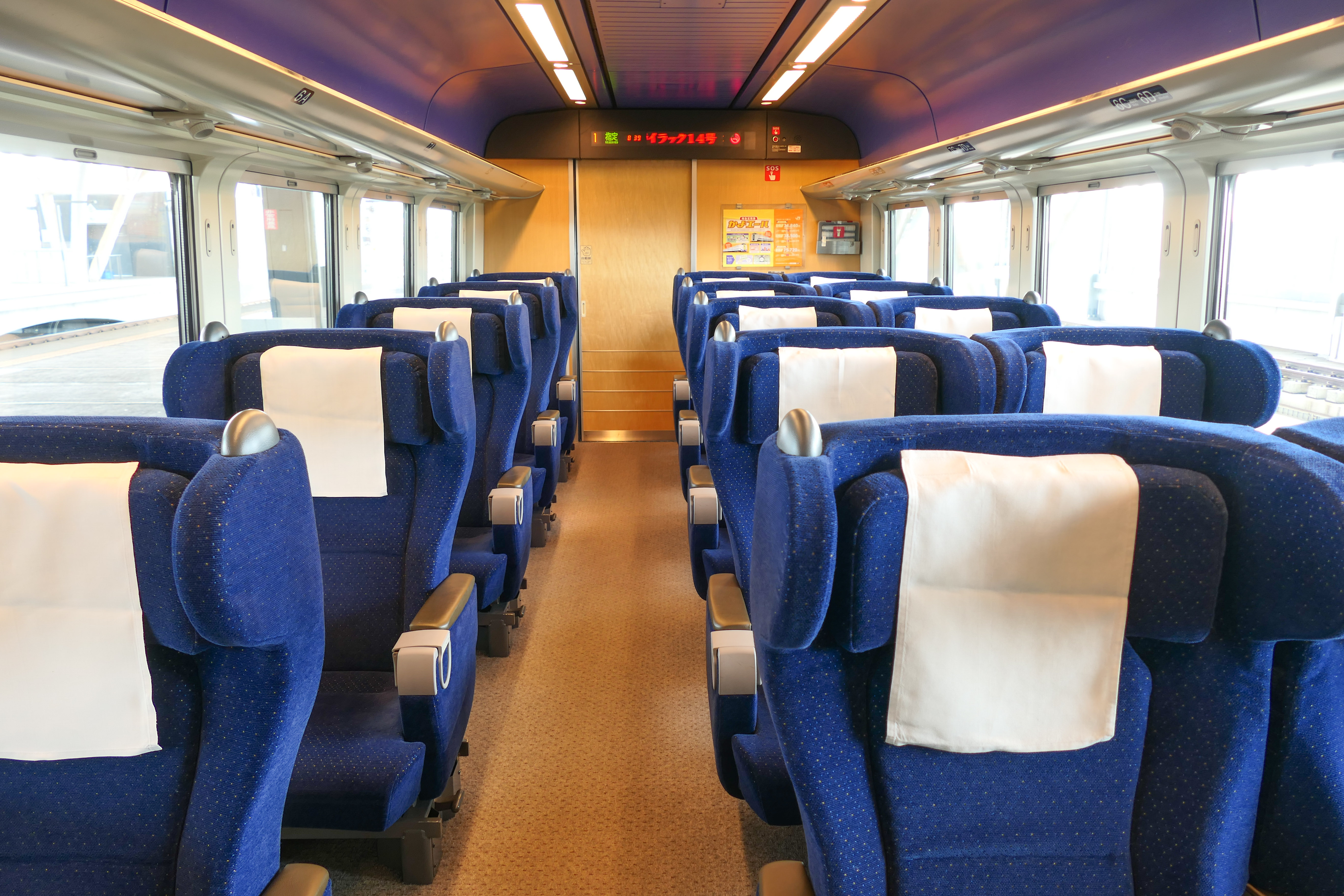
Green class saloon of KuRoHa 789-100 car, May 2021

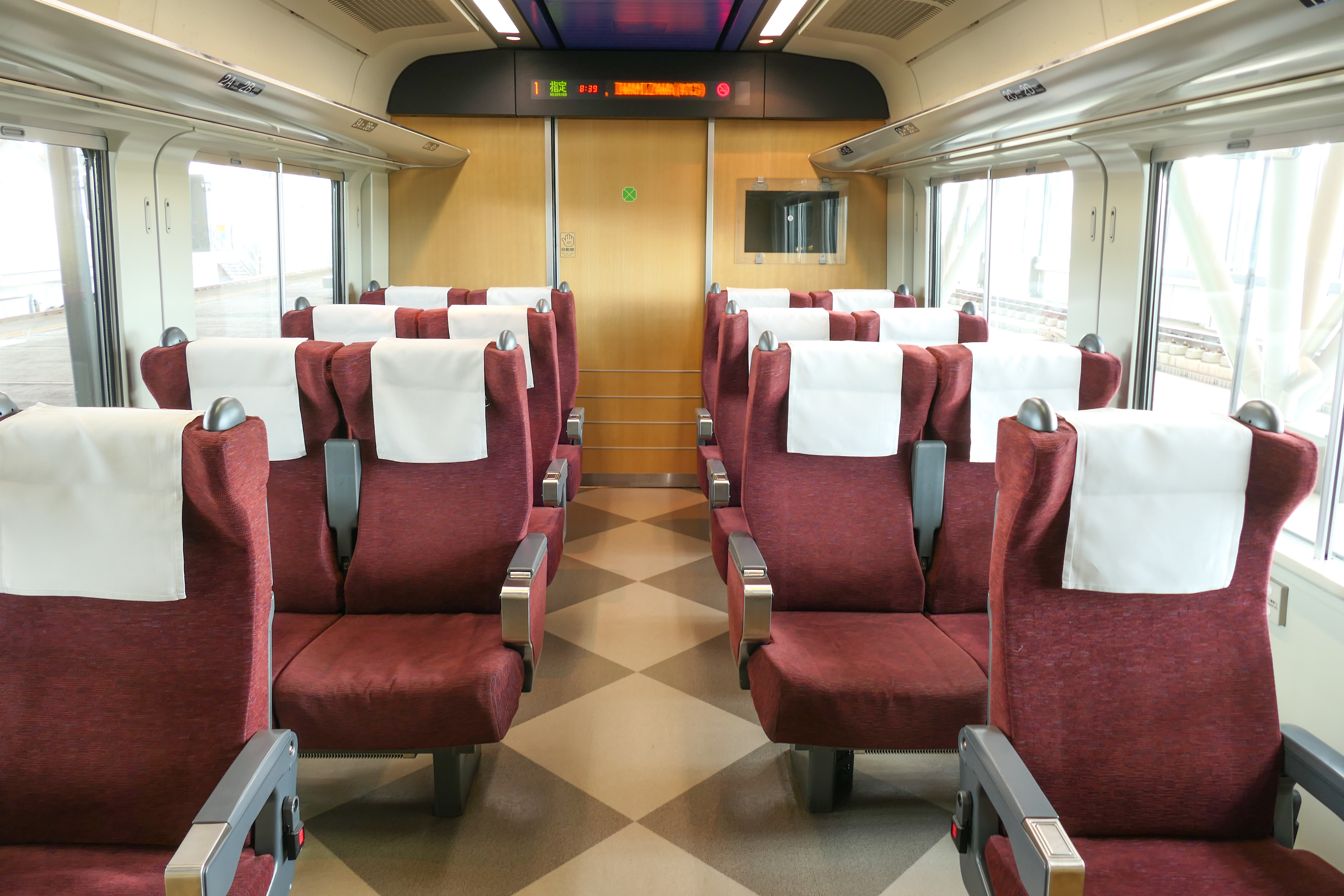
Interior of KuRoHa 789-100 car, May 2021

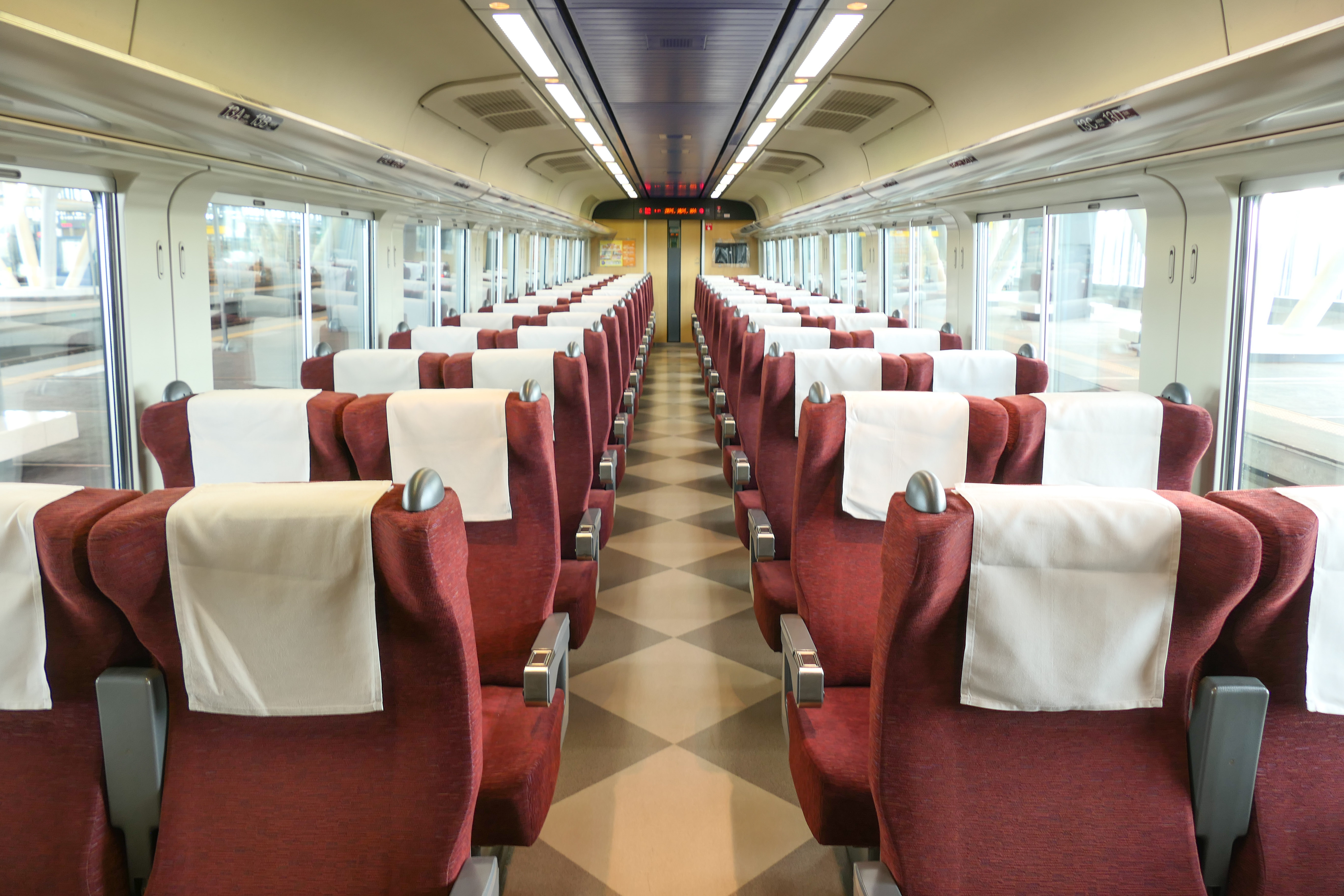
Interior of KuHa 789-200 car, May 2021

== Kamui and Suzuran 789-1000 series ==
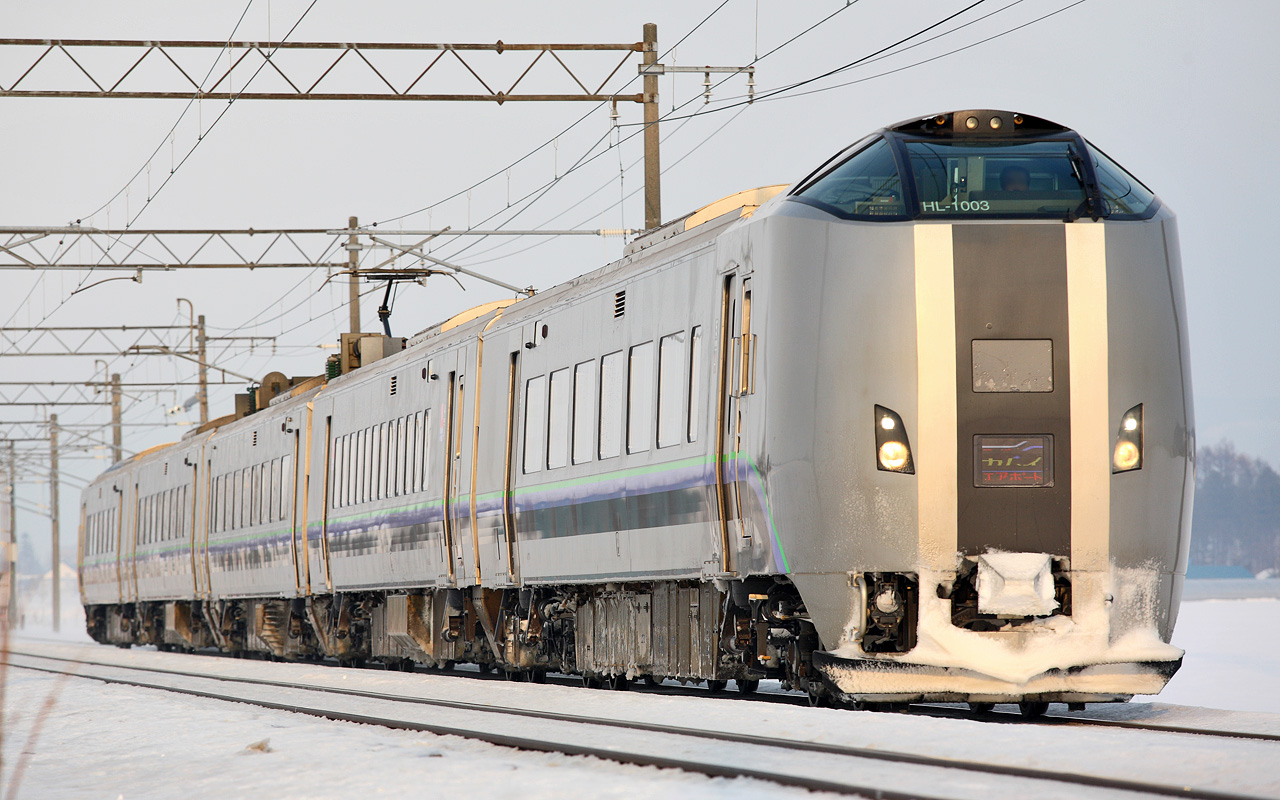
789-1000 series on a Super Kamui/Airport service in January 2009

Seven 5-car 789-1000 series sets, HL-1001–1007, were delivered to Sapporo Depot between June and September 2007, and these entered service from 1 October 2007 on new Super Kamui (currently known as Kamui) limited express services between Sapporo and Asahikawa, and on Airport rapid services between Sapporo and New Chitose Airport in conjunction with 785 series EMUs. These replaced the Lilac services formerly operated by 781 series EMUs.

The 789-1000 sets differ from the earlier Super Hakuchō and Kamui sets in not having gangway doors beneath the driving cabs.

Set HL-1005 was withdrawn in March 2011 following damage sustained in a level crossing collision on 29 January 2010.

These entered service from 1 November 2013 on new Suzuran limited express services between Sapporo and Muroran.

From the start of the revised timetable on 4 March 2017, Super Kamui services were renamed simply Kamui, and are complemented by newly introduced Lilac limited express services, which uses six-car 789-0 series EMUs.

=== Formations ===
Car No.	1	2	3	4	5
Designation	Tc1	M	T	Mu	Tc2
Numbering	KuHa 789-1000	MoHa 789-1000	SaHa 788-1000	MoHa 789-2000	KuHa 789-2000
Weight (t)	39.0	40.5	41.0	42.0	39.0
Capacity	52	64	68	49	50

Car 3 is fitted with one N-PS785 single-arm pantograph.

=== Interior ===
The 789-1000 series trainsets do not include Green class (first class) accommodation, but car 4 is designated as a "u-Seat" car with improved seating for reserved seat passengers. All other cars are normally designated as non-reserved seating.

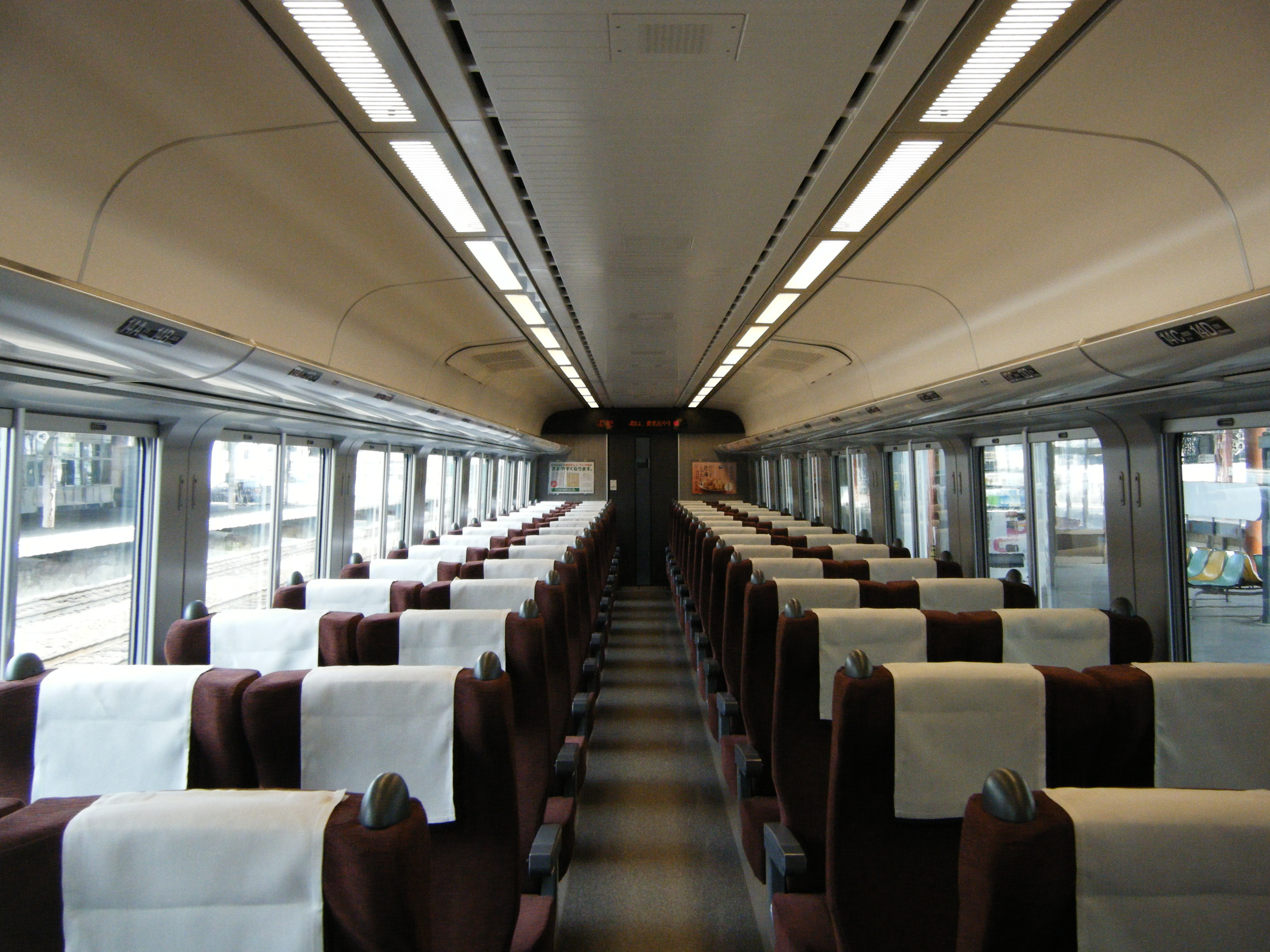
Interior view, May 2008

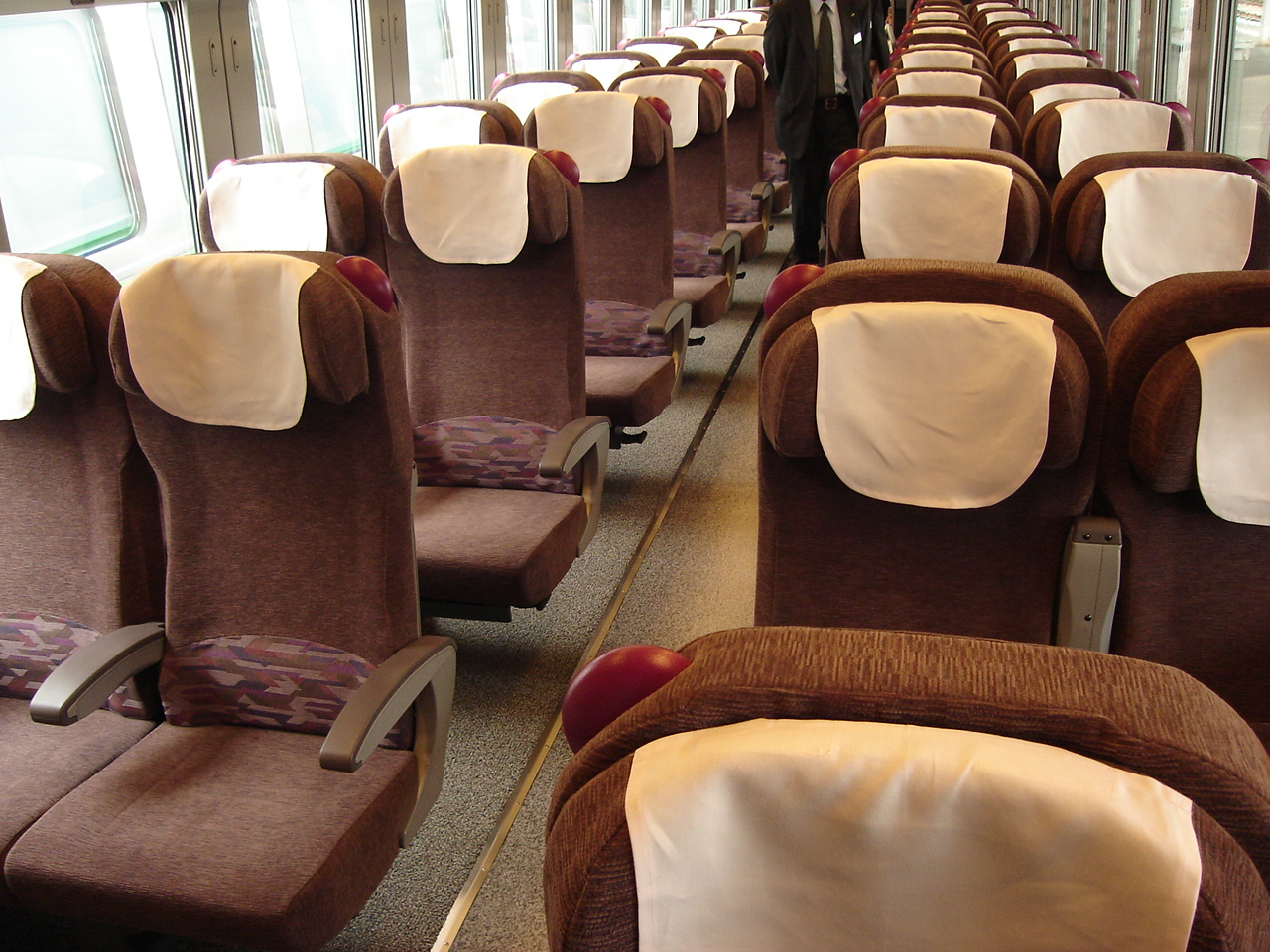
Interior view of "u-Seat" car, September 2007
