= Lilac (train) =

Japanese limited express train service

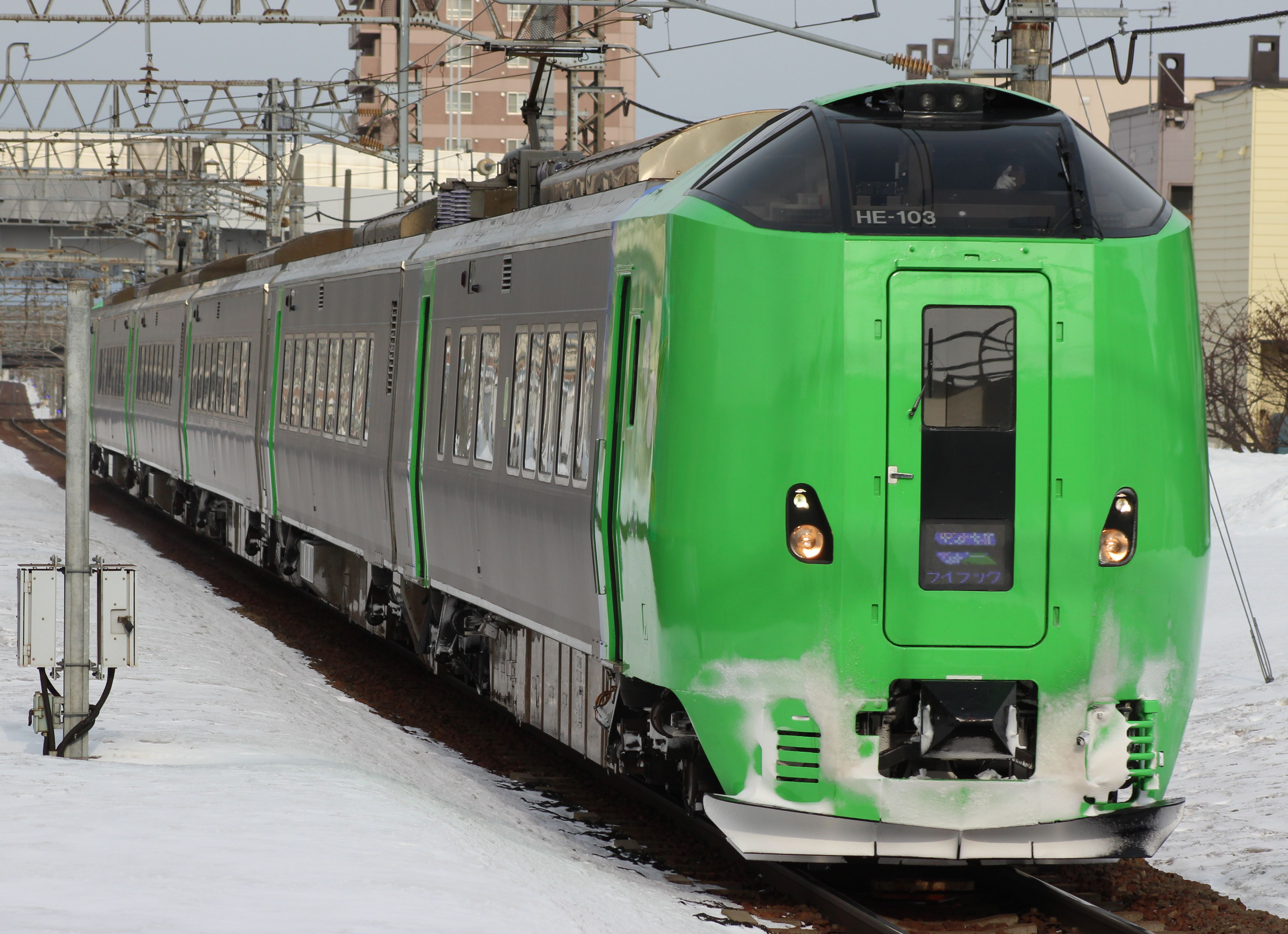
- A 789 series EMU on a Lilac service in March 2017

Overview
- Service type: Limited express
- Status: Operational
- Locale: Japan
- First service: 1 June 1963 (Express); 1 October 1980 (Limited express); 4 March 2017 (Limited express)
- Current operator: JR Hokkaido
- Former operator: JNR

Route
- Termini: Sapporo; Asahikawa
- Line used: Hakodate Main Line

On-board services
- Class: Green + Ordinary

Technical
- Rolling stock: 789 series EMUs
- Track gauge: 1,067 mm (3 ft 6 in)
- Electrification: 20 kV AC overhead

The Lilac (ライラック, Rairakku) is a limited express train service operated by Hokkaido Railway Company (JR Hokkaido) between Sapporo and Asahikawa in Hokkaido via the Hakodate Main Line since 4 March 2017. The Lilac train service name was also formerly used for express and limited express services operated by Japanese National Railways (JNR) and later by JR Hokkaido between 1963 and 2007.

== Stations ==
Services stop at the following stations.

- Sapporo
- Iwamizawa
- Bibai
- Sunagawa
- Takikawa
- Fukagawa
- Asahikawa

== Rolling stock ==
Services are normally formed of six-car 789 series electric multiple unit (EMU) trains. All cars are no-smoking.

Up until 2007, Lilac services were normally formed of 4-car 781 series EMUs based at Sapporo. All cars were non-reserved except for car 4.

== History ==
=== 1963–1968 ===
The Lilac was first introduced on 1 June 1963 as an express service operating between Hakodate and Sapporo via Otaru. This service was discontinued from 1 October 1968 when it was merged with the Niseko express.

=== 1980–2007 ===
The Lilac name was revived from 1 October 1980 as a limited express service operating between Muroran and Asahikawa via Sapporo, replacing previous Ishikari (Sapporo – Asahikawa) limited express and Chitose (Chitose and Muroran Main Line) express services.

From 1 July 1992, with the opening of New Chitose Airport, Lilac services were changed to operate between New Chitose Airport and Asahikawa via Sapporo, where trains reversed. Between Sapporo and New Chitose Airport, trains operated as the Airport rapid service. At the same time, the services to Muroran were split off to become the Suzuran limited express. The Lilac services supplemented the Super White Arrow services between Sapporo and Asahikawa, which stopped at fewer stations. The Lilac services operated hourly, departing from Sapporo and Asahikawa at 30 minutes past the hour, taking 1 hour 30 minutes.

Trains were repainted from the original JNR livery into a new livery based on that of the Super Tokachi between February 1992 and March 1993.

Improved "u-Seat" reserved seating accommodation (rows 1 to 7) was added to half of car 4 between March and June 2001.

Lilac services were discontinued from the start of the 1 October 2007 timetable revision, when they were merged and replaced together with the former Super White Arrow services to become Super Kamui services, and the 781 series EMUs were retired.

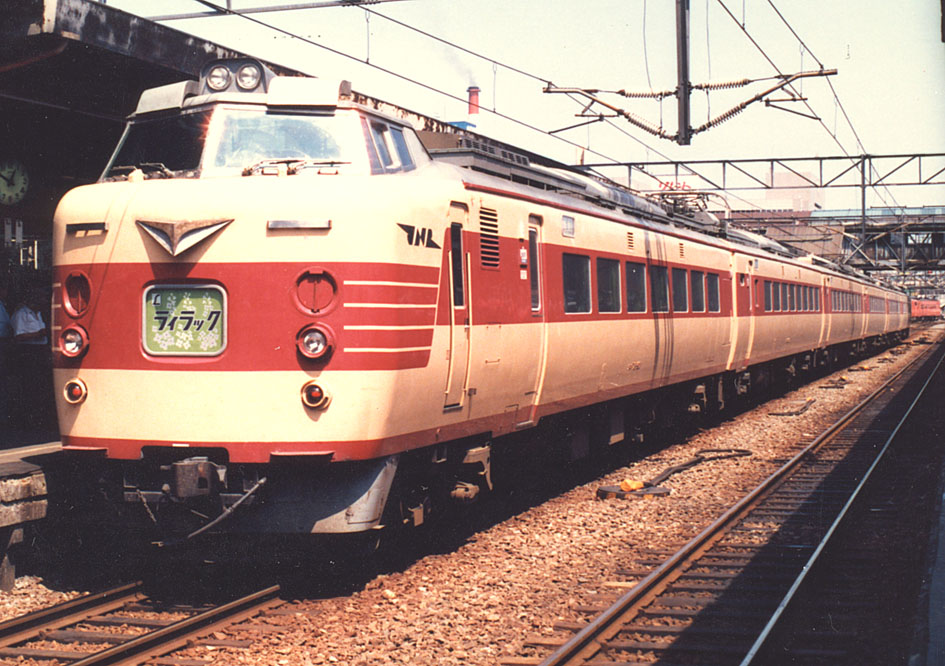
781 series EMU in original JNR livery, 1986

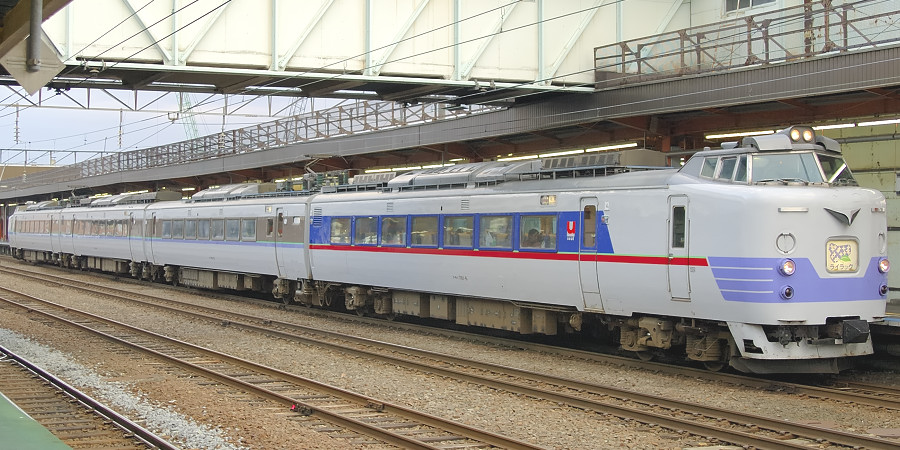
781 series on a Lilac service at Asahikawa Station, showing the modified livery applied to the "u-Seat" car, November 2006

=== 2017– ===
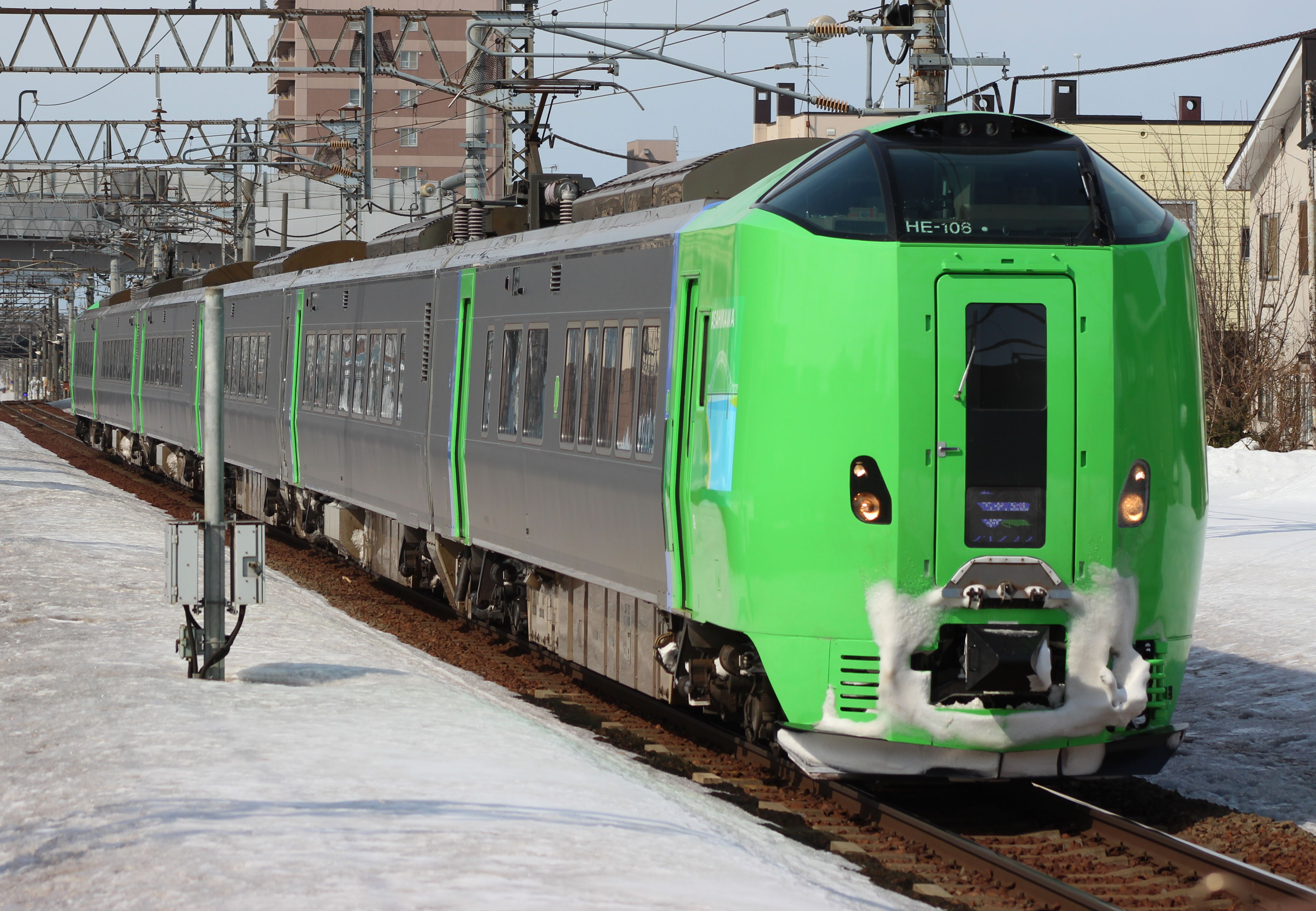
789 series EMU set HE-106 on a Lilac service in March 2017

From the start of the revised timetable on 4 March 2017, Lilac limited express services were reintroduced between Sapporo and Asahikawa using six-car 789-0 series EMUs previously used on Super Hakucho services until March 2016. These services complement the Kamui services using five-car 789-1000 series EMUs.

==== Future plans ====
On 19 November 2025, JR Hokkaido announced that all non-reserved seating on Lilac services would be eliminated effective the next timetable revision, making all trains operate solely with reserved seating.
